= 2019–20 Nebraska Cornhuskers women's basketball team =

Intercollegiate basketball season

2019–20 Nebraska Cornhuskers women's basketball
- Conference: Big Ten Conference
- Record: 17–13 (7–11 Big Ten)
- Head coach: Amy Williams (4th season)
- Assistant coaches: Tom Goehle; Chuck Love; Tandem Mays
- Home arena: Pinnacle Bank Arena

2019–20 Big Ten women's basketball standings
	Conf.				Overall
Team	W		L	PCT	W		L	PCT
No. 4 Maryland†	16	–	2	.889	28	–	4	.875
No. 12 Northwestern	16	–	2	.889	26	–	4	.867
No. 21 Iowa	14	–	4	.778	23	–	7	.767
No. 20 Indiana	13	–	5	.722	24	–	8	.750
Rutgers	11	–	7	.611	22	–	9	.710
Ohio State	11	–	7	.611	21	–	12	.636
Michigan	10	–	8	.556	21	–	11	.656
Michigan State	9	–	9	.500	16	–	14	.533
Purdue	8	–	10	.444	18	–	14	.563
Nebraska	7	–	11	.389	17	–	13	.567
Minnesota	5	–	13	.278	16	–	15	.516
Wisconsin	3	–	15	.167	12	–	19	.387
Illinois	2	–	16	.111	11	–	19	.367
Penn State	1	–	17	.056	7	–	23	.233
† 2020 Big Ten tournament winner Rankings from AP poll

The 2019–20 Nebraska Cornhuskers women's basketball team represented the University of Nebraska during the 2019–20 NCAA Division I women's basketball season. The Cornhuskers, led by fourth year head coach Amy Williams, played their home games at Pinnacle Bank Arena and were members of the Big Ten Conference.

They finished the season 17–13, 7–11 in Big Ten play to finish in tenth place. They lost in the second round of the Big Ten women's tournament to Michigan. The NCAA tournament and WNIT were cancelled due to the COVID-19 outbreak.

== Previous season ==
The Cornhuskers finished the season 14–16, 11–5 in Big Ten play to finish in a 4 way for sixth place. They lost in the second round of the Big Ten women's tournament to Purdue. They were not invited to any post season tournaments.

== Roster ==
2019–20 Nebraska Cornhuskers women's basketball team
Players
Coaches

Pos.	#	Name	Height	Year	Previous school	Hometown
G	1	Makenzie Helms	5 ft 8 in (1.73 m)	Fr	East Haven	East Haven, CT
G	2	Trinity Brady	5 ft 11 in (1.8 m)	Fr	Hamilton Heights Christian	Indianapolis IN
G	3	Hannah Whitish	5 ft 9 in (1.75 m)	Sr	Barneveld	Barneveld, WI
G	4	Sam Haiby	5 ft 9 in (1.75 m)	So	Moorhead	Moorhead, MN
G	5	Nicea Eliely	6 ft 1 in (1.85 m)	Sr	Rampart	Colorado Springs, CO
G	11	Kristian Hudson	5 ft 5 in (1.65 m)	Sr	Clay-Chalkville; Florida International	Birmingham, AL
F	13	Ashtyn Veerbeek	6 ft 2 in (1.88 m)	So	Western Christian	Sioux Center, IA
G/F	14	Grace Mitchell	6 ft 2 in (1.88 m)	Sr	Wellington	Wellington, KS
C	31	Kate Cain	6 ft 5 in (1.96 m)	Jr	Pine Bush	Middletown, NY
F	32	Leigha Brown	6 ft 1 in (1.85 m)	So	DeKalb	Auburn, IN
G/F	33	Taylor Kissinger	6 ft 1 in (1.85 m)	Jr	Minden	Minden, NE
F	34	Isabelle Bourne	6 ft 2 in (1.88 m)	Fr	Australian Institute of Sport	Canberra, Australia
F	44	Kayla Mershon	6 ft 3 in (1.91 m)	So	Minnetonka	Chanhasen, MN

Head coach

- Amy Williams (Nebraska)

Assistant coach(es)

- Tom Goehle (Augustana (SD))
- Chuck Love (Northwestern Oklahoma State)
- Tandem Mays (Tulsa)

Legend

- (C) Team captain
- (S) Suspended
- (I) Ineligible
- (W) Walk-on
- Injured
- Current redshirt

Roster
Last update: May 8, 2020

== Schedule ==
Date time, TV	Rank^{#}	Opponent^{#}	Result	Record	Site (attendance) city, state
Exhibition
November 2, 2019*; 4:00 p.m., HSN		Rogers State	W 97–33	–	Pinnacle Bank Arena (3,289); Lincoln, NE
Non-conference regular season
November 6, 2019*; 12:00 p.m., BTN+		Alabama A&M	W 68–46	1–0	Pinnacle Bank Arena (5,250); Lincoln, NE
November 10, 2019*; 2:00 p.m., SECN+		at Missouri	W 90–85 ^{OT}	2–0	Mizzou Arena (4,114); Columbia, MO
November 14, 2019*; 7:00 p.m., BTN+		Morgan State	W 78–55	3–0	Pinnacle Bank Arena (3,377); Lincoln, NE
November 17, 2019*; 2:00 p.m., BTN+		SIUE	W 63–49	4–0	Pinnacle Bank Arena (3,537); Lincoln, NE
November 20, 2019*; 7:00 p.m., BTN+		Southern	W 73–39	5–0	Pinnacle Bank Arena (3,541); Lincoln, NE
November 24, 2019*; 2:00 p.m., BTN+		Creighton	L 74–79	5–1	Pinnacle Bank Arena (3,967); Lincoln, NE
November 29, 2019*; 7:45 p.m., HSN		vs. USC; South Point Shootout	W 67–54	6–1	South Point Arena (300); Enterprise, NV
November 30, 2019*; 5:30 p.m., HSN		vs. Sacred Heart; South Point Shootout	W 72–49	7–1	South Point Arena; Enterprise, NV
December 4, 2019*; 6:00 p.m., BTN		Duke; ACC–Big Ten Women's Challenge	W 83–79	8–1	Pinnacle Bank Arena (4,013); Lincoln, NE
December 14, 2019*; 1:00 p.m., BTN+		Oral Roberts	W 77–67	9–1	Pinnacle Bank Arena (3,769); Lincoln, NE
December 22, 2019*; 12:00 p.m., BTN+		Manhattan	W 71–51	10–1	Pinnacle Bank Arena (4,025); Lincoln, NE
Big Ten conference season
December 28, 2019; 1:00 p.m., BTN+		Iowa	W 78–69	11–1 (1–0)	Pinnacle Bank Arena (5,228); Lincoln, NE
December 31, 2019; 12:00 p.m., BTN		at Michigan State	L 70–78 ^{OT}	11–2 (1–1)	Breslin Center (5,121); East Lansing, MI
January 4, 2020; 5:00 p.m., BTN		Minnesota	W 72–58	12–2 (2–1)	Pinnacle Bank Arena (5,940); Lincoln, NE
January 9, 2020; 7:00 p.m.		Wisconsin	W 65–50	13–2 (3–1)	Pinnacle Bank Arena (3,954); Lincoln, NE
January 9, 2020; 1:00 p.m., BTN+		at Rutgers	L 65–69	13–3 (3–2)	Louis Brown Athletic Center (2,023); Piscataway, NJ
January 16, 2020; 1:00 p.m., BTN		at No. 20 Maryland	L 69–87	13–4 (3–3)	Xfinity Center (3,839); College Park, MD
January 19, 2020; 4:00 p.m., BTN		Michigan	W 74–71	14–4 (4–3)	Pinnacle Bank Arena (5,030); Lincoln, NE
January 22, 2020; 7:00 p.m., BTN+		Purdue	L 68–76	14–5 (4–4)	Pinnacle Bank Arena (3,819); Lincoln, NE
January 25, 2020; 11:00 a.m., BTN		at Wisconsin	W 72–71	15–5 (5–4)	Kohl Center (3,191); Madison, WI
January 30, 2020; 7:00 p.m., BTN+		at Minnesota	L 61–67	15–6 (5–5)	Williams Arena (3,568); Minneapolis, MN
February 2, 2020; 2:00 p.m., BTN		Ohio State	L 74–80 ^{OT}	15–7 (5–6)	Pinnacle Bank Arena (4,189); Lincoln, NE
February 6, 2020; 6:30 p.m., BTN+		at No. 20 Iowa	L 60–76	15–8 (5–7)	Carver–Hawkeye Arena (6,967); Iowa City, IA
February 9, 2020; 2:00 p.m., BTN+		No. 18 Indiana	L 53–57	15–9 (5–8)	Pinnacle Bank Arena (6,160); Lincoln, NE
February 13, 2020; 7:00 p.m.		Penn State	W 75–58	16–9 (6–8)	Pinnacle Bank Arena (3,907); Lincoln, NE
February 16, 2020; 2:00 p.m., BTN+		at No. 19 Northwestern	L 56–60	16–10 (6–9)	Welsh–Ryan Arena (2,172); Evanston, IL
February 19, 2020; 6:00 p.m., BTN+		at Ohio State	L 52–65	16–11 (6–10)	Value City Arena (3,896); Columbus, OH
February 22, 2020; 2:00 p.m., BTN+		Illinois	W 80–58	17–11 (7–10)	Pinnacle Bank Arena (5,044); Lincoln, NE
February 27, 2020; 5:00 p.m., BTN		at No. 22 Indiana	L 53–81	17–12 (7–11)	Simon Skjodt Assembly Hall (3,583); Bloomington, IN
Big Ten Women's Tournament
March 5, 2020; 5:30 p.m., BTN	(10)	vs. (7) Michigan; Second Round	L 75–81	17–13	Bankers Life Fieldhouse (4,349); Indianapolis, IN
*Non-conference game. ^{#}Rankings from AP Poll. (#) Tournament seedings in parentheses. All times are in CST Time.

== Rankings ==
Regular season polls
Poll	Pre- Season	Week 2	Week 3	Week 4	Week 5	Week 6	Week 7	Week 8	Week 9	Week 10	Week 11	Week 12	Week 13	Week 14	Week 15	Week 16	Week 17	Week 18	Week 19	Final
AP								RV	RV	RV										N/A
Coaches																				

Legend
	Increase in ranking
	Decrease in ranking
	Not ranked previous week
(RV)	Received Votes

== See also ==
2019–20 Nebraska Cornhuskers men's basketball team
