= 2019–20 Penn State Lady Lions basketball team =

Intercollegiate basketball season

2019–20 Penn State Lady Lions basketball
- Conference: Big Ten Conference
- Record: 7–23 (1–17 Big Ten)
- Head coach: Carolyn Kieger (1st season)
- Assistant coaches: Ginny Boggess; Ashley Earley; Myia Johnson
- Home arena: Bryce Jordan Center

2019–20 Big Ten women's basketball standings
	Conf.				Overall
Team	W		L	PCT	W		L	PCT
No. 4 Maryland†	16	–	2	.889	28	–	4	.875
No. 12 Northwestern	16	–	2	.889	26	–	4	.867
No. 21 Iowa	14	–	4	.778	23	–	7	.767
No. 20 Indiana	13	–	5	.722	24	–	8	.750
Rutgers	11	–	7	.611	22	–	9	.710
Ohio State	11	–	7	.611	21	–	12	.636
Michigan	10	–	8	.556	21	–	11	.656
Michigan State	9	–	9	.500	16	–	14	.533
Purdue	8	–	10	.444	18	–	14	.563
Nebraska	7	–	11	.389	17	–	13	.567
Minnesota	5	–	13	.278	16	–	15	.516
Wisconsin	3	–	15	.167	12	–	19	.387
Illinois	2	–	16	.111	11	–	19	.367
Penn State	1	–	17	.056	7	–	23	.233
† 2020 Big Ten tournament winner Rankings from AP poll

The 2019–20 Penn State Lady Lions basketball team represented Pennsylvania State University during the 2019–20 NCAA Division I women's basketball season. The Lady Lions, led by first-year head coach Carolyn Kieger, played their home games at the Bryce Jordan Center in Penn State University Park, as members of the Big Ten Conference.

They finished the season with a record of 7–23, 1–17 in Big Ten play, and finished in fourteenth place. They lost in the first round of the Big Ten women's tournament to Minnesota.

== Previous season ==
The Lady Lions finished the season with a record of 12–18, 5–13 in Big Ten play, and finished in twelfth place. They lost in the first round of the Big Ten women's tournament to Wisconsin.

After the season, Coquese Washington was fired as head coach. She finished at Penn State with a twelve-year record of 209–169.

== Roster ==
2019–20 Penn State Nittany Lions women's basketball team
Players
Coaches

Pos.	#	Name	Height	Year	Previous school	Hometown
F	1	Alisia Smith	6 ft 3 in (1.91 m)	Jr	Waverly	Lansing, MI
G	2	Jayla James	6 ft 1 in (1.85 m)	Fr	Riverdale Baptist	Upper Marlboro, MD
G	3	Nia Staples	5 ft 8 in (1.73 m)	GS	Lakota West; West Virginia	Cincinnati, OH
G	4	Siyeh Frazier	5 ft 9 in (1.75 m)	Sr	Renaissance	Detroit, MI
G	5	Kemaria McDaniel	5 ft 10 in (1.78 m)	Jr	Dearborn Heights Robichaud	Inkster, MI
G	10	Mya Bembry	6 ft 1 in (1.85 m)	Fr	West Orange	West Orange, NJ
F	11	Anna Camden	6 ft 3 in (1.91 m)	Fr	Shipley	Downingtown, PA
G	12	Makenna Marisa	5 ft 11 in (1.8 m)	Fr	Peters Township	McMurray, PA
G	23	Shay Hagans	5 ft 6 in (1.68 m)	Fr	Osbourn Park	Manassas, VA
G	25	Kelly Jekot	6 ft 0 in (1.83 m)	GS	Cumberland Valley; Villanova	Enola, PA
G	31	Jaida Travascio-Green	6 ft 2 in (1.88 m)	Sr	Downers Grove North	Lisle, IL
F	33	Lauren Ebo	6 ft 4 in (1.93 m)	So	Riverdale Baptist	Washington, D.C.
F	43	Bexley Wallace	6 ft 3 in (1.91 m)	So	Pickerington Central	Pickerington, OH

Head coach

- Carolyn Kieger (Marquette)

Assistant coach(es)

- Ginny Boggess (Wingate)
- Ashley Earley (Vanderbilt)
- Myia Johnson (Rutgers)

Legend

- (C) Team captain
- (S) Suspended
- (I) Ineligible
- (W) Walk-on
- Injured
- Current redshirt

Roster
Last update: October 22, 2024

== Schedule and results ==
Date time, TV	Rank^{#}	Opponent^{#}	Result	Record	Site (attendance) city, state
Exhibition
November 1, 2019*; 6:00 p.m.		Kutztown	W 64–44	–	Bryce Jordan Center; University Park, PA
Non-conference regular season
November 5, 2019*; 4:00 p.m., PSSN		at Towson	W 73–67	1–0	SECU Arena (711); Towson, MD
November 10, 2019*; 2:00 p.m., PSSN		Rider	L 70–78	1–1	Bryce Jordan Center (1,999); University Park, PA
November 13, 2019*; 7:00 p.m., PSSN		Fordham	W 72–59	2–1	Bryce Jordan Center (1,639); University Park, PA
November 17, 2019*; 2:00 p.m., PSSN		La Salle	L 67–69	2–2	Bryce Jordan Center (1,949); University Park, PA
November 21, 2019*; 7:00 p.m., PSSN		Clemson	W 68–55	3–2	Bryce Jordan Center (1,740); University Park, PA
November 24, 2019*; 2:00 p.m., PSSN		George Mason	L 68–78	3–3	Bryce Jordan Center (1,911); University Park, PA
November 29, 2019*; 6:15 p.m., PSSN		vs. Long Beach State; Cal Classic	L 56–64	3–4	Haas Pavilion (1,003); Berkeley, CA
November 30, 2019*; 4:00 p.m., PSSN		vs. North Carolina Central; Cal Classic	W 92–68	4–4	Haas Pavilion (103); Berkeley, CA
December 5, 2019*; 7:00 p.m., PSSN		Pittsburgh; ACC–Big Ten Women's Challenge	W 78–73	5–4	Bryce Jordan Center (1,667); University Park, PA
December 14, 2019*; 3:00 p.m., NBC Sports Philadelphia		at Princeton	L 55–72	5–5	Jadwin Gymnasium (869); Princeton, NJ
December 22, 2019*; 12:00 p.m., PSSN		Sacred Heart	W 88–65	6–5	Bryce Jordan Center (1,774); University Park, PA
Big Ten conference season
December 28, 2019; 4:00 p.m., PSSN		Minnesota	L 74–81	6–6 (0–1)	Bryce Jordan Center (1,923); University Park, PA
December 31, 2019; 2:00 p.m., PSSN		at Michigan	L 48–82	6–7 (0–2)	Crisler Center (5,012); Ann Arbor, MI
January 4, 2020; 4:00 p.m., BTN		at Wisconsin	L 65–71	6–8 (0–3)	Kohl Center (5,078); Madison, WI
January 9, 2020; 7:00 p.m., BTN+		Michigan State	W 86–73	7–8 (1–3)	Bryce Jordan Center (1,696); University Park, PA
January 12, 2020; 2:00 p.m., PSSN		at Ohio State	L 70–80	7–9 (1–4)	Value City Arena (5,428); Columbus, OH
January 16, 2020; 7:00 p.m., PSSN		Rutgers	L 57–62	7–10 (1–5)	Bryce Jordan Center (1,685); University Park, PA
January 19, 2020; 3:00 p.m., PSSN		at Northwestern	L 59–85	7–11 (1–6)	Welsh–Ryan Arena (1,424); Evanston, IL
January 23, 2020; 6:00 p.m., BTN		No. 17 Indiana	L 60–76	7–12 (1–7)	Bryce Jordan Center (1,634); University Park, PA
January 26, 2020; 2:00 p.m., BTN		at Purdue	L 68–81	7–13 (1–8)	Mackey Arena (6,057); West Lafayette, IN
January 30, 2020; 7:00 p.m., PSSN		No. 18 Iowa	L 66–77	7–14 (1–9)	Bryce Jordan Center (1,657); University Park, PA
February 2, 2020; 12:00 p.m., PSSN		No. 23 Northwestern	L 59–82	7–15 (1–10)	Bryce Jordan Center (2,362); University Park, PA
February 6, 2020; 7:00 p.m., PSSN		at Rutgers	L 39–72	7–16 (1–11)	Louis Brown Athletic Center (1,658); Piscataway, NJ
February 9, 2020; 2:00 p.m., BTN+		Illinois	L 66–70	7–17 (1–12)	Bryce Jordan Center (4,592); University Park, PA
February 13, 2020; 8:00 p.m., PSSN		at Nebraska	L 58–75	7–18 (1–13)	Pinnacle Bank Arena (3,907); Lincoln, NE
February 16, 2020; 2:00 p.m., BTN+		No. 10 Maryland	L 69–106	7–19 (1–14)	Bryce Jordan Center (2,835); University Park, PA
February 22, 2020; 3:00 p.m., BTN+		at No. 19 Iowa	L 57–100	7–20 (1–15)	Carver–Hawkeye Arena (8,389); Iowa City, IA
February 27, 2020; 7:00 p.m., PSSN		Michigan	L 66–80	7–21 (1–16)	Bryce Jordan Center (1,691); University Park, PA
March 1, 2020; 2:00 p.m., PSSN		at Michigan State	L 80–99	7–22 (1–17)	Breslin Center (10,584); East Lansing, MI
Big Ten women's tournament
March 4, 2020; 4:20 p.m., BTN	(14)	vs. (11) Minnesota; First round	L 65–85	7–13	Bankers Life Fieldhouse (3,793); Indianapolis, IN
*Non-conference game. ^{#}Rankings from AP poll. (#) Tournament seedings in parentheses. All times are in Eastern.

== Rankings ==
Regular-season polls
Poll	Pre- season	Week 2	Week 3	Week 4	Week 5	Week 6	Week 7	Week 8	Week 9	Week 10	Week 11	Week 12	Week 13	Week 14	Week 15	Week 16	Week 17	Week 18	Week 19	Final
AP																				
Coaches																				

Legend
	Increase in ranking
	Decrease in ranking
	Not ranked previous week
(RV)	Received votes

== See also ==
- 2019–20 Penn State Nittany Lions basketball team
