= 2019–20 Michigan State Spartans women's basketball team =

Intercollegiate basketball season

2019–20 Michigan State Spartans women's basketball
- Conference: Big Ten Conference
- Record: 16–14 (9–9 Big Ten)
- Head coach: Suzy Merchant (13th season)
- Assistant coaches: Dean Lockwood; Maria Fantanarosa; Kristin Haynie
- Home arena: Breslin Center

2019–20 Big Ten women's basketball standings
	Conf.				Overall
Team	W		L	PCT	W		L	PCT
No. 4 Maryland†	16	–	2	.889	28	–	4	.875
No. 12 Northwestern	16	–	2	.889	26	–	4	.867
No. 21 Iowa	14	–	4	.778	23	–	7	.767
No. 20 Indiana	13	–	5	.722	24	–	8	.750
Rutgers	11	–	7	.611	22	–	9	.710
Ohio State	11	–	7	.611	21	–	12	.636
Michigan	10	–	8	.556	21	–	11	.656
Michigan State	9	–	9	.500	16	–	14	.533
Purdue	8	–	10	.444	18	–	14	.563
Nebraska	7	–	11	.389	17	–	13	.567
Minnesota	5	–	13	.278	16	–	15	.516
Wisconsin	3	–	15	.167	12	–	19	.387
Illinois	2	–	16	.111	11	–	19	.367
Penn State	1	–	17	.056	7	–	23	.233
† 2020 Big Ten tournament winner Rankings from AP poll

The 2019–20 Michigan State Spartans women's basketball team represented Michigan State University during the 2019–20 NCAA Division I women's basketball season. The Spartans, led by 13th-year head coach Suzy Merchant, played their home games at the Breslin Center in East Lansing, Michigan as members of the Big Ten Conference.

== Roster ==
2019–20 Michigan State Spartans women's basketball team
Players
Coaches

Pos.	#	Name	Height	Year	Previous school	Hometown
G	0	Shay Colley	5 ft 8 in (1.73 m)	RS Sr	St. Edmund Campion Secondary; South Carolina	Brampton, ON
G/F	1	Tory Ozment	6 ft 1 in (1.85 m)	So	Buford	Buford, GA
F	2	Mardrekia Cook	6 ft 0 in (1.83 m)	RS Jr	Muskegon	Muskegon, MI
G	3	Alyza Winston	5 ft 7 in (1.7 m)	Fr	Muskegon	Muskegon, MI
G	4	Taryn McCutcheon	5 ft 5 in (1.65 m)	Sr	East Lansing	East Lansing, MI
G	5	Claire Hendrickson	5 ft 11 in (1.8 m)	RS So	Wyoming	Wyoming, MI
F	12	Nia Hollie	6 ft 0 in (1.83 m)	Sr	Hopkins	Minnetonka, MN
F	14	Taiyier Parks	6 ft 3 in (1.91 m)	Fr	North Royalton	Cleveland, OH
F	15	Victoria Gaines	6 ft 1 in (1.85 m)	RS Sr	Merrillville	Merrillville, IN
G	21	Laurel Jacqmain	5 ft 8 in (1.73 m)	RS Jr	Nouvel Catholic	Saginaw, MI
G	22	Moira Joiner	5 ft 10 in (1.78 m)	Fr	Heritage	Saginaw, MI
G	24	Nia Clouden	5 ft 8 in (1.73 m)	So	St. Frances	Owings Mills, MD
G	40	Julia Ayrault	6 ft 2 in (1.88 m)	Fr	Grosse Pointe North	Grosse Pointe Woods, MI
F	42	Kayla Belles	6 ft 3 in (1.91 m)	So	Ithaca	Ithaca, MI
C	50	Cyndi Dodd	6 ft 5 in (1.96 m)	Fr	Warren Central	Indianapolis, IN

Head coach

- Suzy Merchant (Central Michigan)

Assistant coach(es)

- Dean Lockwood (Spring Arbor)
- Maria Fantanarosa (Miami (OH))
- Kristin Haynie (Michigan State)

Legend

- (C) Team captain
- (S) Suspended
- (I) Ineligible
- (W) Walk-on
- Injured
- Current redshirt

Roster
Last update: November 4, 2019

== Schedule and results ==
Date time, TV	Rank^{#}	Opponent^{#}	Result	Record	Site (attendance) city, state
Exhibition
10/30/2019*; 7:00 pm, BTN Plus	No. 17	Ferris State	W 85–45		Breslin Center (3,286); East Lansing, MI
Non-conference regular season
11/05/2019*; 7:00 pm, BTN Plus	No. 17	Eastern Michigan	W 85–50	1–0	Breslin Center (3,956); East Lansing, MI
11/08/2019*; 7:00 pm, BTN Plus	No. 17	Detroit Mercy	W 110–52	2–0	Breslin Center (4,657); East Lansing, MI
11/14/2019*; 8:00 pm, ACCN	No. 16	at No. 15 Notre Dame	W 72–69	3–0	Joyce Center (7,556); South Bend, IN
11/19/2019*; 7:00 pm, BTN Plus	No. 15	Oakland	W 76–56	4–0	Breslin Center (3,844); East Lansing, MI
11/24/2019*; 2:00 pm, BTN Plus	No. 15	Hartford	W 79–34	5–0	Breslin Center (5,033); East Lansing, MI
11/29/2019*; 5:15 pm	No. 15	vs. LSU; Junkanoo Jam	L 56–58	5–1	Gateway Christian Academy; Bimini, Bahamas
11/30/2019*; 4:30 pm	No. 15	vs. Kansas State; Junkanoo Jam	W 65–60	6–1	Gateway Christian Academy; Bimini, Bahamas
12/05/2019*; 8:00 pm, ACCN	No. 19	at No. 8 Florida State; ACC–Big Ten Challenge	L 68–78	6–2	Donald L. Tucker Civic Center (3,258); Tallahassee, FL
12/15/2019*; 1:00 pm, BTN Plus	No. 19	Morehead State	W 93–48	7–2	Breslin Center (3,474); East Lansing, MI
12/20/2019*; 1:30 pm	No. 19	vs. Syracuse; Florida Sunshine Classic	L 63–77	7–3	Alfond Sports Center (214); Orlando, FL
12/21/2019*; 1:30 pm	No. 19	vs. No. 22 West Virginia; Florida Sunshine Classic	L 57–63	7–4	Alfond Sports Center (329); Orlando, FL
Big Ten regular season
12/28/2019; 6:00 pm, BTN		at No. 14 Indiana	L 67–79	7–5 (0–1)	Simon Skjodt Assembly Hall (6,020); Bloomington, IN
12/31/2019; 1:00 pm, BTN		Nebraska	W 78–70 ^{OT}	8–5 (1–1)	Breslin Center (5,121); East Lansing, MI
01/05/2020; 12:00 pm, ESPN2		at Michigan; Rivalry	L 69–89	8–6 (1–2)	Crisler Center (11,068); Ann Arbor, MI
01/09/2020; 7:00 pm, BTN Plus		at Penn State	L 73–86	8–7 (1–3)	Bryce Jordan Center (1,696); University Park, PA
01/12/2020; 3:00 pm, BTN Plus		Wisconsin	W 69–52	9–7 (2–3)	Breslin Center (6,174); East Lansing, MI
01/16/2020; 6:00 pm, BTN		Ohio State	W 68–65	10–7 (3–3)	Breslin Center (3,700); East Lansing, MI
01/20/2020; 6:00 pm, BTN		at Rutgers	W 66–55	11–7 (4–3)	Louis Brown Athletic Center (2,084); Piscataway, NJ
01/23/2020; 6:30 pm, BTN Plus		No. 22 Northwestern	L 48–76	11–8 (4–4)	Breslin Center (3,963); East Lansing, MI
01/26/2020; 4:00 pm, BTN		at No. 19 Iowa	L 57–74	11–9 (4–5)	Carver–Hawkeye Arena (13,420); Iowa City, IA
01/30/2020; 7:00 pm, BTN Plus		Purdue	L 66–76	11–10 (4–6)	Breslin Center (4,314); East Lansing, MI
02/03/2020; 8:00 pm, BTN		at No. 13 Maryland	L 53–94	11–11 (4–7)	Xfinity Center (4,798); College Park, MD
02/10/2020; 9:00 pm, BTN		at No. 19 Northwestern	L 55–85	11–12 (4–8)	Welsh–Ryan Arena (864); Evanston, IL
02/13/2020; 7:00 pm, BTN Plus		Rutgers	W 57–53	12–12 (5–8)	Breslin Center (3,878); East Lansing, MI
02/17/2020; 7:00 pm, BTN		Minnesota	W 66–54	13–12 (6–8)	Breslin Center (4,608); East Lansing, MI
02/20/2020; 7:00 pm, BTN		at Purdue	W 65–63	14–12 (7–8)	Mackey Arena (5,908); West Lafayette, IN
02/23/2020; 5:00 pm, BTN		Michigan; Rivalry	L 58–65	14–13 (7–9)	Breslin Center (11,462); East Lansing, MI
02/26/2020; 8:00 pm, BTN Plus		at Illinois	W 72–58	15–13 (8–9)	State Farm Center (1,176); Champaign, IL
03/01/2020; 2:00 pm, BTN Plus		Penn State	W 99–80	16–13 (9–9)	Breslin Center (10,584); East Lansing, MI
Big Ten tournament
03/05/2020; 12:00 pm, BTN	(8)	vs. (9) Purdue; Second round	L 63–72	16–14	Bankers Life Fieldhouse; Indianapolis, IN
*Non-conference game. ^{#}Rankings from AP Poll. (#) Tournament seedings in parentheses. C=Chicago Region. All times are in Eastern Time; Source.

== Rankings ==
2019–20 NCAA Division I women's basketball rankings

Regular season polls
Poll	Pre- Season	Week 2	Week 3	Week 4	Week 5	Week 6	Week 7	Week 8	Week 9	Week 10	Week 11	Week 12	Week 13	Week 14	Week 15	Week 16	Week 17	Week 18	Week 19	Final
AP	17	16	15	15	19															
Coaches	21		16	15																

Legend
	Increase in ranking
	Decrease in ranking
	No change
(RV)	Received votes
(NR)	Not ranked

== See also ==
2019–20 Michigan State Spartans men's basketball team
