= 2019–20 Wisconsin Badgers women's basketball team =

Intercollegiate basketball season

2019–20 Wisconsin Badgers women's basketball
- Conference: Big Ten Conference
- Record: 12–19 (3–15 Big Ten)
- Head coach: Jonathan Tsipis (4th season)
- Assistant coaches: Craig Carter; Kayla Karius; Lindsay Wisdom-Hylton
- Home arena: Kohl Center

2019–20 Big Ten women's basketball standings
| | Conf. | | | | Overall |
| Team | W | | L | PCT | W | | L | PCT |
|---|---|---|---|---|---|---|---|---|
| No. 4 Maryland† | 16 | – | 2 | .889 | 28 | – | 4 | .875 |
| No. 12 Northwestern | 16 | – | 2 | .889 | 26 | – | 4 | .867 |
| No. 21 Iowa | 14 | – | 4 | .778 | 23 | – | 7 | .767 |
| No. 20 Indiana | 13 | – | 5 | .722 | 24 | – | 8 | .750 |
| Rutgers | 11 | – | 7 | .611 | 22 | – | 9 | .710 |
| Ohio State | 11 | – | 7 | .611 | 21 | – | 12 | .636 |
| Michigan | 10 | – | 8 | .556 | 21 | – | 11 | .656 |
| Michigan State | 9 | – | 9 | .500 | 16 | – | 14 | .533 |
| Purdue | 8 | – | 10 | .444 | 18 | – | 14 | .563 |
| Nebraska | 7 | – | 11 | .389 | 17 | – | 13 | .567 |
| Minnesota | 5 | – | 13 | .278 | 16 | – | 15 | .516 |
| Wisconsin | 3 | – | 15 | .167 | 12 | – | 19 | .387 |
| Illinois | 2 | – | 16 | .111 | 11 | – | 19 | .367 |
| Penn State | 1 | – | 17 | .056 | 7 | – | 23 | .233 |
† 2020 Big Ten tournament winner Rankings from AP poll

The 2019–20 Wisconsin Badgers women's basketball team represented the University of Wisconsin–Madison during the 2019–20 NCAA Division I women's basketball season. The Badgers were led by fourth-year head coach Jonathan Tsipis and played their home games at the Kohl Center as members of the Big Ten Conference. They finished the season 12–19, including finishing 12th in the 2019–20 Big Ten Conference season with a record of 3–15, and 1–1 in the 2020 Big Ten women's basketball tournament.

== Previous season ==
The Badgers finished the 2018–19 season 15–18, including 4–14 in Big Ten play to finish in 13th place. They lost in the third round of the Big Ten women's tournament to Michigan after beating Penn State and Ohio State.

== Roster ==
2019–20 Wisconsin Badgers women's basketball team
Players
Coaches

| Pos. | # | Name | Height | Year | Previous school | Hometown |
|---|---|---|---|---|---|---|
| G | 3 | Suzanne Gilreath | 5 ft 4 in (1.63 m) | Sr | Fridley | Brooklyn Park, MN |
| F | 5 | Julie Pospisilova | 6 ft 1 in (1.85 m) | Fr | Downers Grove North | Prague, Czech Republic |
| G | 10 | Kendra Van Leeuwen | 5 ft 10 in (1.78 m) | Sr | St. John's College (ON) | Brantford, ON |
| F | 12 | Carmen Backes | 6 ft 1 in (1.85 m) | RS Fr | Chisago Lakes | Lindstrom, MN |
| F | 13 | Sydney Mathiason | 6 ft 1 in (1.85 m) | So | Monroe | Monroe, WI |
| F | 14 | Abby Laszewski | 6 ft 3 in (1.91 m) | Sr | Avon | Hartford, CT |
| G | 15 | Kara Crowley | 5 ft 10 in (1.78 m) | Jr | Beaver Dam | Beaver Dam, WI |
| G | 20 | Diamond Bragg | 5 ft 9 in (1.75 m) | So | Camp Hill | Camp Hill, PA |
| G | 22 | Niya Beverley | 5 ft 7 in (1.7 m) | Jr | St. John's College (DC) | Laurel, MD |
| G | 30 | Sydney Hilliard | 6 ft 0 in (1.83 m) | Fr | Monroe | Monroe, WI |
| F | 33 | Courtney Fredrickson | 6 ft 2 in (1.88 m) | RS Jr | Minnetonka | Excelsior, MN |
| F | 34 | Imani Lewis | 6 ft 1 in (1.85 m) | So | Life Center Academy | Willingboro, NJ |
| G | 40 | Tara Stauffacher | 5 ft 11 in (1.8 m) | Fr | Beaver Dam | Beaver Dam, WI |
| C | 41 | Sara Stapleton | 6 ft 3 in (1.91 m) | Fr | Centennial High School | Blaine, MN |
| F | 43 | Grace Mueller | 6 ft 2 in (1.88 m) | RS Sr | Verona High School | Madison, WI |
| F | 44 | Alex Leuhring | 6 ft 2 in (1.88 m) | RS So | UW–Green Bay | Verona, WI |

Head coach

- Jonathan Tsipis (North Carolina)

Assistant coach(es)

- Kayla Karius (Green Bay)
- Craig Carter (Rutgers)
- Lindsay Wisdom-Hylton (Purdue)

Legend

- (C) Team captain
- (S) Suspended
- (I) Ineligible
- (W) Walk-on
- Injured
- Current redshirt

Roster
Last update: August 25, 2024

== Recruiting class ==
College recruiting information
| Name | Hometown | School | Height | Weight | Commit date |
|---|---|---|---|---|---|
| Sydney Hilliard; PG | Monroe, WI | Monroe High School | 5 ft 11 in (1.80 m) | N/A | |
| Sydney Hilliard; PG | Recruit ratings: ESPN: (90) | | | | |
| Julie Pospisilova; SF | Prague, Czech Republic | Downers Grove North High School | 6 ft 1 in (1.85 m) | N/A | |
| Julie Pospisilova; SF | Recruit ratings: No ratings found | | | | |
| Sara Stapleton; C | Blaine, MN | Centennial High School | 6 ft 3 in (1.91 m) | N/A | |
| Sara Stapleton; C | Recruit ratings: ESPN: (90) | | | | |
| Tara Stauffacher; SF | Columbus, WI | Beaver Dam High School | 6 ft 0 in (1.83 m) | N/A | |
| Tara Stauffacher; SF | Recruit ratings: ESPN: (90) | | | | |
Overall recruit ranking:
Note: In many cases, Scout, Rivals, 247Sports, On3, and ESPN may conflict in their listings of height and weight.; In these cases, the average was taken. ESPN grades are on a 100-point scale.; Sources:

== Schedule and results ==
| Date time, TV | Rank^{#} | Opponent^{#} | Result | Record | Site (attendance) city, state |
Exhibition
| October 30, 2019*; 7:00 p.m. | | UW–Whitewater | W 67–34 | | Kohl Center; Madison, WI |
Non-conference regular season
| November 5, 2019*; 7:00 p.m. | | North Florida | W 75–62 | 1–0 | Kohl Center (3,032); Madison, WI |
| November 10, 2019*; 2:00 p.m. | | Wofford | W 78–65 | 2–0 | Kohl Center (3,593); Madison, WI |
| November 14, 2019*; 8:00 p.m. | | at Colorado | L 57–74 | 2–1 | CU Events Center (1,759); Boulder, CO |
| November 17, 2019*; 6:00 p.m. | | Milwaukee | W 71–40 | 3–1 | Kohl Center (3,668); Madison, WI |
| November 26, 2019*; 7:00 p.m. | | Eastern Illinois | W 63–55 | 4–1 | Kohl Center (3,564); Madison, WI |
| November 29, 2019*; 6:00 p.m. | | vs. Ball State; Bahamas Hoopfest | W 67–56 | 5–1 | Kendal Isaacs Gymnasium (200); Nassau, Bahamas |
| November 30, 2019*; 6:00 p.m. | | vs. No. 25 Arkansas; Bahamas Hoopfest | L 64–68 | 5–2 | Kendal Isaacs Gymnasium (350); Nassau, Bahamas |
| December 5, 2019*; 6:00 p.m. | | at Georgia Tech; ACC–Big Ten Women's Challenge | L 41–60 | 5–3 | McCamish Pavilion (1,016); Atlanta, GA |
| December 8, 2019*; 2:00 p.m. | | at North Dakota State | W 64–63 | 6–3 | Scheels Center (955); Fargo, ND |
| December 12, 2019*; 7:00 p.m. | | Alabama State | W 85–67 | 7–3 | Kohl Center; Madison, WI |
| December 20, 2019*; 7:00 p.m. | | Prairie View A&M | W 68–42 | 8–3 | Kohl Center (3,404); Madison, WI |
Big Ten regular season
| December 28, 2019; 2:00 p.m. | | Rutgers | L 61–64 | 8–4 (0–1) | Kohl Center (4,320); Madison, WI |
| December 31, 2019; 3:00 p.m. | | at Purdue | L 61–72 | 8–5 (0–2) | Mackey Arena (6,080); West Lafayette, IN |
| January 4, 2020; 3:00 p.m., BTN | | Penn State | W 71–65 | 9–5 (1–2) | Kohl Center (5,078); Madison, WI |
| January 9, 2020; 7:00 p.m. | | at Nebraska | L 50–65 | 9–6 (1–3) | Pinnacle Bank Arena (3,954); Lincoln, NE |
| January 12, 2020; 2:00 p.m. | | at Michigan State | L 52–69 | 9–7 (1–4) | Breslin Center (6,174); East Lansing, MI |
| January 16, 2020; 7:00 p.m. | | Michigan | L 56–68 | 9–8 (1–5) | Kohl Center (3,191); Madison, WI |
| January 19, 2020; 2:00 p.m. | | No. 22 Iowa | L 78–85 | 9–9 (1–6) | Kohl Center (6,460); Madison, WI |
| January 22, 2020; 7:00 p.m. | | at Minnesota | W 72–62 | 10–9 (2–6) | Williams Arena (3,619); Minneapolis, MN |
| January 25, 2020; 11:00 a.m., BTN | | Nebraska | L 71–72 | 10–10 (2–7) | Kohl Center (3,191); Madison, WI |
| January 30, 2020; 6:00 p.m. | | at No. 20 Indiana | L 65–75 ^{OT} | 10–11 (2–8) | Simon Skjodt Assembly Hall (3,576); Bloomington, IN |
| February 2, 2020; 2:00 p.m. | | at Illinois | W 73–64 | 11–11 (3–8) | State Farm Center (2,388); Champaign, IL |
| February 6, 2020; 7:00 p.m. | | Minnesota | L 64–73 | 11–12 (3–9) | Kohl Center (3,581); Madison, WI |
| February 9, 2020; 1:00 p.m. | | at Ohio State | L 74–82 | 11–13 (3–10) | Value City Arena (6,075); Columbus, OH |
| February 13, 2020; 7:00 p.m. | | Purdue | L 59–62 | 11–14 (3–11) | Kohl Center (3,799); Madison, WI |
| February 16, 2020; 2:00 p.m. | | at No. 17 Iowa | L 71–97 | 11–15 (3–12) | Carver–Hawkeye Arena (9,506); Iowa City, IA |
| February 19, 2020; 7:00 p.m. | | No. 7 Maryland | L 56–85 | 11–16 (3–13) | Kohl Center (3,878); Madison, WI |
| February 22, 2020; 11:00 a.m. | | No. 18 Northwestern | L 66–82 | 11–17 (3–14) | Kohl Center (4,172); Madison, WI |
| February 27, 2020; 6:00 p.m. | | at Rutgers | L 43–63 | 11–18 (3–15) | Louis Brown Athletic Center (1,471); Piscataway, NJ |
Big Ten Conference women's tournament
| March 4, 2020; 1:00 p.m., BTN | (12) | vs. (13) Illinois; First round | W 71–55 | 12–18 | Bankers Life Fieldhouse; Indianapolis, IN |
| March 5, 2020; 1:30 p.m., BTN | (12) | vs. (5) Rutgers; Second round | L 55–63 | 12–19 | Bankers Life Fieldhouse (4,158); Indianapolis, IN |
*Non-conference game. ^{#}Rankings from AP poll. (#) Tournament seedings in parentheses. All times are in Central.

== See also ==
- 2019–20 Wisconsin Badgers men's basketball team
