= 2019–20 Michigan Wolverines women's basketball team =

Intercollegiate basketball season

2019–20 Michigan Wolverines women's basketball
- Conference: Big Ten Conference
- Record: 21–11 (10–8 Big Ten)
- Head coach: Kim Barnes Arico (8th season)
- Assistant coaches: Wesley Brooks; Toyelle Wilson; Yvonne Sanchez
- Home arena: Crisler Center

2019–20 Big Ten women's basketball standings
	Conf.				Overall
Team	W		L	PCT	W		L	PCT
No. 4 Maryland†	16	–	2	.889	28	–	4	.875
No. 12 Northwestern	16	–	2	.889	26	–	4	.867
No. 21 Iowa	14	–	4	.778	23	–	7	.767
No. 20 Indiana	13	–	5	.722	24	–	8	.750
Rutgers	11	–	7	.611	22	–	9	.710
Ohio State	11	–	7	.611	21	–	12	.636
Michigan	10	–	8	.556	21	–	11	.656
Michigan State	9	–	9	.500	16	–	14	.533
Purdue	8	–	10	.444	18	–	14	.563
Nebraska	7	–	11	.389	17	–	13	.567
Minnesota	5	–	13	.278	16	–	15	.516
Wisconsin	3	–	15	.167	12	–	19	.387
Illinois	2	–	16	.111	11	–	19	.367
Penn State	1	–	17	.056	7	–	23	.233
† 2020 Big Ten tournament winner Rankings from AP poll

The 2019–20 Michigan Wolverines women's basketball team represented the University of Michigan during the 2019–20 NCAA Division I women's basketball season. The Wolverines, led by head coach Kim Barnes Arico in her eighth year, played their home games at the Crisler Center. This season marked the program's 38th season as a member of the Big Ten Conference.

== Previous season ==
The Wolverines finished the 2018–19 season with a 22–12 record, including 11–7 in Big Ten play to finish in fourth place. They advanced to the semifinals of the Big Ten women's tournament for the first time since 2001, where they lost to Maryland. They received an at-large bid to the 2019 NCAA Division I women's basketball tournament, where they defeated Kansas State in the first round before losing to Louisville in the second round.

== Off-season ==
On May 20, 2019, Toyelle Wilson was named an assistant coach and recruiting coordinator for Michigan's women's basketball team.

== Roster ==
2019–20 Michigan Wolverines women's basketball team
Players
Coaches

Pos.	#	Name	Height	Year	Previous school	Hometown
F	00	Naz Hillmon	6 ft 2 in (1.88 m)	So	Gilmour Academy	Cleveland, OH
G	1	Amy Dilk	6 ft 0 in (1.83 m)	So	Carmel	Carmel, IN
G	2	Priscilla Smeenge	6 ft 0 in (1.83 m)	Jr	Celebration	Jacksonville, FL
G	3	Maddie Nolan	5 ft 9 in (1.75 m)	Fr	Zionsville	Zionsville, IN
F	5	Kayla Robbins	6 ft 1 in (1.85 m)	Sr	St. John's College	Mitchellville, MD
G	12	Ariel Young	6 ft 1 in (1.85 m)	So	Lincoln	Tallahassee, FL
G	14	Akienreh Johnson	6 ft 0 in (1.83 m)	Sr	Rogers	Toledo, OH
F	15	Hailey Brown	6 ft 1 in (1.85 m)	Jr	The Rise Centre Academy	Hamilton, Ontario
G	23	Danielle Rauch	5 ft 8 in (1.73 m)	So	Bishop Ludden	Syracuse, NY
G	24	Michelle Sidor	5 ft 8 in (1.73 m)	Fr	Saddle River Day	Upper Saddle River, NJ
F	33	Emily Kiser	6 ft 3 in (1.91 m)	So	Noblesville	Noblesville, IN
C	34	Izabel Varejão	6 ft 4 in (1.93 m)	Fr	Neuse Christian Academy	Vitória, Brazil

Head coach

- Kim Barnes Arico (Montclair State)

Assistant coach(es)

- Wesley Brooks (West Virginia)
- Toyelle Wilson (Manhattan)
- Yvonne Sanchez (Alliant)

Legend

- (C) Team captain
- (S) Suspended
- (I) Ineligible
- (W) Walk-on
- Injured
- Current redshirt

Roster
Last update: August 26, 2019

== Schedule ==
Date time, TV	Rank^{#}	Opponent^{#}	Result	Record	Site (attendance) city, state
Exhibition
October 30, 2019*; 7:00 pm	No. 25	Northwood	W 97–46	–	Crisler Center (1,092); Ann Arbor, MI
Non-conference regular season
November 8, 2019*; 7:00 pm, BTN Plus	No. 25	Western Michigan	W 76–55	1–0	Crisler Center (2,568); Ann Arbor, MI
November 10, 2019*; 2:00 pm, BTN Plus	No. 25	Bradley	W 77–57	2–0	Crisler Center (2,338); Ann Arbor, MI
November 15, 2019*; 2:00 pm	No. 24	vs. Kent State; Akron Classic	W 88–53	3–0	James A. Rhodes Arena (213); Akron, OH
November 16, 2019*; 2:30 pm	No. 24	at Akron; Akron Classic	W 80–71	4–0	James A. Rhodes Arena (976); Akron, OH
November 23, 2019*; 1:00 pm, BTN Plus	No. 21	Notre Dame	L 72–76	4–1	Crisler Center (4,008); Ann Arbor, MI
November 27, 2019*; 2:00 pm		at Eastern Michigan	W 57–38	5–1	Convocation Center (1,354); Ypsilanti, MI
December 1, 2019*; 1:00 pm, BTN Plus		Morgan State	W 80–48	6–1	Crisler Center (2,107); Ann Arbor, MI
December 5, 2019*; 9:00 pm, ESPN	No. 24	Syracuse; ACC–Big Ten Women's Challenge	W 84–76 ^{OT}	7–1	Crisler Center (1,832); Ann Arbor, MI
December 8, 2019*; 2:00 pm, BTN Plus	No. 24	Oakland	W 79–64	8–1	Crisler Center (2,154); Ann Arbor, MI
December 14, 2019*; 3:30 pm, BTN Plus	No. 24	Appalachian State	W 62–35	9–1	Crisler Center (2,608); Ann Arbor, MI
December 22, 2019*; 1:30 pm, ACCN	No. 24	vs. No. 8 Florida State; Basketball Hall of Fame Women's Showcase	L 69–79	9–2	Mohegan Sun Arena (7,238); Uncasville, CT
Big Ten conference season
December 28, 2019; 8:00 pm, BTN	No. 23	at No. 12 Maryland	L 55–70	9–3 (0–1)	Xfinity Center (6,203); College Park, MD
December 31, 2019; 2:00 pm, BTN Plus		Penn State	W 82–48	10–3 (1–1)	Crisler Center (5,012); Ann Arbor, MI
January 5, 2020; 12:00 pm, ESPN2		Michigan State; Rivalry	W 89–69	11–3 (2–1)	Crisler Center (11,068); Ann Arbor, MI
January 9, 2020; 6:00 pm, BTN	No. 24	at Ohio State; Rivalry	L 69–78	11–4 (2–2)	Value City Arena (4,230); Columbus, OH
January 12, 2020; 12:00 pm, ESPN2	No. 24	No. 17 Maryland	L 49–77	11–5 (2–3)	Crisler Center (2,608); Ann Arbor, MI
January 16, 2020; 8:00 pm, BTN Plus		at Wisconsin	W 68–56	12–5 (3–3)	Kohl Center (3,191); Madison, WI
January 19, 2020; 5:00 pm, BTN		at Nebraska	L 71–74	12–6 (3–4)	Pinnacle Bank Arena; Lincoln, NE
January 26, 2020; 2:00 pm, BTN Plus		Rutgers	W 71–57	13–6 (4–4)	Crisler Center (3,676); Ann Arbor, MI
January 30, 2020; 8:00 pm, BTN Plus		at No. 23 Northwestern	L 73–81	13–7 (4–5)	Welsh–Ryan Arena (1,133); Evanston, IL
February 2, 2020; 12:00 pm, BTN		No. 18 Iowa	W 78–63	14–7 (5–5)	Crisler Center (3,124); Ann Arbor, MI
February 6, 2020; 6:00 pm, BTN		Purdue	W 66–63	15–7 (6–5)	Crisler Center (2,076); Ann Arbor, MI
February 10, 2020; 7:00 pm, BTN		at Minnesota	W 77–52	16–7 (7–5)	Williams Arena (3,423); Minneapolis, MN
February 13, 2020; 7:00 pm, BTN Plus		No. 19 Northwestern	L 60–66	16–8 (7–6)	Crisler Center (2,354); Ann Arbor, MI
February 16, 2020; 12:00 pm, BTN		at Rutgers	L 41–62	16–9 (7–7)	Louis Brown Athletic Center (2,571); Piscataway, NJ
February 19, 2020; 7:00 pm, BTN Plus		Illinois	W 80–59	17–9 (8–7)	Crisler Center (2,388); Ann Arbor, MI
February 23, 2020; 5:00 pm, BTN		at Michigan State; Rivalry	W 65–57	18–9 (9–7)	Breslin Center (11,462); East Lansing, MI
February 27, 2020; 7:00 pm, BTN Plus		at Penn State	W 80–66	19–9 (10–7)	Bryce Jordan Center (1,691); University Park, PA
March 1, 2020; 12:00 pm, BTN Plus		No. 22 Indiana	L 60–78	19–10 (10–8)	Crisler Center (3,719); Ann Arbor, MI
Big Ten Women's Tournament
March 5, 2020; 6:30 pm, BTN	(7)	vs. (10) Nebraska; Second round	W 81–75	20–10	Bankers Life Fieldhouse; Indianapolis, IN
March 6, 2020; 6:30 pm, BTN	(7)	vs. (2) No. 11 Northwestern; Quarterfinals	W 67–59	21–10	Bankers Life Fieldhouse; Indianapolis, IN
March 7, 2020; 9:00 pm, BTN	(7)	vs. (6) Ohio State; Semifinals	L 60–66	21–11	Bankers Life Fieldhouse; Indianapolis, IN
*Non-conference game. ^{#}Rankings from AP Poll. (#) Tournament seedings in parentheses. All times are in Eastern Time. Source:

== Rankings ==
Ranking movement Legend: ██ Increase in ranking. ██ Decrease in ranking. NR = Not ranked. RV = Received votes.
Poll	Pre	Wk 2	Wk 3	Wk 4	Wk 5	Wk 6	Wk 7	Wk 8	Wk 9	Wk 10	Wk 11	Wk 12	Wk 13	Wk 14	Wk 15	Wk 16	Wk 17	Wk 18	Wk 19	Final
AP	25	24	21	RV	24	24	24	23	RV	24	NR	NR	NR	NR	NR	NR	NR	NR	NR	NR
Coaches	24	24^	19	RV	25	22	22	23	RV	RV	NR	NR	NR	NR	NR	NR	NR	NR	NR	NR

^Coaches did not release a Week 2 poll.
