= 2019–20 Northwestern Wildcats women's basketball team =

American college basketball season

2019–20 Northwestern Wildcats women's basketball

Big Ten Regular season co-champions
- Conference: Big Ten Conference

Ranking
- Coaches: No. 13
- AP: No. 12
- Record: 26–4 (16–2 Big Ten)
- Head coach: Joe McKeown (12th season)
- Assistant coaches: Kate Popovec; Preston Reid; Tangela Smith
- Home arena: Welsh–Ryan Arena

2019–20 Big Ten women's basketball standings
	Conf.				Overall
Team	W		L	PCT	W		L	PCT
No. 4 Maryland†	16	–	2	.889	28	–	4	.875
No. 12 Northwestern	16	–	2	.889	26	–	4	.867
No. 21 Iowa	14	–	4	.778	23	–	7	.767
No. 20 Indiana	13	–	5	.722	24	–	8	.750
Rutgers	11	–	7	.611	22	–	9	.710
Ohio State	11	–	7	.611	21	–	12	.636
Michigan	10	–	8	.556	21	–	11	.656
Michigan State	9	–	9	.500	16	–	14	.533
Purdue	8	–	10	.444	18	–	14	.563
Nebraska	7	–	11	.389	17	–	13	.567
Minnesota	5	–	13	.278	16	–	15	.516
Wisconsin	3	–	15	.167	12	–	19	.387
Illinois	2	–	16	.111	11	–	19	.367
Penn State	1	–	17	.056	7	–	23	.233
† 2020 Big Ten tournament winner Rankings from AP poll

The 2019–20 Northwestern Wildcats women's basketball team represented Northwestern University during the 2019–20 NCAA Division I women's basketball season as members of the Big Ten Conference. The Wildcats were led by head coach Joe McKeown, in his 12th year coaching the team. They returned to play their home games at Welsh–Ryan Arena after a renovation relocated them the prior season.

== Roster ==
2019–20 Northwestern Wildcats women's basketball team
Players
Coaches

Pos.	#	Name	Height	Year	Previous school	Hometown
G	0	Jess Sancataldo	6 ft 0 in (1.83 m)	So	Turamurra	Sydney, Australia
G	1	Kaylah Rainey	5 ft 6 in (1.68 m)	Fr	Belleville East	Belleville, IL
G	2	Lauryn Satterwhite	5 ft 7 in (1.7 m)	RS So	Valley Vista	Avondale, AZ
G	3	Sydney Wood	5 ft 11 in (1.8 m)	So	St. John's College	Olney, MD
F	4	Bryana Hopkins	6 ft 2 in (1.88 m)	Sr	William Fremd	Palatine, IL
G	10	Lindsey Pulliam (C)	5 ft 10 in (1.78 m)	Jr	Our Lady of Good Counsel	Silver Spring, MD
G	11	Brooke Pikiell	5 ft 10 in (1.78 m)	Jr	Rutgers Prep	Far Hills, NJ
G	12	Veronica Burton	5 ft 9 in (1.75 m)	So	Newton South	Newton, MA
F	15	Courtney Shaw	6 ft 0 in (1.83 m)	So	Perry Hall	Perry Hall, MD
F/C	21	Abbie Wolf	6 ft 4 in (1.93 m)	Sr	Greenwich	White Plains, NY
G	22	Byrdy Galernik	5 ft 8 in (1.73 m)	Sr	Toledo Central Catholic	Perrysburg, OH
G	24	Jordan Hamilton	5 ft 8 in (1.73 m)	Jr	Liberty	Frisco, TX
F	32	Amber Jamison	6 ft 0 in (1.83 m)	RS Sr	Rochester Adams	Rochester Hills, MI
G	33	Laya Hartman	5 ft 11 in (1.8 m)	Fr	Okemos	Okemos, MI
F/C	44	Aby Scheid (C)	6 ft 2 in (1.88 m)	Sr	Elk River	Elk River, MN

Head coach

- Joe McKeown (Mercer)

Assistant coach(es)

- Kate Popovec (Northwestern)
- Preston Reid (Ball State)
- Tangela Smith (Iowa)

Legend

- (C) Team captain
- (S) Suspended
- (I) Ineligible
- (W) Walk-on
- Injured
- Current redshirt

Roster

== Schedule and results ==
Date time, TV	Rank^{#}	Opponent^{#}	Result	Record	Site (attendance) city, state
Exhibition
Nov 6, 2019*; 7:00 pm		Lewis	W 89–34		Welsh–Ryan Arena (112); Evanston, IL
Non-conference regular season
Nov 10, 2019*; 3:30 pm		Loyola (MD)	W 67–46	1–0	Welsh–Ryan Arena (760); Evanston, IL
Nov 14, 2019*; 7:00 pm		at Marquette	W 64–56 ^{OT}	2–0	Al McGuire Center (879); Milwaukee, WI
Nov 17, 2019*; 2:00 pm, ACCN		at Duke	W 63–42	3–0	Cameron Indoor Stadium (4,118); Durham, NC
Nov 21, 2019*; 7:00 pm		Valparaiso	W 69–48	4–0	Welsh–Ryan Arena (678); Evanston, IL
Nov 27, 2019*; 2:00 pm		Colgate	W 73–44	5–0	Welsh–Ryan Arena (945); Evanston, IL
Dec 1, 2019*; 2:00 pm		No. 16 DePaul	L 68–70	5–1	Welsh–Ryan Arena (1,416); Evanston, IL
Dec 4, 2019*; 7:00 pm		Boston College; ACC–Big Ten Women's Challenge	W 66–63	6–1	Welsh–Ryan Arena (610); Evanston, IL
Dec 7, 2019*; 2:00 pm		Dartmouth	W 79–37	7–1	Welsh–Ryan Arena (866); Evanston, IL
Dec 16, 2019*; 11:00 am		UT Arlington	W 74–47	8–1	Welsh–Ryan Arena (3,432); Evanston, IL
Dec 20, 2019*; 1:30 pm		vs. East Carolina; West Palm Invitational	W 64–45	9–1	Student Life Center (125); West Palm Beach, FL
Dec 21, 2019*; 1:30 pm		vs. Xavier; West Palm Invitational	W 79–59	10–1	Student Life Center (125); West Palm Beach, FL
Big Ten regular season
Dec 28, 2019; 2:00 pm		at Illinois	W 77–50	11–1 (1–0)	State Farm Center (2,099); Champaign, IL
Dec 31, 2019; 4:00 pm, BTN		No. 12 Maryland	W 81–58	12–1 (2–0)	Welsh–Ryan Arena (1,003); Evanston, IL
Jan 5, 2020; 1:00 pm, BTN		Iowa	L 51–77	12–2 (2–1)	Welsh–Ryan Arena (1,843); Evanston, IL
Jan 9, 2020; 7:00 pm		at Minnesota	W 56–54	13–2 (3–1)	Williams Arena (3,001); Minneapolis, MN
Jan 12, 2020; 4:00 pm		Purdue	W 61–56	14–2 (4–1)	Welsh–Ryan Arena (1,464); Evanston, IL
Jan 16, 2020; 6:00 pm		at No. 15 Indiana	W 71–69 ^{OT}	15–2 (5–1)	Simon Skjodt Assembly Hall (3,805); Bloomington, IN
Jan 19, 2020; 2:00 pm		Penn State	W 85–59	16–2 (6–1)	Welsh–Ryan Arena (1,424); Evanston, IL
Jan 23, 2020; 5:30 pm	No. 22	at Michigan State	W 76–48	17–2 (7–1)	Breslin Center (3,963); East Lansing, MI
Jan 26, 2020; 12:00 pm	No. 22	at No. 20 Maryland	L 61-70	17–3 (7–2)	Xfinty Center (8,276); College Park, MD
Jan 30, 2020; 5:30 pm	No. 23	Michigan	W 81–73	18–3 (8–2)	Welsh–Ryan Arena (1,133); Evanston, IL
Feb 2, 2020; 11:00 am	No. 23	at Penn State	W 82–59	19–3 (9–2)	Bryce Jordan Center (2,362); University Park, PA
Feb 10, 2020; 8:00 pm, BTN	No. 19	Michigan State	W 85–55	20–3 (10–2)	Welsh–Ryan Arena (864); Evanston, IL
Feb 13, 2020; 6:00 pm	No. 19	at Michigan	W 66–60	21–3 (11–2)	Crisler Center (2,354); Ann Arbor, MI
Feb 16, 2020; 2:00 pm	No. 19	Nebraska	W 60–56	22–3 (12–2)	Welsh–Ryan Arena (2,172); Evanston, IL
Feb 16, 2020; 2:00 pm	No. 18	Rutgers	W 82–65	23–3 (13–2)	Welsh–Ryan Arena (1,142); Evanston, IL
Feb 22, 2020; 11:00 am	No. 18	at Wisconsin	W 82–66	24–3 (14–2)	Kohl Center (4,172); Madison, WI
Feb 25, 2020; 5:00 pm, BTN	No. 14	at Ohio State	W 69–55	25–3 (15–2)	Value City Arena (4,403); Columbus, OH
Feb 29, 2020; 1:00 pm, BTN	No. 14	Illinois	W 75–58	26–3 (16–2)	Welsh–Ryan Arena (4,016); Evanston, IL
Big Ten Women's Tournament
Mar 6, 2020; 5:30 pm, BTN	(2) No. 11	vs. (7) Michigan; Quarterfinals	L 59–67	26–4	Bankers Life Fieldhouse; Indianapolis, IN
*Non-conference game. ^{#}Rankings from AP Poll. (#) Tournament seedings in parentheses. All times are in Central Time.

== Rankings ==
Regular season polls
Poll	Pre- season	Week 2	Week 3	Week 4	Week 5	Week 6	Week 7	Week 8	Week 9	Week 10	Week 11	Week 12	Week 13	Week 14	Week 15	Week 16	Week 17	Week 18	Week 19	Final
AP			RV	RV	RV			RV	RV	RV	RV	22	23	21	19	18	14	11	12	
Coaches				RV	RV	RV	RV	RV	RV	RV	RV	25	RV	23	21	20	19	13		

Legend
	Increase in ranking
	Decrease in ranking
	Not ranked previous week
(RV)	Received Votes

== See also ==
2019–20 Northwestern Wildcats men's basketball team
