= 2019–20 Minnesota Golden Gophers women's basketball team =

Intercollegiate basketball season

2019–20 Minnesota Golden Gophers women's basketball
- Conference: Big Ten Conference
- Record: 16–15 (5–13 Big Ten)
- Head coach: Lindsay Whalen (2nd season)
- Assistant coaches: Danielle O'Banion; Carly Thibault-DuDonis; Kelly Roysland
- Home arena: Williams Arena

2019–20 Big Ten women's basketball standings
	Conf.				Overall
Team	W		L	PCT	W		L	PCT
No. 4 Maryland†	16	–	2	.889	28	–	4	.875
No. 12 Northwestern	16	–	2	.889	26	–	4	.867
No. 21 Iowa	14	–	4	.778	23	–	7	.767
No. 20 Indiana	13	–	5	.722	24	–	8	.750
Rutgers	11	–	7	.611	22	–	9	.710
Ohio State	11	–	7	.611	21	–	12	.636
Michigan	10	–	8	.556	21	–	11	.656
Michigan State	9	–	9	.500	16	–	14	.533
Purdue	8	–	10	.444	18	–	14	.563
Nebraska	7	–	11	.389	17	–	13	.567
Minnesota	5	–	13	.278	16	–	15	.516
Wisconsin	3	–	15	.167	12	–	19	.387
Illinois	2	–	16	.111	11	–	19	.367
Penn State	1	–	17	.056	7	–	23	.233
† 2020 Big Ten tournament winner Rankings from AP poll

The 2019–20 Minnesota Golden Gophers women's basketball team represent the University of Minnesota during the 2019–20 NCAA Division I women's basketball season. The Golden Gophers, led by second-year head coach Lindsay Whalen, play their home games at Williams Arena as members of the Big Ten Conference.

The Golden Gophers finished the season 16–15 and 5–12 in Big Ten play to finish in eleventh place. As the eleven seed in the Big Ten tournament, they defeated Penn State in the first round, before falling to Ohio State in the second Round. The NCAA tournament and WNIT were cancelled due to the COVID-19 outbreak.

== Offseason ==
=== Departures ===
Name	Number	Pos.	Height	Year	Hometown	Notes
Delanynie Byrne	11	F	6'2"	Freshman	Arvada, CO	Transferred to UNLV
Kenisha Bell	23	G	5'9"	Redshirt Senior	Minneapolis, MN	Drafted in the 2019 WNBA draft (3rd round, 30th overall)
Palma Kaposi	25	F	6'2"	Senior	Pécs, Hungary	Graduated
Irene Garrido Perez	31	F	6'1"	Senior	Granada, Spain	Graduated
Annalese Lamke	41	C	6'3"	Senior	Galesville, WI	Graduated

=== Arrivals ===
Name	Number	Pos.	Height	Year	Hometown	Previous School	Notes
Masha Adashchyk	23	G	5'11"	Senior	Minsk, Belarus	Panola College (NJCAA)	Transferred from NJCAA - Able to Play Immediately
Kadi Sissoko	30	F	6'2"	Sophomore	Paris, France	Syracuse	Per NCAA Transfer Rules, Will Sit Out Season

=== 2019 Recruiting Class ===
College recruiting information
Name	Hometown	School	Height	Weight	Commit date
Jasmine Powell; G	Detroit, MI	Detroit Country Day School	5 ft 6 in (1.68 m)	N/A	
Jasmine Powell; G	Recruit ratings: ESPN: (94)				
Klarke Sconiers; F	Queens, NY	Christ The King Regional High School	6 ft 3 in (1.91 m)	N/A	
Klarke Sconiers; F	Recruit ratings: ESPN: (90)				
Grace Cumming; F	Des Moines, IA	Des Moines Roosevelt High School	6 ft 3 in (1.91 m)	N/A	
Grace Cumming; F	Recruit ratings: ESPN: (88)				
Justice Ross; F	Des Moines, IA	Des Moines East High School	6 ft 0 in (1.83 m)	N/A	
Justice Ross; F	Recruit ratings: ESPN: (88)				
Sara Scalia; G	Stillwater, MN	Stillwater High School	5 ft 8 in (1.73 m)	N/A	
Sara Scalia; G	Recruit ratings: ESPN: (88)				
Overall recruit ranking:
Note: In many cases, Scout, Rivals, 247Sports, On3, and ESPN may conflict in their listings of height and weight.; In these cases, the average was taken. ESPN grades are on a 100-point scale.; Sources:

== Roster ==
2019–20 Minnesota Golden Gophers women's basketball team
Players
Coaches

Pos.	#	Name	Height	Year	Previous school	Hometown
F/C	2	Barbora Tomancova	6 ft 2 in (1.88 m)	RS Fr	SGLD Brno	Brno, Czech Republic
G/F	3	Destiny Pitts	5 ft 10 in (1.78 m)	Jr	Detroit Country Day	Detroit, MI
G	4	Jasmine Powell	5 ft 6 in (1.68 m)	Fr	Detroit Country Day	Detroit, MI
F	5	Taiye Bello	6 ft 2 in (1.88 m)	Sr	Southfield-Lathrup HS	Southfield, MI
G	12	Mercedes Staples	5 ft 10 in (1.78 m)	So	Viewmont HS	Centerville, UT
G	14	Sara Scalia	5 ft 10 in (1.78 m)	Fr	Stillwater HS	Stillwater, MN
F	20	Kehinde Bello	6 ft 2 in (1.88 m)	Sr	Southfield-Lathrup HS	Southfield, MI
G	21	Jasmine Brunson	5 ft 8 in (1.73 m)	Sr	Mary Louis Academy	Queens, NY
G	23	Masha Adashchyk	5 ft 11 in (1.8 m)	Sr	Panola College	Minsk, Belarus
F	24	Justice Ross	6 ft 10 in (2.08 m)	Fr	Des Moines East HS	Des Moines, IA
C	25	Klarke Sconiers	6 ft 2 in (1.88 m)	Fr	Christ the King HS	Queens, NY
F	30	Kadi Sissoko	6 ft 2 in (1.88 m)	So	Lycée Marcelin Berthelot; Syracuse	Paris, France
G	34	Gadiva Hubbard	5 ft 9 in (1.75 m)	RS Jr	Princess Anne HS	Virginia Beach, VA
F	43	Grace Cumming	6 ft 3 in (1.91 m)	Fr	Des Moines Roosevelt HS	Des Moines, IA

Head coach

- Lindsay Whalen (Minnesota)

Assistant coach(es)

- Danielle O'Banion (Boston College)
- Carly Thibault-DuDonis (Monmouth)
- Kelly Roysland (Minnesota)

Legend

- (C) Team captain
- (S) Suspended
- (I) Ineligible
- (W) Walk-on
- Injured
- Current redshirt

Roster
Last update: November 5, 2019

== Schedule and results ==
Date time, TV	Rank^{#}	Opponent^{#}	Result	Record	Site (attendance) city, state
Non-conference regular season
11/05/2019*; 3:00 pm, BTN Plus	No. 23	Missouri State	L 69–77	0–1	Williams Arena (2,860); Minneapolis, MN
11/10/2019*; 2:00 pm, BTN Plus	No. 23	Vermont	W 90–58	1–1	Williams Arena (3,456); Minneapolis, MN
11/14/2019*; 12:00 pm, BTN Plus		Milwaukee	W 77–61	2–1	Williams Arena (4,081); Minneapolis, MN
11/17/2019*; 3:00 pm, BTN		No. 19 Arizona State	W 80–66	3–1	Williams Arena (4,862); Minneapolis, MN
11/23/2019*; 2:00 pm, BTN Plus		Montana State	W 71–60	4–1	Williams Arena (3,497); Minneapolis, MN
11/26/2019*; 7:00 pm, BTN Plus		Bryant	W 101–56	5–1	Williams Arena (2,770); Minneapolis, MN
12/04/2019*; 7:00 pm, ACCN		at Notre Dame; ACC–Big Ten Women's Challenge	W 75-67	6-1	Joyce Center (7,093); South Bend, IN
12/08/2019*; 1:00 pm		at American	W 70–53	7–1	Bender Arena (381); Washington, D.C.
12/10/2019*; 6:00 pm, ESPN+		at George Washington	W 83–50	8–1	Charles E. Smith Center (473); Washington, D.C.
12/15/2019*; 1:00 pm, BTN Plus		UC Davis	W 76–67	9–1	Williams Arena (4,673); Minneapolis, MN
12/21/2019*; 12:00 pm, BTN Plus		Lehigh	W 77–49	10–1	Williams Arena (4,300); Minneapolis, MN
Big Ten conference season
12/28/2019; 8:00 pm, BTN Plus		at Penn State	W 81–74	11–1 (1–0)	Bryce Jordan Center (1,923); University Park, PA
12/31/2019; 4:00 pm, BTN Plus	No. 24	Ohio State	L 63–66	11–2 (1–1)	Williams Arena (3,982); Minneapolis, MN
01/04/2020; 5:00 pm, BTN	No. 24	at Nebraska	L 58–72	11–3 (1–2)	Pinnacle Bank Arena (5,940); Lincoln, NE
01/09/2020; 7:00 pm, BTN Plus		Northwestern	L 54–56	11–4 (1–3)	Williams Arena (3,001); Minneapolis, MN
01/12/2020; 2:00 pm, BTN		at Illinois	L 71–74	11–5 (1–4)	State Farm Center (1,333); Champaign, IL
01/16/2020; 7:00 pm, BTN Plus		No. 22 Iowa	L 75–76	11–6 (1–5)	Williams Arena (3,412); Minneapolis, MN
01/19/2020; 1:00 pm, BTN Plus		at Purdue	W 72–59	12–6 (2–5)	Mackey Arena (6,077); West Lafayette, IN
01/22/2020; 7:00 pm, BTN Plus		Wisconsin	L 62–72	12–7 (2–6)	Williams Arena (3,619); Minneapolis, MN
01/27/2020; 5:00 pm, BTN		at No. 20 Indiana	L 52–65	12–8 (2–7)	Simon Skjodt Assembly Hall (3,463); Bloomington, IN
01/30/2020; 7:00 pm, BTN Plus		Nebraska	W 67–61	13–8 (3–7)	Williams Arena (3,568); Minneapolis, MN
02/02/2020; 2:00 pm, ESPN2		Rutgers	W 73–71 ^{2OT}	14–8 (4–7)	Williams Arena; Minneapolis, MN
02/06/2020; 7:00 pm, BTN Plus		at Wisconsin	W 73–64	15–8 (5–7)	Kohl Center (3,581); Madison, WI
02/10/2020; 6:00 pm, BTN		Michigan	L 52–77	15–9 (5–8)	Williams Arena (3,423); Minneapolis, MN
02/13/2020; 6:00 pm, BTN Plus		at Ohio State	L 76–99	15–10 (5–9)	Value City Arena (3,721); Columbus, OH
02/17/2020; 6:00 pm, BTN		at Michigan State	L 54–66	15–11 (5–10)	Breslin Center (4,608); East Lansing, MI
02/22/2020; 5:00 pm, BTN Plus		No. 24 Indiana	L 69–75	15–12 (5–11)	Williams Arena (4,453); Minneapolis, MN
02/27/2020; 6:30 pm, BTN Plus		at No. 18 Iowa	L 82–90	15–13 (5–12)	Carver–Hawkeye Arena (8,297); Iowa City, IA
03/01/2020; 3:00 pm, BTN Plus		No. 7 Maryland	L 44–99	15–14 (5–13)	Williams Arena (6,013); Minneapolis, MN
Big Ten Women's Tournament
03/04/2020; 3:30 pm, BTN	(11)	vs. (14) Penn State; First round	W 85–65	16–14	Bankers Life Fieldhouse (3,793); Indianapolis, IN
Mar 5, 2020; 12:00 pm, BTN	(11)	vs. (6) Ohio State; Second round	L 56–77	16–15	Bankers Life Fieldhouse (4,349); Indianapolis, IN
*Non-conference game. ^{#}Rankings from AP Poll. (#) Tournament seedings in parentheses. All times are in Central Time.

== Rankings ==
Regular season polls
Poll	Pre- Season	Week 2	Week 3	Week 4	Week 5	Week 6	Week 7	Week 8	Week 9	Week 10	Week 11	Week 12	Week 13	Week 14	Week 15	Week 16	Week 17	Week 18	Week 19	Final
AP	23	RV	RV																	N/A
Coaches	RV																			

Legend
	Increase in ranking
	Decrease in ranking
	Not ranked previous week
(RV)	Received Votes

== See also ==
- 2019–20 Minnesota Golden Gophers men's basketball team
