= 2020 Big Ten women's basketball tournament =

- Classification: Division I
- Season: 2019–20
- Teams: 14
- Site: Bankers Life Fieldhouse; Indianapolis, IN
- Champions: Maryland (4th title)
- Winning coach: Brenda Frese (4th title)
- MVP: Ashley Owusu (Maryland)
- Attendance: 34,709
- Television: BTN, ESPN2

2019–20 Big Ten women's basketball standings
	Conf.				Overall
Team	W		L	PCT	W		L	PCT
No. 4 Maryland†	16	–	2	.889	28	–	4	.875
No. 12 Northwestern	16	–	2	.889	26	–	4	.867
No. 21 Iowa	14	–	4	.778	23	–	7	.767
No. 20 Indiana	13	–	5	.722	24	–	8	.750
Rutgers	11	–	7	.611	22	–	9	.710
Ohio State	11	–	7	.611	21	–	12	.636
Michigan	10	–	8	.556	21	–	11	.656
Michigan State	9	–	9	.500	16	–	14	.533
Purdue	8	–	10	.444	18	–	14	.563
Nebraska	7	–	11	.389	17	–	13	.567
Minnesota	5	–	13	.278	16	–	15	.516
Wisconsin	3	–	15	.167	12	–	19	.387
Illinois	2	–	16	.111	11	–	19	.367
Penn State	1	–	17	.056	7	–	23	.233
† 2020 Big Ten tournament winner As of March 12, 2025; Rankings from AP poll

The 2020 Big Ten women's basketball tournament was a postseason tournament scheduled for March 4–8, 2020 at Bankers Life Fieldhouse in Indianapolis.

== Seeds ==
All 14 Big Ten schools are participating in the tournament. Teams will be seeded by 2019–20 Big Ten Conference season record. The top 10 teams receive a first-round bye and the top 4 teams receive a double bye.

Seeding for the tournament will be determined at the close of the regular conference season:

Seed	School	Conf	Tiebreak 1	Tiebreak 2
1	Maryland^{‡##}	16–2	1–1 vs. NW	1–1 vs. IOWA
2	Northwestern^{‡##}	16–2	1–1 vs. MD	0–1 vs. IOWA
3	Iowa^{##}	14–4		
4	Indiana^{##}	13–5		
5	Rutgers^{#}	11–7	1–0 vs. OSU	
6	Ohio State^{#}	11–7	0–1 vs. RUTG	
7	Michigan^{#}	10–8		
8	Michigan State^{#}	9–9		
9	Purdue^{#}	8–10		
10	Nebraska^{#}	7–11		
11	Minnesota	5–13		
12	Wisconsin	3–15		
13	Illinois	2–16		
14	Penn State	1–17		
‡ – Big Ten Conference regular season champions. ## – Received a double bye in the conference tournament. # – Received a first-round bye in the conference tournament. Overall record are as of the end of the regular season.

== Schedule ==
Session	Game	Time	Matchup^{#}	Television	Attendance	Score
First Round – Wednesday, March 4
1	1	2:00 pm	#13 Illinois vs. #12 Wisconsin	BTN	3,793	55–71
1	2	4:30 pm	#14 Penn State vs. #11 Minnesota	BTN	3,793	65–85
Second Round – Thursday, March 5
2	3	12:00 pm	#9 Purdue vs. #8 Michigan State	BTN	4,158	72–63
2	4	2:30 pm	#12 Wisconsin vs. #5 Rutgers	BTN	4,158	55–63
3	5	6:30 pm	#10 Nebraska vs. #7 Michigan	BTN	4,349	75–81
3	6	9:00 pm	#11 Minnesota vs. #6 Ohio State	BTN	4,349	56–77
Quarterfinals – Friday, March 6
4	7	12:00 pm	#9 Purdue vs. #1 Maryland	BTN	5,711	62–74
4	8	2:30 pm	#5 Rutgers vs. #4 Indiana	BTN	5,711	60–78
5	9	6:30 pm	#7 Michigan vs. #2 Northwestern	BTN	4,798	67–59
5	10	9:00 pm	#6 Ohio State vs. #3 Iowa	BTN	4,798	87–66
Semifinals – Saturday, March 7
6	11	6:30 pm	#4 Indiana vs. #1 Maryland	BTN	7,213	51–66
6	12	9:00 pm	#7 Michigan vs. #6 Ohio State	BTN	7,213	60–66
Championship – Sunday, March 8
7	13	6:00 pm	#1 Maryland vs. #6 Ohio State	ESPN2	4,687	82–65

*Game times in Eastern Time. #Rankings denote tournament seeding.

== Bracket ==
- All times are Eastern.

First round Wednesday, March 4 BTN
12	Wisconsin	71
13	Illinois	55
11	Minnesota	85
14	Penn State	65

Second round Thursday, March 5 BTN
8	Michigan State	63
9	Purdue	72
5	Rutgers	63
12	Wisconsin	55
7	Michigan	81
10	Nebraska	75
6	Ohio State	77
11	Minnesota	56

Quarterfinals; Friday, March 6 BTN
1	Maryland	74
9	Purdue	62
4	Indiana	78
5	Rutgers	60
2	Northwestern	59
7	Michigan	67
3	Iowa	66
6	Ohio State	87

Semifinals; Saturday, March 7 BTN
1	Maryland	66
4	Indiana	51
7	Michigan	60
6	Ohio State	66

Championship; Sunday, March 8 ESPN2
1	Maryland	82
6	Ohio State	65

* denotes overtime period

== See also ==
- 2020 Big Ten Conference men's basketball tournament
