= 2019–20 Purdue Boilermakers women's basketball team =

Intercollegiate basketball season

2019–20 Purdue Boilermakers women's basketball
- Conference: Big Ten Conference
- Record: 18–14 (8–10 Big Ten)
- Head coach: Sharon Versyp (14th season)
- Assistant coaches: Melanie Balcomb; Beth Couture
- Home arena: Mackey Arena

2019–20 Big Ten women's basketball standings
	Conf.				Overall
Team	W		L	PCT	W		L	PCT
No. 4 Maryland†	16	–	2	.889	28	–	4	.875
No. 12 Northwestern	16	–	2	.889	26	–	4	.867
No. 21 Iowa	14	–	4	.778	23	–	7	.767
No. 20 Indiana	13	–	5	.722	24	–	8	.750
Rutgers	11	–	7	.611	22	–	9	.710
Ohio State	11	–	7	.611	21	–	12	.636
Michigan	10	–	8	.556	21	–	11	.656
Michigan State	9	–	9	.500	16	–	14	.533
Purdue	8	–	10	.444	18	–	14	.563
Nebraska	7	–	11	.389	17	–	13	.567
Minnesota	5	–	13	.278	16	–	15	.516
Wisconsin	3	–	15	.167	12	–	19	.387
Illinois	2	–	16	.111	11	–	19	.367
Penn State	1	–	17	.056	7	–	23	.233
† 2020 Big Ten tournament winner Rankings from AP poll

The 2019–20 Purdue Boilermakers women's basketball team represented Purdue University during the 2019–20 NCAA Division I women's basketball season. Boilermakers, led by 14th-year head coach Sharon Versyp, played their home games at Mackey Arena and were members of the Big Ten Conference.

== Roster ==
2019–20 Purdue Boilermakers women's basketball team
Players
Coaches

Pos.	#	Name	Height	Year	Previous school	Hometown
G	1	Karissa McLaughlin	5 ft 7 in (1.7 m)	Jr	Homestead	Fort Wayne, IN
G	2	Bria Harmon	5 ft 7 in (1.7 m)	Fr	Collins Hill	Atlanta, GA
G	3	Lyndsey Whilby (redshirt)	5 ft 11 in (1.8 m)	Jr	McEachern; Texas Tech	Powder Springs, GA
G	5	Cassidy Hardin	5 ft 10 in (1.78 m)	So	Center Grove	Bargersville, IN
G	11	Dominique Oden	5 ft 8 in (1.73 m)	Sr	Marist	Atlanta, GA
G	12	Roxane Makolo	5 ft 10 in (1.78 m)	Fr	Dawson College	Saint-Hubert, QC
G	13	Ajah Stallings	5 ft 9 in (1.75 m)	So	North Central	Indianapolis, IN
G	15	Léony Boudreau	5 ft 10 in (1.78 m)	Jr	Dawson College	Montreal, QC
F	22	Jenelle Grant (redshirt)	6 ft 0 in (1.83 m)	Sr	Harris Westminster; Pacific	London, England
G	23	Kayana Traylor	5 ft 9 in (1.75 m)	So	Martinsville	Martinsville, IN
G	25	Tamara Farquhar	6 ft 0 in (1.83 m)	Jr	Dawson College	Pierrefonds, Quebec
F	30	Nyagoa Gony	6 ft 2 in (1.88 m)	So	Lincoln	Lincoln, NE
F	32	Ae'Rianna Harris	6 ft 1 in (1.85 m)	Sr	Lawrence North	Indianapolis, IN
F	35	Rickie Woltman	6 ft 4 in (1.93 m)	Fr	Incarnate Word	St. Louis, MO
C	45	Fatou Diagne	6 ft 4 in (1.93 m)	RS Sr	Kocc Barma	Thiès, Senegal

Head coach

- Sharon Versyp (Purdue)

Assistant coach(es)

- Melanie Balcomb (Trenton State)
- Beth Couture (Erskine)

Legend

- (C) Team captain
- (S) Suspended
- (I) Ineligible
- (W) Walk-on
- Injured
- Current redshirt

Roster
Last update: October 28, 2019

== Schedule ==
Date time, TV	Rank^{#}	Opponent^{#}	Result	Record	Site (attendance) city, state
Exhibition
Nov 3, 2019*; 12:00 pm, BTN Plus		Southern Indiana	W 62–44		Mackey Arena (5,575); West Lafayette, IN
Non-conference regular season
Nov 10, 2019*; 2:00 pm, BTN Plus		Milwaukee	W 68–55	1–0	Mackey Arena (5,717); West Lafayette, IN
Nov 14, 2019*; 7:00 pm, ESPN+		at Chattanooga	W 66–34	2–0	McKenzie Arena (1,509); Chattanooga, TN
Nov 17, 2019*; 2:00 pm, BTN Plus		Western Illinois	W 66–59	3–0	Mackey Arena (5,745); West Lafayette, IN
Nov 24, 2019*; 2:00 pm, BTN Plus		Northern Illinois	W 68–63	4–0	Mackey Arena (5,800); West Lafayette, IN
Nov 29, 2019*; 7:30 pm, FloHoops		vs. Drake; Gulf Coast Showcase	W 67–47	5–0	Hertz Arena (1,013); Estero, FL
Nov 30, 2019*; FloHoops		vs. Arizona State; Gulf Coast Showcase	W 59–52	6–0	Hertz Arena (389); Estero, FL
Dec 1, 2019*; FloHoops		vs. No. 22 Gonzaga; Gulf Coast Showcase	L 50–63	6–1	Hertz Arena (517); Estero, FL
Dec 5, 2019*; 7:00 pm, ACCNX		at Virginia Tech; ACC–Big Ten Women's Challenge	L 54–67	6–2	Cassell Coliseum (1,282); Blacksburg, VA
Dec 8, 2019*; 12:00 pm, BTN Plus		Kent State	W 77–64	7–2	Mackey Arena (5,585); West Lafayette, IN
Dec 15, 2019*; 2:00 pm, SECN+		at No. 5 South Carolina	L 51–85	7–3	Colonial Life Arena (11,306); Columbia, SC
Dec 18, 2019*; 12:00 pm, BTN Plus		Western Kentucky	W 67–50	8–3	Mackey Arena (7,106); West Lafayette, IN
Dec 21, 2019*; 12:00 am, BTN Plus		Bowling Green	W 81–74	9–3	Mackey Arena (5,742); West Lafayette, IN
Big Ten conference season
Dec 28, 2019; 12:00 pm, BTN Plus		at Ohio State	W 66–50	10–3 (1–0)	Value City Arena (4,212); Columbus, OH
Dec 31, 2019; 4:00 pm, BTN Plus		Wisconsin	W 72–61	11–3 (2–0)	Mackey Arena (6,080); West Lafayette, IN
Jan 5, 2020; 12:00 pm, BTN		Rutgers	L 53–59	11–4 (2–1)	Mackey Arena (7,441); West Lafayette, IN
Jan 9, 2020; 7:00 pm, BTN Plus		at No. 12 Indiana; Rivalry/Crimson and Gold Cup	L 48–66	11–5 (2–2)	Simon Skjodt Assembly Hall (5,159); Bloomington, IN
Jan 12, 2020; 5:00 pm, BTN Plus		at Northwestern	L 56–61	11–6 (2–3)	Welsh–Ryan Arena (1,464); Evansville, IL
Jan 16, 2020; 7:00 pm, BTN Plus		Illinois	W 81–67	12–6 (3–3)	Mackey Arena (5,886); West Lafayette, IN
Jan 19, 2020; 2:00 pm, BTN Plus		Minnesota	L 59–72	12–7 (3–4)	Mackey Arena (6,077); West Lafayette, IN
Jan 22, 2020; 8:00 pm, BTN Plus		at Nebraska	W 76–68	13–7 (4–4)	Pinnacle Bank Arena (3,819); Lincoln, NE
Jan 26, 2020; 2:00 pm, BTN		Penn State	W 81–68	14–7 (5–4)	Mackey Arena (6,057); West Lafayette, IN
Jan 30, 2020; 7:00 pm, BTN Plus		at Michigan State	W 76–66	15–7 (6–4)	Breslin Center (4,314); East Lansing, MI
Feb 3, 2020; 6:00 pm, BTN		No. 18 Indiana; Rivalry/Crimson and Gold Cup	L 54–66	15–8 (6–5)	Mackey Arena (8,161); West Lafayette, IN
Feb 6, 2020; 6:00 pm, BTN		at Michigan	L 63–66	15–9 (6–6)	Crisler Center (2,076); Ann Arbor, MI
Feb 9, 2020; 2:00 pm, BTN Plus		No. 20 Iowa	L 71–83	15–10 (6–7)	Mackey Arena (6,681); West Lafayette, IN
Feb 13, 2020; 8:00 pm, BTN Plus		at Wisconsin	W 62–59	16–10 (7–7)	Kohl Center (3,799); Madison, WI
Feb 16, 2020; 3:00 pm, BTN Plus		at Illinois	W 70–58	17–10 (8–7)	State Farm Center (2,119); Champaign, IL
Feb 20, 2020; 7:00 pm, BTN		Michigan State	L 63–65	17–11 (8–8)	Mackey Arena (5,908); West Lafayette, IN
Feb 25, 2020; 8:00 pm, BTN		at No. 7 Maryland	L 45–88	17–12 (8–9)	Xfinity Center (5,105); College Park, MD
Feb 29, 2020; 4:00 pm, BTN		Ohio State	L 56–77	17–13 (8–10)	Mackey Arena (6,753); West Lafayette, IN
Big Ten Women's Tournament
Mar 5, 2020; 12:00 pm, BTN	(9)	vs. (8) Michigan State; Second round	W 72–63	18–13	Bankers Life Fieldhouse; Indianapolis, IN
Mar 6, 2020; 12:00 pm, BTN	(9)	vs. (1) No. 6 Maryland; Quarterfinals	L 62–74	18–14	Bankers Life Fieldhouse; Indianapolis, IN
*Non-conference game. ^{#}Rankings from AP Poll. (#) Tournament seedings in parentheses. All times are in Eastern Time.

== Rankings ==
Regular season polls
Poll	Pre- season	Week 2	Week 3	Week 4	Week 5	Week 6	Week 7	Week 8	Week 9	Week 10	Week 11	Week 12	Week 13	Week 14	Week 15	Week 16	Week 17	Week 18	Week 19	Final
AP					RV	RV														N/A
Coaches					RV															

Legend
	Increase in ranking
	Decrease in ranking
	Not ranked previous week
(RV)	Received votes

== See also ==
- 2019–20 Purdue Boilermakers men's basketball team
