= 2019–20 Rutgers Scarlet Knights women's basketball team =

Intercollegiate basketball season

2019–20 Rutgers Scarlet Knights women's basketball

Junkanoo Jam champions
- Conference: Big Ten Conference
- Record: 22–9 (11–7 Big Ten)
- Head coach: C. Vivian Stringer (25th season)
- Assistant coaches: Timothy Eatman; Nadine Domond; Michelle Edwards
- Home arena: Louis Brown Athletic Center

2019–20 Big Ten women's basketball standings
	Conf.				Overall
Team	W		L	PCT	W		L	PCT
No. 4 Maryland†	16	–	2	.889	28	–	4	.875
No. 12 Northwestern	16	–	2	.889	26	–	4	.867
No. 21 Iowa	14	–	4	.778	23	–	7	.767
No. 20 Indiana	13	–	5	.722	24	–	8	.750
Rutgers	11	–	7	.611	22	–	9	.710
Ohio State	11	–	7	.611	21	–	12	.636
Michigan	10	–	8	.556	21	–	11	.656
Michigan State	9	–	9	.500	16	–	14	.533
Purdue	8	–	10	.444	18	–	14	.563
Nebraska	7	–	11	.389	17	–	13	.567
Minnesota	5	–	13	.278	16	–	15	.516
Wisconsin	3	–	15	.167	12	–	19	.387
Illinois	2	–	16	.111	11	–	19	.367
Penn State	1	–	17	.056	7	–	23	.233
† 2020 Big Ten tournament winner Rankings from AP poll

The 2019–20 Rutgers Scarlet Knights women's basketball team represented Rutgers University during the 2019–20 NCAA Division I women's basketball season. The Scarlet Knights, led by 25th year head coach C. Vivian Stringer, played their home games at the Louis Brown Athletic Center, better known as The RAC, as a member of the Big Ten Conference.

They finished the season 22–8, 11–7 in Big Ten play to finish in fifth place. They advanced to the quarterfinals of the Big Ten women's tournament where they lost to Indiana. They did not get a chance for further post season play, as the NCAA women's basketball tournament and WNIT were cancelled before they began due to the COVID-19 pandemic.

== Roster ==
2019–20 Rutgers Scarlet Knights women's basketball team
Players
Coaches

Pos.	#	Name	Height	Year	Previous school	Hometown
G	1	Zipporah Boughton	5 ft 7 in (1.7 m)	So	Robert E. Lee	Wetumpka, AL
G	5	Danielle Migliore	5 ft 7 in (1.7 m)	GS	Frankfort-Schuyler	Frankfort, NY
G	11	Stephanie Guihon	5 ft 6 in (1.68 m)	Jr	Largo	Largo, MD
G	12	Khadaizha Sanders	5 ft 7 in (1.7 m)	GS	Bishop McNamara	Virginia Beach, IL
F	13	Mael Gilles	6 ft 1 in (1.85 m)	Jr	Montmorency	Montréal-Nord, Quebec
C	15	Maori Davenport	6 ft 4 in (1.93 m)	Fr	Charles Henderson	Troy, AL
G	20	Joiya Maddox	5 ft 10 in (1.78 m)	Fr	Hoover	Hoover, AL
F	22	Tyia Singleton	6 ft 2 in (1.88 m)	RS Fr	Winter Haven	Winter Haven, FL
G	24	Arella Guirantes	5 ft 11 in (1.8 m)	RS Jr	Bellport; Texas Tech	Bellport, NY
G/F	31	Tekia Mack	6 ft 1 in (1.85 m)	Jr	Marshall	Chicago, IL
C	44	Jordan Wallace	6 ft 3 in (1.91 m)	Sr	Sterling	Somerdale, NJ

Head coach

- C. Vivian Stringer (Slippery Rock)

Assistant coach(es)

- Tim Eatman (Talladega)
- Nadine Domond (Iowa)
- Michelle Edwards (Iowa)

Legend

- (C) Team captain
- (S) Suspended
- (I) Ineligible
- (W) Walk-on
- Injured
- Current redshirt

Roster
Last update: May 6, 2020

== Schedule ==
Date time, TV	Rank^{#}	Opponent^{#}	Result	Record	Site (attendance) city, state
Non-conference regular season
November 5, 2019*; 8:00 p.m., ESPN+		at South Alabama	W 77–56	1–0	Mitchell Center (773); Mobile, AL
November 9, 2019*; 2:00 p.m., WCTC		Coppin State	W 107–33	2–0	Louis Brown Athletic Center (1,536); Piscataway, NJ
November 13, 2019*; 6:00 p.m., WCTC		Niagara	W 87–37	3–0	Louis Brown Athletic Center (6,017); Piscataway, NJ
November 17, 2019*; 2:00 p.m., WCTC		Harvard	W 74–46	4–0	Louis Brown Athletic Center (1,710); Piscataway, NJ
November 24, 2019*; 8:00 p.m., SECN		at LSU	L 58–64	4–1	Pete Maravich Assembly Center (1,309); Baton Rouge, LA
November 28, 2019*; 3:00 p.m., FloHoops		vs. Vanderbilt; Junkanoo Jam	W 62–56	5–1	Gateway Sporting Arena; Bimini, Bahamas
November 30, 2019*; 2:00 p.m., FloHoops		vs. Georgia Tech; Junkanoo Jam	W 46–43	6–1	Gateway Sporting Arena (150); Bimini, Bahamas
December 5, 2019*; 6:00 p.m., BTN		Virginia; ACC–Big Ten Women's Challenge	W 73–63	7–1	Louis Brown Athletic Center (1,597); Piscataway, NJ
December 8, 2019*; 2:00 p.m., WCTC		Towson	W 67–53	8–1	Louis Brown Athletic Center (1,292); Piscataway, NJ
December 12, 2019*; 7:00 p.m., WCTC		Southern	W 78–58	9–1	Louis Brown Athletic Center (1,095); Piscataway, NJ
December 15, 2019*; 2:00 p.m., WCTC		Marshall	W 66–41	10–1	Louis Brown Athletic Center (1,337); Piscataway, NJ
Big Ten Regular Season
December 28, 2019; 3:00 p.m., WCTC		at Wisconsin	W 64–61	11–1 (1–0)	Kohl Center (4,320); Madison, WI
December 31, 2019; 3:00 p.m., BTN		No. 14 Indiana	L 56–66	11–2 (1–1)	Louis Brown Athletic Center (2,324); Piscataway, NJ
January 5, 2020; 12:00 p.m., BTN		at Purdue	W 59–53	12–2 (2–1)	Mackey Arena (7,441); West Lafayette, IN
January 9, 2020; 8:00 p.m.		at Illinois	W 75–51	13–2 (3–1)	State Farm Center (997); Champaign, IL
January 12, 2020; 2:00 p.m., WCTC		Nebraska	W 69–65	14–2 (4–1)	Louis Brown Athletic Center (2,023); Piscataway, NJ
January 16, 2020; 7:00 p.m., WCTC		at Penn State	W 62–57	15–2 (5–1)	Bryce Jordan Center (1,685); University Park, PA
January 20, 2020; 6:00 p.m., BTN		Michigan State	L 55–66	15–3 (5–2)	Louis Brown Athletic Center (2,084); Piscataway, NJ
January 26, 2020; 2:00 p.m., WCTC		at Michigan	L 57–71	15–4 (5–3)	Crisler Center (3,676); Ann Arbor, MI
January 30, 2020; 7:00 p.m., WCTC		Illinois	W 72–41	16–4 (6–3)	Louis Brown Athletic Center (1,359); Piscataway, NJ
February 2, 2020; 3:00 p.m., ESPN2		at Minnesota	L 71–73 ^{2OT}	16–5 (6–4)	Williams Arena (4,319); Minneapolis, MN
February 6, 2020; 7:00 p.m., WCTC		Penn State	W 72–39	17–5 (7–4)	Louis Brown Athletic Center (1,658); Piscataway, NJ
February 9, 2020; 12:00 p.m., BTN		at No. 13 Maryland	L 50–79	17–6 (7–5)	Xfinity Center (9,239); College Park, MD
February 13, 2020; 7:00 p.m., WRSU		at Michigan State	L 53–57	17–7 (7–6)	Breslin Center (3,878); East Lansing, MI
February 16, 2020; 12:00 p.m., BTN		Michigan	W 62–41	18–7 (8–6)	Louis Brown Athletic Center (2,571); Piscataway, NJ
February 19, 2020; 8:00 p.m.		at No. 18 Northwestern	L 65–82	18–8 (8–7)	Welsh–Ryan Arena (1,142); Evanston, IL
February 22, 2020; 2:00 p.m., BTN		Ohio State	W 59–57	19–8 (9–7)	Louis Brown Athletic Center (2,281); Piscataway, NJ
February 27, 2020; 7:00 p.m., WCTC		Wisconsin	W 63–43	20–8 (10–7)	Louis Brown Athletic Center (1,471); Piscataway, NJ
March 1, 2020; 12:00 p.m., BTN		No. 18 Iowa	W 78–74 ^{OT}	21–8 (11–7)	Louis Brown Athletic Center (2,680); Piscataway, NJ
Big Ten Women's Tournament
March 5, 2020; 2:30 p.m., BTN	(5)	vs. (12) Wisconsin; Second Round	W 63–55	22–8	Bankers Life Fieldhouse (4,158); Indianapolis, IN
March 6, 2020; 2:30 p.m., BTN	(5)	vs. (4) No. 20 Indiana; Quarterfinals	L 60–78	22–9	Bankers Life Fieldhouse (5,711); Indianapolis, IN
*Non-conference game. ^{#}Rankings from AP Poll. (#) Tournament seedings in parentheses. All times are in Eastern Time.

== Rankings ==
Regular season polls
Poll	Pre- Season	Week 2	Week 3	Week 4	Week 5	Week 6	Week 7	Week 8	Week 9	Week 10	Week 11	Week 12	Week 13	Week 14	Week 15	Week 16	Week 17	Week 18	Week 19	Final
AP	RV	RV	RV		RV	RV	RV	RV	RV	RV	RV	RV	RV					RV	RV	RV
Coaches	RV	RV			RV		RV	RV	RV	RV	RV						RV	RV		N/A

Legend
	Increase in ranking
	Decrease in ranking
	Not ranked previous week
(RV)	Received Votes

== See also ==
2019–20 Rutgers Scarlet Knights men's basketball team
