= 2019–20 Maryland Terrapins women's basketball team =

Intercollegiate basketball season

2019–20 Maryland Terrapins women's basketball
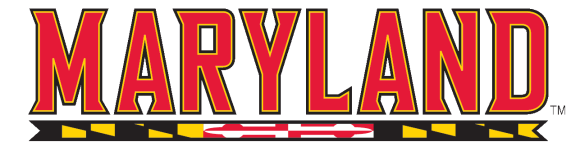

Big Ten regular season co-champions and Tournament champions
- Conference: Big Ten Conference

Ranking
- Coaches: No. 10
- AP: No. 4
- Record: 28–4 (16–2 Big Ten)
- Head coach: Brenda Frese (18th season)
- Assistant coaches: Shay Robinson; Karen Blair; Kaitlynn Fratz
- Home arena: Xfinity Center

2019–20 Big Ten women's basketball standings
	Conf.				Overall
Team	W		L	PCT	W		L	PCT
No. 4 Maryland†	16	–	2	.889	28	–	4	.875
No. 12 Northwestern	16	–	2	.889	26	–	4	.867
No. 21 Iowa	14	–	4	.778	23	–	7	.767
No. 20 Indiana	13	–	5	.722	24	–	8	.750
Rutgers	11	–	7	.611	22	–	9	.710
Ohio State	11	–	7	.611	21	–	12	.636
Michigan	10	–	8	.556	21	–	11	.656
Michigan State	9	–	9	.500	16	–	14	.533
Purdue	8	–	10	.444	18	–	14	.563
Nebraska	7	–	11	.389	17	–	13	.567
Minnesota	5	–	13	.278	16	–	15	.516
Wisconsin	3	–	15	.167	12	–	19	.387
Illinois	2	–	16	.111	11	–	19	.367
Penn State	1	–	17	.056	7	–	23	.233
† 2020 Big Ten tournament winner Rankings from AP poll

The 2019–20 Maryland Terrapins women's basketball team represent the University of Maryland, College Park in 2019–20 NCAA Division I women's basketball season. The Terrapins, led by eighteenth year head coach Brenda Frese, played their home games at the Xfinity Center as members of the Big Ten Conference.

== Roster ==
2019–20 Maryland Terrapins women's basketball team
Players
Coaches

Pos.	#	Name	Height	Year	Previous school	Hometown
C	00	Olivia Owens	6 ft 4 in (1.93 m)	So	Niskayuna	Niskayuna, NY
F	1	Shakira Austin	6 ft 5 in (1.96 m)	So	Riverdale Baptist	Fredericksburg, VA
G	2	Zoe Young	5 ft 10 in (1.78 m)	Fr	West Des Moines Valley	Des Moines, IA
G	3	Channise Lewis	5 ft 8 in (1.73 m)	Jr	Miami Country Day	Miami, FL
G	5	Kaila Charles	6 ft 1 in (1.85 m)	Sr	Riverdale Baptist	Glenn Dale, MD
G	11	Taylor Mikesell	5 ft 11 in (1.8 m)	So	Jackson	Massillon, OH
F	12	Mimi Collins	6 ft 3 in (1.91 m)	So	Paul VI Catholic HS; Tennessee	Waldorf, MD
F	13	Faith Masonius	6 ft 1 in (1.85 m)	Fr	Manasquan	Spring Lake, NJ
G	14	Diamond Miller	6 ft 3 in (1.91 m)	Fr	Franklin	Somerset, NJ
G	15	Ashley Owusu	6 ft 0 in (1.83 m)	Fr	Paul VI Catholic HS	Woodbridge, VA
G	22	Blair Watson	6 ft 0 in (1.83 m)	Sr	Nutley	Nutley, NJ
F	24	Stephanie Jones	6 ft 2 in (1.88 m)	Sr	Aberdeen	Havre de Grace, MD
G	32	Sara Vujačić	5 ft 11 in (1.8 m)	Sr	Walters State CC	Maribor, Slovenia

Head coach

- Brenda Frese (Arizona)

Assistant coach(es)

- Shay Robinson (Central Florida)
- Karen Blair (SMU)
- Kaitlynn Fratz (California (PA))

Legend

- (C) Team captain
- (S) Suspended
- (I) Ineligible
- (W) Walk-on
- Injured
- Current redshirt

Roster
Last update: October 30, 2019

=== Recruits ===
College recruiting information
Name	Hometown	School	Height	Weight	Commit date
Faith Masonius; W	Spring Lake, New Jersey	Manasquan High School	6 ft 0 in (1.83 m)	N/A	Jan 22, 2018
Faith Masonius; W	Recruit ratings: ESPN: (96)				
Diamond Miller; G	Somerset, New Jersey	Franklin High School	6 ft 1 in (1.85 m)	N/A	Mar 10, 2018
Diamond Miller; G	Recruit ratings: ESPN: (98)				
Ashley Owusu; PG	Woodbridge, Virginia	Paul VI High School	5 ft 9 in (1.75 m)	N/A	Aug 10, 2017
Ashley Owusu; PG	Recruit ratings: ESPN: (98)				
Zoe Young; G	Urbandale, Iowa	Valley High School	5 ft 10 in (1.78 m)	N/A	Aug 14, 2017
Zoe Young; G	Recruit ratings: ESPN: (97)				
Overall recruit ranking: ESPN: 3
Note: In many cases, Scout, Rivals, 247Sports, On3, and ESPN may conflict in their listings of height and weight.; In these cases, the average was taken. ESPN grades are on a 100-point scale.; Sources:

== Schedule and results ==
Date time, TV	Rank^{#}	Opponent^{#}	Result	Record	Site (attendance) city, state
Exhibition
10/25/2019*; 6:00 pm	No. 4	Cal U	W 109–67		Xfinity Center; College Park, MD
10/29/2019*; 6:00 pm	No. 4	Lincoln	W 115–52		Xfinity Center; College Park, MD
Non-conference regular season
11/05/2019*; 11:00 am, BTN Plus	No. 4	Wagner	W 119–56	1–0	Xfinity Center (8,368); College Park, MD
11/10/2019*; 3:00 pm, ESPN	No. 4	No. 8 South Carolina	L 54–63	1–1	Xfinity Center (7,447); College Park, MD
11/13/2019*; 7:00 pm, FloSports	No. 8	at James Madison	W 70–68	2–1	JMU Convocation Center (2,628); Harrisonburg, VA
11/17/2019*; 1:00 pm, BTN Plus	No. 8	Delaware	W 99–55	3–1	Xfinity Center (4,435); College Park, MD
11/20/2019*; 7:00 pm, BTN Plus	No. 9	George Washington	W 88–54	4–1	Xfinity Center (3,614); College Park, MD
11/24/2019*; 12:00 pm, BTN Plus	No. 9	Quinnipiac	W 107–52	5–1	Xfinity Center (4,445); College Park, MD
11/29/2019*; 5:45 pm	No. 9	vs. Clemson; Daytona Beach Invitational	W 63–44	6–1	Ocean Center (312); Daytona Beach, FL
11/30/2019*; 3:30 pm	No. 9	vs. Belmont; Daytona Beach Invitational	W 90–26	7–1	Ocean Center (133); Daytona Beach, FL
12/05/2019*; 7:00 pm, ESPN	No. 9	at No. 13 NC State; ACC–Big Ten Women's Challenge	L 59–66	7–2	Reynolds Coliseum (4,033); Raleigh, NC
12/8/2019*; 1:00 pm, BTN Plus	No. 9	Loyola (MD)	W 105–45	8–2	Xfinity Center (4,148); College Park, MD
12/18/2019*; 11:00 am	No. 13	at Georgia State	W 114–41	9–2	GSU Sports Arena (1,501); Atlanta, GA
Big Ten regular season
12/28/2019; 8:00 pm, BTN	No. 12	No. 23 Michigan	W 70–55	10–2 (1–0)	Xfinity Center (6,203); College Park, MD
12/31/2019; 5:00 pm, BTN	No. 12	at Northwestern	L 58–81	10–3 (1–1)	Welsh–Ryan Arena (1,003); Evanston, IL
01/06/2020; 7:00 pm, ESPN2	No. 17	Ohio State	W 72–62	11–3 (2–1)	Xfinity Center (4,427); College Park, MD
01/09/2020; 8:00 pm, BTN	No. 17	at Iowa	L 61–66	11–4 (2–2)	Carver–Hawkeye Arena (6,689); Iowa City, IA
01/12/2020; 12:00 pm, ESPN2	No. 17	at No. 24 Michigan	W 77–49	12–4 (3–2)	Crisler Center (2,608); Ann Arbor, MI
01/16/2020; 8:00 pm, BTN	No. 20	Nebraska	W 87–69	13–4 (4–2)	Xfinity Center (3,839); College Park, MD
01/20/2020; 8:00 pm, BTN	No. 20	No. 17 Indiana	W 76–62	14–4 (5–2)	Xfinity Center (4,583); College Park, MD
01/23/2020; 8:00 pm, BTN Plus	No. 20	at Illinois	W 79–60	15–4 (6–2)	State Farm Center (1,088); Champaign, IL
01/26/2020; 1:00 pm, BTN Plus	No. 20	No. 22 Northwestern	W 70–61	16–4 (7–2)	Xfinity Center (8,276); College Park, MD
01/30/2020; 6:30 pm, BTN	No. 17	at Ohio State	W 85–65	17–4 (8–2)	Value City Arena (5,380); Columbus, OH
02/03/2020; 8:00 pm, BTN	No. 13	Michigan State	W 66–54	18–4 (9–2)	Xfinity Center (4,798); College Park, MD
02/06/2020; 8:00 pm, BTN	No. 13	at No. 18 Indiana	W 79–69	19–4 (10–2)	Simon Skjodt Assembly Hall (3,274); Bloomington, IN
02/09/2020; 12:00 pm, BTN	No. 13	Rutgers	W 79–50	20–4 (11–2)	Xfinity Center (9,239); College Park, MD
02/13/2020; 6:00 pm, BTN	No. 10	No. 17 Iowa	W 93–59	21–4 (12–2)	Xfinity Center (5,446); College Park, MD
02/16/2020; 2:00 pm, BTN Plus	No. 10	at Penn State	W 106–69	22–4 (13–2)	Bryce Jordan Center (2,835); University Park, PA
02/19/2020; 8:00 pm, BTN Plus	No. 7	at Wisconsin	W 85–56	23–4 (14–2)	Kohl Center (3,878); Madison, WI
02/25/2020; 8:00 pm, BTN	No. 7	Purdue	W 88–45	24–4 (15–2)	Xfinity Center (5,105); College Park, MD
03/01/2020; 4:00 pm, ESPN2	No. 7	at Minnesota	W 99–44	25–4 (16–2)	Williams Arena (6,013); Minneapolis, MN
Big Ten Women's Tournament
03/06/2020; 12:00 pm, BTN	(1) No. 6	vs. (9) Purdue; Quarterfinals	W 74–62	26–4	Bankers Life Fieldhouse; Indianapolis, IN
03/07/2020; 6:30 pm, BTN	(1) No. 6	vs. (4) No. 20 Indiana; Semifinals	W 67–59	27–4	Bankers Life Fieldhouse; Indianapolis, IN
03/08/2020; 6:00 pm, ESPN2	(1) No. 6	vs. (6) Ohio State; Championship	W 82–65	28–4	Bankers Life Fieldhouse (4,687); Indianapolis, IN
*Non-conference game. ^{#}Rankings from AP Poll. (#) Tournament seedings in parentheses. All times are in Eastern Time.

== Rankings ==
2019–20 NCAA Division I women's basketball rankings

Regular season polls
Poll	Pre- Season	Week 2	Week 3	Week 4	Week 5	Week 6	Week 7	Week 8	Week 9	Week 10	Week 11	Week 12	Week 13	Week 14	Week 15	Week 16	Week 17	Week 18	Week 19	Final
AP	4	8	9	9	9	13												6	4	N/A
Coaches	5		10	10	9	12														

Legend
	Increase in ranking
	Decrease in ranking
	Not ranked previous week
(RV)	Received Votes
(NR)	Not Ranked

== See also ==
2019–20 Maryland Terrapins men's basketball team
