= 2019–20 Indiana Hoosiers women's basketball team =

Intercollegiate basketball season

2019–20 Indiana Hoosiers women's basketball
- Conference: Big Ten Conference

Ranking
- Coaches: No. 23
- AP: No. 20
- Record: 24–8 (13–5 Big Ten)
- Head coach: Teri Moren (6th season)
- Assistant coaches: Rhet Wierzba; Janese Banks; Glenn Box
- Home arena: Simon Skjodt Assembly Hall

2019–20 Big Ten women's basketball standings
	Conf.				Overall
Team	W		L	PCT	W		L	PCT
No. 4 Maryland†	16	–	2	.889	28	–	4	.875
No. 12 Northwestern	16	–	2	.889	26	–	4	.867
No. 21 Iowa	14	–	4	.778	23	–	7	.767
No. 20 Indiana	13	–	5	.722	24	–	8	.750
Rutgers	11	–	7	.611	22	–	9	.710
Ohio State	11	–	7	.611	21	–	12	.636
Michigan	10	–	8	.556	21	–	11	.656
Michigan State	9	–	9	.500	16	–	14	.533
Purdue	8	–	10	.444	18	–	14	.563
Nebraska	7	–	11	.389	17	–	13	.567
Minnesota	5	–	13	.278	16	–	15	.516
Wisconsin	3	–	15	.167	12	–	19	.387
Illinois	2	–	16	.111	11	–	19	.367
Penn State	1	–	17	.056	7	–	23	.233
† 2020 Big Ten tournament winner Rankings from AP poll

The 2019–20 Indiana Hoosiers women's basketball team represented Indiana University Bloomington during the 2019–20 NCAA Division I women's basketball season. The Hoosiers were led by sixth-year head coach Teri Moren and played their home games at Simon Skjodt Assembly Hall as a member of the Big Ten Conference.

== Roster ==
2019–20 Indiana Hoosiers women's basketball team
Players
Coaches

Pos.	#	Name	Height	Year	Previous school	Hometown
G	0	Danielle Patterson	6 ft 2 in (1.88 m)	Jr	The Mary Louis Academy; Notre Dame	Brooklyn, NY
G	1	Bendu Yeaney	5 ft 10 in (1.78 m)	Jr	St. Mary's Academy	Portland, OR
G	2	Keyanna Warthen	5 ft 10 in (1.78 m)	Jr	Fort Lauderdale	Fort Lauderdale, FL
G	3	Grace Waggoner	6 ft 0 in (1.83 m)	Fr	Rivet	Vincennes, IN
G	5	Shaila Beeler	5 ft 7 in (1.7 m)	Fr	Warren Central	Indianapolis, IN
F	10	Aleksa Gulbe	6 ft 3 in (1.91 m)	So	TTT Riga	Riga, Latvia
G	11	Chanel Wilson	5 ft 6 in (1.68 m)	RS Fr	McEachern	Powder Springs, GA
G	13	Jaelynn Penn	5 ft 10 in (1.78 m)	Jr	Butler	Louisville, KY
G	14	Ali Patberg	5 ft 11 in (1.8 m)	RS Sr	Columbus North; Notre Dame	Columbus, IN
C	25	Arielle Wisne	6 ft 5 in (1.96 m)	Fr	Thornton	Thornton, CO
F	33	Jorie Allen	6 ft 1 in (1.85 m)	Fr	Bedford North Lawrence	Bedford, IN
G	34	Grace Berger	6 ft 0 in (1.83 m)	So	Sacred Heart	Louisville, KY
F	50	Brenna Wise	6 ft 0 in (1.83 m)	Sr	Vincentian Academy; Pittsburgh	Pittsburgh, PA
C	51	Hannah Noveroske	6 ft 5 in (1.96 m)	Fr	Michigan City	Michigan City, IN
F	54	Mackenzie Holmes	6 ft 3 in (1.91 m)	Fr	Gorham	Gorham, ME

Head coach

- Teri Moren (Purdue)

Assistant coach(es)

- Rhet Wierzba (Austin Peay)
- Janese Constantine (Wisconsin)
- Glenn Box (Southeast Missouri State)

Legend

- (C) Team captain
- (S) Suspended
- (I) Ineligible
- (W) Walk-on
- Injured
- Current redshirt

Roster

== Schedule ==
Date time, TV	Rank^{#}	Opponent^{#}	Result	Record	Site (attendance) city, state
Exhibition
11/03/2019*; 2:00 pm	No. 24	McKendree	W 109–43		Simon Skjodt Assembly Hall; Bloomington, IN
Non-conference regular season
11/07/2019*; 7:00 pm, BTN Plus	No. 24	Mount St. Mary's	W 75–52	1–0	Simon Skjodt Assembly Hall (2,831); Bloomington, IN
11/10/2019*; 12:00 pm, BTN Plus	No. 24	Nicholls State	W 111–47	2–0	Simon Skjodt Assembly Hall (3,337); Bloomington, IN
11/17/2019*; 2:00 pm, BTN Plus	No. 21	Jackson State	W 91–51	3–0	Simon Skjodt Assembly Hall (3,557); Bloomington, IN
11/22/2019*; 6:00 pm, SECN+	No. 18	at Florida	W 73–49	4–0	O'Connell Center (1,224); Gainesville, FL
11/28/2019*; 8:00 pm, FloHoops	No. 17	vs. No. 5 South Carolina; Paradise Jam	W 71–57	5–0	Sports and Fitness Center (1,927); Saint Thomas, USVI
11/29/2019*; 5:45 pm, FloHoops	No. 17	vs. No. 2 Baylor; Paradise Jam	L 62–77	5–1	Sports and Fitness Center; Saint Thomas, USVI
11/30/2019*; 5:45 pm, FloHoops	No. 17	vs. Washington State; Paradise Jam	W 78–44	6–1	Sports and Fitness Center; Saint Thomas, USVI
12/04/2019*; 6:00 pm, ACCN	No. 14	at No. 21 Miami; ACC–Big Ten Women's Challenge	W 58–45	7–1	Watsco Center (848); Coral Gables, FL
12/07/2019*; 7:00 pm, BTN Plus	No. 14	North Florida	W 72–45	8–1	Simon Skjodt Assembly Hall (3,754); Bloomington, IN
12/11/2019*; 7:00 pm	No. 12	at Butler	W 64–53	9–1	Hinkle Fieldhouse (2,028); Indianapolis, IN
12/15/2019*; 2:00 pm, BTN Plus	No. 12	Youngstown State	W 93–56	10–1	Simon Skjodt Assembly Hall (3,573); Bloomington, IN
12/22/2019*; 12:00 pm, BTN	No. 12	No. 10 UCLA	L 58–68	10–2	Simon Skjodt Assembly Hall (5,272); Bloomington, IN
Big Ten regular season
12/28/2019; 6:00 pm, BTN	No. 14	Michigan State	W 79–67	11–2 (1–0)	Simon Skjodt Assembly Hall (6,020); Bloomington, IN
12/31/2019; 3:00 pm, BTN	No. 14	at Rutgers	W 66–56	12–2 (2–0)	Louis Brown Athletic Center (2,324); Piscataway, NJ
01/06/2020; 7:00 pm, BTN	No. 12	Illinois	W 83–42	13–2 (3–0)	Simon Skjodt Assembly Hall (3,024); Bloomington, IN
01/09/2020; 7:00 pm, BTN Plus	No. 12	Purdue; Rivalry/Crimson and Gold Cup	W 66–48	14–2 (4–0)	Simon Skjodt Assembly Hall (5,159); Bloomington, IN
01/12/2020; 3:00 pm, BTN	No. 12	at Iowa	L 85–91 ^{2OT}	14–3 (4–1)	Carver–Hawkeye Arena (7,397); Iowa City, IA
01/16/2020; 7:00 pm, BTN Plus	No. 15	Northwestern	L 69–71	14–4 (4–2)	Simon Skjodt Assembly Hall (3,805); Bloomington, IN
01/20/2020; 8:00 pm, BTN	No. 17	at No. 20 Maryland	L 62–76	14–5 (4–3)	Xfinity Center (4,583); College Park, MD
01/23/2020; 6:00 pm, BTN	No. 17	at Penn State	W 76–60	15–5 (5–3)	Bryce Jordan Center (1,634); University Park
01/27/2020; 6:00 pm, BTN	No. 20	Minnesota	W 65–52	16–5 (6–3)	Simon Sjodt Assembly Hall (3,463); Bloomington, IN
01/30/2020; 7:00 pm, BTN Plus	No. 20	Wisconsin	W 75–65 ^{OT}	17–5 (7–3)	Simon Sjodt Assembly Hall (3,576); Bloomington, IN
02/03/2020; 6:00 pm, BTN	No. 18	at Purdue; Rivalry/Crimson and Gold Cup	W 66–54	18–5 (8–3)	Mackey Arena (8,161); West Lafayette, IN
02/06/2020; 8:00 pm, BTN	No. 18	No. 13 Maryland	L 69–79	18–6 (8–4)	Simon Sjodt Assembly Hall (3,274); Bloomington, IN
02/09/2020; 3:00 pm, BTN Plus	No. 18	at Nebraska	W 57–53	19–6 (9–4)	Pinnacle Bank Arena (6,160); Lincoln, NE
02/13/2020; 8:00 pm, BTN Plus	No. 20	at Illinois	W 59–54	20–6 (10–4)	State Farm Center (1,145); Champaign, IL
02/16/2020; 2:00 pm, BTN Plus	No. 20	Ohio State	L 76–80	20–7 (10–5)	Simon Sjodt Assembly Hall (6,142); Bloomington, IN
02/22/2020; 6:00 pm	No. 24	at Minnesota	W 75–69	21–7 (11–5)	Williams Arena (4,453); Minneapolis, MN
02/27/2020; 6:00 pm	No. 22	Nebraska	W 81–53	22–7 (12–5)	Simon Skjodt Assembly Hall (3,583); Bloomington, IN
03/01/2020; 12:00 pm	No. 22	at Michigan	W 78–60	23–7 (13–5)	Crisler Center (3,719); Ann Arbor, MI
Big Ten Women's Tournament
03/06/2020; 2:30 pm, BTN	(4) No. 20	vs. (5) Rutgers; Quarterfinals	W 78–60	24–7	Bankers Life Fieldhouse; Indianapolis, IN
03/07/2020; 6:30 pm, BTN	(4) No. 20	vs. (1) No. 6 Maryland; Semifinals	L 51–66	24–8	Bankers Life Fieldhouse; Indianapolis, IN
*Non-conference game. ^{#}Rankings from AP Poll. (#) Tournament seedings in parentheses. All times are in Eastern Time.

== Rankings ==
Ranking movement Legend: ██ Increase in ranking. ██ Decrease in ranking. NR = Not ranked. RV = Received votes.
Poll	Pre	Wk 2	Wk 3	Wk 4	Wk 5	Wk 6	Wk 7	Wk 8	Wk 9	Wk 10	Wk 11	Wk 12	Wk 13	Wk 14	Wk 15	Wk 16	Wk 17	Wk 18	Wk 19	Final
AP	24	21	18	17	14	12	12	14	14	12									20	
Coaches	RV	RV	25	23	16	15	14	15	15											

== See also ==
- 2019–20 Indiana Hoosiers men's basketball team
