= 2019–20 Illinois Fighting Illini women's basketball team =

Intercollegiate basketball season

2019–20 Illinois Fighting Illini women's basketball
- Conference: Big Ten Conference
- Record: 11–19 (2–16 Big Ten)
- Head coach: Nancy Fahey (3rd season)
- Assistant coaches: John Patterson; Scott Merritt; Vernette Skeete
- Home arena: State Farm Center

2019–20 Big Ten women's basketball standings
	Conf.				Overall
Team	W		L	PCT	W		L	PCT
No. 4 Maryland†	16	–	2	.889	28	–	4	.875
No. 12 Northwestern	16	–	2	.889	26	–	4	.867
No. 21 Iowa	14	–	4	.778	23	–	7	.767
No. 20 Indiana	13	–	5	.722	24	–	8	.750
Rutgers	11	–	7	.611	22	–	9	.710
Ohio State	11	–	7	.611	21	–	12	.636
Michigan	10	–	8	.556	21	–	11	.656
Michigan State	9	–	9	.500	16	–	14	.533
Purdue	8	–	10	.444	18	–	14	.563
Nebraska	7	–	11	.389	17	–	13	.567
Minnesota	5	–	13	.278	16	–	15	.516
Wisconsin	3	–	15	.167	12	–	19	.387
Illinois	2	–	16	.111	11	–	19	.367
Penn State	1	–	17	.056	7	–	23	.233
† 2020 Big Ten tournament winner Rankings from AP poll

The 2019–20 Illinois Fighting Illini women's basketball team represented the University of Illinois during the 2019–20 NCAA Division I women's basketball season. The Fighting Illini, led by third-year head coach Nancy Fahey, played their home games at State Farm Center in Champaign, Illinois as members of the Big Ten Conference. They finished the season 11–19, 2–16 in Big Ten play, to finish in thirteenth place. They lost in the first round of the Big Ten tournament to Wisconsin.

== Previous season ==
The Fighting Illini finished the 2018–19 season 10–20, 2–16 in Big Ten play, to finish in last place. They lost in the first round of the Big Ten tournament to Purdue.

== Roster ==
2019–20 Illinois Fighting Illini women's basketball team
Players
Coaches

Pos.	#	Name	Height	Year	Previous school	Hometown
G	0	J-Naya Ephraim	5 ft 9 in (1.75 m)	So	Southern Durham	Saint Croix, USVI
G	1	Brandi Beasley	5 ft 6 in (1.68 m)	Sr	Ridgeway	Memphis, TN
F	2	Lyric Robins	5 ft 11 in (1.8 m)	Jr	Plano West	Plano, TX
G	4	Carolyn Waleski	5 ft 10 in (1.78 m)	So	Lincoln-Way East	Frankfort, IL
G	5	Cierra Rice	5 ft 9 in (1.75 m)	RS Sr	Grosse Pointe South	Grosse Pointe, MI
G	10	Jeanae Terry	5 ft 11 in (1.8 m)	Fr	Wayne Memorial	Detroit, MI
G	11	Jada Peebles	5 ft 10 in (1.78 m)	Fr	Wakefield	Raleigh, NC
G	12	Taylor Edwards	5 ft 7 in (1.7 m)	GS	Arcola	Arcola, IL
G	13	Petra Holešínská	5 ft 10 in (1.78 m)	RS Jr	Sportovni Gzmnazium Ludvika Danka	Vracov, Czech Republic
F	21	Nancy Panagiotopoulou Andritsopoulou	6 ft 3 in (1.91 m)	RS So	American Community Schools of Athens	Athens, Greece
F	23	Mackenzie Blazek	6 ft 3 in (1.91 m)	So	Whiteland Community	Franklin, IN
G	30	Courtney Joens	5 ft 10 in (1.78 m)	Sr	City High	Iowa City, IA
F	44	Kennedi Myles	6 ft 2 in (1.88 m)	Fr	Walnut Hills	Cincinnati, OH
F	50	Ali Andrews	6 ft 2 in (1.88 m)	Sr	Huntley	Lake in the Hills, IL

Head coach

- Nancy Fahey (Wisconsin)

Assistant coach(es)

- John Patterson (Fontbonne)
- Scott Merritt (Marquette)
- Vernette Skeete (Alcorn State)

Legend

- (C) Team captain
- (S) Suspended
- (I) Ineligible
- (W) Walk-on
- Injured
- Current redshirt

Roster
Last update: May 13, 2020

== Schedule and results ==
Date time, TV	Rank^{#}	Opponent^{#}	Result	Record	Site (attendance) city, state
Non-conference regular season
November 5, 2019*; 11:00 a.m., BTN+		Chicago State	W 96–66	1–0	State Farm Center (4,189); Champaign, IL
November 9, 2019*; 2:00 p.m., BTN+		Holy Cross	W 78–75 ^{OT}	2–0	State Farm Center (1,240); Champaign, IL
November 13, 2019*; 7:00 p.m., BTN+		Austin Peay	W 76–62	3–0	State Farm Center (1,010); Champaign, IL
November 16, 2019*; 2:00 p.m., BTN+		Illinois State	L 58–74	3–1	State Farm Center (1,520); Champaign, IL
November 21, 2019*; 7:00 p.m., BTN+		Arkansas–Pine Bluff	W 65–50	4–1	State Farm Center (1,045); Champaign, IL
November 24, 2019*; 2:00 p.m., BTN+		Bryant	W 69–55	5–1	State Farm Center (1,199); Champaign, IL
November 30, 2019*; 7:00 p.m., BTN+		Presbyterian	W 71–52	6–1	State Farm Center (1,058); Champaign, IL
December 5, 2019*; 5:00 p.m., ACCN		at North Carolina; ACC–Big Ten Women's Challenge	L 60–85	6–2	Carmichael Arena (2,116); Chapel Hill, NC
December 10, 2019*; 7:00 p.m., BTN+		Merrimack	W 75–72	7–2	State Farm Center (960); Champaign, IL
December 15, 2019*; 2:00 p.m., BTN+		Evansville	W 59–44	8–2	State Farm Center (1,383); Champaign, IL
December 20, 2019*; 12:00 p.m., SECN		at Missouri	W 58–51	9–2	Mizzou Arena (4,332); Columbia, MO
Big Ten conference season
December 28, 2019; 2:00 p.m., BTN+		Northwestern	L 50–77	9–3 (0–1)	State Farm Center (2,099); Champaign, IL
December 31, 2019; 3:00 p.m., BTN+		at Iowa	L 72–108	9–4 (0–1)	Carver–Hawkeye Arena (6,942); Iowa City, IA
January 6, 2020; 6:00 p.m., BTN		at No. 12 Indiana	L 42–83	9–5 (0–3)	Simon Skjodt Assembly Hall (3,024); Bloomington, IN
January 9, 2020; 7:00 p.m., BTN+		Rutgers	L 51–75	9–6 (0–4)	State Farm Center (997); Champaign, IL
January 12, 2020; 2:00 p.m., BTN		Minnesota	W 74–71	10–6 (1–4)	State Farm Center (1,333); Champaign, IL
January 16, 2020; 6:00 p.m., BTN+		at Purdue	L 67–81	10–7 (1–5)	Mackey Arena (5,886); West Lafayette, IN
January 19, 2020; 1:00 p.m., BTN+		at Ohio State	L 47–77	10–8 (1–6)	Value City Arena (5,143); Columbus, OH
January 23, 2020; 7:00 p.m., BTN+		No. 20 Maryland	L 60–79	10–9 (1–7)	State Farm Center (1,088); Champaign, IL
January 30, 2020; 6:00 p.m., BTN+		at Rutgers	L 41–72	10–10 (1–8)	Louis Brown Athletic Center (1,359); Piscataway, NJ
February 2, 2020; 2:00 p.m., BTN+		Wisconsin	L 64–73	10–11 (1–9)	State Farm Center (2,388); Champaign, IL
February 6, 2020; 7:00 p.m., BTN+		Ohio State	L 58–78	10–12 (1–10)	State Farm Center (2,388); Champaign, IL
February 9, 2020; 1:00 p.m., BTN+		at Penn State	W 70–66	11–12 (2–10)	Bryce Jordan Center (4,592); University Park, PA
February 13, 2020; 7:00 p.m., BTN+		No. 20 Indiana	L 54–59	11–13 (2–11)	State Farm Center (1,145); Champaign, IL
February 16, 2020; 2:00 p.m., BTN+		Purdue	L 58–70	11–14 (2–12)	State Farm Center (2,119); Champaign, IL
February 19, 2020; 6:00 p.m., BTN+		at Michigan	L 59–80	11–15 (2–13)	Crisler Center (2,388); Ann Arbor, MI
February 22, 2020; 2:00 p.m., BTN+		at Nebraska	L 58–80	11–16 (2–14)	Pinnacle Bank Arena (5,044); Lincoln, NE
February 26, 2020; 7:00 p.m., BTN+		Michigan State	L 58–72	11–17 (2–15)	State Farm Center (1,176); Champaign, IL
February 29, 2020; 1:00 p.m., BTN		at No. 14 Northwestern	L 58–75	11–18 (2–16)	Welsh–Ryan Arena (4,016); Evanston, IL
Big Ten women's tournament
March 4, 2020; 1:00 p.m., BTN	(13)	vs. (12) Wisconsin; First round	L 55–71	11–19	Bankers Life Fieldhouse (3,793); Indianapolis, IN
*Non-conference game. ^{#}Rankings from AP poll. (#) Tournament seedings in parentheses. All times are in Central.

== Rankings ==
Regular-season polls
Poll	Pre- season	Week 2	Week 3	Week 4	Week 5	Week 6	Week 7	Week 8	Week 9	Week 10	Week 11	Week 12	Week 13	Week 14	Week 15	Week 16	Week 17	Week 18	Week 19	Final
AP																				N/A
Coaches																				

Legend
	Increase in ranking
	Decrease in ranking
	Not ranked previous week
(RV)	Received votes

== See also ==
- 2019–20 Illinois Fighting Illini men's basketball team
