= 2019–20 Ohio State Buckeyes women's basketball team =

Intercollegiate basketball season

2019–20 Ohio State Buckeyes women's basketball
- Conference: Big Ten Conference
- Record: 21–12 (11–7 Big Ten)
- Head coach: Kevin McGuff (7th season)
- Assistant coaches: Tamika Jeter; Carla Morrow
- Home arena: Value City Arena

2019–20 Big Ten women's basketball standings
	Conf.				Overall
Team	W		L	PCT	W		L	PCT
No. 4 Maryland†	16	–	2	.889	28	–	4	.875
No. 12 Northwestern	16	–	2	.889	26	–	4	.867
No. 21 Iowa	14	–	4	.778	23	–	7	.767
No. 20 Indiana	13	–	5	.722	24	–	8	.750
Rutgers	11	–	7	.611	22	–	9	.710
Ohio State	11	–	7	.611	21	–	12	.636
Michigan	10	–	8	.556	21	–	11	.656
Michigan State	9	–	9	.500	16	–	14	.533
Purdue	8	–	10	.444	18	–	14	.563
Nebraska	7	–	11	.389	17	–	13	.567
Minnesota	5	–	13	.278	16	–	15	.516
Wisconsin	3	–	15	.167	12	–	19	.387
Illinois	2	–	16	.111	11	–	19	.367
Penn State	1	–	17	.056	7	–	23	.233
† 2020 Big Ten tournament winner Rankings from AP poll

The 2019–20 Ohio State Buckeyes women's basketball team represented the Ohio State University during the 2019–20 NCAA Division I women's basketball season. The Buckeyes, led by 7th-year head coach Kevin McGuff, played their home games at Value City Arena and were members of the Big Ten Conference.

They finished the season 21–12, 11–7 in Big Ten play to finish in a tie for fifth place. As the sixth seed in the Big Ten women's basketball tournament, they defeated Minnesota, Iowa, and Michigan before losing to Maryland in the finals. They did not get a chance for further post-season play, as the NCAA women's basketball tournament and WNIT were cancelled before they began, due to the COVID-19 pandemic.

== Previous season ==
The Buckeyes finished the season 14–15, 10–8 in Big Ten play to finish in fifth place. They lost in the second round of the Big Ten women's basketball tournament to Wisconsin. They received an automatic bid to the WNIT, where they were upset by Morehead State in the first round.

== Roster ==
2019–20 Ohio State Buckeyes women's basketball team
Players
Coaches

Pos.	#	Name	Height	Year	Previous school	Hometown
G	0	Madison Greene	5 ft 8 in (1.73 m)	Fr	Pickerington Central	Pickerington, OH
G	1	Rikki Harris	5 ft 10 in (1.78 m)	Fr	North Central	Indianapolis, IN
G	2	Ashanti Grande	5 ft 9 in (1.75 m)	RS Sr	Cleveland Heights; Cleveland State	Cleveland Heights, OH
G	4	Jacy Sheldon	5 ft 10 in (1.78 m)	Fr	Dublin Coffman	Dublin, OH
G	10	Braxtin Miller	5 ft 11 in (1.8 m)	Jr	Alter; Oklahoma State	Dayton, OH
F	11	Aixa Wone Aranaz	6 ft 3 in (1.91 m)	Fr	I.E.S. Joaquim Blume	Pamplona, Spain
F	12	Savita Jayaraman	6 ft 2 in (1.88 m)	Sr	Olentangy Liberty	Powell, OH
F	14	Dorka Juhász	6 ft 4 in (1.93 m)	So	PTE Babits	Pécs, Hungary
F	23	Rebeka Mikulášiková	6 ft 4 in (1.93 m)	Fr	Piaristické Gymnasium	Nitra, Slovakia
G	24	Kierstan Bell	6 ft 1 in (1.85 m)	Fr	Canton McKinley	Canton, OH
F	32	Aaliyah Patty	6 ft 3 in (1.91 m)	So	Montini Catholic	Lombard, IL

Head coach

- Kevin McGuff (Saint Joseph's (IN))

Assistant coach(es)

- Tamika Jeter (Connecticut)
- Carla Morrow (Tulsa)

Legend

- (C) Team captain
- (S) Suspended
- (I) Ineligible
- (W) Walk-on
- Injured
- Current redshirt

Roster
Last update: May 7, 2020

== Schedule and results ==
Date time, TV	Rank^{#}	Opponent^{#}	Result	Record	Site (attendance) city, state
Exhibition
November 3, 2019*; 2:00 p.m.		Urbana	W 131–50	–	Value City Arena (3,476); Columbus, OH
Non-conference regular season
November 10, 2019*; 2:00 p.m.		at Valparaiso; Ohio Hall of Fame Tip Off Classic	W 89–38	1–0	Pam Evans Smith Arena (1,875); Springfield, OH
November 13, 2019* p.m.		at Cincinnati	W 78–73 ^{OT}	2–0	Fifth Third Arena (1,219); Cincinnati, OH
November 17, 2019*; 7:00 p.m.		Ohio	L 68–74	2–1	Value City Arena (5,213); Columbus, OH
November 21, 2019*; 12:30 p.m.		at Kent State	W 75–65	3–1	MAC Center (4,272); Kent, OH
November 24, 2019*; 3:00 p.m., ESPN		No. 4 UConn	L 62–73	3–2	Value City Arena (8,909); Columbus, OH
November 29, 2019*; 11:30 p.m.		vs. South Dakota; South Point Thanksgiving Shootout	L 53–68	3–3	South Point Arena (300); Las Vegas, NV
November 30, 2019*; 1:45 a.m.		vs. Northern Iowa; South Point Thanksgiving Shootout	W 64–46	4–3	South Point Arena (250); Las Vegas, NV
December 5, 2019*; 8:00 p.m., BTN		No. 2 Louisville; ACC–Big Ten Women's Challenge	W 67–60	5–3	Value City Arena (3,807); Columbus, OH
December 8, 2019*; 7:00 p.m.		Radford	W 70–57	6–3	Value City Arena (3,902); Columbus, OH
December 15, 2019*; 1:30 a.m.		at No. 1 Stanford	L 52–71	6–4	Maples Pavilion (2,970); Stanford, CA
December 17, 2019*; 11:00 p.m.		at Sacramento State	W 104–74	7–4	Hornets Nest (318); Sacramento, CA
Big Ten regular season
December 28, 2019; 12:00 p.m., BTN Plus		Purdue	L 50–66	7–5 (0–1)	Value City Arena (4,212); Columbus, OH
December 31, 2019; 4:00 p.m., BTN Plus		at No. 24 Minnesota	W 66–63	8–5 (1–1)	Williams Arena (3,982); Minneapolis, MN
January 6, 2020; 7:00 p.m., ESPN2		at No. 17 Maryland	L 62–72	8–6 (1–2)	Xfinity Center (4,427); College Park, MD
January 9, 2020; 6:00 p.m., BTN		No. 24 Michigan; Rivalry	W 78–69	9–6 (2–2)	Value City Arena (4,230); Columbus, OH
January 12, 2020; 7:00 p.m.		Penn State	W 80–70	10–6 (3–2)	Value City Arena (5,428); Columbus, OH
January 16, 2020; 6:00 p.m., BTN		at Michigan State	L 65–68	10–7 (3–3)	Breslin Center (3,700); East Lansing, MI
January 19, 2020; 7:00 p.m.		Illinois	W 77–47	11–7 (4–3)	Value City Arena (5,143); Columbus, OH
January 23, 2020; 7:00 p.m., BTN		at No. 19 Iowa	L 68–77	11–8 (4–4)	Carver–Hawkeye Arena (6,490); Iowa City, IA
January 30, 2020; 6:30 p.m., BTN		No. 17 Maryland	L 65–85	11–9 (4–5)	Value City Arena (5,380); Columbus, OH
February 2, 2020; 8:00 p.m.		at Nebraska	W 80–74 ^{OT}	12–9 (5–5)	Pinnacle Bank Arena (4,189); Lincoln, NE
February 6, 2020; 9:00 p.m.		at Illinois	W 78–58	13–9 (6–5)	State Farm Center (2,388); Champaign, IL
February 9, 2020; 7:00 p.m.		Wisconsin	W 82–74	14–9 (7–5)	Value City Arena (6,075); Columbus, OH
February 13, 2020; 6:00 p.m., BTN+		Minnesota	W 99–76	15–9 (8–5)	Value City Arena (3,721); Columbus, OH
February 16, 2020; 2:00 p.m., BTN+		at No. 20 Indiana	W 80–76	16–9 (9–5)	Simon Skjodt Assembly Hall (6,142); Bloomington, IN
February 19, 2020; 9:00 p.m.		Nebraska	W 65–52	17–9 (10–5)	Value City Arena (3,896); Columbus, OH
February 22, 2020; 2:00 p.m., BTN		at Rutgers	L 57–59	17–10 (10–6)	Louis Brown Athletic Center (2,281); Piscataway, NJ
February 25, 2020; 5:00 p.m., BTN		No. 14 Northwestern	L 55–69	17–11 (10–7)	Value City Arena (4,403); Columbus, OH
Funerary 29, 2020; 4:00 p.m., BTN		at Purdue	W 77–56	18–11 (11–7)	Mackey Arena (6,753); West Lafayette, IN
Big Ten Women's Tournament
March 5, 2020; 9:00 p.m., BTN	(6)	vs. (11) Minnesota; Second Round	W 77–56	19–11	Bankers Life Fieldhouse (4,349); Indianapolis, IN
March 6, 2020; 9:00 p.m., BTN	(6)	vs. (3) No. 19 Iowa; Quarterfinals	W 87–66	20–11	Bankers Life Fieldhouse (4,798); Indianapolis, IN
March 7, 2020; 9:00 p.m., BTN	(6)	vs. (7) Michigan; Semifinals	W 66–60	21–11	Bankers Life Fieldhouse (7,213); Indianapolis, IN
March 8, 2020; 6:00 p.m., ESPN2	(6)	vs. (1) No. 6 Maryland; Final	L 65–82	21–12	Bankers Life Fieldhouse (4,687); Indianapolis, IN
*Non-conference game. ^{#}Rankings from AP Poll. (#) Tournament seedings in parentheses. All times are in Eastern Time.

== Rankings ==
Regular season polls
Poll	Pre- season	Week 2	Week 3	Week 4	Week 5	Week 6	Week 7	Week 8	Week 9	Week 10	Week 11	Week 12	Week 13	Week 14	Week 15	Week 16	Week 17	Week 18	Week 19	Final
AP	RV					RV	RV												RV	RV
Coaches	RV				RV										RV	RV		RV	RV	N/A

Legend
	Increase in ranking
	Decrease in ranking
	Not ranked previous week
(RV)	Received votes

== See also ==
- 2019–20 Ohio State Buckeyes men's basketball team
