= 2019–20 Big Ten Conference women's basketball season =

- League: NCAA Division I
- Sport: Basketball
- Teams: 14
- TV partner(s): Big Ten Network, ESPN, Fox, FS1

2019–20 NCAA Division I women's basketball season

Tournament

Basketball seasons
- ← 2018–19 2020–21 →

2019–20 Big Ten women's basketball standings
	Conf.				Overall
Team	W		L	PCT	W		L	PCT
No. 4 Maryland†	16	–	2	.889	28	–	4	.875
No. 12 Northwestern	16	–	2	.889	26	–	4	.867
No. 21 Iowa	14	–	4	.778	23	–	7	.767
No. 20 Indiana	13	–	5	.722	24	–	8	.750
Rutgers	11	–	7	.611	22	–	9	.710
Ohio State	11	–	7	.611	21	–	12	.636
Michigan	10	–	8	.556	21	–	11	.656
Michigan State	9	–	9	.500	16	–	14	.533
Purdue	8	–	10	.444	18	–	14	.563
Nebraska	7	–	11	.389	17	–	13	.567
Minnesota	5	–	13	.278	16	–	15	.516
Wisconsin	3	–	15	.167	12	–	19	.387
Illinois	2	–	16	.111	11	–	19	.367
Penn State	1	–	17	.056	7	–	23	.233
† 2020 Big Ten tournament winner Rankings from AP poll

The 2019–20 Big Ten women's basketball season began with practices in October 2019, followed by the start of the 2019–20 NCAA Division I women's basketball season in November 2019. The regular season ended in March, 2020.

The Big Ten tournament was played at Bankers Life Fieldhouse in Indianapolis, Indiana in March 2020.

== Head coaches ==
=== Coaching changes prior to the season ===
==== Penn State ====
On March 9, 2019, Penn State fired head coach Coquese Washington. On April 3, 2019, the school hired Carolyn Kieger away from Marquette to serve as head coach.

=== Coaches ===
Team	Head coach	Previous job	Years at school	Overall record	Big Ten record	Big Ten titles	Big Ten tournament titles	NCAA Tournaments	NCAA Final Fours	NCAA Championships
Illinois	Nancy Fahey	Washington (MO)	3	19–42	2–32	0	0	0	0	0
Indiana	Teri Moren	Indiana State	6	103–66	43–43	0	0	2	0	0
Iowa	Lisa Bluder	Drake	20	393–215	193–124	1	2	14	0	0
Maryland	Brenda Frese	Minnesota	18	458–124	78–10*	4	3	15	3	1
Michigan	Kim Barnes Arico	St. John's (Asst.)	8	156–85	66–52	0	0	3	0	0
Michigan State	Suzy Merchant	Eastern Michigan	13	265–134	127–77	2	0	9	0	0
Minnesota	Lindsay Whalen	Minnesota Lynx (Player)	2	21–11	9–9	0	0	0	0	0
Nebraska	Amy Williams	South Dakota	4	42–49	23–27	0	0	1	0	0
Northwestern	Joe McKeown	George Washington	11	180–172	67–119	0	0	1	0	0
Ohio State	Kevin McGuff	Washington	7	134–65	71–31	2	1	4	0	0
Penn State	Carolyn Kieger	Marquette	1	0–0	0–0	0	0	0	0	0
Purdue	Sharon Versyp	Indiana	14	276–162	128–92	0	4	9	0	0
Rutgers	C. Vivian Stringer	Iowa	25	499–277	42–42*	0	0	16	2	0
Wisconsin	Jonathan Tsipis	George Washington	4	33–61	9–41	0	0	0	0	0

Notes:

- All records, appearances, titles, etc. are from time with current school only.
- Year at school includes 2019–20 season.
- Overall and Big Ten records are from time at current school and are through the beginning of the season.
- Frese's ACC conference record excluded since Maryland began Big Ten Conference play in 2014–15.
- Stringer's Big East and American conference record excluded since Rutgers began Big Ten Conference play in 2014–15.

== Preseason ==
=== Preseason conference poll ===
The Big Ten released the preseason ranking on October 23, 2019, which featured a ranking by both media and coaches.

Media
Ranking	Team
1	Maryland
2	Michigan
3	Michigan State
4	Indiana
5	Minnesota

Coaches
Ranking	Team
1	Maryland
2	Michigan State
3	Indiana
4	Michigan
5	Purdue

=== Preseason All-Big Ten ===
On October 21, 2019, a panel of conference media selected a 10-member preseason All-Big Ten Team and Player of the Year.

Honor	Recipient
Preseason Player of the Year	Kaila Charles, Maryland
Preseason All-Big Ten Team	Ali Patberg, Indiana
Preseason All-Big Ten Team	Kathleen Doyle, Iowa
Preseason All-Big Ten Team	Kaila Charles*, Maryland
Preseason All-Big Ten Team	Taylor Mikesell, Maryland
Preseason All-Big Ten Team	Naz Hillmon*, Michigan
Preseason All-Big Ten Team	Shay Colley, Michigan State
Preseason All-Big Ten Team	Destiny Pitts, Minnesota
Preseason All-Big Ten Team	Lindsey Pulliam, Northwestern
Preseason All-Big Ten Team	Ae'Rianna Harris, Purdue
Preseason All-Big Ten Team	Karissa McLaughlin, Purdue
*Unanimous selections

=== Preseason watchlists ===
Below is a table of notable preseason watch lists.

	Wooden	Naismith	Drysdale	Lieberman	Miller	McClain	Leslie
Ali Patberg, Indiana	✓	✓		✓			
Kathleen Doyle, Iowa			✓				
Shakira Austin, Maryland		✓					✓
Kaila Charles, Maryland	✓	✓			✓		
Stephanie Jones, Maryland						✓	
Taylor Mikesell, Maryland			✓				
Naz Hillmon, Michigan		✓				✓	
Shay Colley, Michigan State		✓					
Taiye Bello, Minnesota						✓	
Destiny Pitts, Minnesota			✓				
Kate Cain, Nebraska							✓
Lindsey Pulliam, Northwestern			✓				
Ae'Rianna Harris, Purdue		✓					✓

=== Preseason national polls ===
	AP	CBS Sports	Coaches	ESPN	ESPNW
Illinois					
Indiana	24	16		21	24
Iowa					
Maryland	4	5	5	5	5
Michigan	25	24	24	23	23
Michigan State	17		21	25	
Minnesota	23	18		16	17
Nebraska					
Northwestern					
Ohio State					
Penn State					
Purdue					
Rutgers					
Wisconsin					

== Regular season ==
=== Rankings ===
Legend
	Improvement in ranking
	Drop in ranking
	Not ranked previous week
RV	Received votes but were not ranked in Top 25 of poll
(Italics)	Number of first place votes

		Pre/ Wk 1	Wk 2	Wk 3	Wk 4	Wk 5	Wk 6	Wk 7	Wk 8	Wk 9	Wk 10	Wk 11	Wk 12	Wk 13	Wk 14	Wk 15	Wk 16	Wk 17	Wk 18	Wk 19	Wk 20	Final
Illinois	AP																					
Illinois	C																					
Indiana	AP	24	21	18	17	14	12	12	14	14	12	15	17	20	18	20	24	22				
Indiana	C	RV	25	23	16	15	14	15	15	13	16	24	23	22	23	RV	24					
Iowa	AP	RV							RV		RV	22	19	18	20	17	19	18				
Iowa	C	RV								RV	24	21	19	20	20	21	20					
Maryland	AP	4	8	9	9	9	13	13	12	12	17	20	20	17	13	10	7	7				
Maryland	C	5	10	10	9	12	11	11	11	16	20	17	16	12	10	8	7					
Michigan	AP	25	24	21	RV	24	24	24	23	RV	24											
Michigan	C	24	19	RV	25	22	22	23	RV	RV												
Michigan State	AP																					
Michigan State	C																					
Minnesota	AP																					
Minnesota	C																					
Nebraska	AP																					
Nebraska	C																					
Northwestern	AP																					
Northwestern	C																					
Ohio State	AP																					
Ohio State	C																					
Penn State	AP																					
Penn State	C																					
Purdue	AP																					
Purdue	C																					
Rutgers	AP																					
Rutgers	C																					
Wisconsin	AP																					
Wisconsin	C																					

=== Early season tournaments ===
Nine of the 14 Big Ten teams participated in early season tournaments. All Big Ten teams participated in the ACC–Big Ten Women's Challenge against Atlantic Coast Conference teams, the 13th year for the event.

Team	Tournament	Finish
Indiana	Paradise Jam tournament	3rd
Iowa	Puerto Rico Clasico	2nd
Maryland	Dayton Beach Invitational	
Michigan State	Junkanoo Jam	3rd
Purdue	Gulf Coast Showcase	2nd
Rutgers	Junkanoo Jam	1st
