= 2019–20 Iowa Hawkeyes women's basketball team =

American college basketball season

2019–20 Iowa Hawkeyes women's basketball
- Conference: Big Ten Conference

Ranking
- Coaches: No. 20
- AP: No. 21
- Record: 23–7 (14–4 Big Ten)
- Head coach: Lisa Bluder (20th season)
- Assistant coaches: Jan Jensen; Raina Harmon; Abby Stamp
- Home arena: Carver–Hawkeye Arena

2019–20 Big Ten women's basketball standings
	Conf.				Overall
Team	W		L	PCT	W		L	PCT
No. 4 Maryland†	16	–	2	.889	28	–	4	.875
No. 12 Northwestern	16	–	2	.889	26	–	4	.867
No. 21 Iowa	14	–	4	.778	23	–	7	.767
No. 20 Indiana	13	–	5	.722	24	–	8	.750
Rutgers	11	–	7	.611	22	–	9	.710
Ohio State	11	–	7	.611	21	–	12	.636
Michigan	10	–	8	.556	21	–	11	.656
Michigan State	9	–	9	.500	16	–	14	.533
Purdue	8	–	10	.444	18	–	14	.563
Nebraska	7	–	11	.389	17	–	13	.567
Minnesota	5	–	13	.278	16	–	15	.516
Wisconsin	3	–	15	.167	12	–	19	.387
Illinois	2	–	16	.111	11	–	19	.367
Penn State	1	–	17	.056	7	–	23	.233
† 2020 Big Ten tournament winner Rankings from AP poll

The 2019–20 Iowa Hawkeyes women's basketball team represented the University of Iowa during the 2019–20 NCAA Division I women's basketball season. The Hawkeyes, led by 20th year head coach Lisa Bluder, played their home games at Carver–Hawkeye Arena in Iowa City, IA as members of the Big Ten Conference.

On March 12, 2020, the NCAA canceled the 2020 women's basketball tournament due to the COVID-19 pandemic. At the time this cancellation was announced, Iowa had yet to qualify or be selected for tournament play.

The Hawkeyes ended the year with a 23–7 record, an undefeated record on home-court (extending their streak to a total of 36 consecutive wins), and a third-place finish in the regular season in the Big Ten Conference.

== Off-season ==
=== Departures ===
Name	#	Pos.	Height	Year	Hometown	Reason for departure
Megan Gustafson	10	F	6'3"	Senior	Port Wing, WI	Completed college eligibility/ Declared for WNBA draft
Tania Davis	11	G	5'4"	Senior	Grand Blanc, MI	Completed college eligibility
Hannah Stewart	21	F	6'2"	Senior	Minot, ND	Completed college eligibility

=== Recruits ===
College recruiting
Name	Hometown	School	Height	Weight	Commit date
McKenna Warnock; W	Marshall, WI	Monona Grove	6 ft 1 in (1.85 m)	N/A	Oct 7, 2018
McKenna Warnock; W	Recruit ratings: ESPN: (94)				
Gabbie Marshall; PG	Cincinnati, OH	Mount Notre Dame	5 ft 7 in (1.70 m)	N/A	Oct 29, 2017
Gabbie Marshall; PG	Recruit ratings: ESPN: (90)				
Megan Meyer; PG	Mason City, IA	Mason City	5 ft 8 in (1.73 m)	N/A	Jun 15, 2017
Megan Meyer; PG	Recruit ratings: ESPN: (90)				
Overall recruit ranking:
Note: In many cases, Scout, Rivals, 247Sports, On3, and ESPN may conflict in their listings of height and weight.; In these cases, the average was taken. ESPN grades are on a 100-point scale.; Sources: "2019 Player Commits". ESPN. Archived from the original on January 15, 2021.

== Roster ==
2019–20 Iowa Hawkeyes women's basketball team
Players
Coaches

Pos.	#	Name	Height	Year	Previous school	Hometown
G	1	Tomi Taiwo	5 ft 10 in (1.78 m)	So	Carmel	Carmel, IN
G	3	Makenzie Meyer (C)	5 ft 10 in (1.78 m)	Sr	Mason City	Mason City, IA
G	5	Alexis Sevillian (C)	5 ft 6 in (1.68 m)	RS Jr	Goodrich	Goodrich, MI
G	11	Megan Meyer	5 ft 8 in (1.73 m)	Fr	Mason City	Mason City, IA
G/F	14	McKenna Warnock	6 ft 1 in (1.85 m)	Fr	Monona Grove	Marshall, WI
G	20	Kate Martin	6 ft 0 in (1.83 m)	RS Fr	Edwardsville	Edwardsville, IL
G	21	Zion Sanders (W)	5 ft 8 in (1.73 m)	Jr	Central	Evansville, IN
G	22	Kathleen Doyle (C)	5 ft 9 in (1.75 m)	Sr	Benet Academy	LaGrange Park, IL
F	23	Logan Cook	6 ft 1 in (1.85 m)	So	Iowa City West	Iowa City, IA
G	24	Gabbie Marshall	5 ft 9 in (1.75 m)	Fr	Mount Notre Dame	Cincinnati, OH
F/C	25	Monika Czinano	6 ft 3 in (1.91 m)	So	Watertown-Mayer	Watertown, MN
F/C	31	Paula Valiño Ramos	6 ft 3 in (1.91 m)	Jr	Ies Otero Pedrayo	Ourense, SP, Spain
F	43	Amanda Ollinger	6 ft 1 in (1.85 m)	Sr	Linn-Mar	Cedar Rapids, IA

Head coach

- Lisa Bluder (Northern Iowa)

Assistant coach(es)

- Jan Jensen (Drake)
- Raina Harmon (Central Michigan)
- Abby Stamp (Iowa)
- Kathryn Reynolds (Director of Player Development) (Iowa)
- Jenni Fitzgerald (Special Assistant to the Head Coach) (Drake)
- Ryan Gruebel (Video Coordinator & Creative Director) (Ohio State)

Legend

- (C) Team captain
- (S) Suspended
- (I) Ineligible
- (W) Walk-on
- Injured
- Current redshirt

Roster
Last update: November 6, 2019

== Schedule and results ==
Date time, TV	Rank^{#}	Opponent^{#}	Result	Record	High points	High rebounds	High assists	Site city, state
Exhibition
November 3, 2019*; 2:00 pm		Winona State	W 98–53	—	27 – Czinano	8 – Ollinger	8 – Ma. Meyer	Carver–Hawkeye Arena (3,407); Iowa City, IA
Non-conference regular season
November 7, 2019*; 6:30 pm, BTN+		Florida Atlantic	W 85–53	1–0	15 – Doyle	10 – Warnock	5 – Tied	Carver–Hawkeye Arena (3,334); Iowa City, IA
November 14, 2019*; 6:30 pm, BTN+		North Alabama	W 86–81	2–0	21 – Ma. Meyer	7 – Ma. Meyer	7 – Doyle	Carver–Hawkeye Arena (5,446); Iowa City, IA
November 17, 2019*; 2:00 pm		at Northern Iowa	L 66–88	2–1	14 – Ma. Meyer	10 – Ollinger	3 – Ma. Meyer	McLeod Center (3,255); Cedar Falls, IA
November 20, 2019*; 6:30 pm, BTN+		Princeton	W 77–75	3–1	21 – Doyle	13 – Ollinger	9 – Doyle	Carver–Hawkeye Arena (5,885); Iowa City, IA
November 27, 2019*; 6:30 pm, FloHoops.com		vs. Cincinnati; Puerto Rico Clasico	W 69–61	4–1	16 – Czinano	8 – Doyle	6 – Doyle	Coliseo Rubén Rodríguez (100); Bayamón, Puerto Rico
November 28, 2019*; 12:00 pm, FloHoops.com		vs. Towson; Puerto Rico Clasico	W 100–72	5–1	29 – Ma. Meyer	7 – Czinano	4 – Tied	Rubén Zayas Montañez Coliseum (100); Trujillo Alto, Puerto Rico
November 30, 2019*; 12:00 pm, FloHoops.com		vs. Washington; Puerto Rico Clasico	L 63–70	5–2	17 – Doyle	7 – Tied	7 – Doyle	Rubén Zayas Montañez Coliseum (100); Trujillo Alto, Puerto Rico
December 4, 2019*; 8:00 pm, BTN		Clemson; ACC–Big Ten Women's Challenge	W 74–60	6–2	24 – Czinano	9 – Ollinger	9 – Tied	Carver–Hawkeye Arena (5,884); Iowa City, IA
December 11, 2019*; 7:00 pm, FS1		at Iowa State; Iowa Corn Cy-Hawk Series	W 75–69	7–2	21 – Doyle	20 – Ollinger	5 – Ma. Meyer	Hilton Coliseum (10,196); Ames, IA
December 14, 2019*; 2:00 pm, BTN+		North Carolina Central	W 102–50	8–2	19 – Ma. Meyer	7 – Ollinger	9 – Doyle	Carver–Hawkeye Arena (4,262); Iowa City, IA
December 21, 2019*; 6:00 pm, BTN+		Drake	W 79–67	9–2	24 – Ma. Meyer	9 – Ollinger	10 – Doyle	Carver–Hawkeye Arena (7,625); Iowa City, IA
Big Ten conference season
December 28, 2019; 1:00 pm, BTN+		at Nebraska	L 69–78	9–3 (0–1)	19 – Doyle	17 – Czinano	4 – Ma. Meyer	Pinnacle Bank Arena (5,228); Lincoln, NE
December 31, 2019; 2:00 pm, BTN+		Illinois	W 108–72	10–3 (1–1)	33 – Doyle	14 – Ollinger	7 – Sevillian	Carver–Hawkeye Arena (6,942); Iowa City, IA
January 5, 2020; 1:00 pm, BTN		at Northwestern	W 77–51	11–3 (2–1)	21 – Czinano	12 – Ollinger	7 – Doyle	Welsh–Ryan Arena (1,843); Evanston, IL
January 9, 2020; 7:00 pm, BTN		No. 17 Maryland	W 66–61	12–3 (3–1)	21 – Doyle	9 – Ollinger	6 – Ma. Meyer	Carver–Hawkeye Arena (6,689); Iowa City, IA
January 12, 2020; 4:00 pm, BTN		No. 12 Indiana	W 91–85 ^{2OT}	13–3 (4–1)	31 – Doyle	10 – Ollinger	10 – Doyle	Carver–Hawkeye Arena (7,397); Iowa City, IA
January 16, 2020; 7:00 pm, BTN+	No. 22	at Minnesota	W 76–75	14–3 (5–1)	21 – Czinano	6 – Doyle	9 – Ma. Meyer	Williams Arena (3,412); Minneapolis, MN
January 19, 2020; 2:00 pm, BTN+	No. 22	at Wisconsin	W 85–78	15–3 (6–1)	22 – Ma. Meyer	9 – Ollinger	6 – Ma. Meyer	Kohl Center (6,460); Madison, WI
January 23, 2020; 7:00 pm, BTN	No. 19	Ohio State	W 77–68	16–3 (7–1)	26 – Doyle	8 – Doyle	7 – Doyle	Carver–Hawkeye Arena (6,490); Iowa City, IA
January 26, 2020; 3:00 pm, BTN	No. 19	Michigan State	W 74–57	17–3 (8–1)	22 – Warnock	10 – Warnock	5 – Doyle	Carver–Hawkeye Arena (13,420); Iowa City, IA
January 30, 2020; 6:00 pm, BTN+	No. 18	at Penn State	W 77–66	18–3 (9–1)	23 – Doyle	9 – Ollinger	8 – Doyle	Bryce Jordan Center (1,657); University Park, PA
February 2, 2020; 11:00 am, BTN	No. 18	at Michigan	L 63–78	18–4 (9–2)	15 – Sevillian	8 – Ollinger	5 – Doyle	Crisler Center (3,124); Ann Arbor, MI
February 6, 2020; 6:30 pm, BTN+	No. 20	Nebraska	W 76–60	19–4 (10–2)	23 – Czinano	13 – Ollinger	15 – Doyle	Carver–Hawkeye Arena (6,967); Iowa City, IA
February 9, 2020; 1:00 pm, BTN+	No. 20	at Purdue	W 83–71	20–4 (11–2)	22 – Ma. Meyer	12 – Ollinger	6 – Ma. Meyer	Mackey Arena (6,681); West Lafayette, IN
February 13, 2020; 5:00 pm, BTN	No. 17	at No. 10 Maryland	L 59–93	20–5 (11–3)	15 – Czinano	7 – Czinano	3 – Doyle	Xfinity Center (5,446); College Park, MD
February 16, 2020; 2:00 pm, BTN+	No. 17	Wisconsin	W 97–71	21–5 (12–3)	22 – Doyle	10 – Ollinger	5 – Doyle	Carver–Hawkeye Arena (9,506); Iowa City, IA
February 22, 2020; 2:00 pm, BTN+	No. 19	Penn State	W 100–57	22–5 (13–3)	23 – Czinano	7 – Czinano	8 – Sevillian	Carver–Hawkeye Arena (8,389); Iowa City, IA
February 27, 2020; 6:30 pm	No. 18	Minnesota	W 90–82	23–5 (14–3)	24 – Czinano	6 – Czinano	6 – Ma. Meyer	Carver–Hawkeye Arena (8,297); Iowa City, IA
March 1, 2020; 11:00 am, BTN	No. 18	at Rutgers	L 74–78 ^{OT}	23–6 (14–4)	22 – Marshall	7 – Warnock	9 – Doyle	Louis Brown Athletic Center (2,680); Piscataway, NJ
Big Ten Women's Tournament
March 6, 2020; 8:00 pm, BTN	(3) No. 19	vs. (6) Ohio State; Quarterfinals	L 66–87	23–7	16 – Doyle	7 – Ma. Meyer	4 – Doyle	Bankers Life Fieldhouse; Indianapolis, IN
*Non-conference game. ^{#}Rankings from AP Poll. (#) Tournament seedings in parentheses. G=Greensboro Region. All times are in Central Time.

== Rankings ==
Ranking movement Legend: ██ Increase in ranking. ██ Decrease in ranking. NR = Not ranked. RV = Received votes.
Poll	Pre	Wk 2	Wk 3	Wk 4	Wk 5	Wk 6	Wk 7	Wk 8	Wk 9	Wk 10	Wk 11	Wk 12	Wk 13	Wk 14	Wk 15	Wk 16	Wk 17	Wk 18	Wk 19	Final
AP	RV									RV	22	19	18	20	17	19	18	19	21	N/A
Coaches	RV																			

== 2020 WNBA draft ==
Round	Pick	Player	WNBA club
2	14	Kathleen Doyle	Indiana Fever

== See also ==
2019–20 Iowa Hawkeyes men's basketball team
