= 2020 ASUN women's basketball tournament =

- Classification: Division I
- Season: 2019–20
- Teams: 8
- Site: Campus sites
- Television: ESPN+

2019–20 ASUN women's basketball standings
	Conf.				Overall
Team	W		L	PCT	W		L	PCT
Florida Gulf Coast	15	–	1	.938	28	–	3	.903
North Alabama*	11	–	5	.688	20	–	8	.714
Liberty	11	–	5	.688	18	–	11	.621
Jacksonville	10	–	6	.625	18	–	11	.621
North Florida	8	–	8	.500	15	–	14	.517
Kennesaw State	6	–	10	.375	13	–	15	.464
Stetson	6	–	10	.375	12	–	17	.414
Lipscomb	4	–	12	.250	7	–	22	.241
NJIT	1	–	15	.063	4	–	25	.138
* ineligible for the 2020 NCAA tournament due to transition period
† 2020 ASUN Tournament winner As of March 12, 2025; Rankings from AP poll

The 2020 ASUN women's basketball tournament was the 34th edition of the ASUN Conference championship. It took place March 7, 11, and 15 in several arenas at campus sites. The winner would have received the league's automatic bid to the 2020 NCAA tournament.

== Format ==
The ASUN Championship is a three-day single-elimination tournament. Eight teams will compete in the championship, with the higher seeded team in each matchup hosting the game.

== Seeds ==
Seed	School	Conference	Overall	Tiebreaker
1	Florida Gulf Coast	15-1	28-3	
2	North Alabama	11–5	20-8	
3	Liberty	11-5	18-11	
4	Jacksonville	10–6	18-11	
5	North Florida	8-8	15-14	
6	Kennesaw State	6-10	13–15	
7	Stetson	6-10	12-17	
8	Lipscomb	4-12	7-22	
Overall records are as of the end of the regular season.

== Schedule ==
Game	Matchup^{#}	Time*	Television
Quarterfinals – Saturday, March 7
1	No. 5 North Florida at No. 4 Jacksonville	1:00 pm	ESPN+
2	No. 7 Stetson at No. 2 North Alabama	2:00 pm	ESPN+
3	No. 6 Kennesaw State at No. 3 Liberty	4:00 pm	ESPN+
4	No. 8 Lipscomb at No. 1 Florida Gulf Coast	7:30 pm	ESPN+
Semifinals – Wednesday, March 11
5	No. 5 North Florida vs. No. 1 Florida Gulf Coast	7:00 pm	ESPN+
6	No. 3 Liberty vs. No. 2 North Alabama	7:00 pm	ESPN+
Championship – Sunday, March 15
7	No. 3 Liberty vs. No. 1 Florida Gulf Coast	Cancelled	
*Game times in ET. #-Rankings denote tournament seeding. All games hosted by higher-seeded team.

== Bracket ==
Quarterfinals; March 7 ESPN+
1	Florida Gulf Coast	104
8	Lipscomb	71
4	Jacksonville	67
5	North Florida	77*
2	North Alabama	70
7	Stetson	60
3	Liberty	91
6	Kennesaw State	86

Semifinals; March 11; ESPN+
1	Florida Gulf Coast	73
5	North Florida	57
2	North Alabama	87
3	Liberty	90*

Championship; March 15; ESPN+
1	Florida Gulf Coast
3	Liberty

* denotes overtime

== See also ==
- 2020 Atlantic Sun men's basketball tournament
