= 2019–20 Florida Gulf Coast Eagles women's basketball team =

Intercollegiate basketball season

2019–20 Florida Gulf Coast Eagles women's basketball
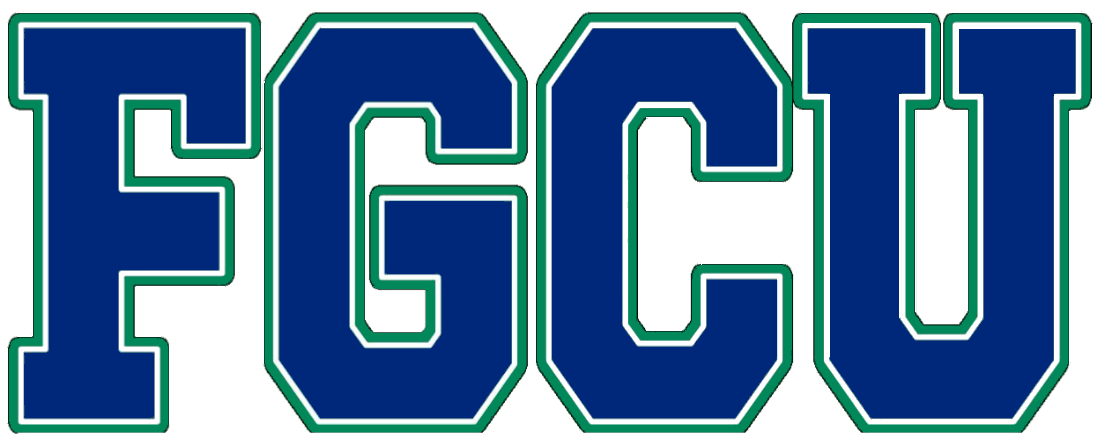

Cancún Challenge champions Atlantic Sun regular season champions
- Conference: Atlantic Sun Conference

Ranking
- Coaches: No. 24
- AP: No. RV
- Record: 30–3 (15–1 A-Sun)
- Head coach: Karl Smesko (18th season)
- Assistant coaches: Chelsea Lyles; Shannon Murphy; Mandi Pierce
- Home arena: Alico Arena

2019–20 ASUN women's basketball standings
	Conf.				Overall
Team	W		L	PCT	W		L	PCT
Florida Gulf Coast	15	–	1	.938	28	–	3	.903
North Alabama*	11	–	5	.688	20	–	8	.714
Liberty	11	–	5	.688	18	–	11	.621
Jacksonville	10	–	6	.625	18	–	11	.621
North Florida	8	–	8	.500	15	–	14	.517
Kennesaw State	6	–	10	.375	13	–	15	.464
Stetson	6	–	10	.375	12	–	17	.414
Lipscomb	4	–	12	.250	7	–	22	.241
NJIT	1	–	15	.063	4	–	25	.138
† 2020 ASUN Tournament winner * ineligible for the 2020 NCAA tournament due to transition period Rankings from AP poll

The 2019–20 Florida Gulf Coast Eagles women's basketball team represented Florida Gulf Coast University during the 2019–20 NCAA Division I women's basketball season. The Eagles, led by eighteenth year head coach Karl Smesko, played their home games at the Alico Arena and were members of the Atlantic Sun Conference. They finished the season 30–3, 15–1 in A-Sun play to win the Atlantic Sun regular season.

Florida Gulf Coast was scheduled to play in the conference tournament championship game versus Liberty, but it was canceled due to the COVID-19 pandemic. Post-season play ended there as the NCAA women's basketball tournament and WNIT were all cancelled before they began due to the pandemic.

== Roster ==
2019–20 Florida Gulf Coast Eagles women's basketball team
Players
Coaches

Pos.	#	Name	Height	Year	Previous school	Hometown
G	0	Davion Wingate	5 ft 6 in (1.68 m)	RS Sr	Stephenson; Stony Brook	Atlanta, GA
G/F	1	Erna Normil	5 ft 10 in (1.78 m)	RS Jr	Lake Worth; Florida Southwestern	Lake Worth, FL
G	2	Alyssa Blair	5 ft 11 in (1.8 m)	Jr	Sun Prairie	Sun Prairie, WI
G	3	Keri Jewett-Giles	5 ft 6 in (1.68 m)	RS Sr	Dunbar; Southern Miss	Fort Myers, FL
G	4	Chandler Ryan	5 ft 7 in (1.7 m)	RS Jr	Morton	Groveland, IL
G	5	Anja Marinkovic	5 ft 8 in (1.73 m)	RS Jr	Northern Secondary; Detroit Mercy	Sombor, Serbia
G	10	Sheahen Dowling	5 ft 7 in (1.7 m)	Jr	Trinity	Chicago, IL
G	13	Kerstie Phills	5 ft 9 in (1.75 m)	RS Jr	Charlotte Christian; Wagner	Charlotte, NC
G	15	Tyra Cox	5 ft 8 in (1.73 m)	RS So	Lake Highland Prep; William & Mary	Orlando, FL
G/F	20	Tanner Bryant	5 ft 11 in (1.8 m)	So	Miami Trace	Washington Court House, OH
G	21	Kierra Adams	6 ft 0 in (1.83 m)	Fr	Brookwood	Lawrenceville, GA
G	23	Ashley Panem	5 ft 9 in (1.75 m)	RS Fr	Fairview	Broomfield, CO
G/F	31	Nasrin Ulel	5 ft 9 in (1.75 m)	Sr	Murrieta	Murrieta, CA
G	32	Emma List	5 ft 10 in (1.78 m)	RS So	Discovery Canyon; Albany	Colorado Springs, CO
G	34	Ashli O'Neal	5 ft 5 in (1.65 m)	GS	Wyoming; Indiana State	Wyoming, OH
F	42	Tytionia Adderly	5 ft 10 in (1.78 m)	Sr	Cardinal Newman	Jupiter, FL

Head coach

- Karl Smesko (Kent State)

Assistant coach(es)

- Chelsea Lyles (Florida Gulf Coast)
- Shannon Murphy (Florida Gulf Coast)
- Mandi Pierce (St. Bonaventure)

Legend

- (C) Team captain
- (S) Suspended
- (I) Ineligible
- (W) Walk-on
- Injured
- Current redshirt

Roster
Last update: May 4, 2020

== Schedule ==
Date time, TV	Rank^{#}	Opponent^{#}	Result	Record	Site (attendance) city, state
Non-conference regular season
November 5, 2019*; 7:00 p.m., C-USA TV		at FIU	W 100–54	1–0	FIU Arena (369); Miami, FL
November 7, 2019*; 7:00 p.m., ESPN+		Webber International	W 99–48	2–0	Alico Arena (1,902); Fort Myers, FL
November 13, 2019*; 7:00 p.m., ESPN+		UCF	W 72–50	3–0	Alico Arena (3,077); Fort Myers, FL
November 17, 2019*; 1:00 p.m., ESPN+		at Princeton	L 53–67	3–1	Jadwin Gymnasium (763); Princeton, NJ
November 19, 2019*; 7:00 p.m., ESPN+		Johnson & Wales	W 89–56	4–1	Alico Arena (1,647); Fort Myers, FL
November 22, 2019*; 2:00 p.m.		Saint Francis	W 97–64	5–1	Alico Arena (888); Fort Myers, FL
November 28, 2019*; 1:30 p.m., FloHoops		vs. Notre Dame; Cancún Challenge	W 69–60	6–1	Hard Rock Hotel Riviera (235); Cancún, Mexico
November 29, 2019*; 1:30 p.m., FloHoops		vs. No. 20 South Florida; Cancún Challenge	W 81–77	7–1	Hard Rock Hotel Riviera (198); Cancún, Mexico
November 30, 2019*; 1:30 p.m., FloHoops		vs. South Dakota State; Cancún Challenge	W 71–70	8–1	Hard Rock Hotel Riviera (157); Cancún, Mexico
December 4, 2019*; 3:00 p.m.		at Houston	W 57–45	9–1	Fertitta Center (130); Houston, TX
December 9, 2019*; 7:00 p.m., ESPN+		Florida Memorial	W 91–47	10–1	Alico Arena (1,938); Fort Myers, FL
December 17, 2019*; 7:00 p.m., ESPN+		Central Connecticut	W 94–60	11–1	Alico Arena (1,708); Fort Myers, FL
December 19, 2019*; 7:00 p.m., ESPN+		LSU	L 63–74	11–2	Alico Arena (2,335); Fort Myers, FL
December 22, 2019*; 12:00 p.m., Owls TV		at Temple	W 93–67	12–2	McGonigle Hall (1,211); Philadelphia, PA
December 29, 2019*; 2:00 p.m., ESPN+		Duke	W 78–56	13–2	Alico Arena (3,267); Fort Myers, FL
Atlantic Sun Conference regular season
January 4, 2020; 4:00 p.m., ESPN+		Lipscomb	W 82–56	14–2 (1–0)	Alico Arena (2,186); Fort Myers, FL
January 6, 2020; 7:00 p.m., ESPN+		Liberty	W 64–57	15–2 (2–0)	Alico Arena (2,514); Fort Myers, FL
January 11, 2020; 1:00 p.m., ESPN+		at Stetson	W 89–47	16–2 (3–0)	Edmunds Center (245); DeLand, FL
January 13, 2020; 7:00 p.m., ESPN+		at North Florida	W 72–50	17–2 (4–0)	UNF Arena (335); Jacksonville, FL
January 18, 2020; 2:00 p.m., ESPN+		at North Alabama	W 74–63	18–2 (5–0)	Flowers Hall (1,127); Florence, AL
January 20, 2020; 7:00 p.m., ESPN+		Kennesaw State	W 90–63	19–2 (6–0)	Alico Arena (2,779); Fort Myers, FL
January 25, 2020; 4:00 p.m., ESPN+		NJIT	W 82–39	20–2 (7–0)	Alico Arena (2,161); Fort Myers, FL
February 1, 2020; 2:00 p.m., ESPN+		at Liberty	W 74–65	21–2 (8–0)	Vines Center (1,603); Lynchburg, VA
February 3, 2020; 7:00 p.m., ESPN+		at Jacksonville	W 81–68	22–2 (9–0)	Swisher Gymnasium (327); Jacksonville, FL
February 8, 2020; 4:00 p.m., ESPN+		North Florida	W 76–65	23–2 (10–0)	Alico Arena (2,649); Fort Myers, FL
February 10, 2020; 7:00 p.m., ESPN+		Stetson	W 67–54	24–2 (11–0)	Alico Arena (2,594); Fort Myers, FL
February 15, 2020; 2:30 p.m., ESPN+		at Lipscomb	W 78–45	25–2 (12–0)	Allen Arena; Nashville, TN
February 17, 2020; 7:00 p.m., ESPN+		at Kennesaw State	W 89–64	26–2 (13–0)	KSU Convocation Center (675); Kennesaw, GA
February 22, 2020; 1:00 p.m., ESPN+		at NJIT	W 68–39	27–2 (14–0)	Wellness and Events Center (200); Newark, NJ
February 29, 2020; 3:30 p.m., ESPN+		North Alabama	L 55–61	27–3 (14–1)	Alico Arena (3,218); Fort Myers, FL
March 2, 2020; 7:00 p.m., ESPN+		Jacksonville	W 77–64	28–3 (15–1)	Alico Arena (2,317); Fort Myers, FL
Atlantic Sun Tournament
March 7, 2020; 7:00 p.m., ESPN+	(1)	(8) Lipscomb; Quarterfinals	W 105–71	29–3	Alico Arena (1,710); Fort Myers, FL
March 11, 2020; 7:00 p.m., ESPN+	(1)	(5) North Florida; Semifinals	W 73–57	30–3	Alico Arena (1,978); Fort Myers, FL
March 15, 2020; 3:00 p.m., ESPN+	(1)	(3) Liberty; Final	Canceled		Alico Arena; Fort Myers, FL
*Non-conference game. ^{#}Rankings from AP Poll. (#) Tournament seedings in parentheses. All times are in Eastern.

== Rankings ==
+ Regular season polls	Poll	Pre- Season	Week 2	Week 3	Week 4	Week 5	Week 6	Week 7	Week 8	Week 9	Week 10	Week 11	Week 12	Week 13	Week 14	Week 15	Week 16	Week 17	Week 18	Week 19	Final
AP					RV	RV	RV			RV	RV	RV	RV	RV	RV	RV	RV	RV	RV	RV	
Coaches	RV			RV	RV	RV	RV	25	25	RV	RV	24	24	22	22	23	24	24	24	N/A	

Legend
	Increase in ranking
	Decrease in ranking
	Not ranked previous week
(RV)	Received Votes
(NR)	Not Ranked

Coaches did not release a Week 2 poll and AP does not release a final poll.

== See also ==
- 2019–20 Florida Gulf Coast Eagles men's basketball team
