= Women's Basketball Invitational =

Women's college basketball postseason tournament

- Sport: Basketball
- Founded: 2009
- Founder: Sport Tours International
- First season: 2009–10
- Folded: 2024
- No. of teams: 8
- Country: United States
- Last champion: Cal Baptist (2023)
- Most titles: Appalachian State (2); Louisiana (2)
- Related competitions: Women's National Invitation Tournament
- Website: Website

The Women's Basketball Invitational (WBI) was a women's college basketball tournament created in 2009 by Sport Tours. The inaugural tournament occurred at the conclusion of the 2009–10 NCAA Division I women's basketball season. Selections for the WBI are announced on Selection Monday. Prior to the 2020 COVID-19 pandemic the field for the WBI consisted of a 16-team, single elimination divided into two regions with 8 seeded teams in each. The most recent format consisted of 8 teams, all of which are guraranteed 3 games. Teams were picked based on NET, record, conference standings, end of year performance, and quality wins and losses, after the NCAA, WBIT, and WNIT fields are filled.

Teams in the WBI traditionally competed on the home court of the higher seed; recent tournaments have been held at a single site. Teams not making the NCAA Division I women's basketball tournament or Women's Basketball Invitation Tournament (WBIT) were eligible for the WBI.

Although the WBI shared a similar name with the College Basketball Invitational (CBI) and filled a similar role (a postseason tournament outside the auspices of the NCAA and NIT/WBIT tournaments), the two competitions were operated by separate organizations and are unrelated except for the coincidental name. In 2024, the CBI and WBI were scheduled to be co-located at the same venue, Ocean Center in Daytona Beach, Florida, but the WBI was paused. The WBI stated that they "hoped to return in 2025," but since then, the website and social media accounts of the WBI have not been updated.

== Champions ==
Year	Champion		Runner-up		Venue and city†	
2010	Appalachian State	79	Memphis	71	Holmes Convocation Center	Boone, NC
2011	UAB	68	Cal State Bakersfield	60	Bartow Arena	Birmingham, AL
2012	Minnesota	88	Northern Iowa	74	Williams Arena	Minneapolis, MN
2013	Detroit	73	McNeese State	62	Calihan Hall	Detroit, MI
2014	UIC	73	Stephen F. Austin	64	UIC Pavilion	Chicago, IL
2015	Louisiana	52	Siena	50	Earl K. Long Gymnasium	Lafayette, LA
2016	Louisiana	87	Weber State	85	Earl K. Long Gymnasium	Lafayette, LA
2017	Rice	74	UNC Greensboro	62	Tudor Fieldhouse	Houston, TX
2018	Yale	54	Central Arkansas	50	Farris Center	Conway, AR
2019	Appalachian State (2)	76	North Texas	59	Holmes Center	Boone, NC
2020	No tournament due to the COVID-19 pandemic.					
2021	Cleveland State	67	Portland	64	William Exum Center	Frankfort, KY
2022	Saint Mary's	80	Cleveland State	73	Clive M. Beck Center	Lexington, KY
2023	Cal Baptist	63	New Mexico State	61	Clive M. Beck Center	Lexington, KY
2024–2026	Tournament not held.					

† Through the 2019 edition, games were played at campus sites; the championship game venue is listed. Starting with the 2021 edition, the entire tournament was played at a single site.

WBI Champions
– 2 championships, – 1 championship

== See also ==
- NCAA Division I women's basketball tournament
- Women's Basketball Invitation Tournament
- Women's National Invitation Tournament
- National Women's Invitational Tournament
- NCAA Division II women's basketball tournament
- NCAA Division III women's basketball tournament
- NAIA Women's Basketball Championships
