= 2019–20 North Alabama Lions women's basketball team =

Intercollegiate basketball season

2019–20 North Alabama Lions women's basketball
- Conference: Atlantic Sun Conference
- Record: 21-9 (11-5 ASUN)
- Head coach: Missy Tiber (6th season)
- Assistant coaches: Adrianne Harlow; Josh Ashley; Alison Seberger
- Home arena: Flowers Hall

2019–20 ASUN women's basketball standings
	Conf.				Overall
Team	W		L	PCT	W		L	PCT
Florida Gulf Coast	15	–	1	.938	28	–	3	.903
North Alabama*	11	–	5	.688	20	–	8	.714
Liberty	11	–	5	.688	18	–	11	.621
Jacksonville	10	–	6	.625	18	–	11	.621
North Florida	8	–	8	.500	15	–	14	.517
Kennesaw State	6	–	10	.375	13	–	15	.464
Stetson	6	–	10	.375	12	–	17	.414
Lipscomb	4	–	12	.250	7	–	22	.241
NJIT	1	–	15	.063	4	–	25	.138
† 2020 ASUN Tournament winner * ineligible for the 2020 NCAA tournament due to transition period Rankings from AP poll

The 2019–20 North Alabama Lions women's basketball team represented University of North Alabama during the 2019–20 NCAA Division I women's basketball season. They were led by head coach Missy Tiber in her seventh season at North Alabama. The Lions played their home games at the Flowers Hall in Florence, Alabama as members of the Atlantic Sun Conference.

This season was North Alabama's second of a four-year transition period from Division II to Division I. As a result, the Lions were not eligible for NCAA postseason play but participated in the ASUN tournament where they advanced to the semifinals.

== Previous season ==
The Lions finished the 2018–19 season 21-9, 10-6 to finish tied in third place in ASUN play. They received an invitation to play in the Women's Basketball Invitational (WBI), where they advanced to the semifinals before losing to North Texas. The season marked the first of a four-year transition period from Division II to Division I.

== Schedule and results ==
Date time, TV	Rank^{#}	Opponent^{#}	Result	Record	High points	High rebounds	High assists	Site (attendance) city, state
Non-conference regular season
11/07/2019*; 6:00 pm, ESPN+		Virginia University - Lynchburg	W 128-26	1–0	22 – Panetti	8 – Eubank	11 – I. Wallen	Flowers Hall (761); Florence, AL
11/9/2019*; 6:30 pm, ESPN+		Mississippi Valley State	W 86-60	2–0	18 – I. Wallen	6 – Tied	11 – I. Wallen	Flowers Hall (503); Florence, AL
11/14/2019*; 6:00 pm, BTN+		at Iowa	L 81-86	2-1	19 – E. Wallen	7 – Eubank	8 – Tied	Carver-Hawkeye Arena (5446); Iowa City, IA
*Non-conference game. ^{#}Rankings from AP Poll. (#) Tournament seedings in parentheses. All times are in Central Time.
