= 2020 Women's Basketball Invitational =

American women's college basketball tournament

- Season: 2019–20
- Teams: 16 (planned)
- Canceled due to COVID-19 pandemic

The 2020 Women's Basketball Invitational (WBI) was to be a single-elimination tournament consisting of 16 National Collegiate Athletic Association (NCAA) Division I teams that would not participate in the 2020 NCAA Division I women's basketball tournament or 2020 Women's National Invitation Tournament. The 2020 field was to be announced on March 16. First round WBI games were to occur on March 18 and 19; second-round games were to be played on March 22 and 23. The tournament semifinals were to be held March 27 and 28, and the 2019 WBI Championship game was to be held on March 31 or April 1.

On March 12, 2020, NCAA officials canceled all tournaments due to the COVID-19 pandemic.
