= 2020 Big West Conference women's basketball tournament =

- Classification: Division I
- Season: 2019–20
- Teams: 8
- First round site: Walter Pyramid; Long Beach, California
- Quarterfinals site: Walter Pyramid; Long Beach, California
- Semifinals site: Honda Center; Anaheim, California
- Finals site: Honda Center; Anaheim, California
- Television: ESPN3

2019–20 Big West women's basketball standings
| | Conf. | | | | Overall |
| Team | W | | L | PCT | W | | L | PCT |
|---|---|---|---|---|---|---|---|---|
| UC Davis | 12 | – | 4 | .750 | 17 | – | 12 | .586 |
| Hawaii | 9 | – | 7 | .563 | 16 | – | 14 | .533 |
| UC Santa Barbara | 9 | – | 7 | .563 | 14 | – | 15 | .483 |
| UC Irvine | 9 | – | 7 | .563 | 13 | – | 18 | .419 |
| Cal State Fullerton | 8 | – | 8 | .500 | 17 | – | 14 | .548 |
| Long Beach State | 8 | – | 8 | .500 | 13 | – | 17 | .433 |
| Cal State Northridge | 7 | – | 9 | .438 | 12 | – | 19 | .387 |
| Cal Poly | 6 | – | 10 | .375 | 11 | – | 18 | .379 |
| UC Riverside | 4 | – | 12 | .250 | 8 | – | 22 | .267 |
† 2020 Big West tournament winner As of March 12, 2025; Rankings from AP poll

The 2020 Big West Conference women's basketball tournament was the postseason women's basketball tournament that was scheduled to take place March 10–14, 2020, at two venues in the Los Angeles area. The first two rounds were scheduled for the Walter Pyramid in Long Beach, California, while the semifinals and championship were to be held at the Honda Center in Anaheim. The winner of the Big West tournament would have received the conference's automatic bid to the 2020 NCAA Division I women's basketball tournament. On March 10 it was announced the tournament will be played without spectators, in an effort to prevent the spread of the coronavirus. On March 12, the NCAA announced that the tournament was cancelled due to the coronavirus pandemic.

== Seeds ==
| Seed | School | Conference | Overall | Tiebreaker |
|---|---|---|---|---|
| 1 | UC Davis | 12–4 | 17–12 | |
| 2 | UC Santa Barbara | 9–7 | 14–15 | 2–0 vs. Irvine |
| 3 | UC Irvine | 9–7 | 13–17 | 1–1 vs. Hawaii |
| 4 | Hawaii | 9–7 | 15–14 | |
| 5 | Long Beach State | 8–8 | 13–16 | |
| 6 | Cal State Fullerton | 8–8 | 16–13 | |
| 7 | Cal State Northridge | 7–9 | 12–18 | |
| 8 | Cal Poly | 6–10 | 9–18 | |

== Schedule ==
| Session | Game | Time* | Matchup^{#} | Score | Television |
First round – Tuesday, March 10
| 1 | 1 | 6:00 PM | #5 Long Beach State vs. #8 Cal Poly | 48–59 | ESPN3 |
| 1 | 2 | 8:30 PM | #6 Cal State Fullerton vs. #7 Northridge | 67–52 | ESPN3 |
Quarterfinals – Wednesday, March 11
| 2 | 3 | 6:00 PM | #3 UC Irvine vs. #8 Cal Poly | 49–70 | ESPN3 |
| 2 | 4 | 8:30 PM | #4 Hawaii vs. #6 Cal State Fullerton | 72–59 | ESPN3 |
Semifinals – Friday, March 13
| 3 | 5 | | #1 UC Davis vs. #8 Cal Poly | Cancelled | |
| 3 | 6 | | #2 UC Santa Barbara vs. #4 Hawaii | Cancelled | |
Championship Game – Saturday, March 14
| 4 | 7 | | Game 5 winner vs. Game 6 winner | Cancelled | |
*Game Times in PT. #-Rankings denote tournament seeding.

== Bracket ==
First round March 10
5 | Long Beach State | 48
8 | Cal Poly | 59
6 | Cal State Fullerton | 67
7 | Cal State Northridge | 52

Quarterfinals; March 11
3 | UC Irvine | 49
8 | Cal Poly | 70
4 | Hawaii | 72
6 | Cal State Fullerton | 59

Semifinals; March 13

Championship; March 14
