= 2020 Big South Conference women's basketball tournament =

- Classification: Division I
- Season: 2019–20
- Teams: 11
- Site: Campus sites (first round) #1 and #2 seeds (quarterfinals and semifinals); Highest remaining seed (championship)

2019–20 Big South women's basketball standings
	Conf.				Overall
Team	W		L	PCT	W		L	PCT
Campbell	16	–	4	.800	21	–	8	.724
Radford	15	–	5	.750	17	–	12	.586
Hampton	14	–	6	.700	18	–	11	.621
High Point	14	–	6	.700	16	–	13	.552
Gardner-Webb	13	–	7	.650	18	–	11	.621
UNC Asheville	9	–	11	.450	15	–	14	.517
Longwood	8	–	12	.400	12	–	17	.414
Winthrop	8	–	12	.400	11	–	18	.379
Presbyterian	7	–	13	.350	11	–	18	.379
USC Upstate	4	–	16	.200	9	–	20	.310
Charleston Southern	2	–	18	.100	4	–	25	.138
† 2020 Big South tournament winner Rankings from AP poll

The 2020 Big South women's basketball tournament was the postseason women's basketball tournament that ended the 2019–20 season of the Big South Conference. It was scheduled be held from March 10 through March 15, 2020, at various campus sites. The winner would have received the conference's automatic bid to the NCAA tournament. On March 12, the NCAA announced that the tournament was cancelled due to the coronavirus pandemic.

== Sites ==
The first round was played at campus sites at the home of the higher seed. The quarterfinals and semifinals were played at #1 and #2 seeds. The championship game was held at the home arena of the higher surviving seed.

== Seeds ==
All 11 conference teams were eligible for the tournament. The top five teams received a first-round bye. Teams were seeded by record within the conference, with a tiebreaker system to seed teams with identical conference records.

Seed	School	Conference	Overall	Tiebreaker
1	Campbell‡	16–4	21–8	
2	Radford	15–5	17–12	
3	High Point	14–6	16–13	2–0 vs. Hampton
4	Hampton	14–6	18–11	
5	Gardner-Webb	13–7	18–11	
6	UNC Asheville	9–11	15–14	
7	Winthrop	8–12	11–18	2–0 vs. Longwood
8	Longwood	8–12	12–17	
9	Presbyterian	7–13	11–18	
10	USC Upstate	4–16	9–20	
11	Charleston-Southern	2–18	4–25	
‡ – Big South regular season champion. Overall records are as of the end of the regular season.

== Schedule ==
Game	Time*	Matchup^{#}	Television	Attendance
First round - Tuesday, March 10 Campus sites
1	7:00 pm	No. 9 Presbyterian 82 at No. 8 Longwood 73	ESPN3	
2	7:00 pm	No. 10 USC Upstate 60 at No. 7 Winthrop 57	ESPN3	
3	7:00 pm	No. 11 Charleston-Southern 46 at No. 6 UNC Asheville 82	ESPN3	
Quarterfinals - Thursday, March 12 at #1 and #2 seeds
4	cancelled	No. 9 Presbyterian vs. No. 1 Campbell	ESPN3	N/A
5	cancelled	No. 5 Gardner–Webb vs. No. 4 Hampton	ESPN3	N/A
6	cancelled	No. 10 USC Upstate vs. No. 2 Radford	ESPN3	N/A
7	cancelled	No. 6 UNC Asheville vs. No. 3 High Point	ESPN3	N/A
Semifinals - Friday, March 13 at #1 and #2 seeds
8	cancelled	Winner Game 5 vs. Winner Game 4	ESPN+	N/A
9	cancelled	Winner Game 7 vs. Winner Game 6	ESPN+	N/A
Championship - Sunday, March 15 at Highest Remaining Seed
10	cancelled	Winner Game 9 vs. Winner Game 8	ESPN+	N/A
*Game times in ET. Rankings denote tournament seeding.

== Bracket ==
First round Tuesday, March 10; ESPN3
8	Longwood	73
9	Presbyterian	82
7	Winthrop	57
10	USC Upstate	60
6	UNC Asheville	82
11	Charleston-Southern	46

Quarterfinals; Thursday, March 12; ESPN3
1	Campbell
9	Presbyterian
4	Hampton
5	Gardner–Webb
2	Radford
10	SC Upstate
3	High Point
6	UNC Asheville

Semifinals; Friday, March 13; ESPN+

Championship; Sunday, March 15; ESPN+

== See also ==
- 2020 Big South Conference men's basketball tournament
