= 2019–20 NCAA Division I women's basketball season =

American women's college basketball season

- Preseason AP No. 1: Oregon Ducks
- Regular season: November 2019 – March 2020
- NCAA Tournament: 2020
- Tournament dates: March 27 – April 5, 2020 (cancelled)
- National Championship: Smoothie King Center; New Orleans, Louisiana
- NCAA Champions: Not awarded
- Other champions: Not awarded (WNIT); Not awarded (WBI)
- Player of the Year (Naismith, Wooden): Sabrina Ionescu, Oregon Ducks

The 2019–20 NCAA Division I women's basketball season began in November 2019 and concluded prematurely on March 12, 2020, due to the COVID-19 pandemic. The 2020 NCAA Division I women's basketball tournament was scheduled to end at Smoothie King Center in New Orleans, Louisiana on April 5, 2020, but was ultimately canceled. All other postseason tournaments were canceled as well. It was the first cancellation in the history of the NCAA Division I women's basketball tournament. Practices officially began in late September 2019.

On December 31, 2020, South Carolina raised a banner recognizing a claim to a national championship for finishing first in the two major polls.

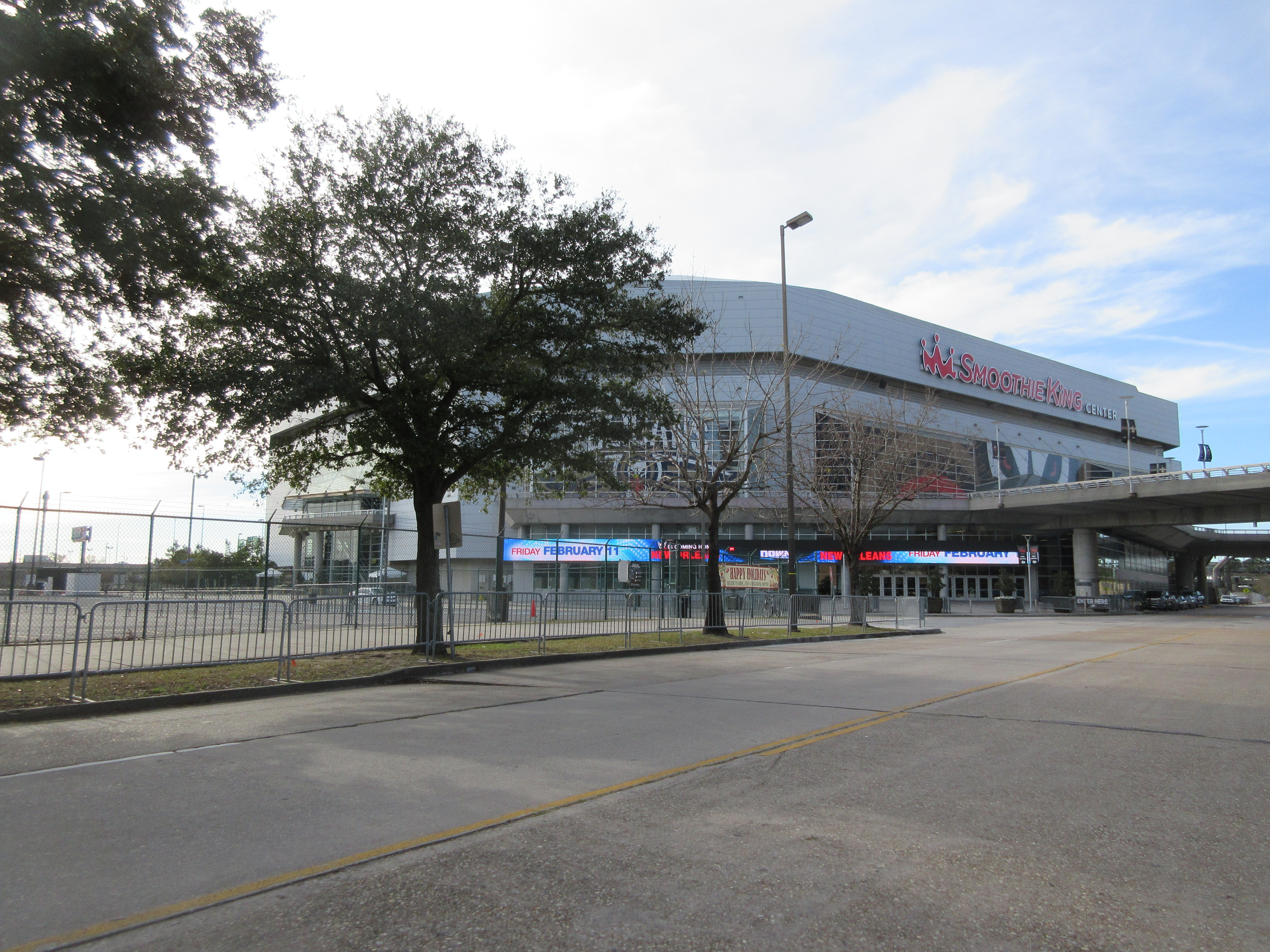
Smoothie King Center in New Orleans, Louisiana was planned to host the NCAA women's Final Four.

== Season headlines ==
- June 18 – The ASUN Conference officially announced that Bellarmine University, currently a member of the NCAA Division II Great Lakes Valley Conference, would move to Division I and join the ASUN effective with the 2020–21 school year.
- June 20 – The Summit League announced that the University of Missouri–Kansas City would return to the conference on July 1, 2020, after seven years in the Western Athletic Conference.
- June 21 – The Boston-area sports news website Digital Sports Desk reported that the University of Connecticut (UConn) was expected to announce by the end of the month that it would leave the American Athletic Conference to rejoin many of its former conference mates in the Big East Conference in 2020. The story was picked up by multiple national media outlets the next day.
- June 27 – The Big East and UConn jointly announced that the school would join the Big East; though the official announcements did not specify a time, it was expected that the Huskies would become members in 2020.
- July 26 – Multiple media reports indicated that UConn and The American had reached a buyout agreement that will lead to UConn joining the Big East in July 2020. The exit fee was reportedly $17 million.
- August 5 – The Horizon League announced that Purdue University Fort Wayne would leave the Summit League to join the Horizon League in July 2020.
- September 30
  - California governor Gavin Newsom signed the Fair Pay to Play Act into law, which upon taking effect in 2023 will prohibit public colleges and universities in the state from punishing their athletes for earning endorsement income. The bill places the state in direct conflict with the NCAA's current business model, which prohibits college athletes from receiving such income. At the time the bill was signed, several other states were proposing similar laws.
  - Officials at Tarleton State University, current members of the Division II Lone Star Conference, announced that the school had accepted an invitation to join the Western Athletic Conference. Full details, including the joining date, were expected to be revealed in the following days, but were delayed by more than a month.
- October 4 – Officials at the University of St. Thomas, a Minnesota school that will be expelled from its longtime athletic home of the NCAA Division III Minnesota Intercollegiate Athletic Conference (MIAC) in 2021, announced that the school had received an invitation to join the Summit League upon its MIAC departure. In order for St. Thomas to directly transition to the Summit, it must receive a waiver of an NCAA rule stating that Division III schools can only transition to Division II.
- October 29 – The NCAA board of governors voted unanimously to begin the process of changing institutional rules so that college athletes can profit from their names, images, and likenesses, while still maintaining a distinction between college and professional sports. The proposal calls for each of the three NCAA divisions to draft new rules consistent with this mandate, with a target date of January 2021.
- October 31 – The Associated Press preseason All-American team was released. Baylor center Lauren Cox and Oregon guard Sabrina Ionescu were unanimous selections (28 votes). Joining them on the team were Texas A&M guard Chennedy Carter (22 votes), Miami (FL) forward Beatrice Mompremier (20), and Maryland giard Kaila Charles (18). All were seniors except for Carter, a junior.
- November 5 – The first day of the regular season saw three players record triple-doubles, the most for a single day of play in NCAA history.
  - Aliyah Boston of South Carolina had 12 points, 12 rebounds, and 10 blocks in the Gamecocks' 103–43 rout of Alabama State. She became the first player ever to record a triple-double in her first career game.
  - Denia Davis-Stewart of Merrimack had 31 points, 13 rebounds, and 12 blocks in the Warriors' first game in NCAA Division I, a 79–64 win over UMass.
  - Chelsea Olson of Youngstown State had 13 points, 10 rebounds, and 11 assists in the Penguins' 87–59 win over Canisius.
- November 9 – Preseason #1 Oregon defeated the US national team 93–86 in an exhibition, led by Ionescu's 30 points. This marked the first time that Team USA had lost to college competition since a 1999 loss to Tennessee.
- November 12 – The Western Athletic Conference officially announced Tarleton State's entry into the league effective July 1, 2020.
- November 16 – Ionescu became the first NCAA player, regardless of division or sex, to record a triple-double in four different seasons. She had 10 points, 13 rebounds, and 14 assists in the Ducks' 99–63 win over Texas Southern, extending her record for career triple-doubles to 19.
- November 21 – Kamiyah Street, the starting point guard for Kennesaw State, was arrested and charged with murder in the July 16, 2019, shooting death of a man whose body was found in the parking deck of an Atlanta apartment complex. Street was immediately suspended once KSU was notified of the charge.
- November 25 – Sierra'Li Wade, a freshman guard for Arkansas–Pine Bluff who had yet to make her debut for the team, was killed in a shooting in her hometown of Lake Village, Arkansas.
- November 30 – The Atlantis Paradise Island resort in the Bahamas announced that the Battle 4 Atlantis, a prominent early-season Division I men's tournament held at the resort, would add a women's tournament starting next season. The women's tournament will feature eight teams (the same number as the men's version), and will be held immediately before the men's tournament.
- February 7 – The Big South Conference officially announced that North Carolina A&T State University would leave its longtime home of the Mid-Eastern Athletic Conference for the Big South effective with the 2021–22 school year.
- February 18 – The NCAA announced that it was considering a proposal that would allow student-athletes in all sports a one-time waiver to transfer to a new school without having to sit out a season. This would place all NCAA sports under the same transfer rules; currently, first-time transfers are only required to sit out a season in baseball, men's and women's basketball, football, and men's ice hockey. The existing criteria for the waiver would be extended to these five sports—namely, a player must receive a transfer release from his or her previous school, leave that school academically eligible, maintain academic progress at the new school, and not be under any disciplinary suspension.
- Responses to the COVID-19 pandemic:
  - March 10
    - The Big West Conference announced that its men's and women's conference tournaments, with women's play starting on March 10 at Walter Pyramid at California State University, Long Beach and men's play starting on March 12 at the Honda Center in Anaheim, California, would be closed to spectators.
    - The Ivy League canceled its 2020 men's and women's conference tournaments, both originally scheduled for March 14 and 15 at the Lavietes Pavilion on the campus of Harvard University. Regular-season champion Princeton was named the Ivy League's automatic qualifier for the NCAA Men's tournament.
    - The Mid-American Conference did not initially cancel its men's and women's tournaments, which had begun on March 9 with first-round games at campus sites, but announced that the remainder of both tournaments, to be held at Rocket Mortgage FieldHouse in Cleveland from March 11–14, would be held under what it called a "restricted attendance policy". The only individuals allowed to attend games will be credentialed institutional personnel, credentialed media and broadcast crews, team party members, and family members of players. The conference would ultimately cancel its tournament on March 12 (see below).
  - March 11
    - The NCAA announced that both the men's and women's entire NCAA tournaments would be conducted with "only essential staff and limited family attendance"
  - March 12
    - In the wake of the Rudy Gobert incident at an NBA game in Oklahoma City, all sporting events are terminated.
    - All Division I conference tournaments that had yet to be completed were canceled, even those in progress.
    - Some schools—most notably Duke and Kansas—suspended all athletic travel indefinitely.
    - The NCAA announced the decision to cancel both the men's and women's NCAA tournaments, as well as all championship events for the remainder of the 2019–20 academic year (including the NCAA Skiing Championships, then in progress).
  - March 16
    - The final Women's Basketball Coaches Association (Coaches' Poll) is released. South Carolina, Oregon, Baylor, and Maryland finish in the top four.
  - March 17
    - The final AP poll is released. South Carolina, Oregon, Baylor, and Connecticut finish in the top four.
  - December 31, 2020
    - At the start of Southeastern Conference play for the ensuing season, South Carolina raises a banner to recognise their mythical national championship. The banner is of the same size as the 2017 (and later 2022) NCAA championship banners and is located in the section for national championships.

=== Milestones and records ===
The following players reached the 2,000-point milestone during the season—Sabrina Ionescu and Ruthy Hebard, both of Oregon.

Ionescu and Hebard both reached the 1,000-rebound milestone during the season. Hebard reached this milestone in the same game in which Ionescu surpassed the 2,000-point mark. Ionescu reached the mark in Oregon's 74–66 win over Stanford on February 24, 2020, reaching two additional milestones during this game. She recorded her eighth triple-double of the season, tying her own record from last season for the most in a single season in NCAA history for either men or women. Ionescu also became the first player in NCAA basketball history with 2,000 points, 1,000 assists, and 1,000 rebounds in a career. She had previously joined Courtney Vandersloot of Gonzaga (2007–11) as the only Division I players with 2,000 points and 1,000 assists.

On December 18, Baylor guard Juicy Landrum set a new Division I women's record with 14 three-pointers in the Lady Bears' 111–43 rout of Arkansas State. This was more three-pointers than the Lady Bears had previously recorded as a team in a single game.

Four days later, Brittany Brewer of Texas Tech tied the Division I record for blocks in a game, recording 16 as part of a triple-double in the Lady Raiders' 83–38 rout of Louisiana–Monroe. Coincidentally, the previous record-holder, former TCU player Sandora Irvin, also reached that mark as part of a triple-double.

== Conference membership changes ==
Two schools joined new conferences for the 2019–20 season. Both moved between Division I and Division II, with one joining Division I and the other leaving Division I.

School	Former conference	New conference
Merrimack	Northeast-10 Conference (D-II)	Northeast Conference
Savannah State	Mid-Eastern Athletic Conference	Southern Intercollegiate Athletic Conference (D-II)

In addition, two existing Division I teams assumed new athletic identities.

After the 2018–19 school year, Long Island University (LIU) merged the athletic programs of its two main campuses—the Division I LIU Brooklyn Blackbirds and Division II LIU Post Pioneers—into a single program that now plays as the LIU Sharks. The Sharks inherited the Division I and Northeast Conference memberships of the Brooklyn campus, with some sports to be based in Brooklyn and others at the Post campus in Brookville, New York. Specific to basketball, LIU announced that the unified men's and women's teams in that sport would be based in Brooklyn.

On July 1, 2019, the University of Missouri–Kansas City (UMKC) announced that its athletic program, formerly known as the UMKC Kangaroos, would officially become the Kansas City Roos, with "Roos" having long been used as a short form of the former "Kangaroos" nickname.

== Arenas ==
=== New arenas ===
- Robert Morris moved into the new UPMC Events Center after playing last season at the Student Recreation and Fitness Center, a facility at the school's North Athletic Complex. The Colonials played their first game there in November 2019.

=== Arenas closing ===
- James Madison played its final season at the JMU Convocation Center, home to the Dukes since 1982. The final game at the arena on February 29 was a women's game in which the Dukes defeated Delaware 69–64. JMU opened Atlantic Union Bank Center for the 2020–21 season.
- This was Liberty's final season playing games full-time at the Vines Center, home to the Flames since 1990. The school opened the adjoining Liberty Arena, with less than half of the capacity at Vines Center, for the 2020–21 season. The Vines Center will continue to be used for games in which attendance is expected to exceed 4,000.
- This was intended to be High Point's final season at the Millis Athletic Convocation Center, home to the Panthers since 1992. They planned to open the new Nido Quebin Arena and Conference Center for the 2020–21 season. However, construction delays brought on by COVID-19 led High Point to delay the new arena's opening until 2021–22.

=== Temporary arenas ===
- Immediately after the 2018–19 season, Duquesne began an extensive renovation of the on-campus Palumbo Center. When the venue reopens, expected for the 2020–21 school year, it will be renamed UPMC Cooper Fieldhouse, via a partnership between the University of Pittsburgh Medical Center and the family foundation of late Duquesne star Chuck Cooper, the first African American selected in an NBA draft. At the time of announcement, the final capacity of the renovated venue had not been determined, but Duquesne's athletic director expected it to have about the same capacity as the pre-renovation Palumbo Center (4,390). Duquesne's temporary home venue had also not yet been announced, but it was expected that PPG Paints Arena would be used for at least some men's home games. Duquesne revealed its plans for the 2019–20 women's season in two phases, announcing its non-conference schedule on September 5, 2019 and its conference schedule on September 30. The following four venues will be used:
  - PPG Paints Arena will host two games. The first is the season opener; it will be the second leg of a doubleheader with the men's team. The second will be the opening leg of a doubleheader with the men.
  - One game will be at Donahue Pavilion on the campus of Oakland Catholic High School in Pittsburgh's Oakland neighborhood.
  - The bulk of the women's schedule, nine games in all, will be at the Kerr Fitness Center on the campus of La Roche University in the northern Pennsylvania suburb of McCandless.
  - The season finale will be at Robert Morris's new UPMC Events Center.

== Season outlook ==
=== Pre-season polls ===
The top 25 from the AP and USA Today Coaches Polls.

Associated Press
Ranking	Team
1	Oregon (25)
2	Baylor (3)
3	Stanford
4	Maryland
5	UConn
6	Texas A&M
7	Oregon State
8	South Carolina
9	Louisville
10	Mississippi State
11	UCLA
12	Florida State
13	Kentucky
14	NC State
15	Texas
16	Notre Dame
17	Michigan State
18	DePaul
18	Miami (FL)
20	Arizona State
21	Syracuse
22	Arkansas
23	Minnesota
24	Indiana
25	Michigan

USA Today Coaches
Ranking	Team
1	Oregon (24)
2	Baylor (8)
3	Stanford
4	UConn
5	Maryland
6	Oregon State
7	Texas A&M
8	Mississippi State
9	Louisville
10	South Carolina
11	UCLA
12	NC State
13	Florida State
14	Notre Dame
15	Texas
16	Kentucky
17	Syracuse
18	Arizona State
19	Miami (FL)
20	DePaul
21	Michigan State
22	Arkansas
23	Gonzaga
24	Michigan
24	Iowa State

== Regular season ==
=== Early season tournaments ===
Name	Dates	Location	No. teams	Champion
Preseason WNIT	November 8–17	Campus Sites	16	Oregon State
Cancún Challenge	November 28–30	Moon Palace Golf & Spa Resort (Cancún, Mexico)	10	Florida Gulf Coast
Junkanoo Jam	November 28–30	Gateway Christian Academy (Bimini, Bahamas)	10	LSU
Greater Victoria Invitational	November 28–30	University of Victoria (Saanich, British Columbia)	8	Stanford
Paradise Jam tournament	November 28–30	Sports and Fitness Center (Saint Thomas, VI)	8	Louisville (Island Division); Indiana/South Carolina (Reef Division)
Daytona Beach Invitational	November 29–30	Ocean Center (Daytona Beach, FL)	10	Georgia; Maryland
Gulf Coast Showcase	November 29–December 1	Hertz Arena (Estero, FL)	8	Gonzaga
West Palm Beach Invitational	December 19–21	Student Life Center (West Palm Beach, FL)	10	Wake Forest
Duel in the Desert	December 19–21	Cox Pavilion (Las Vegas, NV)	4	Mississippi State

=== Upsets ===
An upset is a victory by an underdog team. In the context of NCAA Division I Women's Basketball, this generally constitutes an unranked team defeating a team currently ranked in the Top 25. This list will highlight those upsets of ranked teams by unranked teams as well as upsets of #1 teams. Rankings are from the AP poll. Bold type indicates winning teams in "true road games"—i.e., those played on an opponent's home court (including secondary homes).

Winner	Score	Loser	Date	Tournament/Event
**Missouri State**	77–69	#23 Minnesota	November 5, 2019	
South Florida	64–57	#15 Texas	November 8, 2019	
**Tennessee**	74–63	#15 Notre Dame	November 11, 2019	
Minnesota	80–66	#19 Arizona State	November 17, 2019	
**Arizona**	83–58	#22 Texas	November 17, 2019	
**Notre Dame**	76–72	#21 Michigan	November 23, 2019	
California	84–80	#20 Arkansas	November 24, 2019	
South Dakota State	61–50	#21 South Florida	November 28, 2019	Cancún Challenge
Creighton	82–75	#23 West Virginia	November 28, 2019	Cancún Challenge
Florida Gulf Coast	81–77	#21 South Florida	November 29, 2019	Cancún Challenge
LSU	58–56	#15 Michigan State	November 29, 2019	Junkanoo Jam
Notre Dame	67–51	#21 South Florida	November 30, 2019	Cancún Challenge
#8 Louisville	72–62	#1 Oregon	November 30, 2019	Paradise Jam
Green Bay	79–73^{OT}	#18 Syracuse	November 30, 2019	Greater Victoria Invitational
Ohio State	67–60	#2 Louisville	December 5, 2019	ACC–Big Ten Women's Challenge
Oklahoma	90–68	#25 LSU	December 7, 2019	Big 12/SEC Women's Challenge
**West Virginia**	71–65	#10 Mississippi State	December 8, 2019	Big 12/SEC Women's Challenge
**Texas**	66–60	#17 Tennessee	December 8, 2019	Big 12/SEC Women's Challenge
Syracuse	77–63	#19 Michigan State	December 20, 2019	Florida Sunshine Classic
Texas	69–64	#1 Stanford	December 22, 2019	
**Ohio State**	66–63	#24 Minnesota	December 31, 2019	
Northwestern	81–58	#12 Maryland	December 31, 2019	
Syracuse	90–89^{OT}	#8 Florida State	January 2, 2020	
Georgia Tech	61–54	#23 Miami	January 2, 2020	
**TCU**	65–63	#25 Texas	January 3, 2020	
Nebraska	72–58	#24 Minnesota	January 4, 2020	
**#6 Baylor**	74–58	#1 UConn	January 9, 2020	
Ohio State	78–69	#24 Michigan	January 9, 2020	
North Carolina	66–60	#9 NC State	January 9, 2020	Rivalry
**Georgia Tech**	67–52	#11 Florida State	January 9, 2020	
Iowa	66–61	#17 Maryland	January 9, 2020	
**LSU**	57–54	#10 Texas A&M	January 9, 2020	
Arizona State	72–66	#2 Oregon	January 10, 2020	
Arizona State	55–47	#3 Oregon State	January 12, 2020	
Iowa	91–85^{2OT}	#12 Indiana	January 12, 2020	
**Oklahoma**	73–49	#17 West Virginia	January 15, 2019	
**Northwestern**	71–69^{OT}	#15 Indiana	January 16, 2020	
Southern Illinois	70–68	#19 Missouri State	January 17, 2020	
USC	70–68^{2OT}	#7 UCLA	January 17, 2020	Rivalry
LSU	65–59	#11 Kentucky	January 19, 2020	
**Oklahoma State**	57–55	#25 West Virginia	January 22, 2020	
**Georgia**	64–55	#21 Arkansas	January 23, 2020	
TCU	73–60	#25 West Virginia	January 26, 2020	
**Boston College**	65–56	#14 Florida State	January 30, 2020	
**Creighton**	63–61	#11 DePaul	January 31, 2020	
Michigan	78–63	#18 Iowa	February 2, 2020	
**Florida**	70–62	#13 Kentucky	February 2, 2020	
LSU	59–58	#15 Texas A&M	February 2, 2020	
Saint Mary's	70–60	#11 Gonzaga	February 8, 2020	
Syracuse	59–51	#5 Louisville	February 9, 2020	
LSU	75–65	#25 Tennessee	February 13, 2020	
USC	72–66	#11 Oregon State	February 14, 2020	
Duke	66–64	#14 Florida State	February 16, 2020	
**Georgia Tech**	65–61	#4 NC State	February 16, 2020	
**Ohio State**	80–76	#20 Indiana	February 16, 2020	
Villanova	76–58	#12 DePaul	February 23, 2020	
**Alabama**	66–64	#9 Mississippi State	February 23, 2020	
Colorado	50–38	#11 Arizona	February 23, 2020	
Washington	74–68	#8 UCLA	February 23, 2020	
Utah	75–71	#21 Arizona State	February 23, 2020	
Florida	83–80	#22 Arkansas	February 23, 2020	
Georgia Tech	65–62	#17 Florida State	February 23, 2020	
**Duke**	70–65	#8 NC State	February 24, 2020	Play4Kay
**Texas**	77–67	#25 TCU	February 26, 2020	
**Alabama**	76–63	#12 Texas A&M	February 27, 2020	
Illinois State	78–66	#21 Missouri State	February 27, 2020	
Rutgers	78–74^{OT}	#18 Iowa	March 1, 2020	
Texas Tech	87–83	#25 TCU	March 1, 2020	
Marquette	90–83	#16 DePaul	March 1, 2020	
Vanderbilt	70–64	#15 Kentucky	March 1, 2020	
**California**	55–54	#13 Arizona	March 1, 2020	
**Notre Dame**	70–67	#19 Florida State	March 1, 2020	
California	71–67	#24 Arizona State	March 5, 2020	Pac-12 Tournament
Michigan	67–59	#11 Northwestern	March 7, 2020	Big Ten tournament
Ohio State	87–66	#19 Iowa	March 7, 2020	Big Ten tournament
Iowa State	57–56	#2 Baylor	March 8, 2020	
Portland	70–69	#11 Gonzaga	March 9, 2020	WCC tournament

=== Conference winners and tournaments ===
Each of the 32 Division I athletic conferences ends its regular season with a single-elimination tournament. The team with the best regular-season record in each conference is given the number one seed in each tournament, with tiebreakers used as needed in the case of ties for the top seeding. The winners of these tournaments receive automatic invitations to the 2020 NCAA Division I women's basketball tournament.

Conference	Regular season first place	Conference player of the year	Conference Coach of the Year	Conference tournament	Tournament venue (city)	Tournament winner
America East Conference	Stony Brook	Kai Moon, Binghamton	Caroline McCombs, Stony Brook	2020 America East women's basketball tournament	Campus sites	Tournament canceled in progress due to coronavirus pandemic
American Athletic Conference	UConn	Megan Walker, UConn	Geno Auriemma, UConn	2020 American Athletic Conference women's basketball tournament	Mohegan Sun Arena (Uncasville, CT)	UConn
Atlantic 10 Conference	Dayton	Bre Cavanaugh, Fordham	Shauna Green, Dayton	2020 Atlantic 10 women's basketball tournament	First round: Campus sites Remainder: UD Arena (Dayton, OH)	Dayton
Atlantic Coast Conference	Louisville	Dana Evans, Louisville	Joanna Bernabei-McNamee, Boston College	2020 ACC women's basketball tournament	Greensboro Coliseum (Greensboro, NC)	NC State
Atlantic Sun Conference	Florida Gulf Coast	Keri Jewett-Giles, Florida Gulf Coast	Karl Smesko, Florida Gulf Coast	2020 ASUN women's basketball tournament	Campus sites	Tournament canceled in progress due to coronavirus pandemic
Big 12 Conference	Baylor	Lauren Cox, Baylor	Kim Mulkey, Baylor	2020 Big 12 Conference women's basketball tournament	Municipal Auditorium (Kansas City, MO)	Tournament canceled due to coronavirus pandemic
Big East Conference	DePaul	Jaylyn Agnew, Creighton	Megan Duffy, Marquette	2020 Big East women's basketball tournament	Wintrust Arena (Chicago, IL)	DePaul
Big Sky Conference	Montana State	Fallyn Freije, Montana State	Tricia Binford, Montana State	2020 Big Sky Conference women's basketball tournament	CenturyLink Arena (Boise, ID)	Tournament canceled due to coronavirus pandemic
Big South Conference	Campbell	Camryn Brown, High Point	Ronny Fisher, Campbell	2020 Big South Conference women's basketball tournament	First round: Campus sites Quarterfinals/semifinals: #1 seed Final: Top surviving seed	Tournament canceled in progress due to coronavirus pandemic
Big Ten Conference	Maryland (Note: Top seed in conference tournament.) and Northwestern	Kathleen Doyle, Iowa	Joe McKeown, Northwestern	2020 Big Ten Conference women's basketball tournament	Bankers Life Fieldhouse (Indianapolis, IN)	Maryland
Big West Conference	UC Davis	Raina Perez, Cal State Fullerton	Jennifer Gross, UC Davis	2020 Big West Conference women's basketball tournament	First round and quarterfinals: Walter Pyramid (Long Beach, CA); Semifinals and final: Honda Center (Anaheim, CA)	Tournament canceled in progress due to coronavirus pandemic
Colonial Athletic Association	Drexel and James Madison	Kamiah Smalls, James Madison	Denise Dillon, Drexel & Ed Swanson, William & Mary	2020 CAA women's basketball tournament	Schar Center (Elon, NC)	Tournament canceled in progress due to coronavirus pandemic
Conference USA	Rice	Erica Ogwumike, Rice	Nikki McCray, Old Dominion	2020 Conference USA women's basketball tournament	Ford Center (Frisco, TX)	Tournament canceled in progress due to coronavirus pandemic
Horizon League	IUPUI	Macee Williams, IUPUI	Austin Parkinson, IUPUI	2020 Horizon League women's basketball tournament	Quarterfinals: Campus sites Semifinals and final: Indiana Farmers Coliseum (Indianapolis, IN)	IUPUI
Ivy League	Princeton	Bella Alarie, Princeton	Carla Berube, Princeton	2020 Ivy League women's basketball tournament	Lavietes Pavilion (Boston, MA)	Tournament canceled due to coronavirus pandemic
Metro Atlantic Athletic Conference	Marist and Rider	Stella Johnson, Rider	Lynn Milligan, Rider	2020 MAAC women's basketball tournament	Boardwalk Hall (Atlantic City, NJ)	Tournament canceled in progress due to coronavirus pandemic
Mid-American Conference	Kent State (East); Central Michigan (West)	Micaela Kelly, Central Michigan	Heather Oesterle, Central Michigan	2020 Mid-American Conference women's basketball tournament	First round: Campus sites Remainder: Rocket Mortgage FieldHouse (Cleveland, OH)	Tournament canceled in progress due to coronavirus pandemic
Mid-Eastern Athletic Conference	Bethune–Cookman	Chanette Hicks, Norfolk State	Ed Davis, Morgan State	2020 MEAC women's basketball tournament	Norfolk Scope (Norfolk, VA)	Tournament canceled in progress due to coronavirus pandemic
Missouri Valley Conference	Missouri State	Becca Hittner, Drake	Amaka Agugua-Hamilton, Missouri State	2020 Missouri Valley Conference women's basketball tournament	TaxSlayer Center (Moline, IL)	Tournament canceled due to coronavirus pandemic
Mountain West Conference	Fresno State	Maddi Utti, Fresno State	Jaime White, Fresno State	2020 Mountain West Conference women's basketball tournament	Thomas & Mack Center (Paradise, NV)	Boise State
Northeast Conference	Robert Morris	Denia Davis-Stewart, Merrimack	Charlie Buscaglia, Robert Morris	2020 Northeast Conference women's basketball tournament	Campus sites	Tournament canceled in progress due to coronavirus pandemic
Ohio Valley Conference	Belmont and UT Martin	Chelsey Perry, UT Martin	Rekha Patterson, Southeast Missouri State	2020 Ohio Valley Conference women's basketball tournament	Ford Center (Evansville, IN)	Southeast Missouri State
Pac-12 Conference	Oregon	Sabrina Ionescu, Oregon	Kelly Graves, Oregon	2020 Pac-12 Conference women's basketball tournament	Mandalay Bay Events Center (Paradise, NV)	Oregon
Patriot League	Bucknell	Ellie Mack, Bucknell	Trevor Woodruff, Bucknell	2020 Patriot League women's basketball tournament	Campus sites	Tournament canceled in progress due to coronavirus pandemic
Southeastern Conference	South Carolina	Rhyne Howard, Kentucky	Dawn Staley, South Carolina	2020 SEC women's basketball tournament	Bon Secours Wellness Arena (Greenville, SC)	South Carolina
Southern Conference	Chattanooga, Samford and UNC Greensboro	Nadine Soliman, UNC Greensboro	Trina Patterson, UNC Greensboro (coaches & media); Carley Kuhns, Samford (media)	2020 Southern Conference women's basketball tournament	Harrah's Cherokee Center (Asheville, NC)	Samford
Southland Conference	Texas A&M–Corpus Christi	Breanna Wright, Abilene Christian	Royce Chadwick, Texas A&M–Corpus Christi	2020 Southland Conference women's basketball tournament	Leonard E. Merrell Center (Katy, TX)	Tournament canceled due to coronavirus pandemic
Southwestern Athletic Conference	Jackson State	Ciane Cryor, Texas Southern	Tomekia Reed, Jackson State	2020 SWAC women's basketball tournament	Quarterfinals: Campus sites Semifinals and final: Bartow Arena (Birmingham, AL)	Tournament canceled in progress due to coronavirus pandemic
Summit League	South Dakota	Ciara Duffy, South Dakota	Dawn Plitzuweit, South Dakota	2020 Summit League women's basketball tournament	Denny Sanford Premier Center (Sioux Falls, SD)	South Dakota
Sun Belt Conference	Coastal Carolina	DJ Williams, Coastal Carolina	Jaida Williams, Coastal Carolina	2020 Sun Belt Conference women's basketball tournament	First three rounds: Campus sites Semifinals and final: Smoothie King Center (New Orleans, LA)	Tournament canceled in progress due to coronavirus pandemic
West Coast Conference	Gonzaga	Jill Townsend, Gonzaga	Cindy Fisher, San Diego	2020 West Coast Conference women's basketball tournament	Orleans Arena (Paradise, NV)	Portland
Western Athletic Conference	Kansas City	Ericka Mattingly, Kansas City	Jacie Hoyt, Kansas City	2020 WAC women's basketball tournament	Orleans Arena (Paradise, NV)	Tournament canceled due to coronavirus pandemic

=== Statistical leaders ===
**Points per game**			**Rebounds per game**			**Assists per game**			**Steals per game**		
Player	School	PPG	Player	School	RPG	Player	School	APG	Player	School	SPG
Stella Johnson	Rider	24.8	Ila Lane	UC Santa Barbara	13.0	Sabrina Ionescu	Oregon	9.1	Stephanie Karcz	Loyola (MD)	5.17
Rhyne Howard	Kentucky	23.4	Natalie Kucowski	Lafayette	12.8	Jayde Christopher	Boise State	8.2	Chanette Hicks	Norfolk State	4.89
Chelsey Perry	UT Martin	23.1	Natasha Mack	Oklahoma State	12.5	Lauren Saiki	UC Irvine	6.9	Lashonda Monk	East Carolina	4.17
Dyaisha Fair	Buffalo	22.0	Ellie Harmeyer	Belmont	12.3	Tra'dayja Smith	Longwood	6.5	Ciani Cryor	Texas Southern	3.83
Micaela Kelly	Central Michigan	21.5	Rodjanae Wade	UNLV	11.8	Taja Cole	Virginia Tech	6.5	Cierra Hooks	Ohio	3.66

**Blocked shots per game**			**Field goal percentage**			**Three-point field goal percentage**			**Free throw percentage**		
Player	School	BPG	Player	School	FG%	Player	School	3FG%	Player	School	FT%
Sara Hamson	BYU	4.72	Ruthy Hebard	Oregon	.685	Madisen Parker	Bowling Green	.480	Jaylyn Agnew	Creighton	.950
Brittany Brewer	Texas Tech	4.38	Monika Czinano	Iowa	.679	Abi Scheid	Northwestern	.477	Ayzhiana Basallo	San Jose State	.925
Natasha Mack	Oklahoma State	3.56	Dariauna Lewis	Alabama A&M	.652	Chloe Wanink	Wofford	.474	Eva Hodgson	William & Mary	.912
Kate Cain	Nebraska	3.37	Sara Rhine	Drake	.650	Brynna Maxwell	Utah	.472	Brandi Bisping	Milwaukee	.908
Nancy Mulkey	Rice	3.21	Anisha George	North Texas	.646	Kelly Campbell	DePaul	.460	Alexa Willard	Missouri State	.906

== Conference standings ==
2019–20 America East Conference women's basketball standings
	Conf.				Overall
Team	W		L	PCT	W		L	PCT
Stony Brook	14	–	2	.875	28	–	3	.903
Maine	12	–	4	.750	16	–	14	.533
UMass Lowell	11	–	5	.688	15	–	14	.517
Binghamton	10	–	6	.625	21	–	8	.724
New Hampshire	7	–	9	.438	10	–	18	.357
Vermont	6	–	10	.375	12	–	17	.414
UMBC	6	–	10	.375	10	–	17	.370
Albany	5	–	11	.313	9	–	20	.310
Hartford	1	–	15	.063	1	–	28	.034
† 2020 America East tournament winner Rankings from AP poll

2019–20 American Athletic Conference women's basketball standings
	Conf.				Overall
Team	W		L	PCT	W		L	PCT
No. 5 UConn	16	–	0	1.000	26	–	3	.897
Cincinnati	11	–	5	.688	20	–	9	.690
UCF	11	–	5	.688	19	–	9	.679
South Florida	10	–	6	.625	18	–	12	.600
Tulane	8	–	8	.500	13	–	16	.448
Temple	7	–	9	.438	15	–	14	.517
Wichita State	7	–	9	.438	15	–	14	.517
SMU	7	–	9	.438	13	–	15	.464
East Carolina	6	–	10	.375	9	–	20	.310
Houston	5	–	11	.313	12	–	18	.400
Memphis	4	–	12	.250	13	–	16	.448
Tulsa	4	–	12	.250	9	–	20	.310
† 2020 AAC tournament winner As of March 4, 2020; Rankings from AP poll

2019–20 Atlantic 10 women's basketball standings
	Conf.				Overall
Team	W		L	PCT	W		L	PCT
Dayton†	15	–	1	.938	25	–	8	.758
VCU	13	–	3	.813	20	–	12	.625
Fordham	11	–	5	.688	21	–	10	.677
Duquesne	9	–	7	.563	20	–	11	.645
Massachusetts	9	–	7	.563	20	–	11	.645
Saint Louis	9	–	7	.563	19	–	13	.594
Davidson	8	–	8	.500	16	–	15	.516
George Washington	8	–	8	.500	14	–	16	.467
Richmond	7	–	9	.438	15	–	17	.469
La Salle	7	–	9	.438	13	–	17	.433
Rhode Island	6	–	10	.375	13	–	16	.448
St. Bonaventure	4	–	12	.250	7	–	23	.233
Saint Joseph's	3	–	13	.188	9	–	20	.310
George Mason	3	–	13	.188	9	–	21	.300
† 2020 A10 tournament winner Rankings from AP poll

2019–20 ACC women's basketball standings
	Conf.				Overall
Team	W		L	PCT	W		L	PCT
No. 6 Louisville	16	–	2	.889	28	–	4	.875
No. 8 NC State†	14	–	4	.778	28	–	4	.875
Duke	12	–	6	.667	18	–	12	.600
No. 18 Florida State	11	–	7	.611	24	–	8	.750
Virginia Tech	11	–	7	.611	21	–	9	.700
Boston College	11	–	7	.611	20	–	12	.625
Georgia Tech	10	–	8	.556	20	–	11	.645
Syracuse	9	–	9	.500	16	–	15	.516
Virginia	8	–	10	.444	13	–	17	.433
Notre Dame	8	–	10	.444	13	–	18	.419
Miami (FL)	7	–	11	.389	15	–	15	.500
North Carolina	7	–	11	.389	16	–	14	.533
Wake Forest	7	–	11	.389	16	–	16	.500
Clemson	3	–	15	.167	8	–	23	.258
Pittsburgh	1	–	17	.056	5	–	26	.161
† 2020 ACC tournament winner As of March 5, 2020; Rankings from AP poll

2019–20 ASUN women's basketball standings
	Conf.				Overall
Team	W		L	PCT	W		L	PCT
Florida Gulf Coast	15	–	1	.938	28	–	3	.903
North Alabama*	11	–	5	.688	20	–	8	.714
Liberty	11	–	5	.688	18	–	11	.621
Jacksonville	10	–	6	.625	18	–	11	.621
North Florida	8	–	8	.500	15	–	14	.517
Kennesaw State	6	–	10	.375	13	–	15	.464
Stetson	6	–	10	.375	12	–	17	.414
Lipscomb	4	–	12	.250	7	–	22	.241
NJIT	1	–	15	.063	4	–	25	.138
† 2020 ASUN Tournament winner * ineligible for the 2020 NCAA tournament due to transition period Rankings from AP poll

2019–20 Big East Conference women's basketball standings
	Conf.				Overall
Team	W		L	PCT	W		L	PCT
No. 15 DePaul	15	–	3	.833	28	–	5	.848
Marquette	13	–	5	.722	24	–	8	.750
Butler	11	–	7	.611	19	–	11	.633
Creighton	11	–	7	.611	19	–	11	.633
Seton Hall	11	–	7	.611	19	–	12	.613
St. John's	11	–	7	.611	19	–	12	.613
Villanova	11	–	7	.611	18	–	13	.581
Providence	3	–	15	.167	13	–	19	.406
Georgetown	2	–	16	.111	5	–	25	.167
Xavier	2	–	16	.111	3	–	27	.100
† 2020 Big East tournament winner As of April 1, 2020; Rankings from AP poll

2019–20 Big Sky women's basketball standings
	Conf.				Overall
Team	W		L	PCT	W		L	PCT
Montana State	17	–	1	.944	21	–	6	.778
Idaho	13	–	5	.722	18	–	9	.667
Idaho State	12	–	6	.667	16	–	11	.593
Northern Arizona	12	–	7	.632	15	–	13	.536
Montana	11	–	7	.611	16	–	11	.593
Southern Utah	10	–	8	.556	16	–	11	.593
Northern Colorado	8	–	10	.444	12	–	15	.444
Portland State	7	–	11	.389	13	–	15	.464
Sacramento State	6	–	13	.316	8	–	20	.286
Eastern Washington	3	–	15	.167	4	–	23	.148
Weber State	1	–	17	.056	3	–	24	.111
† 2020 Big Sky tournament winner Rankings from AP poll

2019–20 Big South women's basketball standings
	Conf.				Overall
Team	W		L	PCT	W		L	PCT
Campbell	16	–	4	.800	21	–	8	.724
Radford	15	–	5	.750	17	–	12	.586
Hampton	14	–	6	.700	18	–	11	.621
High Point	14	–	6	.700	16	–	13	.552
Gardner-Webb	13	–	7	.650	18	–	11	.621
UNC Asheville	9	–	11	.450	15	–	14	.517
Longwood	8	–	12	.400	12	–	17	.414
Winthrop	8	–	12	.400	11	–	18	.379
Presbyterian	7	–	13	.350	11	–	18	.379
USC Upstate	4	–	16	.200	9	–	20	.310
Charleston Southern	2	–	18	.100	4	–	25	.138
† 2020 Big South tournament winner Rankings from AP poll

2019–20 Big Ten women's basketball standings
	Conf.				Overall
Team	W		L	PCT	W		L	PCT
No. 4 Maryland†	16	–	2	.889	28	–	4	.875
No. 12 Northwestern	16	–	2	.889	26	–	4	.867
No. 21 Iowa	14	–	4	.778	23	–	7	.767
No. 20 Indiana	13	–	5	.722	24	–	8	.750
Rutgers	11	–	7	.611	22	–	9	.710
Ohio State	11	–	7	.611	21	–	12	.636
Michigan	10	–	8	.556	21	–	11	.656
Michigan State	9	–	9	.500	16	–	14	.533
Purdue	8	–	10	.444	18	–	14	.563
Nebraska	7	–	11	.389	17	–	13	.567
Minnesota	5	–	13	.278	16	–	15	.516
Wisconsin	3	–	15	.167	12	–	19	.387
Illinois	2	–	16	.111	11	–	19	.367
Penn State	1	–	17	.056	7	–	23	.233
† 2020 Big Ten tournament winner Rankings from AP poll

2019–20 Big 12 Conference women's basketball standings
	Conf.				Overall
Team	W		L	PCT	W		L	PCT
No. 3 Baylor	17	–	1	.944	28	–	2	.933
TCU	13	–	5	.722	22	–	7	.759
Texas	11	–	7	.611	19	–	11	.633
Iowa State	10	–	8	.556	18	–	11	.621
Kansas State	10	–	8	.556	16	–	13	.552
Texas Tech	7	–	11	.389	18	–	11	.621
West Virginia	7	–	11	.389	17	–	12	.586
Oklahoma State	6	–	12	.333	15	–	15	.500
Oklahoma	5	–	13	.278	12	–	18	.400
Kansas	4	–	14	.222	15	–	14	.517
† 2020 Big 12 tournament winner Rankings from AP poll

2019–20 Big West women's basketball standings
	Conf.				Overall
Team	W		L	PCT	W		L	PCT
UC Davis	12	–	4	.750	17	–	12	.586
Hawaii	9	–	7	.563	16	–	14	.533
UC Santa Barbara	9	–	7	.563	14	–	15	.483
UC Irvine	9	–	7	.563	13	–	18	.419
Cal State Fullerton	8	–	8	.500	17	–	14	.548
Long Beach State	8	–	8	.500	13	–	17	.433
Cal State Northridge	7	–	9	.438	12	–	19	.387
Cal Poly	6	–	10	.375	11	–	18	.379
UC Riverside	4	–	12	.250	8	–	22	.267
† 2020 Big West tournament winner Rankings from AP poll

2019–20 CAA women's basketball standings
	Conf.				Overall
Team	W		L	PCT	W		L	PCT
Drexel	16	–	2	.889	23	–	7	.767
James Madison	16	–	2	.889	25	–	4	.862
William & Mary	12	–	6	.667	21	–	8	.724
Towson	9	–	9	.500	14	–	15	.483
Northeastern	9	–	9	.500	13	–	16	.448
Elon	8	–	10	.444	12	–	17	.414
Delaware	8	–	10	.444	14	–	16	.467
Charleston	6	–	12	.333	13	–	17	.433
UNC Wilmington	6	–	12	.333	10	–	20	.333
Hofstra	0	–	18	.000	3	–	27	.100
† 2020 CAA tournament winner Rankings from AP poll

2019–20 Conference USA women's basketball standings
	Conf.				Overall
Team	W		L	PCT	W		L	PCT
Rice	16	–	2	.889	21	–	8	.724
Old Dominion	14	–	4	.778	24	–	6	.800
Western Kentucky	14	–	4	.778	22	–	7	.759
Middle Tennessee	13	–	5	.722	21	–	9	.700
UAB	12	–	6	.667	20	–	10	.667
Charlotte	11	–	7	.611	20	–	9	.690
UTEP	8	–	10	.444	15	–	14	.517
Southern Miss	7	–	11	.389	15	–	15	.500
Florida Atlantic	7	–	11	.389	13	–	16	.448
Marshall	7	–	11	.389	13	–	17	.433
Louisiana Tech	6	–	12	.333	14	–	15	.483
North Texas	6	–	12	.333	12	–	18	.400
FIU	3	–	15	.167	6	–	23	.207
UTSA	2	–	16	.111	6	–	23	.207
† 2020 C-USA Tournament winner Rankings from AP poll

2019–20 Horizon League women's basketball standings
	Conf.				Overall
Team	W		L	PCT	W		L	PCT
IUPUI†	15	–	3	.833	23	–	8	.742
Wright State	13	–	5	.722	19	–	12	.613
Green Bay	13	–	5	.722	19	–	13	.594
Northern Kentucky	12	–	6	.667	20	–	12	.625
Milwaukee	11	–	7	.611	15	–	16	.484
Cleveland State	9	–	9	.500	21	–	11	.656
Youngstown State	6	–	12	.333	13	–	17	.433
Oakland	6	–	12	.333	11	–	19	.367
Detroit Mercy	3	–	15	.167	3	–	27	.100
UIC	2	–	16	.111	3	–	27	.100
† 2020 Horizon League Tournament winner Rankings from AP poll

2019–20 Ivy League women's basketball standings
	Conf.				Overall
Team	W		L	PCT	W		L	PCT
No. 22 Princeton	14	–	0	1.000	26	–	1	.963
Penn	10	–	4	.714	20	–	7	.741
Yale	9	–	5	.643	18	–	8	.692
Columbia	8	–	6	.571	17	–	10	.630
Harvard	6	–	8	.429	15	–	12	.556
Dartmouth	4	–	10	.286	10	–	17	.370
Cornell	3	–	11	.214	10	–	16	.385
Brown	2	–	12	.143	8	–	19	.296
† 2020 Ivy League Tournament; Ivy League Tournament canceled due to COVID-19 pandemic winner Rankings from AP Poll

2019–20 MAAC women's basketball standings
	Conf.				Overall
Team	W		L	PCT	W		L	PCT
Marist	18	–	2	.900	26	–	4	.867
Rider	18	–	2	.900	26	–	4	.867
Fairfield	12	–	8	.600	16	–	14	.533
Manhattan	12	–	8	.600	15	–	14	.517
Quinnipiac	12	–	8	.600	15	–	14	.517
Siena	8	–	12	.400	11	–	20	.355
Iona	8	–	12	.400	9	–	21	.300
Niagara	7	–	13	.350	10	–	21	.323
Saint Peter's	6	–	14	.300	9	–	21	.300
Monmouth	5	–	15	.250	9	–	22	.290
Canisius	4	–	16	.200	5	–	25	.167
† 2020 MAAC tournament winner Rankings from AP poll

2019–20 Mid-American Conference women's basketball standings
	Conf.				Overall
Team	W		L	PCT	W		L	PCT
East
Kent State	11	–	7	.611	19	–	11	.633
Ohio	11	–	7	.611	19	–	11	.633
Buffalo	9	–	9	.500	19	–	12	.613
Akron	8	–	10	.444	15	–	15	.500
Miami (OH)	4	–	14	.222	11	–	20	.355
Bowling Green	3	–	15	.167	10	–	21	.323
West
Central Michigan	16	–	2	.889	23	–	7	.767
Ball State	13	–	5	.722	21	–	10	.677
Western Michigan	10	–	8	.556	18	–	13	.581
Eastern Michigan	9	–	9	.500	16	–	15	.516
Toledo	7	–	11	.389	14	–	17	.452
Northern Illinois	7	–	11	.389	11	–	19	.367
† 2020 MAC tournament winner Rankings from AP poll

2019–20 MEAC women's basketball standings
	Conf.				Overall
Team	W		L	PCT	W		L	PCT
Bethune–Cookman	15	–	1	.938	22	–	5	.815
Norfolk State	12	–	4	.750	18	–	11	.621
Morgan State	12	–	4	.750	16	–	13	.552
North Carolina A&T	11	–	5	.688	19	–	9	.679
North Carolina Central	9	–	7	.563	12	–	17	.414
Delaware State	8	–	8	.500	12	–	17	.414
Howard	7	–	9	.438	16	–	14	.533
Maryland–Eastern Shore	5	–	11	.313	9	–	21	.300
Florida A&M	4	–	12	.250	6	–	21	.222
Coppin State	3	–	13	.188	3	–	25	.107
South Carolina State	2	–	14	.125	3	–	27	.100
† 2020 MEAC tournament winner Rankings from AP poll

2019–20 Missouri Valley Conference women's basketball standings
	Conf.				Overall
Team	W		L	PCT	W		L	PCT
No. 23 Missouri State	16	–	2	.889	26	–	4	.867
Drake	14	–	4	.778	22	–	8	.733
Bradley	13	–	5	.722	22	–	7	.759
Illinois State	11	–	7	.611	19	–	10	.655
Northern Iowa	10	–	8	.556	18	–	11	.621
Valparaiso	9	–	9	.500	17	–	12	.586
Southern Illinois	8	–	10	.444	16	–	13	.552
Loyola	6	–	12	.333	15	–	14	.517
Indiana State	3	–	15	.167	5	–	25	.167
Evansville	0	–	18	.000	3	–	26	.103
† 2020 MVC tournament winner Rankings from AP poll

2019–20 Mountain West Conference women's basketball standings
	Conf.				Overall
Team	W		L	PCT	W		L	PCT
Fresno State	16	–	2	.889	24	–	6	.800
Boise State †	13	–	5	.722	22	–	9	.710
Wyoming	12	–	6	.667	16	–	11	.593
San Jose State	12	–	6	.667	19	–	11	.633
San Diego State	9	–	9	.500	14	–	17	.452
UNLV	9	–	9	.500	13	–	17	.433
Nevada	7	–	11	.389	15	–	16	.484
Air Force	7	–	11	.389	10	–	21	.323
New Mexico	6	–	12	.333	15	–	17	.469
Colorado State	6	–	12	.333	12	–	18	.400
Utah State	2	–	16	.111	8	–	22	.267
† 2020 MW Tournament winner Rankings from AP poll

2019–20 Northeast Conference women's basketball standings
	Conf.				Overall
Team	W		L	PCT	W		L	PCT
Robert Morris	17	–	1	.944	22	–	7	.759
Mount St. Mary's	14	–	4	.778	19	–	11	.633
Merrimack*	13	–	5	.722	20	–	9	.690
Fairleigh Dickinson	9	–	9	.500	12	–	17	.414
Sacred Heart	9	–	9	.500	12	–	17	.414
Saint Francis (PA)	9	–	9	.500	11	–	18	.379
Wagner	7	–	11	.389	11	–	18	.379
Bryant	7	–	11	.389	9	–	20	.310
LIU	7	–	11	.389	8	–	21	.276
St. Francis Brooklyn	4	–	14	.222	8	–	21	.276
Central Connecticut	3	–	15	.167	4	–	25	.138
† 2020 NEC tournament winner * Ineligible for NEC championship (reclassification from Division II); Rankings from AP poll

2019–20 Ohio Valley Conference women's basketball standings
	Conf.				Overall
Team	W		L	PCT	W		L	PCT
Belmont	16	–	2	.889	21	–	8	.724
UT Martin	16	–	2	.889	20	–	9	.690
Southeast Missouri State†	14	–	4	.778	22	–	7	.759
Eastern Illinois	12	–	6	.667	18	–	11	.621
Tennessee Tech	10	–	8	.556	17	–	12	.586
Jacksonville State	10	–	8	.556	14	–	15	.483
Austin Peay	9	–	9	.500	18	–	11	.621
Murray State	7	–	11	.389	14	–	15	.483
Morehead State	6	–	12	.333	10	–	20	.333
Eastern Kentucky	5	–	13	.278	11	–	18	.379
Tennessee State	2	–	16	.111	4	–	24	.143
SIU Edwardsville	1	–	17	.056	3	–	26	.103
† 2020 OVC tournament winner Rankings from AP poll

2019–20 Pac-12 Conference women's basketball standings
	Conf.				Overall
Team	W		L	PCT	W		L	PCT
No. 2 Oregon†	17	–	1	.944	31	–	2	.939
No. 10 UCLA	14	–	4	.778	26	–	5	.839
No. 7 Stanford	14	–	4	.778	27	–	6	.818
No. 13 Arizona	12	–	6	.667	24	–	7	.774
No. 14 Oregon State	10	–	8	.556	23	–	9	.719
No. 25 Arizona State	10	–	8	.556	20	–	11	.645
USC	8	–	10	.444	17	–	14	.548
Utah	6	–	12	.333	14	–	17	.452
Colorado	5	–	13	.278	16	–	14	.533
Washington	5	–	13	.278	13	–	17	.433
Washington State	4	–	14	.222	11	–	20	.355
California	3	–	15	.167	12	–	19	.387
† 2020 Pac-12 Tournament winner Rankings from AP poll

2019–20 Patriot League women's basketball standings
	Conf.				Overall
Team	W		L	PCT	W		L	PCT
Bucknell	15	–	2	.882	22	–	6	.786
Colgate	11	–	6	.647	19	–	9	.679
Boston University	11	–	6	.647	16	–	12	.571
Lafayette	11	–	6	.647	15	–	12	.556
Holy Cross	10	–	7	.588	17	–	11	.607
Lehigh	8	–	8	.500	16	–	11	.593
American	7	–	10	.412	11	–	16	.407
Loyola (MD)	5	–	11	.313	8	–	19	.296
Army	4	–	13	.235	8	–	20	.286
Navy	2	–	15	.118	7	–	21	.250
† 2020 Patriot League tournament winner Rankings from AP poll

2019–20 SEC women's basketball standings
	Conf.				Overall
Team	W		L	PCT	W		L	PCT
No. 1 South Carolina †	16	–	0	1.000	32	–	1	.970
No. 9 Mississippi State	13	–	3	.813	27	–	6	.818
No. 24 Arkansas	10	–	6	.625	24	–	8	.750
No. 16 Kentucky	10	–	6	.625	22	–	8	.733
No. 19 Texas A&M	10	–	6	.625	22	–	8	.733
Tennessee	10	–	6	.625	21	–	10	.677
LSU	9	–	7	.563	20	–	10	.667
Alabama	8	–	8	.500	18	–	12	.600
Georgia	7	–	9	.438	17	–	14	.548
Florida	6	–	10	.375	15	–	15	.500
Missouri	5	–	11	.313	9	–	22	.290
Vanderbilt	4	–	12	.250	14	–	16	.467
Auburn	4	–	12	.250	11	–	18	.379
Ole Miss	0	–	16	.000	7	–	23	.233
† 2020 SEC tournament winner Rankings from AP poll

2019–20 Southern Conference women's basketball standings
	Conf.				Overall
Team	W		L	PCT	W		L	PCT
UNC Greensboro	10	–	4	.714	21	–	8	.724
Samford†	10	–	4	.714	15	–	14	.517
Chattanooga	10	–	4	.714	11	–	17	.393
Furman	8	–	6	.571	12	–	11	.522
Wofford	8	–	6	.571	15	–	14	.517
East Tennessee State	4	–	10	.286	9	–	20	.310
Mercer	4	–	10	.286	7	–	22	.241
Western Carolina	2	–	12	.143	5	–	24	.172
† 2020 SoCon Tournament winner Rankings from AP poll

2019–20 Southland Conference women's basketball standings
	Conf.				Overall
Team	W		L	PCT	W		L	PCT
Texas A&M-CC	17	–	3	.850	23	–	7	.767
Abilene Christian	16	–	4	.800	24	–	5	.828
Stephen F. Austin	16	–	4	.800	23	–	6	.793
Sam Houston State	14	–	6	.700	19	–	10	.655
New Orleans	13	–	7	.650	17	–	12	.586
Incarnate Word	10	–	10	.500	14	–	15	.483
Nicholls	10	–	10	.500	13	–	16	.448
Central Arkansas	9	–	11	.450	13	–	16	.448
Southeastern Louisiana	9	–	11	.450	12	–	17	.414
Lamar	6	–	14	.300	10	–	19	.345
Houston Baptist	4	–	16	.200	8	–	21	.276
Northwestern State	4	–	16	.200	7	–	22	.241
McNeese State	2	–	18	.100	5	–	24	.172
† 2020 Southland tournament winner As of March 7, 2020; Rankings from AP poll

2019–20 SWAC women's basketball standings
	Conf.				Overall
Team	W		L	PCT	W		L	PCT
Jackson State	15	–	1	.938	17	–	9	.654
Texas Southern	13	–	3	.813	18	–	9	.667
Southern	11	–	5	.688	13	–	14	.481
Alabama A&M	10	–	6	.625	14	–	13	.519
Prairie View A&M	9	–	7	.563	12	–	16	.429
Alcorn State	8	–	8	.500	12	–	16	.429
Alabama State	6	–	9	.400	9	–	17	.346
Arkansas-Pine Bluff	5	–	12	.294	6	–	21	.222
Grambling State	3	–	13	.188	4	–	23	.148
Mississippi Valley State	1	–	16	.059	2	–	26	.071
† 2020 SWAC tournament winner Rankings from AP poll

2019–20 Summit League women's basketball standings
	Conf.				Overall
Team	W		L	PCT	W		L	PCT
No. 17 South Dakota †	16	–	0	1.000	28	–	2	.933
South Dakota State	13	–	3	.813	22	–	9	.710
Denver	9	–	7	.563	15	–	15	.500
Western Illinois	9	–	7	.563	15	–	15	.500
Oral Roberts	9	–	7	.563	15	–	15	.500
North Dakota State	7	–	9	.438	11	–	18	.379
North Dakota	6	–	10	.375	15	–	15	.500
Omaha	2	–	14	.125	7	–	23	.233
Purdue Fort Wayne	1	–	15	.063	5	–	24	.172
† 2020 Summit League tournament winner Rankings from AP poll

2019–20 Sun Belt Conference women's basketball standings
	Conf.				Overall
Team	W		L	PCT	W		L	PCT
Troy*	16	–	2	.889	25	–	4	.862
Coastal Carolina	15	–	3	.833	25	–	4	.862
UT Arlington	14	–	4	.778	21	–	11	.656
Louisiana	10	–	8	.556	19	–	12	.613
South Alabama	9	–	9	.500	16	–	16	.500
Little Rock	9	–	9	.500	12	–	19	.387
Arkansas State	8	–	10	.444	12	–	18	.400
Appalachian State	8	–	10	.444	11	–	19	.367
Georgia Southern	7	–	11	.389	10	–	19	.345
Texas State	6	–	12	.333	13	–	17	.433
Georgia State	5	–	13	.278	8	–	21	.276
Louisiana–Monroe	1	–	17	.056	3	–	26	.103
† 2020 Sun Belt tournament winner

2019–20 WAC women's basketball standings
	Conf.				Overall
Team	W		L	PCT	W		L	PCT
Kansas City	12	–	3	.800	19	–	10	.655
Grand Canyon	10	–	5	.667	15	–	11	.577
Utah Valley	9	–	6	.600	12	–	15	.444
UTRGV	8	–	7	.533	13	–	15	.464
New Mexico State	8	–	8	.500	11	–	18	.379
Cal State Bakersfield	7	–	8	.467	15	–	13	.536
Seattle	6	–	8	.429	12	–	15	.444
California Baptist*	6	–	9	.400	15	–	15	.500
Chicago State	1	–	13	.071	1	–	26	.037
† 2020 WAC tournament winner Rankings from AP poll *ineligible for the 2020 NCAA tournament due to transition period

2019–20 West Coast Conference women's basketball standings
	Conf.				Overall
Team	W		L	PCT	W		L	PCT
No. 11 Gonzaga	17	–	1	.944	28	–	3	.903
San Diego	13	–	5	.722	20	–	11	.645
BYU	13	–	5	.722	18	–	11	.621
Portland †	11	–	7	.611	21	–	11	.656
Pacific	9	–	9	.500	17	–	14	.548
Pepperdine	8	–	10	.444	16	–	15	.516
Saint Mary's	6	–	12	.333	12	–	19	.387
San Francisco	5	–	13	.278	12	–	19	.387
Santa Clara	5	–	13	.278	12	–	19	.387
Loyola Marymount	3	–	15	.167	7	–	25	.219
† 2020 WCC tournament winner Rankings from AP poll

== Award winners ==
=== All-America teams ===
The NCAA has never recognized a consensus All-America team in women's basketball. This differs from the practice in men's basketball, in which the NCAA uses a combination of selections by the Associated Press (AP), the National Association of Basketball Coaches (NABC), the Sporting News, and the United States Basketball Writers Association (USBWA) to determine a consensus All-America team. The selection of a consensus team is possible because all four organizations select at least a first and second team, with only the USBWA not selecting a third team.

Before the 2017–18 season, it was impossible for a consensus women's All-America team to be determined because the AP had been the only body that divided its women's selections into separate teams. The USBWA first named separate teams in 2017–18. The women's counterpart to the NABC, the Women's Basketball Coaches Association (WBCA), continues the USBWA's former practice of selecting a single 10-member (plus ties) team. The NCAA does not recognize Sporting News as an All-America selector in women's basketball.

=== Major player of the year awards ===
- Wooden Award: Sabrina Ionescu, Oregon
- Naismith Award: Sabrina Ionescu, Oregon
- Associated Press Player of the Year: Sabrina Ionescu, Oregon
- Wade Trophy: Sabrina Ionescu, Oregon
- Ann Meyers Drysdale Women's Player of the Year (USBWA): Sabrina Ionescu, Oregon
- espnW National Player of the Year: Sabrina Ionescu, Oregon

=== Major freshman of the year awards ===
- Tamika Catchings Award (USBWA): Aliyah Boston, South Carolina
- WBCA Freshman of the Year: Aliyah Boston, South Carolina
- espnW Freshman of the Year: Aliyah Boston, South Carolina

=== Major coach of the year awards ===
- Associated Press Coach of the Year: Dawn Staley, South Carolina
- Naismith College Coach of the Year: Dawn Staley, South Carolina
- USBWA National Coach of the Year: Dawn Staley, South Carolina
- WBCA National Coach of the Year: Dawn Staley, South Carolina
- espnW Coach of the Year: Dawn Staley, South Carolina

=== Other major awards ===
- Naismith Starting Five:
  - Nancy Lieberman Award (top point guard): Sabrina Ionescu, Oregon
  - Ann Meyers Drysdale Award (top shooting guard): Aari McDonald, Arizona
  - Cheryl Miller Award (top small forward): Satou Sabally, Oregon
  - Katrina McClain Award (top power forward): Ruthy Hebard, Oregon
  - Lisa Leslie Award (top center): Aliyah Boston, South Carolina
- WBCA Defensive Player of the Year: DiDi Richards, Baylor
- Naismith Women's Defensive Player of the Year: DiDi Richards, Baylor
- Becky Hammon Mid-Major Player of the Year Award (inaugural award): Ciara Duffy, South Dakota
- Senior CLASS Award (top senior on and off the court): Sabrina Ionescu, Oregon
- Maggie Dixon Award (top rookie head coach): Amaka Agugua-Hamilton, Missouri State
- Academic All-American of the Year (top scholar-athlete): Brittany Brewer, Texas Tech
- Elite 90 Award (top GPA among upperclass players at Final Four): Not presented due to cancellation of the NCAA tournament
- Pat Summitt Most Courageous Award: Lauren Cox, Baylor player (along with her sister Whitney, a player at Division II Lubbock Christian)

== Coaching changes ==
Several teams changed coaches during and after the season.

Team	Former coach	Interim coach	New coach	Reason
Alcorn State	Courtney Pruitt		Nate Kilbert	Pruitt's contract was not renewed on March 23, ending her 5-year tenure at Alcorn State with a 49–102 overall record. Former Mississippi Valley State and Arkansas Pine-Bluff coach Kilbert, who was an assistant at Alcorn State from 2001 to 2011, was named the new head coach of the Lady Braves on May 5.
Brown	Sarah Behn		Monique LeBlanc	Behn announced her resignation from Brown on March 23 after 6 seasons and a 74–96 overall record. On April 10, the Bears hired Merrimack head coach LeBlanc for the position.
Cal State Northridge	Jason Flowers	Lindsey Foster		Flowers announced his resignation from CSUN on April 21 after 11 seasons, leaving as the program's winningest coach with 150 wins. His top assistant, Foster, was named as interim head coach.
Chicago State	Misty Opat		Tiffany Sardin	Opat announced her resignation on April 16 after 2 seasons at Chicago State. Longwood associate head coach and recruiting coordinator Sardin was hired by the Cougars on May 15.
Coppin State	Dewayne Burroughs		Laura Harper	Coppin State parted ways with Burroughs on March 31 after 4 seasons and a 22–95 overall record. High Point assistant coach Harper was named the new head coach of the Eagles on July 20.
Denver	Jim Turgeon		Doshia Woods	Denver announced on June 16 that Turgeon, who had been placed on administrative leave since January, will not return after 2½ seasons with the team. On July 22, The Pioneers hired Tulane assistant coach Woods for the open job.
Detroit Mercy	Bernard Scott		AnnMarie Gilbert	Scott was fired on March 19 after 5 seasons and a 42–109 overall record at UDM. On April 24, the Titans hired Gilbert from D-II Virginia Union as their new head coach.
Drexel	Denise Dillon		Amy Mallon	Dillon left Drexel on March 27 after 17 seasons for the head coaching job at her alma mater Villanova. Not long after Dillon's departure, the Dragons promoted longtime assistant coach Mallon to the head coaching position.
Duke	Joanne P. McCallie		Kara Lawson	On July 2, Joanne P. McCallie stepped down as Duke head coach following 13 seasons. On July 11, Boston Celtics assistant Kara Lawson was hired.
Florida A&M	Kevin Lynum		Shalon Pillow	9 months after having the interim tag removed and being named new head coach, FAMU parted ways with Lynum on April 22 following a 6–21 record this season. Middle Tennessee assistant coach Shalon Pillow was hired as the new head coach of the Lady Rattlers on May 28.
FIU	Tiara Malcom		Jesyka Burks-Wiley	On April 17, South Florida assistant coach Jesyka Burks-Wiley was named the new head coach at FIU, replacing Tiara Malcom after 4 seasons.
Grand Canyon	Nicole Powell		Molly Miller	Powell left GCU on March 30 after three seasons for the head coaching job at UC Riverside. On April 8, the Antelopes hired Miller from D-II Drury University as their new head coach.
Merrimack	Monique LeBlanc		Kelly Morrone	LeBlanc left Merrimack on April 10 after 9 seasons for the head coaching job at Brown. On July 23, the Warriors hired Morrone from Division III John Carroll as their new head coach.
Mississippi State	Vic Schaefer		Nikki McCray-Penson	On April 5, Texas hired Vic Schaefer away from Mississippi State following 8 seasons with the Bulldogs. On April 9, Old Dominion head coach Nikki McCray-Penson was hired following 3 seasons as the Lady Monarchs' head coach.
Montana	Shannon Schweyen	Mike Petrino	Brian Holsinger	Montana parted ways with Schweyen on April 1, 2020, after 4 seasons and a 52–69 overall record. Assistant head coach Petrino was named interim head coach of the Lady Griz for the 2020–21 season. After the season ended, Oregon State assistant coach Brian Holsinger was hired on April 13, 2021.
Navy	Stefanie Pemper		Tim Taylor	Pemper was fired on March 10 after 12 seasons at the Naval Academy, leaving as the program's winningest coach with 214 wins. North Carolina asst. Tim Taylor, who previously spent 3 different stints as an asst. at the University of Virginia, was hired as head coach of the Midshipmen on April 28.
New Hampshire	Maureen Magarity	Kelsey Hogan		Magarity left New Hampshire on April 14 after 10 seasons for the Holy Cross head coaching position. UNH initially named associate head coach Hogan, who had been on the Wildcats staff since she completed her playing career with the team in 2014, as interim head coach the following day, and had the interim tag removed on August 10.
North Dakota	Travis Brewster	Mallory Bernhard		North Dakota's athletic director announced on March 11, 2020, that Brewster will not return as head coach after 9 seasons at UND, in which the Fighting Hawks went 128–120 overall. Associate head coach Bernhard initially served as the interim head coach for the 2020–21 season, and had the interim tag removed on March 17, 2021, and was officially named the new head coach.
Northwestern State	Jordan Dupuy	Aaron Swinson	Anna Nimz	Dupuy announced his resignation from Northwestern State on January 26 after 3½ seasons. During his tenure, the Lady Demons went 36–60, including a 5–13 overall record and 2–7 record in conference play at the time of his resignation. Assistant coach Swinson served as the team's interim head coach for the rest of the season. On March 18, the school initially hired Missy Bilderback from Jones College of the NJCAA as their new head coach, but on April 6, Bilderback backed out and returned to Jones College. The school would then hire UT Rio Grand Valley associate head coach Nimz on April 11.
Notre Dame	Muffet McGraw		Niele Ivey	McGraw retired on April 22 after 33 years at Notre Dame. Following the announcement, former Fighting Irish player and Memphis Grizzlies assistant Niele Ivey was hired.
Old Dominion	Nikki McCray-Penson		DeLisha Milton-Jones	McCray-Penson left for the Mississippi State vacancy on April 9 after 3 seasons as the Lady Monarchs' head coach. On April 17, ODU hired Syracuse assistant Milton-Jones.
Omaha	Brittany Lange		Carrie Banks	Lange's contract with Omaha was not renewed on March 9, ending her 7-year tenure at the school with an 80–124 overall record. Ohio State assistant coach Banks was named the new head coach of the Mavericks on April 8.
Tennessee State	Jessica Kern		Ty Evans	Kern initially took a temporary leave from Tennessee State on December 6, but announced her resignation from TSU sometime after the season was over. Auburn associate head coach Evans was named the new head coach of the Lady Tigers on August 19.
Texas	Karen Aston		Vic Schaefer	Aston was dismissed on April 3 despite a 184–83 overall record in eight seasons, including four straight Sweet Sixteen appearances from 2015 to 2018; however, the Longhorns went 1–18 against Baylor during her tenure. On April 5, Texas hired Vic Schaefer away from Mississippi State following 8 seasons with the Bulldogs.
Texas Tech	Marlene Stollings		Krista Gerlich	Texas Tech fired Stollings on August 6 after 2 seasons following allegations of player abuse in the program. On August 18, UT Arlington head coach and former Lady Raider star player Gerlich was named the new head coach of the team.
UC Riverside	John Margaritis	Seyram Bell	Nicole Powell	Margartis announced his resignation on September 13 after 15 seasons at UC Riverside, a day after being placed on unpaid leave when the school launched an investigation into accusations of emotional and verbal abuse by current and former UC Riverside players against him. Assistant coach Bell was named interim head coach of the Highlanders for the 2019–20 season. On March 30, the school hired Grand Canyon head coach Nicole Powell.
UNC Asheville	Brenda Mock Kirkpatrick		Honey Brown	Mock Kirkpatrick announced her resignation from UNC Asheville on April 7 after 8 seasons and a 117–137 overall record. Almost immediately after Mock Kirkpatrick's resignation, the Bulldogs promoted associate head coach Brown to fill the vacancy.
UNLV	Kathy Olivier		Lindy La Rocque	Olivier announced her resignation on March 6 after 12 seasons at her alma mater, finishing with a 182–193 overall record with only one postseason tournament appearance. On March 18, Stanford assistant coach and Las Vegas native La Racque was named the new head coach of the Lady Rebels.
USC Upstate	Tammy George		Becky Burke	George resigned on May 9 after 15 seasons at USC Upstate, leaving as the program's winningest coach with 193 wins. The Spartans went to the Division II ranks for their next hire, naming University of Charleston head coach Burke as their new head coach on June 8.
UT Arlington	Krista Gerlich		Shereka Wright	Gerlich left UTA on August 18 after 7 seasons for the head coaching job at her alma mater Texas Tech. On September 4, Vanderbilt associate head coach Wright was named the new head coach of the Mavericks.
Utah State	Jerry Finkbeiner	Ben Finkbeiner	Kayla Ard	The elder Finkbeiner, who had been on a medical leave of absence since early November, announced on November 25 that he was stepping down from his head coaching position after 7 seasons at Utah State. His son Ben, the Aggies associate head coach, was named interim head coach for the rest of the season. Denver assistant coach and recruiting coordinator Ard was named Utah State's new head coach on March 23.
Villanova	Harry Perretta		Denise Dillon	The then 64-year-old Perretta announced on October 30 that he would retire at the end of the 2019–20 season. His 42 seasons as the Wildcats' head coach tie him with Yvonne Kaufmann, who coached at Division III Elizabethtown from 1971 to 2012, for the most at a single school in NCAA women's history (including seasons in which women's sports were governed by the AIAW). On March 27, the Wildcats hired Villanova alum Denise Dillon from nearby Drexel as their new head coach.
Winthrop	Lynette Woodard	Semeka Randall-Lay		Woodard was relieved of her head coaching duties on March 24 after 3 seasons at Winthrop, in which the Eagles went 24–70 overall. Associate head coach Randall was named interim head coach of the Eagles for the 2020-21 season. Her interim tag was removed on April 8, 2021, when she was named head coach following the 2020–21 season.

== See also ==
- 2019–20 NCAA Division I men's basketball season
