= 2020 WAC women's basketball tournament =

- Classification: Division I
- Season: 2019–20
- Teams: 8
- Site: Orleans Arena; Paradise, Nevada

2019–20 WAC women's basketball standings
	Conf.				Overall
Team	W		L	PCT	W		L	PCT
Kansas City	12	–	3	.800	19	–	10	.655
Grand Canyon	10	–	5	.667	15	–	11	.577
Utah Valley	9	–	6	.600	12	–	15	.444
UTRGV	8	–	7	.533	13	–	15	.464
New Mexico State	8	–	8	.500	11	–	18	.379
Cal State Bakersfield	7	–	8	.467	15	–	13	.536
Seattle	6	–	8	.429	12	–	15	.444
California Baptist*	6	–	9	.400	15	–	15	.500
Chicago State	1	–	13	.071	1	–	26	.037
† 2020 WAC tournament winner Rankings from AP poll *ineligible for the 2020 NCAA tournament due to transition period

The 2020 WAC women's basketball tournament was a postseason women's basketball tournament for the Western Athletic Conference during the 2019–20 season. All tournament games were set to play at the Orleans Arena in Paradise, Nevada, from March 11–14, 2020. The tournament champion would have received the WAC's automatic bid to the 2020 NCAA women's tournament.

== Seeds ==
Eight of the 9 teams in the WAC are eligible to compete in the conference tournament. California Baptist is ineligible due to their transition from Division II to Division I. Teams will be seeded by record within the conference, with a tiebreaker system to seed teams with identical conference records.

Seed	School	Conference	Tiebreaker	Tiebreaker 2
1	Kansas City	13–3		
2	Utah Valley	9–6		
3	Grand Canyon	10–6		
4	UT Rio Grande	8–8		
5	New Mexico State	8–8		
6	CSU Bakersfield	8–8		
7	Seattle	6–9		
8	Chicago State	1–13		

== Schedule and results ==
Game	Time	Matchup	Score	Television
Quarterfinals – Wednesday March 11
1	Noon	No. 1 Kansas City vs No. 8 Chicago State	86–52	ESPN+
2	2:30 pm	No. 4 UT Rio Grande vs. No. 5 New Mexico State	61–73	ESPN+
3	6:00 pm	No. 2 Utah Valley vs. No. 7 Seattle	48–61	ESPN+
Quarterfinals – Thursday March 12
4	9:30 am	No. 3 Grand Canyon vs. No. 6 Bakersfield	cancelled	ESPN+
Semifinals – Friday, March 13
5	Noon	No. 1 Kansas City vs. No. 5 New Mexico State	cancelled	
6	2:30 pm	No. 7 Seattle vs. Game 4 winner	cancelled	
Final – Saturday, March 14
7	2:00 pm	Game 5 winner vs. Game 6 winner	cancelled	
Game times in PDT. Rankings denote tournament seed.

== Bracket ==
Quarterfinals; March 11/12; ESPN+
1	Kansas City	86
8	Chicago State	52
4	UT Rio Grande	61
5	New Mexico State	73
2	Utah Valley	48
7	Seattle	61
3	Grand Canyon
6	Bakersfield

Semifinals; March 13
1	UMKC
5	New Mexico State
7	Seattle

Championship; March 14
