= 2020 Horizon League women's basketball tournament =

- Classification: Division I
- Season: 2019–20
- Teams: 10
- Site: Campus sites (first round); Indiana Farmers Coliseum (semifinals and Finals); Indianapolis, Indiana
- Champions: IUPUI (1st title)
- Winning coach: Austin Parkinson (1st title)
- MVP: Holly Hoopingarner (IUPUI)
- Television: ESPN+, ESPNU

2019–20 Horizon League women's basketball standings
	Conf.				Overall
Team	W		L	PCT	W		L	PCT
IUPUI†	15	–	3	.833	23	–	8	.742
Wright State	13	–	5	.722	19	–	12	.613
Green Bay	13	–	5	.722	19	–	13	.594
Northern Kentucky	12	–	6	.667	20	–	12	.625
Milwaukee	11	–	7	.611	15	–	16	.484
Cleveland State	9	–	9	.500	21	–	11	.656
Youngstown State	6	–	12	.333	13	–	17	.433
Oakland	6	–	12	.333	11	–	19	.367
Detroit Mercy	3	–	15	.167	3	–	27	.100
UIC	2	–	16	.111	3	–	27	.100
† 2020 Horizon League Tournament winner Rankings from AP poll

The 2020 Horizon League women's basketball tournament is the postseason women's basketball tournament for the Horizon League. It was held March 3 through March 10, 2020. The winner, IUPUI, earned the conference's automatic berth into the 2020 NCAA women's tournament, but the tournament was cancelled due to the COVID-19 pandemic.

== Seeds ==
All ten teams participated in the tournament. Teams were seeded by record within the conference, with a tiebreaker system to seed teams with identical conference records.

Seed	School	Conference record	Overall record	Tiebreaker
1	IUPUI	15–3	21–8	
2	Green Bay	13–5	18–11	1–1 vs. IUPUI
3	Wright State	13–5	21–8	0–2 vs. IUPUI
4	Northern Kentucky	12–6	18–11	
5	Milwaukee	11–7	14–15	
6	Cleveland State	9–9	19–10	
7	Youngstown State	6–12	13–16	1–1 vs. IUPUI
8	Oakland	6–12	11–18	0–2 vs. IUPUI
9	Detroit Mercy	3–15	3–26	
10	UIC	2–16	3–26	

== Schedule ==
Game	Time	Matchup	Score	Television
First round – Tuesday, March 3
1	7:00 pm	No. 10 UIC at No. 3 Wright State	47–83	ESPN+
2	7:00 pm	No. 9 Detroit Mercy at No. 4 Northern Kentucky	47–94	ESPN+
3	7:00 pm	No. 7 Youngstown State at No. 6 Cleveland State	48–84	ESPN+
4	8:00 pm	No. 8 Oakland at No. 5 Milwaukee	65–73	ESPN+
Quarterfinals – Thursday, March 5
5	7:00 pm	No. 6 Cleveland State at No. 3 Wright State	63–52	ESPN+
6	7:00 pm	No. 5 Milwaukee at No. 4 Northern Kentucky	58–78	ESPN+
Semifinals – Monday, March 9
7	12:00 pm	No. 6 Cleveland State vs. No. 1 IUPUI	54–71	ESPN+
8	2:30 pm	No. 4 Northern Kentucky vs. No. 2 Green Bay	49–50	ESPN+
Finals – Tuesday, March 10
9	12:00 pm	No. 1 IUPUI vs. No. 2 Green Bay	51–37	ESPNU
All game times in Eastern Time Zone. Rankings denote tournament seed

== Bracket ==
First round Tuesday, March 3
3	Wright State	83
10	UIC	47
4	Northern Kentucky	94
9	Detroit Mercy	47
5	Milwaukee	73
8	Oakland	65
6	Cleveland State	84
7	Youngstown State	48

Quarterfinals; Thursday, March 5
3	Wright State	52
6	Cleveland State	63
5	Milwaukee	58
4	Northern Kentucky	78

Semifinals; Monday, March 9
1	IUPUI	71
6	Cleveland State	54
2	Green Bay	50
4	Northern Kentucky	49

Championship; Tuesday, March 10
1	IUPUI	51
2	Green Bay	37
