= 2020 SWAC women's basketball tournament =

- Classification: Division I
- Season: 2019–20
- Teams: 8
- Site: Bartow Arena; Birmingham, Alabama
- First round site: Campus sites
- Television: ESPN3

2019–20 SWAC women's basketball standings
| | Conf. | | | | Overall |
| Team | W | | L | PCT | W | | L | PCT |
|---|---|---|---|---|---|---|---|---|
| Jackson State | 15 | – | 1 | .938 | 17 | – | 9 | .654 |
| Texas Southern | 13 | – | 3 | .813 | 18 | – | 9 | .667 |
| Southern | 11 | – | 5 | .688 | 13 | – | 14 | .481 |
| Alabama A&M | 10 | – | 6 | .625 | 14 | – | 13 | .519 |
| Prairie View A&M | 9 | – | 7 | .563 | 12 | – | 16 | .429 |
| Alcorn State | 8 | – | 8 | .500 | 12 | – | 16 | .429 |
| Alabama State | 6 | – | 9 | .400 | 9 | – | 17 | .346 |
| Arkansas-Pine Bluff | 5 | – | 12 | .294 | 6 | – | 21 | .222 |
| Grambling State | 3 | – | 13 | .188 | 4 | – | 23 | .148 |
| Mississippi Valley State | 1 | – | 16 | .059 | 2 | – | 26 | .071 |
† 2020 SWAC tournament winner As of March 12, 2025; Rankings from AP poll

The 2020 SWAC women's basketball tournament was a postseason women's basketball tournament scheduled to take place March 10–14, 2020. Tournament first-round games were held on campus sites at the higher seed on March 10. The remaining rounds and the semifinals and championship were to be held at the Bartow Arena in Birmingham, Alabama. The winner would have received the Southwestern Athletic Conference's automatic bid to the 2020 NCAA Division I women's basketball tournament.

Unlike most NCAA Division I basketball conference tournaments, the SWAC tournament does not include all of the league's teams. The tournament instead features only the top eight teams from regular-season SWAC play. On March 12, the NCAA announced that the tournament was cancelled due to the coronavirus pandemic.

== Seeds ==
| Seed | School | Conference record | Overall record | Tiebreaker |
|---|---|---|---|---|
| 1 | Jackson State | 16–2 | 18–10 | |
| 2 | Texas Southern | 14–4 | 19–10 | |
| 3 | Southern | 13–5 | 15–14 | |
| 4 | Alabama A&M | 12–6 | 16–13 | |
| 5 | Alcorn State | 9–9 | 13–17 | 2–0 vs. PVAM |
| 6 | Prairie View A&M | 9–9 | 12–18 | |
| 7 | Arkansas-Pine Bluff | 6–12 | 7–21 | |
| 8 | Alabama State | 6–12 | 9–20 | |

== Bracket ==
Quarterfinals; Tuesday, March 10
1 | Jackson State | 71
8 | Alabama State | 53
4 | Alabama A&M | 74
5 | Alcorn State | 54
3 | Southern | 59
6 | Prairie View A&M | 55
2 | Texas Southern | 77
7 | Arkansas-Pine Bluff | 46

Semifinals; Friday, March 13; ESPN3
1 | Jackson State | 2:00 pm
4 | Alabama A&M
3 | Southern | 8:00 pm
2 | Texas Southern

Championship; Saturday, March 14; ESPN3, 1:30 pm

First round games at campus sites of lower-numbered seeds

== See also ==
- 2020 SWAC men's basketball tournament
