= 2020 Big Sky Conference women's basketball tournament =

- Classification: Division I
- Season: 2019–20
- Teams: 11
- Site: CenturyLink Arena; Boise, Idaho
- Television: Pluto TV, ELEVEN

2019–20 Big Sky women's basketball standings
| | Conf. | | | | Overall |
| Team | W | | L | PCT | W | | L | PCT |
|---|---|---|---|---|---|---|---|---|
| Montana State | 17 | – | 1 | .944 | 21 | – | 6 | .778 |
| Idaho | 13 | – | 5 | .722 | 18 | – | 9 | .667 |
| Idaho State | 12 | – | 6 | .667 | 16 | – | 11 | .593 |
| Northern Arizona | 12 | – | 7 | .632 | 15 | – | 13 | .536 |
| Montana | 11 | – | 7 | .611 | 16 | – | 11 | .593 |
| Southern Utah | 10 | – | 8 | .556 | 16 | – | 11 | .593 |
| Northern Colorado | 8 | – | 10 | .444 | 12 | – | 15 | .444 |
| Portland State | 7 | – | 11 | .389 | 13 | – | 15 | .464 |
| Sacramento State | 6 | – | 13 | .316 | 8 | – | 20 | .286 |
| Eastern Washington | 3 | – | 15 | .167 | 4 | – | 23 | .148 |
| Weber State | 1 | – | 17 | .056 | 3 | – | 24 | .111 |
† 2020 Big Sky tournament winner Rankings from AP poll

The 2020 Big Sky Conference women's basketball tournament was a postseason tournament that was scheduled to be played from March 9–13, 2020, at CenturyLink Arena in Boise, Idaho. The winner of the tournament would have earned an automatic bid to the 2020 NCAA tournament. On March 12, the NCAA announced that its tournament was cancelled due to the coronavirus pandemic, and the Big Sky final on March 13 was not played.

== Schedule ==
| Session | Game | Time* | Matchup^{#} | Score | Television |
First Round – Monday, March 9
| 1 | 1 | 2:30 PM | #8 Northern Colorado vs. #9 Sacramento State | 79–61 | Pluto TV 231 |
| 1 | 2 | 5:30 PM | #7 Portland State vs. #10 Eastern Washington | 83–70 | Pluto TV 231 |
| 1 | 3 | 8:00 PM | #6 Southern Utah vs. #11 Weber State | 62–58 | Pluto TV 231 |
Quarterfinals – Tuesday, March 10
| 2 | 4 | Noon | #1 Montana State vs. #8 Northern Colorado | 67–62 | Pluto TV 231 |
| 2 | 5 | 2:30 PM | #4 Montana vs. #5 Northern Arizona | 55–58 | Pluto TV 231 |
| 3 | 6 | 5:30 PM | #2 Idaho vs. #7 Portland State | 56–54 | Pluto TV 231 |
| 3 | 7 | 8:00 PM | #3 Idaho State vs. #6 Southern Utah | 70–63 | Pluto TV 231 |
Semifinals – Wednesday, March 11
| 4 | 8 | 5:30 PM | #1 Montana State vs. #5 Northern Arizona | 76–71 | ELEVEN |
| 4 | 9 | 8:00 PM | #2 Idaho vs. #3 Idaho State | 66–51 | ELEVEN |
Championship Game – Friday, March 13
| 5 | 10 | —N/a | #1 Montana State vs. #2 Idaho | Cancelled | |
*Game times in Mountain time.

== Bracket ==
First round Monday, March 9
8 | Northern Colorado | 79
9 | Sacramento State | 61
7 | Portland State | 83
10 | Eastern Washington | 70
6 | Southern Utah | 62
11 | Weber State | 58

Quarterfinals; Tuesday, March 10
1 | Montana State | 67
8 | Northern Colorado | 62
4 | Montana | 55
5 | Northern Arizona | 58
2 | Idaho | 56
7 | Portland State | 54
3 | Idaho State | 70
6 | Southern Utah | 63

Semifinals; Wednesday, March 11
1 | Montana State | 76
5 | Northern Arizona | 71
2 | Idaho | 66
3 | Idaho State | 51

Championship; Friday, March 13
1 | Montana State
2 | Idaho
