= 2020 Ohio Valley Conference women's basketball tournament =

- Classification: Division I
- Season: 2019–20
- Teams: 8
- Site: Ford Center; Evansville, Indiana
- Champions: Southeast Missouri State (2nd title)
- Winning coach: Rekha Patterson (1st title)
- Television: ESPN+

2019–20 Ohio Valley Conference women's basketball standings
	Conf.				Overall
Team	W		L	PCT	W		L	PCT
Belmont	16	–	2	.889	21	–	8	.724
UT Martin	16	–	2	.889	20	–	9	.690
Southeast Missouri State†	14	–	4	.778	22	–	7	.759
Eastern Illinois	12	–	6	.667	18	–	11	.621
Tennessee Tech	10	–	8	.556	17	–	12	.586
Jacksonville State	10	–	8	.556	14	–	15	.483
Austin Peay	9	–	9	.500	18	–	11	.621
Murray State	7	–	11	.389	14	–	15	.483
Morehead State	6	–	12	.333	10	–	20	.333
Eastern Kentucky	5	–	13	.278	11	–	18	.379
Tennessee State	2	–	16	.111	4	–	24	.143
SIU Edwardsville	1	–	17	.056	3	–	26	.103
† 2020 OVC tournament winner Rankings from AP poll

The 2020 Ohio Valley Conference women's basketball tournament ended the 2019-20 season of Ohio Valley Conference women's basketball. The tournament was held March 4–7, 2020, at Ford Center in Evansville, Indiana. Southeast Missouri State was the winner, receiving an automatic bid to the NCAA Tournament.

== Format ==
The OVC women's tournament is a traditional single-elimination tournament featuring the top eight teams in the conference regular-season standings. This differs from the format used in the OVC men's tournament; while that tournament also involves only eight of the league's 12 members, it has a radically different format, consisting of two stepladder brackets that produce the tournament finalists. The women's tournament is seeded so that the #8 seed faces the #1 seed in the first round, #7 faces #2, and so on. There is no reseeding, so if the #8 team were to defeat the #1 seed it would continue in the tournament playing the team which would have faced the #1 seed in the subsequent round (winner of #4 vs. #5).

== Seeds ==
Seed	School	Conference	Overall	Tiebreaker
1	UT Martin	16–2	20–9	
2	Belmont	16–2	22–8	
3	Southeast Missouri State	14–4	22–7	
4	Eastern Illinois	12–6	28–11	
5	Jacksonville State	10–8	14–15	2–0 vs. Tennessee Tech
6	Tennessee Tech	10–8	17–12	0–2 vs. Jacksonville State
7	Austin Peay	9–9	18–11	
8	Murray State	7–11	14–16	

== Bracket ==
- All times central.

First round Wednesday, March 4 Thursday, March 5 ESPN+
1	UT Martin	88
8	Murray State	33
4	Eastern Illinois	49
5	Jacksonville State	46
2	Belmont	76*
7	Austin Peay	73
3	Southeast Missouri State	82*
6	Tennessee Tech	81

Semifinals; Friday, March 6 ESPN+
1	UT Martin	63
4	Eastern Illinois	52
2	Belmont	99
3	Southeast Missouri State	114

Championship; Saturday, March 7 ESPN+
1	UT Martin	47
3	Southeast Missouri State	67

* denotes overtime period
