= 2020 MAAC women's basketball tournament =

- Classification: Division I
- Season: 2019–20
- Teams: 11
- Site: Jim Whelan Boardwalk Hall; Atlantic City, New Jersey
- Television: ESPNews, ESPN3

2019–20 MAAC women's basketball standings
	Conf.				Overall
Team	W		L	PCT	W		L	PCT
Marist	18	–	2	.900	26	–	4	.867
Rider	18	–	2	.900	26	–	4	.867
Fairfield	12	–	8	.600	16	–	14	.533
Manhattan	12	–	8	.600	15	–	14	.517
Quinnipiac	12	–	8	.600	15	–	14	.517
Siena	8	–	12	.400	11	–	20	.355
Iona	8	–	12	.400	9	–	21	.300
Niagara	7	–	13	.350	10	–	21	.323
Saint Peter's	6	–	14	.300	9	–	21	.300
Monmouth	5	–	15	.250	9	–	22	.290
Canisius	4	–	16	.200	5	–	25	.167
† 2020 MAAC tournament winner Rankings from AP poll

The 2020 Metro Atlantic Athletic Conference women's basketball tournament was to be the postseason women's basketball tournament for the Metro Atlantic Athletic Conference for the 2019–20 NCAA Division I women's basketball season. It was to be held from March 10–14, 2020, at the Jim Whelan Boardwalk Hall in Atlantic City, New Jersey for the first time in MAAC history. The defending champions were the Quinnipiac Bobcats.

On March 12, 2020, amidst the tournament's quarterfinals, both the NCAA and MAAC officials canceled the tournament, due to the coronavirus pandemic.

== Seeds ==
All 11 teams in the conference participate in the tournament. The top five teams receive byes to the quarterfinals. Teams are seeded by record within the conference, with a tiebreaker system to seed teams with identical conference records.

Seed	School	Conference	Tiebreaker 1	Tiebreaker 2
1	Rider	18–2	1-1 vs. Marist	2-0 vs. Fairfield
2	Marist	18–2	1-1 vs. Rider	1-1 vs. Fairfield
3	Fairfield	12–8		
4	Manhattan	12–8		
5	Quinnipiac	12–8		
6	Siena	8–12		
7	Iona	8–12		
8	Niagara	7–13		
9	Saint Peter's	6–14		
10	Monmouth	5–15		
11	Canisius	4–16		

== Schedule ==
Session	Game	Time*	Matchup	Score	Television
First round – Tuesday, March 10
1	1	9:30 am	(8) Niagara vs. (9) Saint Peter's	64–53	ESPN3
1	2	11:30 am	(7) Iona vs. (10) Monmouth	60–69	ESPN3
1	3	1:30 pm	(6) Siena vs. (11) Canisius	58–48	ESPN3
Quarterfinals – Wednesday, March 11
2	4	1:30 pm	(1) Rider vs. (8) Niagara	79–75	ESPN3
2	5	3:30 pm	(2) Marist vs. (10) Monmouth	68–44	ESPN3
Quarterfinals – Thursday, March 12
3	6	12:00 pm	(3) Fairfield vs. (6) Siena	72-56	ESPN3
3	7	2:30 pm	(4) Manhattan vs. (5) Quinnipiac	Canceled	ESPN3
Semifinals – Friday, March 13
4	8	11:00 am	(1) Rider vs. Game 7 Winner	Canceled	ESPN3
4	9	1:30 pm	(2) Marist vs. (3) Fairfield	Canceled	ESPN3
Championship – Saturday, March 14
5	10	11:00 am	Game 8 Winner vs. Game 9 Winner	Canceled	ESPNews
*Game times in ET. ()-Rankings denote tournament seeding.

== Bracket ==
First round Tuesday, March 10; ESPN3
8	Niagara	64
9	Saint Peter's	53
7	Iona	60
10	Monmouth	69
6	Siena	58
11	Canisius	48

Quarterfinals; Wednesday/Thursday, March 11/12; ESPN3
1	Rider	79
8	Niagara	74
4	Manhattan
5	Quinnipiac
2	Marist	68
10	Monmouth	44
3	Fairfield	72
6	Siena	56

Semifinals; Friday, March 13; ESPN3

Championship; Saturday, March 14; ESPNews

* denotes number of overtimes

== See also ==
- 2020 MAAC men's basketball tournament
