= 2020 MEAC women's basketball tournament =

Women's college basketball tournament

- Classification: Division I
- Season: 2019–20
- Teams: 10
- Site: Norfolk Scope; Norfolk, Virginia
- Television: ESPN3

2019–20 MEAC women's basketball standings
	Conf.				Overall
Team	W		L	PCT	W		L	PCT
Bethune–Cookman	15	–	1	.938	22	–	5	.815
Norfolk State	12	–	4	.750	18	–	11	.621
Morgan State	12	–	4	.750	16	–	13	.552
North Carolina A&T	11	–	5	.688	19	–	9	.679
North Carolina Central	9	–	7	.563	12	–	17	.414
Delaware State	8	–	8	.500	12	–	17	.414
Howard	7	–	9	.438	16	–	14	.533
Maryland–Eastern Shore	5	–	11	.313	9	–	21	.300
Florida A&M	4	–	12	.250	6	–	21	.222
Coppin State	3	–	13	.188	3	–	25	.107
South Carolina State	2	–	14	.125	3	–	27	.100
† 2020 MEAC tournament winner As of March 15, 2025; Rankings from AP poll

The 2020 Mid-Eastern Athletic Conference women's basketball tournament was a postseason college basketball tournament that was scheduled to take place March 10–14, 2020, at the Norfolk Scope in Norfolk, Virginia. The first-round games were played on March 11 and March 12, and the quarterfinal games were to be played on March 13 and 14. The semifinals were to be held on March 15, with the championship game on March 16. The winner of the tournament would have received a first-round bid to the 2020 NCAA Tournament. On March 12, the NCAA announced that the tournament was cancelled due to the coronavirus pandemic. That decision, which came with under two minutes remaining in Morgan State's eventual 64-63 quarterfinal win over Delaware State, meant that game became the final college basketball game, men's or women's, played that season, and ultimately the final NCAA-sponsored event of the 2019–20 school year.

== Seeds ==
Only 10 of the 11 teams are eligible for the tournament.

Teams are seeded by record within the conference, with a tiebreaker system to seed teams with identical conference records.

Seed	School	Conference	Tiebreaker
1	Bethune–Cookman	15–1	
2	Norfolk State	12–4	
3	Morgan State	12–4	
4	North Carolina A&T	11–5	
5	North Carolina Central	9–7	
6	Delaware State	8–8	
7	Howard	7–9	
8	Maryland-Eastern Shore	5–11	
9	Coppin State	3–13	
10	South Carolina State	2–14	
† – MEAC regular season champions. Overall records are as of the end of the regular season.

== Schedule ==
Session	Game	Time*	Matchup^{#}	Score	Television
First round – Tuesday, March 10
1	1	Noon	No. 8 Maryland-Eastern Shore vs. No. 9 Coppin State	62–50	FloHoops
1	2	2:30 pm	No. 7 Howard vs. No. 10 South Carolina State	79–72	FloHoops
Quarterfinals – Wednesday, March 11
2	3	Noon	No. 8 Maryland-Eastern Shore vs. No. 1 Bethune-Cookman	61-55	FloHoops
2	4	2:30 pm	No. 7 Howard vs. No. 2 Norfolk State	45–76	FloHoops
Quarterfinals – Thursday, March 12
3	5	Noon	No. 5 North Carolina Central vs. No. 4 North Carolina A&T	56-54	FloHoops
3	6	2:30 pm	No. 6 Delaware State vs. No. 3 Morgan State	63-64	FloHoops
Semifinals – Friday, March 13
4	7		No. 5 North Carolina Central vs. No. 8 Maryland-Eastern Shore	Cancelled	
4	8		No. 2 Norfolk State vs. No. 3 Morgan State	Cancelled	
Championship – Saturday, March 14
6	9		Game 8 winner vs. Game 7 winner	Cancelled	
*Game times in EST. #-Rankings denote tournament seeding.

== Bracket ==
First round Tuesday, March 10
8	Maryland Eastern Shore	62
9	Coppin State	50
7	Howard	79
10	South Carolina State	72

Quarterfinals; Wed./Thurs., March 11/12
1	Bethune-Cookman	55
8	Maryland Eastern Shore	61
4	North Carolina A&T	54
5	North Carolina Central	56
2	Norfolk State	76
7	Howard	45
3	Morgan State	64
6	Delaware State	63

Semifinals; Friday, March 13

Championship game Saturday, March 14; 3:30 pm
