= 2020 NCAA Division I women's basketball tournament =

Canceled basketball tournament

- Season: 2019–20
- Teams: 64 (planned)
- Finals site: Smoothie King Center, New Orleans, Louisiana
- Canceled due to COVID-19 pandemic

The 2020 NCAA Division I women's basketball tournament was scheduled to be played in March and April 2020, with the Final Four played Friday, April 3 and Sunday, April 5 to determine the champion of the 2019–20 NCAA Division I women's basketball season. The Final Four was planned to be played at the Smoothie King Center in New Orleans, Louisiana, with the University of New Orleans, Tulane University and the Sun Belt Conference serving as hosts. This is the fourth time that New Orleans has been selected as a women's Final Four location (previously, in 1991, 2004, and 2013) and third time at the Smoothie King Center (previously named New Orleans Arena); the 1991 Final Four was contested at the University of New Orleans' Lakefront Arena. ESPN had planned to nationally televise all 63 games of the women's tournament for the first time ever.

However, on March 12, the NCAA announced that this tournament was canceled due to the COVID-19 pandemic. It was the first time the tournament had been canceled since its creation in 1982.

== Tournament procedure ==
Pending any changes to the format, a total of 64 teams will enter the 2020 tournament. 32 automatic bids shall be awarded to each program that wins their conference's tournament. The remaining 32 bids are "at-large", with selections extended by the NCAA Selection Committee. The tournament is split into four regional tournaments, and each regional has teams seeded from 1 to 16, with the committee ostensibly making every region as comparable to the others as possible. The top-seeded team in each region plays the #16 team, the #2 team plays the #15, etc. (meaning where the two seeds add up to 17, that team will be assigned to play another).

The selection committee will also seed the entire field from 1 to 64.

== Schedule and venues ==
2020 NCAA regionals and Final Four

The first two rounds, also referred to as the subregionals, were to be played at the sites of the top 16 seeds, as was done from 1995 to 2004 and since 2016.

Regional semifinals and finals (Sweet Sixteen and Elite Eight)

- March 27–30
  - Dallas regional, Moody Coliseum, Dallas, Texas (Note: Moody Coliseum is physically located in University Park, Texas, a city contained within the city limits of Dallas. All locations within University Park have a Dallas mailing address.) (Host: SMU)
  - Fort Wayne regional, Allen County War Memorial Coliseum, Fort Wayne, Indiana (Host: Purdue Fort Wayne (Note: At the time the regional venues were announced, the host institution was Indiana University – Purdue University Fort Wayne (IPFW). In July 2018, IPFW was dissolved and replaced by separate institutions affiliated with Indiana University and Purdue University. Since the IPFW athletic program was transferred to the newly launched Purdue University Fort Wayne, that institution inherited hosting duties.))
  - Greenville regional, Bon Secours Wellness Arena, Greenville, South Carolina (Host: Southern Conference)
  - Portland regional, Moda Center, Portland, Oregon (Host: Oregon State)

National semifinals and championship (Final Four and championship)

- April 3 and April 5
  - Smoothie King Center, New Orleans, Louisiana (Hosts: University of New Orleans, Tulane University, and Sun Belt Conference)

== Coronavirus impact ==
On March 11, 2020, the NCAA announced that both men's and women's NCAA Tournaments would take place without fans due to the COVID-19 pandemic in the United States. This was followed up, on March 12, by an announcement cancelling the tournaments.

== Subregionals tournament and automatic qualifiers ==
=== Automatic qualifiers ===
The following teams had automatically qualified for the 2020 NCAA field by virtue of winning their conference's tournament. All conference tournaments that had not been completed were cancelled, the majority of which without naming an automatic qualifier.

Teams marked with a † received automatic bids after their conference tournaments were cancelled due to the coronavirus pandemic.

Conference	Team	Record	Appearance	Last bid
ACC	NC State	28–4	26th	2019
America East	Stony Brook †	28–3	1st	Never
American	UConn	29–3	32nd	2019
Atlantic 10	Dayton	25–8	9th	2018
Atlantic Sun	Tournament canceled, no automatic bid			
Big 12	Tournament canceled, no automatic bid			
Big East	DePaul	28–5	25th	2019
Big Sky	Tournament canceled, no automatic bid			
Big South	Campbell †	21-8	2nd	2000
Big Ten	Maryland	28–4	28th	2019
Big West	Tournament canceled, no automatic bid			
Colonial	Tournament canceled, no automatic bid			
C-USA	Tournament canceled, no automatic bid			
Horizon	IUPUI	23–8	1st	Never
Ivy League	Princeton †	26–1	9th	2019
MAAC	Rider †	26-4	1st	Never
MAC	Central Michigan †	23-7	6th	2019
MEAC	Tournament canceled, no automatic bid			
Missouri Valley	Tournament cancelled, no automatic bid			
Mountain West	Boise State	24–9	7th	2019
Northeast	Robert Morris †	23-7	7th	2019
Ohio Valley	Southeast Missouri State	25–7	3rd	2007
Pac-12	Oregon	31–2	16th	2019
Patriot	Tournament canceled, no automatic bid			
SEC	South Carolina	32–1	17th	2019
Southern	Samford	18–14	3rd	2012
Southland	Tournament canceled, no automatic bid			
SWAC	Tournament canceled, no automatic bid			
Summit League	South Dakota	30–2	3rd	2019
Sun Belt	Troy †	25–4	4th	2017
West Coast	Portland	21–11	5th	1997
WAC	Kansas City †	21-10	1st	Never

== See also ==
- 2020 NCAA Division I men's basketball tournament
