= 2020 Big 12 Conference women's basketball tournament =

- Classification: Division I
- Season: 2019–20
- Teams: 10
- Site: Municipal Auditorium; Kansas City, Missouri
- Television: FCS, FSN, FS2, ESPN2

2019–20 Big 12 Conference women's basketball standings
	Conf.				Overall
Team	W		L	PCT	W		L	PCT
No. 3 Baylor	17	–	1	.944	28	–	2	.933
TCU	13	–	5	.722	22	–	7	.759
Texas	11	–	7	.611	19	–	11	.633
Iowa State	10	–	8	.556	18	–	11	.621
Kansas State	10	–	8	.556	16	–	13	.552
Texas Tech	7	–	11	.389	18	–	11	.621
West Virginia	7	–	11	.389	17	–	12	.586
Oklahoma State	6	–	12	.333	15	–	15	.500
Oklahoma	5	–	13	.278	12	–	18	.400
Kansas	4	–	14	.222	15	–	14	.517
† 2020 Big 12 tournament winner Rankings from AP poll

The 2020 Phillips 66 Big 12 Conference women's basketball tournament was a postseason tournament for the Big 12 Conference that was scheduled to be held from March 12 to 15, 2020, in Kansas City, Missouri, at the Municipal Auditorium. On March 12, the NCAA announced that the tournament was cancelled due to the coronavirus pandemic before any games were played.

== Seeds ==
2020 Big 12 Conference women's basketball tournament seeds
Seed	School	Conf.	Over.	Tiebreaker
1	Baylor ‡	17–1	28–2	
2	TCU #	13–5	22–7	
3	Texas #	11–7	19–11	
4	Iowa State #	10–8	18–11	1–1 vs. Baylor
5	Kansas State #	10–8	16–13	0–2 vs. Baylor
6	West Virginia #	7–11	17–12	2–0 vs. Texas Tech
7	Texas Tech	7–11	18–11	
8	Oklahoma State	6–12	15–15	
9	Oklahoma	5–13	12–18	
10	Kansas	4–14	15–14	
‡ – Big 12 Conference regular season champions, and tournament No. 1 seed. # - Received a single-bye in the conference tournament. Overall records include all games played in the Big 12 Conference tournament.

== See also ==
- 2020 Big 12 Conference men's basketball tournament
- 2020 NCAA Women's Division I Basketball Tournament
- 2019–20 NCAA Division I women's basketball rankings
