= 2019–20 Texas Tech Lady Raiders basketball team =

Women's college basketball season

2019–20 Texas Tech Lady Raiders basketball
- Conference: Big 12 Conference
- Record: 18–11 (7–11 Big 12)
- Head coach: Marlene Stollings (2nd season)
- Assistant coaches: Nikita Lowry Dawkins; Malikah Willis
- Home arena: United Supermarkets Arena

2019–20 Big 12 Conference women's basketball standings
	Conf.				Overall
Team	W		L	PCT	W		L	PCT
No. 3 Baylor	17	–	1	.944	28	–	2	.933
TCU	13	–	5	.722	22	–	7	.759
Texas	11	–	7	.611	19	–	11	.633
Iowa State	10	–	8	.556	18	–	11	.621
Kansas State	10	–	8	.556	16	–	13	.552
Texas Tech	7	–	11	.389	18	–	11	.621
West Virginia	7	–	11	.389	17	–	12	.586
Oklahoma State	6	–	12	.333	15	–	15	.500
Oklahoma	5	–	13	.278	12	–	18	.400
Kansas	4	–	14	.222	15	–	14	.517
† 2020 Big 12 tournament winner Rankings from AP poll

The 2019–20 Texas Tech Lady Raiders basketball team represented Texas Tech University in the 2019–20 NCAA Division I women's basketball season. The Lady Raiders were led by second-year head coach Marlene Stollings. They played their homes games at United Supermarkets Arena and were members of the Big 12 Conference.

They finished the season 18–11, 7–11 in Big 12 play to finish tied for sixth place. They were scheduled to be the seventh seed in the Big 12 Tournament, but it was cancelled before it began due to the COVID-19 pandemic. The NCAA women's basketball tournament and WNIT were also canceled.

== Media ==
=== Television and radio information ===
Select Lady Raiders games were shown on FSN affiliates throughout the season, including FSSW, FSSW+, and FCS Atlantic, Central, and Pacific. All games were broadcast on the Lady Raiders Radio Network on either KLZK or KJTV.

== Roster ==
2019–20 Texas Tech Lady Raiders women's basketball team
Players
Coaches

Pos.	#	Name	Height	Year	Previous school	Hometown
G	0	Chrislyn Carr	5 ft 5 in (1.65 m)	So	West	Davenport, IA
G	3	Maka Jackson	5 ft 8 in (1.73 m)	Jr	Stonewall Jackson; South Georgia Technical College	ʻEwa Beach, HI
G	5	Jo'nah Johnson	5 ft 9 in (1.75 m)	Jr	Edmond Santa Fe; Northeastern Oklahoma A&M College	Edmond, OK
G	14	Jada Walton	5 ft 11 in (1.8 m)	Jr	Southwest DeKalb; Texas A&M	Lithonia, GA
G	15	Andrayah Adams	5 ft 10 in (1.78 m)	Jr	Como Park; St. John's	Minneapolis, MN
F	20	Brittany Brewer	6 ft 5 in (1.96 m)	Sr	Wylie	Abilene, TX
G/F	34	Lexi Gordon	6 ft 0 in (1.83 m)	So	L. D. Bell; UConn	Fort Worth, TX
G	35	Alexis Tucker	5 ft 11 in (1.8 m)	Fr	Junípero Serra	Hawthrone, CA

Head coach

- Marlene Stollings (Ohio)

Assistant coach(es)

- Nikita Lowry Dawkins (Ohio State)
- Malikah Willis (West Virginia)

Legend

- (C) Team captain
- (S) Suspended
- (I) Ineligible
- (W) Walk-on
- Injured
- Current redshirt

Roster

== Schedule ==
Date time, TV	Rank^{#}	Opponent^{#}	Result	Record	Site (attendance) city, state
Non-conference regular season
November 14, 2019*; 6:00 p.m., FSSW		Sam Houston State	W 99–57	1–0	United Supermarkets Arena (4,078); Lubbock, TX
November 18, 2019*; 6:00 p.m.		Florida A&M	W 98–60	2–0	United Supermarkets Arena (2,833); Lubbock, TX
November 22, 2019*; 7:00 p.m.		Northwestern State	W 79–49	3–0	United Supermarkets Arena (2,857); Lubbock, TX
November 29, 2019*; 6:30 p.m.		vs. Purdue Fort Wayne; San Diego Thanksgiving Tournament	W 82–48	4–0	Jenny Craig Pavilion; San Diego, CA
November 30, 2019*; 6:30 p.m.		at San Diego; San Diego Thanksgiving Tournament	W 64–60	5–0	Jenny Craig Pavilion (288); San Diego, CA
December 4, 2019*; 7:00 p.m., FSSW+		Ole Miss; Big 12/SEC Women's Challenge	W 84–48	6–0	United Supermarkets Arena (4,212); Lubbock, TX
December 15, 2019*; 12:00 p.m., FSSW		Houston Baptist	W 59–51	7–0	United Supermarkets Arena (3,557); Lubbock, TX
December 17, 2019*; 12:00 p.m.		Prairie View A&M	W 82–48	8–0	United Supermarkets Arena (9,000); Lubbock, TX
December 20, 2019*; 7:00 p.m.		Arkansas-Pine Bluff	W 81–55	9–0	United Supermarkets Arena (3,276); Lubbock, TX
December 22, 2019*; 1:00 p.m.		Louisiana–Monroe	W 83–38	10–0	United Supermarkets Arena (3,276); Lubbock, TX
December 29, 2019*; 12:00 p.m.		UTSA	W 115–58	11–0	United Supermarkets Arena (4,172); Lubbock, TX
Big 12 regular season
January 3, 2020; 7:00 p.m., FSSW		Iowa State	L 66–96	11–1 (0–1)	United Supermarkets Arena (5,137); Lubbock, TX
January 8, 2020; 6:30 p.m.		at TCU	W 80–76	12–1 (1–1)	Schollmaier Arena (2,292); Fort Worth, TX
January 11, 2020; 3:00 p.m., FSSW		Kansas State	L 72–76	12–2 (1–2)	United Supermarkets Arena (4,548); Lubbock, TX
January 15, 2020; 7:00 p.m., LHN		at Texas	L 66–92	12–3 (1–3)	Frank Erwin Center (2,797); Austin, TX
January 18, 2020; 5:00 p.m., ESPN+		at Kansas	L 50–67	12–4 (1–4)	Allen Fieldhouse (1,569); Lawrence, KS
January 22, 2020; 7:00 p.m.		Oklahoma	W 89–84	13–4 (2–4)	United Supermarkets Arena (4,155); Lubbock, TX
January 25, 2020; 2:00 p.m., ESPN+		at No. 2 Baylor	L 79–87	13–5 (2–5)	Ferrell Center (7,098); Waco, TX
February 1, 2020; 3:00 p.m., FSSW		Oklahoma State	W 109–79	14–5 (3–5)	United Supermarkets Arena (5,180); Lubbock, TX
February 5, 2020; 6:30 p.m., ESPN+		at Kansas State	L 70–84	14–6 (3–6)	Bramlage Coliseum (2,669); Manhattan, KS
February 9, 2020; 1:00 p.m., ESPNU		Texas	L 66–81	14–7 (3–7)	United Supermarkets Arena (4,738); Lubbock, TX
February 12, 2020; 7:00 p.m.		Kansas	W 89–72	15–7 (4–7)	United Supermarkets Arena (3,407); Lubbock, TX
February 15, 2020; 4:00 p.m., AT&T SportsNet		at West Virginia	L 60–67	15–8 (4–8)	WVU Coliseum (2,617); Morgantown, WV
February 18, 2020; 7:00 p.m., FSN		No. 2 Baylor	L 62–77	15–9 (4–9)	United Supermarkets Arena (5,043); Lubbock, TX
February 23, 2020; 2:00 p.m., ESPN+		at Iowa State	W 77–74	16–9 (5–9)	Hilton Coliseum (10,933); Ames, IA
February 26, 2020; 7:00 p.m.		at Oklahoma State	L 58–74	16–10 (5–10)	Gallagher-Iba Arena (1,821); Stillwater, OK
March 1, 2020; 12:00 p.m., FSN		No. 25 TCU	W 87–83	17–10 (6–10)	United Supermarkets Arena (4,204); Lubbock, TX
March 4, 2020; 8:00 p.m., FSSW+		West Virginia	L 69–71	17–11 (6–11)	United Supermarkets Arena; Lubbock, TX
March 7, 2020; 1:00 p.m., FSOK		at Oklahoma	W 106–94	18–11 (7–11)	Lloyd Noble Center (2,513); Norman, OK
Big 12 Women's Tournament
March 12, 2020; 8:30 p.m., FSN	(7)	vs. (10) Kansas; First Round	Canceled		Municipal Auditorium; Kansas City, Missouri
*Non-conference game. ^{#}Rankings from AP Poll. (#) Tournament seedings in parentheses. All times are in Central Time.

== Rankings ==
Regular season polls
Poll	Pre- season	Week 2	Week 3	Week 4	Week 5	Week 6	Week 7	Week 8	Week 9	Week 10	Week 11	Week 12	Week 13	Week 14	Week 15	Week 16	Week 17	Week 18	Week 19	Final
AP								RV	RV											N/A
Coaches							RV	RV												

Legend
	Increase in ranking
	Decrease in ranking
	Not ranked in previous week
(RV)	Received votes
(NR)	Not ranked

== See also ==
- 2019–20 Texas Tech Red Raiders basketball team
