= 2019–20 Oklahoma State Cowgirls basketball team =

Women's college basketball season

2019–20 Oklahoma State Cowgirls basketball
- Conference: Big 12 Conference
- Record: 15–15 (6–12 Big 12)
- Head coach: Jim Littell (9th season)
- Assistant coaches: Bill Annan; Ashley Davis; Jerise Freeman
- Home arena: Gallagher-Iba Arena

2019–20 Big 12 Conference women's basketball standings
	Conf.				Overall
Team	W		L	PCT	W		L	PCT
No. 3 Baylor	17	–	1	.944	28	–	2	.933
TCU	13	–	5	.722	22	–	7	.759
Texas	11	–	7	.611	19	–	11	.633
Iowa State	10	–	8	.556	18	–	11	.621
Kansas State	10	–	8	.556	16	–	13	.552
Texas Tech	7	–	11	.389	18	–	11	.621
West Virginia	7	–	11	.389	17	–	12	.586
Oklahoma State	6	–	12	.333	15	–	15	.500
Oklahoma	5	–	13	.278	12	–	18	.400
Kansas	4	–	14	.222	15	–	14	.517
† 2020 Big 12 tournament winner Rankings from AP poll

The 2019–20 Oklahoma State Cowgirls basketball team represented Oklahoma State University in the 2019–20 NCAA Division I women's basketball season. The Cowgirls, led by ninth-year head coach Jim Littell, played their home games at Gallagher-Iba Arena in Stillwater, Oklahoma and were members of the Big 12 Conference.

They finished the season 15–15, 6–12 in Big 12 play, to finish in eighth place. The Big 12 tournament, NCAA women's basketball tournament and WNIT were all cancelled before they began due to the COVID-19 pandemic.

== Previous season ==
The Cowgirls finished the 2018–19 season 14–16, 5–13 in Big 12 play, to finish in seventh place. They lost in the first round of the Big 12 women's tournament to Kansas.

== Roster ==
2019–20 Oklahoma State Cowgirls women's basketball team
Players
Coaches

Pos.	#	Name	Height	Year	Previous school	Hometown
C	1	Kassidy De Lapp	6 ft 3 in (1.91 m)	So	Oak Ridge	El Dorado Hills, CA
G	3	Micah Dennis	5 ft 9 in (1.75 m)	Fr	Cairine Wilson	Toronto, ON
F	4	Natasha Mack	6 ft 4 in (1.93 m)	Jr	Lufkin; Angelina College	Lufkin, TX
F	10	Bryn Gerlich	6 ft 0 in (1.83 m)	So	Colleyville Heritage	Colleyville, TX
F	11	Bigue Sarr	6 ft 3 in (1.91 m)	Jr	Malick Sy; South Georgia Technical College	Dakar, Senegal
F	12	Vivian Gray	6 ft 1 in (1.85 m)	Jr	Argyle; Fort Lewis	Argyle, TX
C	15	Mariam Gnanou	6 ft 5 in (1.96 m)	Sr	Lycée Moderne De Koumassi; Northeastern Oklahoma A&M	Abidjan, Ivory Coast
F	20	Bailey Golden	5 ft 11 in (1.8 m)	Fr	Choctaw	Choctaw, OK
G	21	Ja'Mee Asberry	5 ft 5 in (1.65 m)	RS So	East Central	Tulsa, OK
G	23	Lauren Fields	5 ft 9 in (1.75 m)	RS Fr	Shawnee	Shawnee, OK
F	24	Kennedi Jackson	6 ft 3 in (1.91 m)	Fr	Ursuline	New Orleans, LA
F	25	Abbie Winchester	6 ft 1 in (1.85 m)	Jr	Heritage Hall	Oklahoma City, OK
G	30	Sara Rodrigues	6 ft 3 in (1.91 m)	Fr	Colégio Integrado de Guarulhos	São Paulo, Brazil
G	33	Clitan de Sousa	6 ft 0 in (1.83 m)	RS Sr	Apolotecnica; Seward County CC	Maputo, Mozambique
G	34	Olivia Gray	5 ft 8 in (1.73 m)	Jr	Argyle; Fort Lewis	Argyle, TX

Head coach

- Jim Littell (Southwestern (KS))

Assistant coach(es)

- Bill Annan (Kansas State)
- Ashley Davis (TCU)
- Jerise Freeman (Pacific)

Legend

- (C) Team captain
- (S) Suspended
- (I) Ineligible
- (W) Walk-on
- Injured
- Current redshirt

Roster
Last update: May 28, 2020

== Schedule and results ==
Date time, TV	Rank^{#}	Opponent^{#}	Result	Record	Site (attendance) city, state
Exhibition
October 27, 2020*; 2:00 p.m., ESPN+		Emporia State	W 87–66	–	Gallagher-Iba Arena; Stillwater, OK
Non-conference regular season
November 5, 2019*; 7:00 p.m., ESPN+		Idaho	W 62–47	1–0	Gallagher-Iba Arena (1,123); Stillwater, OK
November 8, 2019*; 11:00 a.m., ESPN+		Lamar	W 74–53	2–0	Gallagher-Iba Arena (3,345); Stillwater, OK
November 13, 2019*; 7:00 p.m.		at Tulsa	W 78–48	3–0	Reynolds Center (1,487); Tulsa, OK
November 19, 2019*; 7:00 p.m., ESPN+		Idaho State	W 70–52	4–0	Gallagher-Iba Arena (1,670); Stillwater, OK
November 23, 2019*; 2:00 p.m., ESPN+		Rice	W 69–38	5–0	Gallagher-Iba Arena (1,740); Stillwater, OK
November 28, 2019*; 2:15 p.m., FloHoops		vs. No. 1 Oregon; Paradise Jam	L 72–89	5–1	Sports and Fitness Center; Saint Thomas, USVI
November 29, 2019*; 12:00 p.m., FloHoops		vs. No. 8 Louisville; Paradise Jam	L 48–69	5–2	Sports and Fitness Center; Saint Thomas, USVI
November 30, 2019*; 12:00 p.m., FloHoops		vs. UT Arlington; Paradise Jam	W 60–47	6–2	Sports and Fitness Center; Saint Thomas, USVI
December 7, 2019*; 7:00 p.m., SECN+		at No. 12 Texas A&M; Big 12/SEC Women's Challenge	L 62–74	6–3	Reed Arena; College Station, TX
December 17, 2019*; 7:00 p.m., ESPN+		Southern	W 72–59	7–3	Gallagher-Iba Arena (1,556); Stillwater, OK
December 20, 2019*; 7:00 p.m., ESPN+		Oral Roberts	W 78–44	8–3	Gallagher-Iba Arena (1,922); Stillwater, OK
December 30, 2019*; 1:00 p.m., ESPN+		Duquesne	W 84–41	9–3	Gallagher-Iba Arena (1,798); Stillwater, OK
Big 12 regular season
January 4, 2020; 2:00 p.m., ESPN+		Kansas	W 67–49	10–3 (1–0)	Gallagher-Iba Arena (2,226); Stillwater, OK
January 8, 2020; 7:00 p.m., FSN		Oklahoma; Bedlam	L 75–77	10–4 (1–1)	Gallagher-Iba Arena (2,558); Stillwater, OK
January 12, 2020; 1:00 p.m., ESPN+		at No. 6 Baylor	L 48–94	10–5 (1–2)	Ferrell Center (6,289); Waco, TX
January 15, 2020; 6:30 p.m., ESPN+		at Kansas State	W 70–63	11–5 (2–2)	Bramlage Coliseum (3,346); Manhattan, KS
January 19, 2020; 2:00 p.m., ESPN+		Iowa State	L 63–64	11–6 (2–3)	Gallagher-Iba Arena (1,835); Stillwater, OK
January 22, 2020; 6:00 p.m.		at No. 25 West Virginia	W 57–55	12–6 (3–3)	WVU Coliseum (1,349); Morgantown, WV
January 25, 2020; 1:00 p.m., FSN		Texas	L 56–61	12–7 (3–4)	Gallagher-Iba Arena (1,793); Stillwater, OK
January 29, 2020; 7:00 p.m., ESPN+		TCU	L 68–72	12–8 (3–5)	Gallagher-Iba Arena (1,689); Stillwater, OK
February 1, 2020; 3:00 p.m., FSSW		at Texas Tech	L 79–109	12–9 (3–6)	United Supermarkets Arena; Lubbock, TX
February 5, 2020; 6:30 p.m.		at Iowa State	L 63–74	12–10 (3–7)	Hilton Coliseum (9,383); Ames, IA
February 8, 2020; 2:00 p.m., ESPN+		West Virginia	W 60–57	13–10 (4–7)	Gallagher-Iba Arena (1,803); Stillwater, OK
February 11, 2020; 7:00 p.m.		at Oklahoma; Bedlam	W 73–69	14–10 (5–7)	Lloyd Noble Center (2,156); Norman, OK
February 15, 2020; 7:00 p.m., ESPN+		No. 2 Baylor	L 42–69	14–11 (5–8)	Gallagher-Iba Arena (2,818); Stillwater, OK
February 23, 2020; 2:00 p.m., FSSW+		at TCU	L 37–49	14–12 (5–9)	Schollmaier Arena (2,731); Fort Worth, TX
February 26, 2020; 7:00 p.m., ESPN+		Texas Tech	W 74–58	15–12 (6–9)	Gallagher-Iba Arena (1,821); Stillwater, OK
February 29, 2020; 5:00 p.m., ESPN+		at Kansas	L 69–77	15–13 (6–10)	Allen Fieldhouse (2,471); Lawrence, KS
March 3, 2020; 7:00 p.m., ESPN+		Kansas State	L 52–62	15–14 (6–11)	Gallagher-Iba Arena (1,663); Stillwater, OK
March 8, 2020; 11:30 a.m., LHN		at Texas	L 52–63	15–15 (6–12)	Frank Erwin Center (4,073); Austin, TX
Big 12 women's tournament
March 12, 2020; 6:00 p.m., FCS	(8)	vs. (9) Oklahoma; First round/Bedlam	Canceled		Municipal Auditorium; Kansas City, Missouri
*Non-conference game. ^{#}Rankings from AP poll. (#) Tournament seedings in parentheses. All times are in Central.

== Rankings ==
Regular-season polls
Poll	Pre- season	Week 2	Week 3	Week 4	Week 5	Week 6	Week 7	Week 8	Week 9	Week 10	Week 11	Week 12	Week 13	Week 14	Week 15	Week 16	Week 17	Week 18	Week 19	Final
AP																				N/A
Coaches	RV	RV	RV	RV																

Legend
	Increase in ranking
	Decrease in ranking
	Not ranked previous week
(RV)	Received votes
(NR)	Not ranked and did not receive votes

== See also ==
- 2019–20 Oklahoma State Cowboys basketball team
