= 2019–20 Kansas State Wildcats women's basketball team =

Women's college basketball season

2019–20 Kansas State Wildcats women's basketball
- Conference: Big 12 Conference
- Record: 16–13 (10–8 Big 12)
- Head coach: Jeff Mittie (6th season)
- Assistant coaches: Brian Ostermann; Chris Carr; Ebony Haliburton
- Home arena: Bramlage Coliseum

2019–20 Big 12 Conference women's basketball standings
	Conf.				Overall
Team	W		L	PCT	W		L	PCT
No. 3 Baylor	17	–	1	.944	28	–	2	.933
TCU	13	–	5	.722	22	–	7	.759
Texas	11	–	7	.611	19	–	11	.633
Iowa State	10	–	8	.556	18	–	11	.621
Kansas State	10	–	8	.556	16	–	13	.552
Texas Tech	7	–	11	.389	18	–	11	.621
West Virginia	7	–	11	.389	17	–	12	.586
Oklahoma State	6	–	12	.333	15	–	15	.500
Oklahoma	5	–	13	.278	12	–	18	.400
Kansas	4	–	14	.222	15	–	14	.517
† 2020 Big 12 tournament winner Rankings from AP poll

The 2019–20 Kansas State Wildcats women's basketball team represented Kansas State University in the 2019–20 NCAA Division I women's basketball season. The Wildcats were led by sixth-year head coach Jeff Mittie. They played their home games at Bramlage Coliseum in Manhattan, Kansas and were members of the Big 12 Conference. They finished the season 16–13, 10–8 in Big 12 play to finish in a tie for fourth place. They were scheduled to be the fifth seed in the Big 12 Tournament, but it was cancelled before it began due to the COVID-19 pandemic. The NCAA women's basketball tournament and WNIT were also canceled.

== Previous season ==
The Wildcats finished the season 21–12, 11–7 in Big 12 play to finish in a tie for fourth place. They advanced to the semifinals of the Big 12 women's basketball tournament, where they lost to Baylor. They received an at-large bid to the NCAA women's basketball tournament as a 9th seed in the Albany Regional, where they lost to Michigan in the first round.

== Roster ==
2019–20 Kansas State Wildcats women's basketball team
Players
Coaches

Pos.	#	Name	Height	Year	Previous school	Hometown
G	1	Savannah Simmons	6 ft 1 in (1.85 m)	So	The John Carroll School	Bel Air, MD
G	2	Cymone Goodrich	5 ft 10 in (1.78 m)	RS So	South Shore International Prep	Chicago, IL
G	3	Angela Harris	5 ft 6 in (1.68 m)	Sr	Cy-Fair; Houston	Cypress, TX
G	5	Alisa Wiggins	5 ft 8 in (1.73 m)	Jr	Montclair	Montclair, NJ
G	10	Jada Thorpe	5 ft 8 in (1.73 m)	Fr	Simeon Career Academy	Chicago, IL
F	11	Peyton Williams	6 ft 4 in (1.93 m)	Sr	Cair Paravel	Topeka, KS
G	12	Rachel Ranke	6 ft 1 in (1.85 m)	Jr	Eastview	Burnsville, MN
F	13	Laura Macke	6 ft 2 in (1.88 m)	So	Nemaha Central	Baileyville, KS
G	24	Emilee Ebert	6 ft 0 in (1.83 m)	Fr	Frankfort	Frankfort, KS
F	25	Jasauen Beard	5 ft 10 in (1.78 m)	RS Sr	Murrietta; Texas–Rio Grande Valley	Midwest City, OK
C	33	Ashley Ray	6 ft 4 in (1.93 m)	Jr	Girard	Girard, KS
G	43	Christianna Carr	6 ft 1 in (1.85 m)	So	Manhattan	Manhattan, KS
F	44	Emma Chapman	6 ft 3 in (1.91 m)	Fr	Hickman	Columbia, MO
C	50	Ayoka Lee	6 ft 5 in (1.96 m)	RS Fr	Byron	Byron, MN

Head coach

- Jeff Mittie (Missouri Western)

Assistant coach(es)

- Brian Ostermann (UW–La Crosse)
- Chris Carr (Southern Illinois)
- Ebony Haliburton (Oral Roberts)

Legend

- (C) Team captain
- (S) Suspended
- (I) Ineligible
- (W) Walk-on
- Injured
- Current redshirt

Roster
Last update: May 20, 2020

== Schedule and results ==
Date time, TV	Rank^{#}	Opponent^{#}	Result	Record	Site (attendance) city, state
Exhibition
October 29, 2019*; 6:30 p.m., ESPN+		Washburn	W 75–59	–	Bramlage Coliseum (2,578); Manhattan, KS
November 1, 2019*; 6:30 p.m., ESPN+		Fort Hays State	W 78–60	–	Bramlage Coliseum (2,753); Manhattan, KS
Non-conference regular season
November 8, 2019*; 6:30 p.m., ESPN+		Omaha	W 73–48	1–0	Bramlage Coliseum (2,719); Manhattan, KS
November 11, 2019*; 6:30 p.m., ESPN+		UIC	W 84–40	2–0	Bramlage Coliseum (2,550); Manhattan, KS
November 18, 2019*; 6:30 p.m., ESPN+		Oral Roberts	W 109–69	3–0	Bramlage Coliseum (2,601); Manhattan, KS
November 24, 2019*; 2:00 p.m., ESPN+		UT Arlington	L 53–57	3–1	Bramlage Coliseum (2,890); Manhattan, KS
November 29, 2019*; 2:00 p.m., FloHoops		vs. Memphis; Junkanoo Jam	L 68–72	3–2	Gateway Christian Academy (150); Bimini, Bahamas
November 30, 2019*; 3:30 p.m., FloHoops		vs. No. 15 Michigan State; Junkanoo Jam	L 60–65	3–3	Gateway Christian Academy (150); Bimini, Bahamas
December 3, 2019*; 6:30 p.m., ESPN+		Incarnate Word	W 85–41	4–3	Bramlage Coliseum (2,546); Manhattan, KS
December 7, 2019*; 2:00 p.m., SECN+		at No. 23 Arkansas; Big 12/SEC Women's Challenge	L 72–81	4–4	Bud Walton Arena (2,168); Fayetteville, AR
December 14, 2019*; 1:00 p.m.		at Kansas City	W 74–67	5–4	Municipal Auditorium (1,008); Kansas City, MO
December 21, 2019*; 2:00 p.m.		at No. 3 Oregon	L 51–89	5–5	Matthew Knight Arena (10,706); Eugene, OR
December 28, 2019*; 2:00 p.m., ESPN+		UTRGV	W 79–66	6–5	Bramlage Coliseum (2,836); Manhattan, KS
Big 12 regular season
January 5, 2020; 12:00 p.m., FSN		No. 19 West Virginia	L 63–74	6–6 (0–1)	Bramlage Coliseum (2,737); Manhattan, KS
January 11, 2020; 3:00 p.m., FSSW		at Texas Tech	W 76–72	7–6 (1–1)	United Supermarkets Arena (4,548); Lubbock, TX
January 15, 2020; 6:30 p.m., ESPN+		Oklahoma State	L 63–70	7–7 (1–2)	Bramlage Coliseum (3,346); Manhattan, KS
January 19, 2020; 12:00 p.m., ESPN+		Texas	L 63–71	7–8 (1–3)	Bramlage Coliseum (4,287); Manhattan, KS
January 22, 2020; 6:30 p.m.		at Iowa State	L 59–73	7–9 (1–4)	Hilton Coliseum (9,469); Ames, IA
January 25, 2020; 2:00 p.m., ESPN+		Oklahoma	W 92–74	8–9 (2–4)	Bramlage Coliseum (5,826); Manhattan, KS
January 29, 2020; 7:00 p.m., FSN		at Kansas; Sunflower Showdown	W 69–61	9–9 (3–4)	Allen Fieldhouse (1,743); Lawrence, KS
February 1, 2020; 1:00 p.m., FSSW		at TCU	L 61–65	9–10 (3–5)	Schollmaier Arena (2,236); Fort Worth, TX
February 5, 2020; 6:30 p.m., ESPN+		Texas Tech	W 84–70	10–10 (4–5)	Bramlage Coliseum (2,669); Manhattan, KS
February 8, 2020; 2:00 p.m., ESPN+		No. 2 Baylor	L 40–54	10–11 (4–6)	Bramlage Coliseum (3,505); Manhattan, KS
February 11, 2020; 6:00 p.m.		at West Virginia	W 56–55	11–11 (5–6)	WVU Coliseum (1,455); Morgantown, WV
February 16, 2020; 2:00 p.m., FS1		at Oklahoma	W 87–85 ^{OT}	12–11 (6–6)	Lloyd Noble Center (3,013); Norman, OK
February 19, 2020; 6:30 p.m., ESPN+		TCU	L 52–54	12–12 (6–7)	Bramlage Coliseum (3,268); Manhattan, KS
February 22, 2020; 12:00 p.m., LHN		at Texas	W 60–54	13–12 (7–7)	Frank Erwin Center (3,392); Austin, TX
February 26, 2020; 6:30 p.m., ESPN+		Iowa State	W 60–51	14–12 (8–7)	Bramlage Coliseum (3,006); Manhattan, KS
February 29, 2020; 6:00 p.m., ESPN+		at No. 2 Baylor	L 58–83	14–13 (8–8)	Ferrell Center (6,976); Waco, TX
March 3, 2020; 7:00 p.m., ESPN+		at Oklahoma State	W 62–52	15–13 (9–8)	Gallagher-Iba Arena (1,663); Stillwater, OK
March 8, 2020; 2:00 p.m., ESPN+		Kansas; Sunflower Showdown	W 83–63	16–13 (10–8)	Bramlage Coliseum (5,172); Manhattan, KS
Big 12 Women's Tournament
March 13, 2020; 11:00 a.m., FSN	(5)	vs. (4) Iowa State; Quarterfinals	–		Municipal Auditorium; Kansas City, MO
*Non-conference game. ^{#}Rankings from AP Poll / Coaches' Poll. (#) Tournament seedings in parentheses. All times are in Central Time.

== Rankings ==
+ Regular season polls	Poll	Pre- season	Week 2	Week 3	Week 4	Week 5	Week 6	Week 7	Week 8	Week 9	Week 10	Week 11	Week 12	Week 13	Week 14	Week 15	Week 16	Week 17	Week 18	Week 19	Final
AP	RV																			N/A	
Coaches	RV																				

Legend
	Increase in ranking
	Decrease in ranking
	No change
(RV)	Received votes
(NR)	Not ranked

== See also ==
- 2019–20 Kansas State Wildcats men's basketball team
