= 2019–20 Oklahoma Sooners women's basketball team =

Women's college basketball season

2019–20 Oklahoma Sooners women's basketball
- Conference: Big 12
- Record: 12–18 (5–13 Big 12)
- Head coach: Sherri Coale (24th season)
- Assistant coaches: Coquese Washington; Colton Coale; Jackie Stiles
- Home arena: Lloyd Noble Center

2019–20 Big 12 Conference women's basketball standings
| | Conf. | | | | Overall |
| Team | W | | L | PCT | W | | L | PCT |
|---|---|---|---|---|---|---|---|---|
| No. 3 Baylor | 17 | – | 1 | .944 | 28 | – | 2 | .933 |
| TCU | 13 | – | 5 | .722 | 22 | – | 7 | .759 |
| Texas | 11 | – | 7 | .611 | 19 | – | 11 | .633 |
| Iowa State | 10 | – | 8 | .556 | 18 | – | 11 | .621 |
| Kansas State | 10 | – | 8 | .556 | 16 | – | 13 | .552 |
| Texas Tech | 7 | – | 11 | .389 | 18 | – | 11 | .621 |
| West Virginia | 7 | – | 11 | .389 | 17 | – | 12 | .586 |
| Oklahoma State | 6 | – | 12 | .333 | 15 | – | 15 | .500 |
| Oklahoma | 5 | – | 13 | .278 | 12 | – | 18 | .400 |
| Kansas | 4 | – | 14 | .222 | 15 | – | 14 | .517 |
† 2020 Big 12 tournament winner Rankings from AP poll

The 2019–20 Oklahoma Sooners women's basketball team represented the University of Oklahoma in the 2019–20 NCAA Division I women's basketball season. The Sooners were led by Sherri Coale in her twenty-fourth season. The team played its home games at the Lloyd Noble Center in Norman, Oklahoma as a member of the Big 12 Conference.

They finished the season 12–18, 5–13 in Big 12 play to finish in ninth place. The Big 12 Tournament, NCAA women's basketball tournament and WNIT were all cancelled before they began due to the COVID-19 pandemic.

== Previous season ==
The Sooners finished the season 8–22, 4–14 in Big 12 play to finish in a tie for eighth place. They lost in the first round of the Big 12 women's tournament to Texas Tech. They missed the postseason tournament for the first time since 1998 and their first losing season in 21 years.

== Roster ==
2019–20 Oklahoma Sooners women's basketball team
Players
Coaches

| Pos. | # | Name | Height | Year | Previous school | Hometown |
|---|---|---|---|---|---|---|
| G | 0 | Jessi Murcer | 5 ft 7 in (1.7 m) | So | Westmoore | Moore, OK |
| F | 3 | Mandy Simpson | 6 ft 0 in (1.83 m) | Jr | Boise | Boise, ID |
| G | 12 | Gabby Gregory | 6 ft 0 in (1.83 m) | Fr | Holland Hall | Tulsa, OK |
| F | 21 | Nydia Lampkin | 6 ft 3 in (1.91 m) | So | Heritage | Palm Bay, FL |
| G | 22 | Ana Llanusa | 6 ft 0 in (1.83 m) | Jr | Choctaw | Choctaw, OK |
| G/F | 25 | Madi Williams | 6 ft 0 in (1.83 m) | So | Trinity Valley School | Fort Worth, TX |
| G | 30 | Taylor Robertson | 5 ft 7 in (1.7 m) | So | McPherson | McPherson, KS |
| C | 31 | Aspen Williston | 6 ft 4 in (1.93 m) | So | Broken Arrow | Broken Arrow, OK |
| G | 32 | Tatum Veitenheimer | 5 ft 8 in (1.73 m) | So | Windthorst | Windthorst, TX |
| F | 34 | Liz Scott | 6 ft 2 in (1.88 m) | Fr | Klein Oak | Tomball, TX |

Head coach

- Sherri Coale (Oklahoma Christian)

Assistant coach(es)

- Courtney Paris (Oklahoma)
- Colton Coale (Oklahoma)
- Jackie Stiles (Missouri State)

Legend

- (C) Team captain
- (S) Suspended
- (I) Ineligible
- (W) Walk-on
- Injured
- Current redshirt

Roster
Last update: May 29, 2020

== Schedule ==
| Date time, TV | Rank^{#} | Opponent^{#} | Result | Record | Site (attendance) city, state |
Exhibition
| November 4, 2019*; 7:00 p.m., FSOK | | Oklahoma City | W 88–68 | – | Lloyd Noble Center (1,643); Norman, OK |
Non-conference regular season
| November 8, 2019*; 8:00 p.m., FSOK | | Prairie View A&M; Preseason WNIT First Round | W 94–48 | 1–0 | Lloyd Noble Center (1,702); Norman, OK |
| November 10, 2019*; 2:00 p.m., FSOK | | UAB; Preseason WNIT Second Round | W 82–75 | 2–0 | Lloyd Noble Center (1,575); Norman, OK |
| November 14, 2019*; 7:00 p.m., FSOK | | Missouri State; Preseason WNIT Semifinals | L 90–96 | 2–1 | Lloyd Noble Center (1,713); Norman, OK |
| November 20, 2019*; 11:00 a.m., FSOK | | Stephen F. Austin | W 75–62 | 3–1 | Lloyd Noble Center (6,875); Norman, OK |
| November 23, 2019*; 2:00 p.m. | | at Houston | L 69–85 | 3–2 | Fertitta Center (1,069); Houston, TX |
| November 26, 2019*; 7:00 p.m., FSOK | | Abilene Christian | W 78–65 | 4–2 | Lloyd Noble Center (2,115); Norman, OK |
| November 30, 2019*; 2:00 p.m., ESPN3 | | at Wichita State | L 83–88 | 4–3 | Charles Koch Arena (2,336); Wichita, KS |
| December 4, 2019*; 6:00 p.m., ESPN+ | | at Western Kentucky | L 63–74 | 4–4 | E. A. Diddle Arena (1,337); Bowling Green, KY |
| December 7, 2019*; 3:00 p.m., FSOK | | No. 25 LSU; Big 12/SEC Women's Challenge | W 90–68 | 5–4 | Lloyd Noble Center (1,327); Norman, OK |
| December 15, 2019*; 2:00 p.m. | | Sam Houston State | W 95–71 | 6–4 | Lloyd Noble Center (1,445); Norman, OK |
| December 17, 2019*; 7:00 p.m., FSOK | | Drake | W 94–83 | 7–4 | Lloyd Noble Center (1,534); Norman, OK |
| December 22, 2019*; 3:00 p.m., CBSSN | | vs. No. 2 Connecticut; Hall of Fame Holiday Showcase | L 53–97 | 7–5 | Mohegan Sun Arena (7,238); Uncasville, CT |
Big 12 Regular Season
| January 4, 2020; 4:00 p.m., FSOK | | No. 6 Baylor | L 56–77 | 7–6 (0–1) | Lloyd Noble Center (3,186); Norman, OK |
| January 8, 2020; 7:00 p.m., FSN | | at Oklahoma State; Bedlam | W 77–75 | 8–6 (1–1) | Gallagher-Iba Arena (2,558); Stillwater, OK |
| January 11, 2020; 1:00 p.m., FSOK | | Iowa State | W 81–72 | 9–6 (2–1) | Lloyd Noble Center (2,363); Norman, OK |
| January 15, 2020; 6:00 p.m., Nexstar | | at No. 17 West Virginia | W 73–49 | 10–6 (3–1) | WVU Coliseum (1,566); Morgantown, WV |
| January 19, 2020; 3:00 p.m., FSOK | | TCU | L 63–82 | 10–7 (3–2) | Lloyd Noble Center (2,594); Norman, OK |
| January 22, 2020; 7:00 p.m. | | at Texas Tech | L 88–89 ^{OT} | 10–8 (3–3) | United Supermarkets Arena (4,155); Lubbock, TX |
| January 25, 2020; 2:00 p.m., ESPN+ | | at Kansas State | L 74–92 | 10–9 (3–4) | Bramlage Coliseum (5,826); Manhattan, KS |
| January 28, 2020; 7:00 p.m., FSOK | | Texas | L 53–70 | 10–10 (3–5) | Lloyd Noble Center (1,736); Norman, OK |
| February 2, 2020; 12:00 p.m., FSN | | at Kansas | W 94–82 ^{OT} | 11–10 (4–5) | Allen Fieldhouse (1,715); Lawrence, KS |
| February 5, 2020; 7:00 p.m., FSOK | | West Virginia | W 68–58 | 12–10 (5–5) | Lloyd Noble Center (709); Norman, OK |
| February 8, 2020; 2:00 p.m. | | at Iowa State | L 59–63 | 12–11 (5–6) | Hilton Coliseum (10,153); Ames, IA |
| February 11, 2020; 7:00 p.m. | | Oklahoma State; Bedlam | L 69–73 | 12–12 (5–7) | Lloyd Noble Center (2,156); Norman, OK |
| February 16, 2020; 2:00 p.m., FS1 | | Kansas State | L 85–87 ^{OT} | 12–13 (5–8) | Lloyd Noble Center (3,013); Norman, OK |
| February 22, 2020; 4:00 p.m., ESPN+ | | at No. 2 Baylor | L 69–101 | 12–14 (5–9) | Ferrell Center; Waco, TX |
| February 26, 2020; 7:00 p.m., FSOK | | Kansas | L 80–83 | 12–15 (5–10) | Lloyd Noble Center (1,765); Norman, OK |
| February 29, 2020; 7:00 p.m., LHN | | at Texas | L 76–86 | 12–16 (5–11) | Frank Erwin Center (3,543); Austin, TX |
| March 4, 2020; 6:00 p.m., FSSW | | at TCU | L 71–96 | 12–17 (5–12) | Schollmaier Arena (3,050); Fort Worth, TX |
| March 7, 2020; 1:00 p.m., FSOK | | Texas Tech | L 94–106 | 12–18 (5–13) | Lloyd Noble Center (2,513); Norman, OK |
Big 12 Women's Tournament
| March 12, 2020; 6:00 p.m., FCS | (9) | vs. (8) Oklahoma State; First Round/Bedlam | Canceled | | Municipal Auditorium; Kansas City, Missouri |
*Non-conference game. ^{#}Rankings from AP Poll. (#) Tournament seedings in parentheses. All times are in Central Time.

== Rankings ==
Regular season polls
| Poll | Pre- Season | Week 2 | Week 3 | Week 4 | Week 5 | Week 6 | Week 7 | Week 8 | Week 9 | Week 10 | Week 11 | Week 12 | Week 13 | Week 14 | Week 15 | Week 16 | Week 17 | Week 18 | Week 19 | Final |
|---|---|---|---|---|---|---|---|---|---|---|---|---|---|---|---|---|---|---|---|---|
| AP | | | | | | | | | | | | | | | | | | | | N/A |
| Coaches | | | | | | | | | | | | | | | | | | | | |

Legend
| | Increase in ranking |
| | Decrease in ranking |
| | No change |
| (RV) | Received votes |
| (NR) | Not ranked |

== See also ==
- 2019–20 Oklahoma Sooners men's basketball team
