= Big 12/SEC Women's Challenge =

Intercollegiate dual-conference basketball series

The Big 12/SEC Women's Challenge was an NCAA Division I women's college basketball series that took place early in the season, consisting of a series of games featuring members of the Big 12 Conference and Southeastern Conference.

In the first two seasons of the challenge (2014–15 and 2015–16), only two members of each conference were involved. Starting in the 2016–17 season, the series expanded to include all 10 members of the Big 12 and an equal number of the 14 SEC teams.

Since the 2016–17 season, the challenge is similar in format to the previously existing ACC–Big Ten Challenge and men's Big 12/SEC Challenge.

The series between the two conferences, as of 2020, is at 2–1–4, with the SEC leading.

== Series History ==
Year	Winner	Overall Record
2014	Tied	1–1
2015	Tied	1–1
2016	SEC	6–4
2017	Tied	5–5
2018	Tied	5–5
2019	Big 12	8–2
2020	SEC	7–1
2021	SEC	6–4

=== 2021–22 ===
Date	Time	Big 12 Team	SEC Team	Location	TV	Attendance	Winner	Leader
Wed. Dec. 1	7:00 PM	West Virginia	No. 16 Kentucky	Memorial Coliseum • Lexington, KY	SECN+	3,587	Kentucky (83–60)	SEC (1–0)
Thu. Dec. 2	Noon	Texas Tech	No. 20 Georgia	United Supermarkets Arena • Lubbock, TX	ESPNU	8,163	Georgia (66–56)	SEC (2–0)
Thu. Dec. 2	9:00 PM	No. 14 Iowa State	LSU	Pete Maravich Assembly Center • Baton Rouge, LA	ESPN2	5,810	LSU (69–60)	SEC (3–0)
Fri. Dec. 3	7:00 PM	Kansas State	No. 1 South Carolina	Colonial Life Arena • Columbia, SC	SECN+	11,657	South Carolina (65–44)	SEC (4–0)
Sat. Dec. 4	3:00 PM	Oklahoma	Mississippi State	Lloyd Noble Center • Norman, OK	Bally Sports Oklahoma	1,400	Oklahoma (94–63)	SEC (4–1)
Sat. Dec. 4	8:00 PM	No. 5 Baylor	Missouri	Ferrell Center • Waco, TX	ESPNU	4,160	Baylor (70–68	SEC (4–2)
Sun. Dec. 5	2:00 PM	TCU	Florida	Schollmaier Arena • Fort Worth, TX	Big12+	1,468	Florida (63–54)	SEC (5–2)
Sun. Dec. 5	3:00 PM	Kansas	Vanderbilt	Allen Fieldhouse • Lawrence, KS	Big12+	1,228	Kansas (74–67)	SEC (5–3)
Sun. Dec. 5	3:00 PM	Oklahoma State	Auburn	Auburn Arena • Auburn, AL	SECN+	1,873	Auburn (77–66)	SEC (6–3)
Sun. Dec. 5	4:00 PM	No. 15 Texas	No. 17 Texas A&M	Reed Arena • College Station, TX	SECN	7,100	Texas (76–60)	SEC (6–4)
Alabama, Arkansas, Ole Miss and Tennessee did not participate for the SEC.

=== 2020–21 ===
Date	Time	Big 12 Team	SEC Team	Location	TV	Attendance	Winner	Leader
Thurs. Dec. 3	7:30 PM	Kansas State	#11 Kentucky	Bramlage Coliseum • Manhattan, KS			Kentucky (60–49)	SEC (1–0)
Thurs. Dec. 3	8:30 PM	Kansas	Ole Miss	The Pavilion at Ole Miss • Oxford, MS	SECN		Ole Miss (70–53)	SEC (2–0)
Sat. Dec. 5	3:30 PM	Oklahoma State	Alabama	Gallagher-Iba Arena • Stillwater, OK			Alabama (76–72)	SEC (3–0)
Sun. Dec. 6	Noon	#23 Iowa State	#1 South Carolina	Hilton Coliseum • Ames, IA	ESPNU		South Carolina (83–65)	SEC (4–0)
Sun. Dec. 6	Noon	Oklahoma	Georgia	Stegeman Coliseum • Athens, GA			Georgia (93–80)	SEC (5–0)
Sun. Dec. 6	2:00 PM	West Virginia	Tennessee	WVU Coliseum • Morgantown, WV			West Virginia (79–73^{OT})	SEC (5–1)
Sun. Dec. 6	6:00 PM	#4 Baylor	#16 Arkansas	Bud Walton Arena • Fayetteville, AR	ESPN2		Arkansas (83–78)	SEC (6–1)
Sun. Dec. 6	8:00 PM	#25 Texas	#12 Texas A&M	Frank Erwin Center • Austin, TX	ESPN2		Texas A&M (66–61)	SEC (7–1)
Auburn, Florida, LSU, and Mississippi State did not participate for the SEC. The Vanderbilt-Texas Tech and TCU-Missouri games were canceled due to COVID-19. All times Eastern

=== 2019–20 ===
Date	Time	Big 12 Team	SEC Team	Location	TV	Attendance	Winner	Leader
Wed. Dec. 4	8:00 PM	#7 Baylor	Georgia	Ferrell Center • Waco, TX	ESPN+	8,172	Baylor (72–38)	Big 12 (1–0)
Wed. Dec. 4	8:00 PM	Texas Tech	Ole Miss	United Supermarkets Arena • Lubbock, TX		4,212	Texas Tech (84–48)	Big 12 (2–0)
Thurs. Dec. 5	7:00 PM	Iowa State	Alabama	Coleman Coliseum • Tuscaloosa, AL	SECN	1,915	Iowa State (75–66)	Big 12 (3–0)
Sat. Dec. 7	3:00 PM	Kansas State	#23 Arkansas	Bud Walton Arena • Fayetteville, AR	SECN	2,168	Arkansas (81–72)	Big 12 (3–1)
Sat. Dec. 7	4:00 PM	Oklahoma	#25 LSU	Lloyd Noble Center • Norman, OK		1,237	Oklahoma (98–60)	Big 12 (4–1)
Sat. Dec. 7	8:00 PM	Oklahoma State	#12 Texas A&M	Reed Arena • College Station, TX	SECN		Texas A&M (74–62)	Big 12 (4–2)
Sat. Dec. 7	3:00 PM	TCU	Auburn	Schollmaier Arena • Fort Worth, TX		2,259	TCU (80–65)	Big 12 (5–2)
Sun. Dec. 8	3:00 PM	Kansas	Florida	Allen Fieldhouse • Lawrence, KS	ESPN+	1,625	Kansas (76–66)	Big 12 (6–2)
Sun. Dec. 8	2:00 PM	Texas	#17 Tennessee	Thompson–Boling Arena • Knoxville, TN	ESPN2	9,371	Texas (66–60)	Big 12 (7–2)
Sun. Dec. 8	2:00 PM	West Virginia	#10 Mississippi State	Humphrey Coliseum • Starkville, MS	SECN	7,113	West Virginia (71–65)	Big 12 (8–2)
Kentucky, Missouri, South Carolina, and Vanderbilt did not participate for the SEC. All times Eastern

=== 2018–19 ===
Date	Time	Big 12 Team	SEC Team	Location	TV	Attendance	Winner	Leader
Thu. Nov. 29	7:00 PM	Kansas	LSU	Maravich Center • Baton Rouge, LA	SECN	1,604	Kansas (68–61)	Big 12 (1–0)
Thu. Nov. 29	9:00 PM	TCU	Ole Miss	The Pavilion at Ole Miss • Oxford, MS	SECN	1,270	TCU (55–50)	Big 12 (2–0)
Sun. Dec. 2	2:00 PM	Kansas State	Vanderbilt	Bramlage Coliseum • Manhattan, KS	ESPN3	3,130	Kansas State (72–61)	Big 12 (3–0)
Sun. Dec. 2	2:00 PM	No. 10 Texas	No. 6 Mississippi State	Frank Erwin Center • Austin, TX	FS1	4,579	Mississippi State (67–49)	Big 12 (3–1)
Sun. Dec. 2	2:00 PM	Texas Tech	Florida	O'Connell Center • Gainesville, FL	SECN	1,259	Florida (72–67)	Big 12 (3–2)
Sun. Dec. 2	3:00 PM	No. 23 Iowa State	Arkansas	Hilton Coliseum • Ames, IA		10,097	Iowa State (91–82)	Big 12 (4–2)
Sun. Dec. 2	4:00 PM	Oklahoma	Auburn	Auburn Arena • Auburn, AL	SECN	1,877	Auburn (95–79)	Big 12 (4–3)
Sun. Dec. 2	4:00 PM	Oklahoma State	No. 11 Tennessee	Gallagher-Iba Arena • Stillwater, OK	FS1	3,493	Tennessee (76–63)	Tied (4–4)
Sun. Dec. 2	5:00 PM	West Virginia	Missouri	WVU Coliseum • Morgantown, WV		1,273	Missouri (68–51)	SEC (5–4)
Sun. Dec. 2	7:00 PM	No. 4 Baylor	No. 18 South Carolina	Colonial Life Arena • Columbia, SC	ESPN2	10,531	Baylor (94–69)	Tied (5–5)
Alabama, Georgia, Kentucky and Texas A&M did not participate for the SEC. All times Eastern

=== 2017–18 ===
Date	Time	Big 12 Team	SEC Team	Location	TV	Attendance	Winner	Leader
Thu. Nov. 30	7:00 PM	Kansas State	No. 19 Missouri	Mizzou Arena • Columbia, MO	SECN	3,068	Missouri (73–59)	SEC 1–0
Thu. Nov. 30	7:30 PM	Texas Tech	LSU	United Supermarkets Arena • Lubbock, TX		4,303	LSU (48–40)	SEC 2–0
Thu. Nov. 30	8:00 PM	No. 9 Baylor	No. 20 Kentucky	Ferrell Center • Waco, TX	FCS	5,356	Baylor (90–63)	SEC 2–1
Fri. Dec. 1	1:00 PM	TCU	Alabama	Schollmaier Arena • Fort Worth, TX	FSSW	3,457	TCU (88–67)	Tied 2–2
Sat. Dec. 2	4:00 PM	Iowa State	Vanderbilt	Memorial Gymnasium • Nashville, TN	SECN	N/A	Vanderbilt (77–74)	SEC 3–2
Sun. Dec. 3	2:00 PM	Oklahoma State	No. 6 Mississippi State	Humphrey Coliseum • Starkville, MS	SECN	5,138	Mississippi State (79–76)	SEC 4-2
Sun. Dec. 3	3:00 PM	Kansas	Arkansas	Allen Fieldhouse • Lawrence, KS	JTV/ESPN3	1,795	Kansas (71–60)	SEC 4-3
Sun. Dec. 3	3:00 PM	Oklahoma	Florida	Lloyd Noble Center • Norman, OK	FSOK+	2,992	Florida (80–61)	SEC 5-3
Sun. Dec. 3	4:00 PM	No. 2 Texas	Georgia	Stegeman Coliseum • Athens, GA	SECN	3,390	Texas (81-53)	SEC 5-4
Sun. Dec. 3	8:00 PM	No. 11 West Virginia	No. 18 Texas A&M	Reed Arena • College Station, TX	ESPNU	3,391	West Virginia (71-56)	Tied 5-5
Auburn, Ole Miss, South Carolina and Tennessee did not participate for the SEC. All times Eastern

=== 2016–17 ===
Date	Time	Big 12 Team	SEC Team	Location	TV	Attendance	Winner	Leader
Thu. Dec. 1	6:00 PM	#12 Oklahoma	#17 Kentucky	Memorial Coliseum • Lexington, KY	SECN	4,400	Kentucky (82–68)	SEC 1–0
Thu. Dec. 1	7:00 PM	#14 Texas	#3 South Carolina	Frank Erwin Center • Austin, TX	ESPN2	3,330	South Carolina (76–67)	SEC 2–0
Thu. Dec. 1	8:00 PM	Kansas State	#23 Auburn	Bramlage Coliseum • Manhattan, KS		4,160	Kansas State (71–66)	SEC 2–1
Sat. Dec. 3	2:30 PM	Iowa State	#6 Mississippi State	Hilton Coliseum • Ames, IA	FSN	10,643	Mississippi State (85–81) OT	SEC 3–1
Sat. Dec. 3	4:00 PM	Texas Tech	Arkansas	Bud Walton Arena • Fayetteville, AR	SECN	1,370	Arkansas (66–60)	SEC 4–1
Sat. Dec. 3	8:00 PM	Oklahoma State	Georgia	Gallagher-Iba Arena • Stillwater, OK		2,497	Oklahoma State (71–51)	SEC 4–2
Sun. Dec. 4	12:00 PM	Kansas	Alabama	Coleman Coliseum • Tuscaloosa, AL	SECN	1,176	Alabama (71–65) OT	SEC 5–2
Sun. Dec. 4	2:00 PM	TCU	LSU	Maravich Assembly Center • Baton Rouge, LA	SECN	1,809	LSU (67–61)	SEC 6–2
Sun. Dec. 4	2:00 PM	#16 West Virginia	Ole Miss	WVU Coliseum • Morgantown, WV		2,634	West Virginia (66–61)	SEC 6–3
Sun. Dec. 4	3:00 PM	#4 Baylor	#22 Tennessee	Thompson–Boling Arena • Knoxville, TN	ESPN2	9,244	Baylor (88–66)	SEC 6–4
Florida, Missouri, Texas A&M and Vanderbilt did not participate for the SEC. All times Eastern

=== 2015–16 ===
Date	Time	Big 12 Team	SEC Team	Location	TV	Attendance	Winner	Leader
Sun., Dec. 20	2:30 PM	#5 Texas	Arkansas	Chesapeake Energy Arena • Oklahoma City, OK	FS1	N/A	Texas (61–50)	Big 12 (1–0)
Sun., Dec. 20	5:00 PM	#17 Oklahoma	#18 Texas A&M	Chesapeake Energy Arena • Oklahoma City, OK	FS1	2,403	Texas A&M (74–68)	Tied (1–1)
All times Eastern

=== 2014–15 ===
Date	Time	Big 12 Team	SEC Team	Location	TV	Attendance	Winner	Leader
Sun., Dec., 21	1:30 PM	#3 Texas	#4 Texas A&M	Verizon Arena • North Little Rock, AR	SECN	2,544	Texas (67–65)	Big 12 (1–0)
Sun., Dec., 21	4:00 PM	Oklahoma	Arkansas	Verizon Arena • North Little Rock, AR	SECN	3,689	Arkansas (71-64)	Tied (1-1)
All times Eastern.

== Team records ==
=== Big 12 Conference (1–2–4) ===
Institution	Wins	Loss
Baylor Lady Bears	3	0
Iowa State Cyclones	2	2
Kansas Jayhawks	3	1
Kansas State Wildcats	2	2
Oklahoma Sooners	1	5
Oklahoma State Cowgirls	1	3
Texas Longhorns	4	2
TCU Horned Frogs	3	1
Texas Tech Lady Raiders	0	3
West Virginia Mountaineers	3	1
Overall	22	20

=== Southeastern Conference (2–1–4) ===
Institution	Wins	Loss	Out
Alabama Crimson Tide	1	2	3
Arkansas Razorbacks	3	3	0
Auburn Tigers	2	1	2
Florida Gators	2	1	3
Georgia Lady Bulldogs	0	2	3
Kentucky Wildcats	2	1	3
LSU Lady Tigers	2	2	2
Missouri Tigers	2	0	3
Mississippi State Bulldogs	3	1	2
Ole Miss Rebels	1	2	2
South Carolina Gamecocks	1	1	2
Tennessee Lady Volunteers	1	2	1
Texas A&M Aggies	2	2	3
Vanderbilt Commodores	1	1	2
Overall	23	21	---

Because the conferences do not have the same number of members (SEC has 14, Big 12 has 10) four teams from the SEC are excluded from participation each year. The number of times an SEC team is excluded is shown in the "Out" column in the table above (updated to include 2019–20 challenge).

== See also ==
- Big 12/SEC Challenge
