= 2019–20 Texas Longhorns women's basketball team =

Intercollegiate basketball season

2019–20 Texas Longhorns women's basketball
- Conference: Big 12 Conference
- Record: 19–11 (11–7 Big 12)
- Head coach: Karen Aston (8th season)
- Assistant coaches: Jamie Carey; George Washington; Terry Nooner
- Home arena: Frank Erwin Center

2019–20 Big 12 Conference women's basketball standings
	Conf.				Overall
Team	W		L	PCT	W		L	PCT
No. 3 Baylor	17	–	1	.944	28	–	2	.933
TCU	13	–	5	.722	22	–	7	.759
Texas	11	–	7	.611	19	–	11	.633
Iowa State	10	–	8	.556	18	–	11	.621
Kansas State	10	–	8	.556	16	–	13	.552
Texas Tech	7	–	11	.389	18	–	11	.621
West Virginia	7	–	11	.389	17	–	12	.586
Oklahoma State	6	–	12	.333	15	–	15	.500
Oklahoma	5	–	13	.278	12	–	18	.400
Kansas	4	–	14	.222	15	–	14	.517
† 2020 Big 12 tournament winner Rankings from AP poll

The 2019–20 Texas Longhorns women's basketball team represented the University of Texas at Austin in the 2019–20 NCAA Division I women's basketball season. It was head coach Karen Aston's eighth season at Texas. The Longhorns were members of the Big 12 Conference and played their home games at the Frank Erwin Center.

The Longhorns finished the season 19–11, 11–7 in Big 12 play to finish in third place. The Big 12 Tournament, NCAA women's basketball tournament and WNIT were all cancelled before they began due to the COVID-19 pandemic.

== Previous season ==
The Longhorns finished the season 23–10, 12–6 in Big 12 play to finish in third place. They advanced to the semifinal game of the Big 12 women's basketball tournament where they lost to Iowa State. They received an at-large bid to the NCAA women's basketball tournament, as a 10th seed in the Portland Regional, where they lost to 7th seed Indiana in the first round.

== Offseason ==
=== Recruits ===
College recruiting information
Name	Hometown	School	Height	Weight	Commit date
Celeste Taylor; G	Valley Stream, NY	Long Island Lutheran	5 ft 11 in (1.80 m)	N/A	
Celeste Taylor; G	Recruit ratings: ESPN: (97)				
Overall recruit ranking:
Note: In many cases, Scout, Rivals, 247Sports, On3, and ESPN may conflict in their listings of height and weight.; In these cases, the average was taken. ESPN grades are on a 100-point scale.; Sources:

== Roster ==
2019–20 Texas Longhorns women's basketball team
Players
Coaches

Pos.	#	Name	Height	Year	Previous school	Hometown
G	0	Celeste Taylor	5 ft 11 in (1.8 m)	Fr	Long Island Lutheran	Valley Stream, NY
G	1	Alecia Sutton	5 ft 8 in (1.73 m)	Sr	Parkway North	St. Louis, MO
G	3	Karisma Ortiz	6 ft 0 in (1.83 m)	Sr	Archbishop Mitty	San Jose, CA
G	4	Isabel Palmer	5 ft 9 in (1.75 m)	Fr	Centre of Excellence	Newcastle, Australia
G	5	Sophie Taylor	5 ft 9 in (1.75 m)	GS	Westwood	Austin, TX
G	10	Lashann Higgs	5 ft 9 in (1.75 m)	Sr	Cedar Ridge	Round Rock, TX
G	11	Joanne Allen-Taylor	5 ft 8 in (1.73 m)	So	Cypress Falls	Houston, TX
G/F	12	Jada Underwood	6 ft 0 in (1.83 m)	Sr	Horn	Mesquite, TX
G/F	22	Shae Routt	6 ft 0 in (1.83 m)	So	Akins	Austin, TX
G/F	24	Joyner Holmes	6 ft 3 in (1.91 m)	Sr	Cedar Hill	Cedar Hill, TX
G/F	31	Audrey Warren	5 ft 9 in (1.75 m)	So	Boswell	Fort Worth, TX
F/C	35	Charli Collier	6 ft 5 in (1.96 m)	So	Barbers Hill	Mont Belvieu, TX

Head coach

- Karen Aston (Little Rock)

Assistant coach(es)

- Jamie Carey (Stanford)
- George Washington (Abilene Christian)
- Terry Nooner (Kansas)

Legend

- (C) Team captain
- (S) Suspended
- (I) Ineligible
- (W) Walk-on
- Injured
- Current redshirt

Roster
Last update: February 6, 2020

== Schedule ==
Date time, TV	Rank^{#}	Opponent^{#}	Result	Record	Site city, state
Exhibition
October 28, 2019*; 7:00 p.m., LHN	No. 15	Lubbock Christian	W 83–73	–	Frank Erwin Center (–); Austin, TX
Non-conference regular season
November 8, 2019*; 6:00 p.m.	No. 15	at USF	L 57–64	0–1	Yuengling Center (2,289); Tampa, FL
November 14, 2019*; 7:00 p.m., LHN	No. 22	UTSA	W 84–53	1–1	Frank Erwin Center (2,913); Austin, TX
November 17, 2019*; 1:00 p.m., LHN	No. 22	Arizona	L 58–83	1–2	Frank Erwin Center (3,147); Austin, TX
November 20, 2019*; 11:00 a.m., LHN		UTRGV	W 85–69	2–2	Frank Erwin Center (7,233); Austin, TX
November 24, 2019*; 1:00 p.m., LHN		Southern	W 93–39	3–2	Frank Erwin Center (2,714); Austin, TX
November 29, 2019*; 6:30 p.m.		vs. No. 12 NC State; Heineken Rainbow Wahine Showdown	L 73–84	3–3	Stan Sheriff Center; Honolulu, HI
November 30, 2019*; 4:00 p.m.		vs. North Texas; Heineken Rainbow Wahine Showdown	W 63–57	4–3	Stan Sheriff Center; Honolulu, HI
December 1, 2019*; 6:30 p.m., Bigwest.tv		at Hawaii; Heineken Rainbow Wahine Showdown	L 60–73	4–4	Stan Sheriff Center; Honolulu, HI
December 8, 2019*; 1:00 p.m., ESPN2		at No. 17 Tennessee; Big 12/SEC Women's Challenge	W 66–60	5–4	Thompson–Boling Arena (9,371); Knoxville, TN
December 18, 2019*; 7:00 p.m., LHN		Ohio	W 73–60	6–4	Frank Erwin Center (3,012); Austin, TX
December 22, 2019*; 12:00 p.m., ESPN2		No. 1 Stanford	W 69–64	7–4	Frank Erwin Center (3,952); Austin, TX
December 29, 2019*; 1:00 p.m, LHN	No. 25	Northwestern State	W 91–49	8–4	Frank Erwin Center (2.999); Austin, TX
Big 12 regular season
January 3, 2020; 6:00 p.m., LHN	No. 25	TCU	L 63–65	8–5 (0–1)	Frank Erwin Center (3,502); Austin, TX
January 6, 2020; 8:00 p.m., FS1		at Iowa State	W 81–75	9–5 (1–1)	Hilton Coliseum (9,259); Ames, IA
January 12, 2020; 12:00 p.m., FSN		at No. 19 West Virginia	L 63–68	9–6 (1–2)	Frank Erwin Center (3,477); Austin, TX
January 15, 2020; 7:00 p.m., LHN		Texas Tech	W 92–66	10–6 (2–2)	Frank Erwin Center (2,797); Austin, TX
January 19, 2020; 12:00 p.m., ESPN+		at Kansas State	W 71–63	11–6 (3–2)	Bramlage Coliseum (4,287); Manhattan, KS
January 22, 2020; 7:00 p.m., LHN		Kansas	W 85–77	12–6 (4–2)	Frank Erwin Center (2,756); Austin, TX
January 25, 2020; 1:00 p.m., FSN		at Oklahoma State	W 61–56	13–6 (5–2)	Gallagher-Iba Arena (1,793); Stillwater, OK
January 28, 2020; 7:00 p.m., FSN		at Oklahoma	W 70–53	14–6 (6–2)	Lloyd Noble Center (1,736); Norman, OK
January 31, 2020; 6:00 p.m., FS1		No. 2 Baylor	L 44–64	14–7 (6–3)	Frank Erwin Center (6,456); Austin, TX
February 9, 2020; 1:00 p.m., ESPNU		at Texas Tech	W 81–66	15–7 (7–3)	United Supermarkets Arena (4,783); Lubbock, TX
February 12, 2020; 7:00 p.m., LHN		Iowa State	L 51–69	15–8 (7–4)	Frank Erwin Center (2,886); Austin, TX
February 15, 2020; 6:00 p.m., ESPN+		at Kansas	L 67–82	15–9 (7–5)	Allen Fieldhouse (2,072); Lawrence, KS
February 17, 2020; 7:30 p.m., FS1		West Virginia	W 50–44	16–9 (8–5)	Frank Erwin Center (2,838); Austin, TX
February 22, 2020; 12:00 p.m., LHN		Kansas State	L 54–60	16–10 (8–6)	Frank Erwin Center (3,392); Austin, TX
February 26, 2020; 6:30 p.m., FSSW+		at No. 25 TCU	W 77–67	17–10 (9–6)	Schollmaier Arena (2,605); Fort Worth, TX
February 29, 2020; 7:00 p.m., LHN		Oklahoma	W 86–76	18–10 (10–6)	Frank Erwin Center (3,543); Austin, TX
March 5, 2020; 7:30 p.m., FS1		at No. 2 Baylor	L 53–69	18–11 (10–7)	Ferrell Center (9,336); Waco, TX
March 8, 2020; 11:30 a.m., LHN		Oklahoma State	W 63–52	19–11 (11–7)	Frank Erwin Center (4,073); Austin, TX
Big 12 Women's Tournament
March 13, 2020; 7:30 pm, FSN	(3)	vs. (6) West Virginia; Quarterfinals	Canceled		Municipal Auditorium; Kansas City, MO
*Non-conference game. ^{#}Rankings from AP Poll. (#) Tournament seedings in parentheses. All times are in Central Time.

== Rankings ==
Regular season polls
Poll	Pre- Season	Week 2	Week 3	Week 4	Week 5	Week 6	Week 7	Week 8	Week 9	Week 10	Week 11	Week 12	Week 13	Week 14	Week 15	Week 16	Week 17	Week 18	Week 19	Final
AP	15	22	RV			RV		25	25	RV			RV							N/A
Coaches	15	RV					RV	RV												

Legend
	Increase in ranking
	Decrease in ranking
	No change
(RV)	Received votes
(NR)	Not ranked

^Coaches did not release a Week 2 poll and the AP does not release a poll after the NCAA tournament, but the Coaches poll does.

== 2019–20 media ==
=== Television and radio information ===
Most University of Texas home games were shown on the Longhorn Network, with national telecasts on the Big 12 Conference's television partners. On the radio, women's basketball games aired on KTXX-HD4 "105.3 The Bat", with select games on KTXX-FM 104.9.

== See also ==
- 2019–20 Texas Longhorns men's basketball team
