= 2019–20 Baylor Lady Bears basketball team =

Intercollegiate basketball season

2019–20 Baylor Lady Bears basketball

Big 12 regular season champions
- Conference: Big 12 Conference

Ranking
- Coaches: No. 2
- AP: No. 3
- Record: 28–2 (17–1 Big 12)
- Head coach: Kim Mulkey (20th season)
- Assistant coaches: Bill Brock; Sytia Messer; Kaylin Rice
- Home arena: Ferrell Center

2019–20 Big 12 Conference women's basketball standings
	Conf.				Overall
Team	W		L	PCT	W		L	PCT
No. 3 Baylor	17	–	1	.944	28	–	2	.933
TCU	13	–	5	.722	22	–	7	.759
Texas	11	–	7	.611	19	–	11	.633
Iowa State	10	–	8	.556	18	–	11	.621
Kansas State	10	–	8	.556	16	–	13	.552
Texas Tech	7	–	11	.389	18	–	11	.621
West Virginia	7	–	11	.389	17	–	12	.586
Oklahoma State	6	–	12	.333	15	–	15	.500
Oklahoma	5	–	13	.278	12	–	18	.400
Kansas	4	–	14	.222	15	–	14	.517
† 2020 Big 12 tournament winner Rankings from AP poll

The 2019–20 Baylor Lady Bears basketball team represented Baylor University in the 2019–20 NCAA Division I women's basketball season. Returning as head coach was Hall of Famer Kim Mulkey for her 20th season. The team played their home games at the Ferrell Center in Waco, Texas and were members of the Big 12 Conference.

== Previous season ==
The Lady Bears finished the 2018–19 season ranked #1 in the nation, with a record of 37–1, 18–0 in Big 12 to win the Big 12 regular season title. They also won the Big 12 women's tournament and earned an automatic bid to the NCAA women's tournament, where they advanced to defeat Notre Dame in the championship game for the third title in team history.

== Roster ==
2019–20 Baylor Bears women's basketball team
Players
Coaches

Pos.	#	Name	Height	Year	Previous school	Hometown
F	1	NaLyssa Smith	6 ft 2 in (1.88 m)	So	East Central HS	Converse, TX
G	2	DiDi Richards	6 ft 1 in (1.85 m)	Jr	Cypress Ranch HS	Cypress, TX
G	3	Trinity Oliver	5 ft 11 in (1.8 m)	RS So	Trinity HS	Euless, TX
G	4	Te'a Cooper	5 ft 8 in (1.73 m)	Sr	South Carolina	Powder Springs GA
F	11	Jordyn Oliver	5 ft 10 in (1.78 m)	Fr	Prosper HS	Prosper, TX
G	12	Moon Ursin	5 ft 7 in (1.7 m)	Jr	Destrehan HS	Destrehan, LA
F	15	Lauren Cox	6 ft 4 in (1.93 m)	Sr	Flower Mound HS	Flower Mound, TX
G	20	Juicy Landrum	5 ft 9 in (1.75 m)	Sr	La Vega HS	Waco, TX
G	22	Erin DeGrate	6 ft 6 in (1.98 m)	Sr	Texas Tech	Waco, TX
C	25	Queen Egbo	6 ft 3 in (1.91 m)	So	Travis HS	Houston, TX
F	51	Caitlin Bickle	6 ft 0 in (1.83 m)	So	Cactus Shadows HS	Cave Creek, AZ

Head coach

- Kim Mulkey (Louisiana Tech)

Assistant coach(es)

- Bill Brock (SE Oklahoma State)
- Sytia Messer (Arkansas)
- Kaylin Rice (Baylor)

Legend

- (C) Team captain
- (S) Suspended
- (I) Ineligible
- (W) Walk-on
- Injured
- Current redshirt

Roster

== Rankings ==
Ranking movements Legend: ██ Increase in ranking ██ Decrease in ranking ( ) = First-place votes
	Week																				
Poll	Pre	1	2	3	4	5	6	7	8	9	10	11	12	13	14	15	16	17	18	19	Final
AP	2 (3)	2 (3)	2 (2)	2 (2)	2 (2)	7	6	7	6	6	6	2 (7)									
Coaches	2 (8)	2 (8)	2^	2 (2)	2 (3)	6	5	5	6	6	6	1 (16)									

^Coaches did not release a Week 2 poll

== Schedule ==
Date time, TV	Rank^{#}	Opponent^{#}	Result	Record	Site (attendance) city, state
Exhibition
Oct 25, 2019*; 7:00 pm	No. 2	Langston	W 149–32		Ferrell Center; Waco, TX
Oct 30, 2019*; 7:00 pm	No. 2	Lubbock Christian	W 98–63		Ferrell Center; Waco, TX
Regular season
Nov 5, 2019*; 6:00 pm, ESPN+	No. 2	New Hampshire	W 97–29	1–0	Ferrell Center (7,606); Waco, TX
Nov 8, 2019*; 6:00 pm, ESPN+	No. 2	Grambling State	W 120–46	2–0	Ferrell Center (7,758); Waco, TX
Nov 14, 2019*; 7:00 pm, ESPN+	No. 2	Houston Baptist	W 112–42	3–0	Ferrell Center (7,539); Waco, TX
Nov 19, 2019*; 7:00 pm, ESPN+	No. 2	No. 22 South Florida	W 58–46	4–0	Ferrell Center (7,485); Waco, TX
Nov 21, 2019*; 7:00 pm, ESPN+	No. 2	Lamar	W 90–28	5–0	Ferrell Center (7,352); Waco, TX
Nov 28, 2019*; 4:45 pm	No. 2	vs. Washington State; Paradise Jam	W 89–66	6–0	Sports and Fitness Center; St. Thomas, VI
Nov 29, 2019*; 4:45 pm	No. 2	vs. No. 17 Indiana; Paradise Jam	W 77–62	7–0	Sports and Fitness Center; St. Thomas, VI
Nov 30, 2019*; 7:00 pm	No. 2	vs. No. 5 South Carolina; Paradise Jam	L 59–74	7–1	Sports and Fitness Center (2,424); St. Thomas, VI
Dec 4, 2019*; 7:00 pm, ESPN+	No. 7	Georgia; Big 12/SEC Women's Challenge	W 72–38	8–1	Ferrell Center (8,172); Waco, TX
Dec 18, 2019*; Noon, ESPN+	No. 7	Arkansas State	W 111–43	9–1	Ferrell Center (10,284); Waco, TX
Dec 30, 2019*; 7:00 pm, ESPN+	No. 6	Morehead State	W 94–47	10–1	Ferrell Center (8,221); Waco, TX
Jan 4, 2020; 4:00 pm	No. 6	at Oklahoma	W 77–56	11–1 (1–0)	Lloyd Noble Center (3,186); Norman, OK
Jan 9, 2020*; 6:00 pm, ESPN	No. 6	at No. 1 UConn	W 74–58	12–1	XL Center (12,415); Hartford, CT
Jan 12, 2020; 1:00 pm, ESPNU	No. 6	Oklahoma State	W 94–48	13–1 (2–0)	Ferrell Center (6,289); Waco, TX
Jan 15, 2020; 7:00 pm	No. 2	at Kansas	W 90–47	14–1 (3–0)	Allen Fieldhouse (1,500); Lawrence, KS
Jan 18, 2020; 7:00 pm, FS1	No. 2	No. 17 West Virginia	W 91–51	15–1 (4–0)	Ferrell Center (7,004); Waco, TX
Jan 22, 2020; 6:30 pm	No. 2	at TCU	W 63–57	16–1 (5–0)	Schollmaier Arena (3,829); Fort Worth, TX
Jan 25, 2020; 2:00 pm, ESPN+	No. 2	Texas Tech	W 87–79	17–1 (6–0)	Ferrell Center (7,098); Waco, TX
Jan 28, 2020; 7:30 pm, FS1	No. 2	Iowa State	W 83–62	18–1 (7–0)	Ferrell Center (8,627); Waco, TX
Jan 31, 2020; 6:00 pm, FS1	No. 2	at Texas	W 64–44	19–1 (8–0)	Frank Erwin Center (6,456); Austin, TX
Feb 5, 2020; 7:00 pm, ESPN+	No. 2	Kansas	W 97–44	20–1 (9–0)	Ferrell Center (8,265); Waco, TX
Feb 8, 2020; 2:00 pm, ESPN+	No. 2	at Kansas State	W 54–40	21–1 (10–0)	Bramlage Coliseum (3,505); Manhattan, KS
Feb 12, 2020; 7:00 pm, ESPN+	No. 2	TCU	W 81–62	22–1 (11–0)	Ferrell Center (8,271); Waco, TX
Feb 15, 2020; 7:00 pm	No. 2	at Oklahoma State	W 69–42	23–1 (12–0)	Gallagher-Iba Arena (2,818); Stillwater, OK
Feb 18, 2020; 7:00 pm, FSN	No. 2	at Texas Tech	W 77–62	24–1 (13–0)	United Supermarkets Arena (5,043); Lubbock, TX
Feb 22, 2020; 4:00 pm, FS1	No. 2	Oklahoma	W 101–69	25–1 (14–0)	Ferrell Center (8,508); Waco, TX
Feb 24, 2020; 6:00 pm, FS1	No. 2	at West Virginia	W 64–39	26–1 (15–0)	WVU Coliseum (2,146); Morgantown, WV
Feb 29, 2020; 6:00 pm, ESPN+	No. 2	Kansas State	W 83–58	27–1 (16–0)	Ferrell Center (6,976); Waco, TX
Mar 5, 2020; 7:30 pm, FS1	No. 2	Texas	W 69–53	28–1 (17–0)	Ferrell Center (9,336); Waco, TX
Mar 8, 2020; Noon, FSN	No. 2	at Iowa State	L 56–57	28–2 (17–1)	Hilton Coliseum (10,068); Ames, IA
Big 12 Women's Tournament
March 13, 2019; 1:30 pm, FSN	(1) No. 3	vs. (8/9) Oklahoma/Oklahoma State; Quarterfinals	Canceled		Municipal Auditorium; Kansas City, MO
*Non-conference game. ^{#}Rankings from AP Poll. (#) Tournament seedings in parentheses. All times are in Central Time.
