= 2019–20 TCU Horned Frogs women's basketball team =

Intercollegiate basketball season

2019–20 TCU Horned Frogs women's basketball
- Conference: Big 12 Conference

Ranking
- Coaches: No. RV
- AP: No. RV
- Record: 22–7 (13–5 Big 12)
- Head coach: Raegan Pebley (6th season)
- Assistant coaches: Hanna Howard; Britney Brown; Abi Olajuwon
- Home arena: Schollmaier Arena

2019–20 Big 12 Conference women's basketball standings
	Conf.				Overall
Team	W		L	PCT	W		L	PCT
No. 3 Baylor	17	–	1	.944	28	–	2	.933
TCU	13	–	5	.722	22	–	7	.759
Texas	11	–	7	.611	19	–	11	.633
Iowa State	10	–	8	.556	18	–	11	.621
Kansas State	10	–	8	.556	16	–	13	.552
Texas Tech	7	–	11	.389	18	–	11	.621
West Virginia	7	–	11	.389	17	–	12	.586
Oklahoma State	6	–	12	.333	15	–	15	.500
Oklahoma	5	–	13	.278	12	–	18	.400
Kansas	4	–	14	.222	15	–	14	.517
† 2020 Big 12 tournament winner Rankings from AP poll

The 2019–20 TCU Horned Frogs women's basketball team represented Texas Christian University in the 2019–20 NCAA Division I women's basketball season. The 2019–20 season is head coach Raegan Pebley's sixth season at TCU. The Horned Frogs were members of the Big 12 Conference and played their home games in Schollmaier Arena.

The Horned Frogs finished the season 22–7, 13–5 in Big 12 play to finish in second place. The Big 12 Tournament, NCAA women's basketball tournament and WNIT were all cancelled before they began due to the COVID-19 pandemic.

== Previous season ==
The Horned Frogs finished the season 24–11, 10–8 in Big 12 play to finish in sixth place. They lost in the quarterfinals of the Big 12 women's tournament to Texas. They received an at-large bid to the Women's National Invitation Tournament where they defeated Prairie View A&M, UT Arlington, Arkansas in the first, second and third rounds, Cincinnati in the quarterfinals before losing to Arizona in the semifinals.

== Roster ==
2019–20 TCU Horned Frogs women's basketball team
Players
Coaches

Pos.	#	Name	Height	Year	Previous school	Hometown
G	1	Ryann Payne	5 ft 6 in (1.68 m)	So	Sierra Canyon	Valencia, CA
C	2	Becky Obinma	6 ft 3 in (1.91 m)	RS Fr	Rosary Academy	Menifee, CA
F	5	Yummy Morris	6 ft 3 in (1.91 m)	So	North Little Rock	North Little Rock, AR
G	10	Jaycee Bradley	5 ft 10 in (1.78 m)	RS Sr	Norfolk; South Dakota	Norfolk, NE
G/F	11	Maddi Puli	6 ft 2 in (1.88 m)	Fr	MacKillop College	Werribee, Australia
G	13	Tavy Diggs	6 ft 2 in (1.88 m)	Fr	Plano East	Richardson, TX
G	15	Jayde Woods	6 ft 1 in (1.85 m)	Sr	Windward School; Oregon	Yorba Linda, CA
G	20	Lauren Heard	5 ft 9 in (1.75 m)	Jr	Guyer	Denton, TX
F	21	Alexandria Crain	5 ft 9 in (1.75 m)	So	Dallas Thunder	McKinney, TX
F	23	Michelle Berry	6 ft 2 in (1.88 m)	Sr	Miami Country Day; Virginia Tech	Miami, Florida
G	25	Kianna Ray	6 ft 1 in (1.85 m)	Sr	Bowie	Austin, TX
F	31	Ella Hellessey	6 ft 2 in (1.88 m)	Sr	Padua College	Dromana, Australia
F	33	Adeola Akomolafe	6 ft 3 in (1.91 m)	RS Sr	El Dorado	El Paso, TX

Head coach

- Raegan Pebley (Colorado)

Assistant coach(es)

- Hanna Howard (Portland)
- Britney Brown (Oklahoma)
- Abi Olajuwon (Oklahoma)

Legend

- (C) Team captain
- (S) Suspended
- (I) Ineligible
- (W) Walk-on
- Injured
- Current redshirt

Roster
Last update: April 30, 2020

== Schedule and results ==
Date time, TV	Rank^{#}	Opponent^{#}	Result	Record	Site (attendance) city, state
Non-conference regular season
November 5, 2019*; 12:00 p.m., HFTV		Robert Morris	W 66–61	1–0	Schollmaier Arena (3,922); Fort Worth, TX
November 10, 2019*; 1:00 p.m., HFTV		Cornell	W 59–49	2–0	Schollmaier Arena (1,755); Fort Worth, TX
November 14, 2019*; 6:30 p.m., HFTV		Nicholls State	W 72–47	3–0	Schollmaier Arena (1,800); Fort Worth, TX
November 20, 2019*; 7:00 p.m., Ponyup TV		at SMU	W 57–56	4–0	Moody Coliseum (658); University Park, TX
November 26, 2019*; 4:00 p.m.		at Army	W 66–52	5–0	Christl Arena (533); West Point, NY
December 1, 2019*; 5:00 p.m., FSSW+		Boise State; Maggie Dixon Classic	W 77–65	6–0	Schollmaier Arena (1,500); Fort Worth, TX
December 7, 2019*; 2:00 p.m., HFTV		Auburn; Big 12/SEC Women's Challenge	W 80–65	7–0	Schollmaier Arena (2,259); Fort Worth, TX
December 11, 2019*; 7:00 p.m., SECN+		at No. 11 Texas A&M	L 68–70	7–1	Reed Arena (3,015); College Station, TX
December 15, 2019*; 2:00 p.m., HFTV		Ohio	W 79–72	8–1	Schollmaier Arena (1,730); Fort Worth, TX
December 22, 2019*; 12:00 p.m., HFTV		Texas State	W 79–52	9–1	Schollmaier Arena (1,699); Fort Worth, TX
December 29, 2019*; 1:00 p.m., ESPN+		at Middle Tennessee	L 70–82	9–2	Murphy Center (2,806); Murfreesboro, TN
Big 12 regular season
January 3, 2020; 6:00 p.m., LHN		at No. 25 Texas	W 65–63	10–2 (1–0)	Frank Erwin Center (3,502); Austin, TX
January 8, 2020; 6:30 p.m., HFTV		Texas Tech	L 76–80	10–3 (1–1)	Schollmaier Arena (2,292); Fort Worth, TX
January 12, 2020; 2:00 p.m., FSSW		Kansas	W 73–59	11–3 (2–1)	Schollmaier Arena (2,590); Fort Worth, TX
January 15, 2020; 6:30 p.m., Cyclones.TV		at Iowa State	W 77–74	12–3 (3–1)	Hilton Coliseum (9,527); Ames, IA
January 19, 2020; 3:00 p.m., FSOK		at Oklahoma	W 82–63	13–3 (4–1)	Lloyd Noble Center (2,594); Norma, OK
January 22, 2020; 6:30 p.m., HFTV		No. 2 Baylor	L 57–66	13–4 (4–2)	Schollmaier Arena (3,829); Fort Worth, TX
January 26, 2020; 7:30 p.m., FS1		No. 25 West Virginia	W 73–60	14–4 (5–2)	Schollmaier Arena (1,722); Fort Worth, TX
January 29, 2020; 7:00 p.m., ESPN+		at Oklahoma State	W 72–68	15–4 (6–2)	Gallagher-Iba Arena (1,689); Stillwater, OK
February 1, 2020; 1:00 p.m., FSSW		Kansas State	W 65–61	16–4 (7–2)	Schollmaier Arena (2,236); Fort Worth, TX
February 8, 2020; 5:00 p.m., ESPN+		at Kansas	W 87–74	17–4 (8–2)	Allen Fieldhouse (1,773); Lawrence, KS
February 12, 2020; 7:00 p.m., ESPN+		at No. 2 Baylor	L 62–81	17–5 (8–3)	Ferrell Center (8,271); Waco, TX
February 16, 2020; 12:00 p.m., FSN		Iowa State	W 82–72	18–5 (9–3)	Schollmaier Arena (2,116); Fort Worth, TX
February 19, 2020; 6:30 p.m., ESPN+		at Kansas State	W 82–72	19–5 (10–3)	Bramlage Coliseum (3,268); Manhattan, KS
February 23, 2020; 2:00 p.m., FSSW+		Oklahoma State	W 49–37	20–5 (11–3)	Schollmaier Arena (2,731); Fort Worth, TX
February 26, 2020; 6:30 p.m., FSSW+	No. 25	Texas	L 67–77	20–6 (11–4)	Schollmaier Arena (2,605); Fort Worth, TX
March 1, 2020; 12:00 p.m., FSN	No. 25	at Texas Tech	L 83–87	20–7 (11–5)	United Supermarkets Arena (4,204); Lubbock, TX
March 4, 2020; 6:00 p.m., FSSW+		Oklahoma	W 96–71	21–7 (12–5)	Schollmaier Arena (3,050); Fort Worth, TX
March 7, 2020; 5:00 p.m., Nexstar		at West Virginia	W 77–63	22–7 (13–5)	WVU Coliseum (2,680); Morgantown, WV
Big 12 Women's Tournament
March 13, 2020; 5:00 p.m., FSN	(2)	vs. (7/10) Texas Tech/Kansas; Quarterfinals	Canceled		Municipal Auditorium; Kansas City, MO
*Non-conference game. ^{#}Rankings from AP Poll. (#) Tournament seedings in parentheses. All times are in Central Time.

== Rankings ==
Regular season polls
Poll	Pre- Season	Week 2	Week 3	Week 4	Week 5	Week 6	Week 7	Week 8	Week 9	Week 10	Week 11	Week 12	Week 13	Week 14	Week 15	Week 16	Week 17	Week 18	Week 19	Final
AP					RV	RV	RV	RV		RV			RV	RV	RV	RV	25	RV	RV	RV
Coaches							RV						RV	RV	RV	RV	25	RV	RV	RV

Legend
	Increase in ranking
	Decrease in ranking
	Not ranked previous week
(RV)	Received Votes

== See also ==
- 2019–20 TCU Horned Frogs men's basketball team
