= 2019–20 Iowa State Cyclones women's basketball team =

Intercollegiate basketball season

2019–20 Iowa State Cyclones women's basketball
- Conference: Big 12 Conference

Ranking
- AP: No. RV
- Record: 18–11 (10–8 Big 12)
- Head coach: Bill Fennelly (25th season)
- Assistant coaches: Jodi Steyer; Latoja Schaben; Billy Fennelly
- Home arena: Hilton Coliseum

2019–20 Big 12 Conference women's basketball standings
	Conf.				Overall
Team	W		L	PCT	W		L	PCT
No. 3 Baylor	17	–	1	.944	28	–	2	.933
TCU	13	–	5	.722	22	–	7	.759
Texas	11	–	7	.611	19	–	11	.633
Iowa State	10	–	8	.556	18	–	11	.621
Kansas State	10	–	8	.556	16	–	13	.552
Texas Tech	7	–	11	.389	18	–	11	.621
West Virginia	7	–	11	.389	17	–	12	.586
Oklahoma State	6	–	12	.333	15	–	15	.500
Oklahoma	5	–	13	.278	12	–	18	.400
Kansas	4	–	14	.222	15	–	14	.517
† 2020 Big 12 tournament winner Rankings from AP poll

The 2019–20 Iowa State Cyclones women's basketball team represented Iowa State University during the 2019–20 NCAA Division I women's basketball season. The Cyclones were coached by Bill Fennelly, who was in his 25th season at Iowa State. They played their home games at Hilton Coliseum in Ames, Iowa, as members of the Big 12 Conference.

They finished the season 18–11, 10–8 in Big 12 play to finish in a tie for fourth place. The Big 12 Tournament, NCAA women's basketball tournament and WNIT were all cancelled before they began, due to the COVID-19 pandemic.

== Previous season ==
The Cyclones finished the 2019–19 season 26–9, 13–5 in Big 12 play to finish in second place. They advanced to the championship game of the Big 12 women's tournament, where they lost to Baylor. They received an at-large bid to the NCAA women's tournament, where they defeated New Mexico State in the first round before being upset by Missouri State in the second round.

== Roster ==
2018–19 Iowa State Cyclones women's basketball team
Players
Coaches

Pos.	#	Name	Height	Year	Previous school	Hometown
F	1	Madison Wise	6 ft 1 in (1.85 m)	Jr	Greenfield-Central	Greenfield, IN
G	4	Rae Johnson	5 ft 7 in (1.7 m)	Jr	St. Michael-Albertville	Albertville, MN
G	10	Nia Washington	5 ft 7 in (1.7 m)	Sr	Riverdale Baptist	Stafford, VA
G	11	Jade Washington	5 ft 8 in (1.73 m)	Sr	Kilgore College	Lancaster, TX
F	13	Adriana Camber	5 ft 10 in (1.78 m)	Sr	Katedralskolan	Lund, Sweden
F/C	14	Lauren Mills	6 ft 2 in (1.88 m)	RS So	Rosny College	Hobart, Australia
F	15	Inès Nezerwa	6 ft 3 in (1.91 m)	RS Sr	Jacksonville College	Bujumbura, Burundi
G	23	Maddie Frederick	6 ft 0 in (1.83 m)	RS Fr	Tippecanoe	Tipp, OH
G	24	Ashley Joens	6 ft 0 in (1.83 m)	So	Iowa City	Iowa City, IA
C	25	Kristan Scott	6 ft 3 in (1.91 m)	Jr	Kasson-Mantorville	Kasson, MN
F	31	Morgan Kane	6 ft 3 in (1.91 m)	RS Fr	Riverton	West Jordan, UT
G	32	Maggie Espenmiller-McGraw	5 ft 10 in (1.78 m)	Fr	Southeast Polk	Indianola, IA
G	42	Gabby McBride	6 ft 2 in (1.88 m)	Fr	Liberty Christian	Roanoke, TX
F/C	50	Lindsey Jarosinski	6 ft 5 in (1.96 m)	RS So	Montini Catholic; Wake Forest	Medinah, IL

Head coach

- Bill Fennelly (William Penn)

Assistant coach(es)

- Jodi Steyer (Colorado State)
- Latoja Schaben (Toledo)
- Billy Fennelly (Iowa State)

Legend

- (C) Team captain
- (S) Suspended
- (I) Ineligible
- (W) Walk-on
- Injured
- Current redshirt

Roster
Last update: May 1, 2020

== Schedule and results ==
Date time, TV	Rank^{#}	Opponent^{#}	Result	Record	Site (attendance) city, state
Exhibition
October 30, 2020*; 6:30 p.m.		Missouri Western State	W 87–54	–	Hilton Coliseum; Ames, IA
Non-conference regular season
November 7, 2019*; 6:30 p.m., Cyclones.TV		Southern	W 69–36	1–0	Hilton Coliseum (9,225); Ames, IA
November 10, 2019*; 2:00 p.m., ESPN+		at Drake	L 81–86	1–1	Knapp Center (4,647); Des Moines, IA
November 19, 2019*; 11:00 a.m., Cyclones.TV		Texas Southern	W 79–59	2–1	Hilton Coliseum (9,238); Ames, IA
November 22, 2019*; 7:00 p.m., MC22		at North Dakota State	W 86–58	3–1	Scheels Center (604); Fargo, ND
November 29, 2019*; 6:30 p.m., Cyclones.TV		Arkansas-Pine Bluff	W 90–40	4–1	Hilton Coliseum (9,318); Ames, IA
December 1, 2019*; 1:00 p.m., Cyclones.TV		New Orleans	W 71–53	5–1	Hilton Coliseum (9,266); Ames, IA
December 5, 2019*; 6:00 p.m., SECN		at Alabama; Big 12/SEC Women's Challenge	W 75–66	6–1	Coleman Coliseum (1,915); Tuscaloosa, AL
December 11, 2019*; 7:00 p.m., FS1		Iowa; Iowa Corn Cy-Hawk Series	L 69–75	6–2	Hilton Coliseum (10,196); Ames, IA
December 15, 2019*; 1:00 p.m., Cyclones.TV		Wright State	W 79–71	7–2	Hilton Coliseum (9,395); Ames, IA
December 22, 2019*; 5:00 p.m., Cyclones.TV		Northern Iowa	L 63–71	7–3	Hilton Coliseum (10,095); Ames, IA
December 30, 2019*; 6:30 p.m., Cyclones.TV		North Alabama	W 80–72	8–3	Hilton Coliseum (9,478); Ames, IA
Big 12 Conference season
January 3, 2020; 7:00 p.m., FSSW		at Texas Tech	W 96–66	9–3 (1–0)	United Supermarkets Arena (5,137); Lubbock, TX
January 6, 2020; 8:00 p.m., FS1		Texas	L 75–81	9–4 (1–1)	Hilton Coliseum (9,259); Ames, IA
January 11, 2020; 1:00 p.m., FSOK		at Oklahoma	L 72–81	9–5 (1–2)	Lloyd Noble Center (2,363); Norman, OK
January 15, 2020; 6:30 p.m., Cyclones.TV		TCU	L 74–77	9–6 (1–3)	Hilton Coliseum (9,527); Ames, IA
January 19, 2020; 2:00 p.m., ESPN+		at Oklahoma State	W 64–63	10–6 (2–3)	Gallagher-Iba Arena (1,835); Stillwater, OK
January 22, 2020; 6:30 p.m., Cyclones.TV		Kansas State	W 73–59	11–6 (3–3)	Hilton Coliseum (9,469); Ames, IA
January 25, 2020; 2:00 p.m., Cyclones.TV		Kansas	W 89–67	12–6 (4–3)	Hilton Coliseum (9,833); Ames, IA
January 28, 2020; 7:30 p.m., FS1		at No. 2 Baylor	L 62–83	12–7 (4–4)	Ferrell Center (8,627); Waco, TX
February 2, 2020; 1:00 p.m., ESPNU		at West Virginia	L 71–79	12–8 (4–5)	WVU Coliseum (2,742); Morgantown, WV
February 5, 2020; 6:30 p.m., Cyclones.TV		Oklahoma State	W 74–63	13–8 (5–5)	Hilton Coliseum (9,383); Ames, IA
February 8, 2020; 2:00 p.m., Cyclones.TV		Oklahoma	W 63–59	14–8 (6–5)	Hilton Coliseum (10,153); Ames, IA
February 12, 2020; 7:00 p.m., LHN		at Texas	W 69–51	15–8 (7–5)	Frank Erwin Center (2,886); Austin, TX
February 16, 2020; 12:00 p.m., FSN		at TCU	L 72–82	15–9 (7–6)	Schollmaier Arena (2,116); Fort Worth, TX
February 23, 2020; 2:00 p.m., Cyclones.TV		Texas Tech	L 74–77	15–10 (7–7)	Hilton Coliseum (10,933); Ames, IA
February 26, 2020; 6:30 p.m., ESPN+		at Kansas State	L 51–60	15–11 (7–8)	Bramlage Coliseum (3,006); Manhattan, KS
February 29, 2020; 12:00 p.m., Cyclones.TV		West Virginia	W 61–58	16–11 (8–8)	Hilton Coliseum (9,894); Ames, IA
March 3, 2020; 7:00 p.m., ESPN+		at Kansas	W 61–42	17–11 (9–8)	Allen Fieldhouse (1,689); Lawrence, KS
March 8, 2020; 12:00 p.m., FSN		No. 2 Baylor	W 57–56	18–11 (10–8)	Hilton Coliseum (10,068); Ames, IA
Big 12 Tournament
March 13, 2020; 11:00 a.m., FSN	(4)	vs. (5) Kansas State; Quarterfinals	Canceled		Municipal Auditorium; Kansas City, Missouri
*Non-conference game. ^{#}Rankings from AP Poll. (#) Tournament seedings in parentheses. All times are in Central Time.

== Rankings ==
Ranking movements Legend: ██ Increase in ranking ██ Decrease in ranking — = Not ranked RV = Received votes т = Tied with team above or below
	Week																				
Poll	Pre	1	2	3	4	5	6	7	8	9	10	11	12	13	14	15	16	17	18	19	Final
AP	RV	RV	—																	RV	RV
Coaches	25-T	—	RV	RV	RV	RV	—														Not released

Coaches' Poll did not release a second poll at the same time as the AP.

== See also ==
- 2019–20 Iowa State Cyclones men's basketball team
