= 2019–20 West Virginia Mountaineers women's basketball team =

American college basketball season

2019–20 West Virginia Mountaineers women's basketball
- Conference: Big 12 Conference
- Record: 17–12 (7–11 Big 12)
- Head coach: Mike Carey (19th season)
- Assistant coaches: Bett Shelby; Craig Carey; Christal Caldwell
- Home arena: WVU Coliseum

2019–20 Big 12 Conference women's basketball standings
	Conf.				Overall
Team	W		L	PCT	W		L	PCT
No. 3 Baylor	17	–	1	.944	28	–	2	.933
TCU	13	–	5	.722	22	–	7	.759
Texas	11	–	7	.611	19	–	11	.633
Iowa State	10	–	8	.556	18	–	11	.621
Kansas State	10	–	8	.556	16	–	13	.552
Texas Tech	7	–	11	.389	18	–	11	.621
West Virginia	7	–	11	.389	17	–	12	.586
Oklahoma State	6	–	12	.333	15	–	15	.500
Oklahoma	5	–	13	.278	12	–	18	.400
Kansas	4	–	14	.222	15	–	14	.517
† 2020 Big 12 tournament winner Rankings from AP poll

The 2019–20 West Virginia Mountaineers women's basketball team represented West Virginia University during the 2019–20 NCAA Division I women's basketball season. The Mountaineers were coached by nineteenth-year head coach Mike Carey, played their home games at WVU Coliseum and were members of the Big 12 Conference.

They finished the season 17–12, 7–11 in Big 12 play to finish in a tie for sixth place. The Big 12 Tournament, NCAA women's basketball tournament and WNIT were all cancelled before they began due to the COVID-19 pandemic.

== Previous season ==
The Mountaineers finished the season 22–11, 11–7 in Big 12 play to finish in a tie for fourth place. They lost in the quarterfinals of the Big 12 women's tournament to Kansas State. They received an automatic bid to the Women's National Invitation Tournament where they defeated Rider and Villanova in the first and second rounds before losing to Northwestern in the third round.

== Roster ==
2019–20 West Virginia Mountaineers women's basketball team
Players
Coaches

Pos.	#	Name	Height	Year	Previous school	Hometown
G	2	Kysre Gondrezick	5 ft 9 in (1.75 m)	RS Jr	Benton Harbor; Michigan	Benton Harbor, MI
G	3	Kirsten Deans	5 ft 8 in (1.73 m)	Fr	Connections Academy	Greensboro, NC
G	15	Lucky Rudd	5 ft 10 in (1.78 m)	Sr	New Hope Christian Academy; NC State	Thomasville, NC
G	5	Tynice Martin	5 ft 11 in (1.8 m)	RS Sr	Southwest Atlanta Christian Academy	Atlanta, GA
F	12	Esmery Martínez	6 ft 2 in (1.88 m)	Fr	Hamilton Heights Christian	Hato Mayor del Rey, Dominican Republic
F	14	Kari Niblack	6 ft 1 in (1.85 m)	So	Wildwood	Leesburg, FL
C	22	Blessing Ejiofor	6 ft 5 in (1.96 m)	Jr	Paterson Eastside; Chipola CC	Ebonyi, Nigeria
G	24	Arleighshya McElroy	5 ft 8 in (1.73 m)	Jr	Richardson; Trinity Valley	Dallas, TX
G	30	Madisen Smith	5 ft 5 in (1.65 m)	So	Greenville Senior	Greenville, SC
C	31	Rochelle Norris	6 ft 5 in (1.96 m)	RS Fr	New Hope Academy	Stafford, VA
F	35	De'Janae Boykin	6 ft 2 in (1.88 m)	Sr	Charles Herbert Flowers; Penn State	Springdale, MD

Head coach

- Mike Carey (Salem)

Assistant coach(es)

- Bett Shelby (Greensboro)
- Craig Carey (West Virginia)
- Christal Caldwell (West Virginia)

Legend

- (C) Team captain
- (S) Suspended
- (I) Ineligible
- (W) Walk-on
- Injured
- Current redshirt

Roster
Last update: April 9, 2020

== Schedule ==
Date time, TV	Rank^{#}	Opponent^{#}	Result	Record	Site (attendance) city, state
Exhibition
October 29, 2019*; 7:00 p.m.		Salem	W 91–40	–	WVU Coliseum (3,103); Morgantown, WV
Non-conference regular season
November 7, 2019*; 7:00 p.m.		Saint Francis	W 74–45	1–0	WVU Coliseum (1,197); Morgantown, WV
November 10, 2019*; 2:00 p.m.		Presbyterian	W 56–40	2–0	WVU Coliseum (1,382); Morgantown, WV
November 17, 2019*; 2:00 p.m.		at Radford	W 74–37	3–0	WVU Coliseum (2,117); Morgantown, WV
November 21, 2019*; 10:00 a.m.	No. 25	Coppin State	W 82–47	4–0	WVU Coliseum (10,663); Morgantown, WV
November 28, 2019*; 5:30 p.m.	No. 23	vs. Creighton; Cancún Challenge	L 75–82	4–1	Hard Rock Hotel Riviera (187); Cancún, Mexico
November 29, 2019*; 2:00 p.m.	No. 23	vs. New Mexico; Cancún Challenge	W 73–60	5–1	Hard Rock Hotel Riviera (107); Cancún, Mexico
December 8, 2019*; 1:00 p.m., SECN		at No. 10 Mississippi State; Big 12/SEC Women's Challenge	W 71–65	6–1	Humphrey Coliseum (7,113); Starkville, MS
December 15, 2019*; 4:00 p.m.	No. 22	vs. Norfolk State	W 72–55	7–1	Charleston Civic Center (1,842); Charleston, WV
December 21, 2019*; 1:30 p.m., FloHoops	No. 22	vs. No. 19 Michigan State; Florida Sunshine Classic	W 63–57	8–1	Alfond Sports Center (329); Orlando, FL
December 22, 2019*; 1:30 p.m., FloHoops	No. 22	vs. Syracuse; Florida Sunshine Classic	W 71–69	9–1	Alfond Sports Center (274); Orlando, FL
December 31, 2019*; 4:00 p.m.	No. 19	Cornell	W 68–62	10–1	WVU Coliseum (1,987); Morgantown, WV
Big 12 regular season
January 5, 2020; 12:00 p.m.	No. 19	at Kansas State	W 74–63	11–1 (1–0)	Bramlage Coliseum (2,737); Manhattan, KS
January 8, 2020; 7:00 p.m.	No. 19	at Kansas	W 68–49	12–1 (2–0)	Allen Fieldhouse (1,313); Lawrence, KS
January 12, 2020; 1:00 p.m., FSN	No. 19	Texas	W 68–63	13–1 (3–0)	WVU Coliseum (3,477); Morgantown, WV
January 15, 2020; 7:00 p.m.	No. 17	Oklahoma	L 49–73	13–2 (3–1)	WVU Coliseum (1,566); Morgantown, WV
January 18, 2020; 7:00 p.m., FS1	No. 17	at No. 2 Baylor	L 51–91	13–3 (3–2)	Ferrell Center (7,004); Waco, TX
January 22, 2020; 7:00 p.m.	No. 25	Oklahoma State	L 55–57	13–4 (3–3)	WVU Coliseum (1,349); Morgantown, WV
January 26, 2020; 7:30 p.m.	No. 25	at TCU	L 60–73	13–5 (3–4)	Schollmaier Arena (1,722); Fort Worth, TX
February 2, 2020; 1:00 p.m.		Iowa State	W 79–71	14–5 (4–4)	WVU Coliseum (2,742); Morgantown, WV
February 5, 2020; 7:00 p.m.		at Oklahoma	L 58–68	14–6 (4–5)	Lloyd Noble Center (709); Norman, OK
February 8, 2020; 2:00 p.m.		at Oklahoma State	L 57–60	14–7 (4–6)	Gallagher-Iba Arena (1,803); Stillwater, OK
February 11, 2020; 7:00 p.m.		Kansas State	L 55–56	14–8 (4–7)	WVU Coliseum (1,455); Morgantown, WV
February 15, 2020; 5:00 p.m.		Texas Tech	W 67–60	15–8 (5–7)	WVU Coliseum (2,617); Morgantown, WV
February 17, 2020; 7:30 p.m., FS1		at Texas	L 44–50	15–9 (5–8)	Frank Erwin Center (2,838); Austin, TX
Febaruary 22, 2020; 5:00 p.m.		Kansas	W 60–53	16–9 (6–8)	WVU Coliseum (3,135); Morgantown, WV
February 24, 2020; 7:00 p.m., FS1		No. 2 Baylor	L 39–64	16–10 (6–9)	WVU Coliseum (2,146); Morgantown, WV
February 29, 2020; 12:00 p.m.		at Iowa State	L 58–61	16–11 (6–10)	Hilton Coliseum (9,864); Ames, IA
March 4, 2020; 8:00 p.m.		at Texas Tech	W 71–69	17–11 (7–10)	United Supermarkets Arena (3,846); Lubbock, TX
March 7, 2020; 6:00 p.m.		TCU	L 63–77	17–12 (7–11)	WVU Coliseum (2,680); Morgantown, WV
Big 12 Women's Tournament
March 13, 2020; 7:30 p.m., FSN	(6)	vs. (3) Texas; Quarterfinals	Canceled		Municipal Auditorium; Kansas City, MO
*Non-conference game. ^{#}Rankings from AP Poll. (#) Tournament seedings in parentheses. All times are in Eastern Time.

== Rankings ==
Ranking movements Legend: ██ Increase in ranking ██ Decrease in ranking — = Not ranked RV = Received votes
	Week																			
Poll	Pre	1	2	3	4	5	6	7	8	9	10	11	12	13	14	15	16	17	18	Final
AP	RV	RV	25	23	RV	22	22	19	19	19	17	25	RV	—						
Coaches	RV	RV	RV	RV	25	25	21	21	20	18	RV	—	RV	—						
