= 2019–20 Kansas Jayhawks women's basketball team =

Women's college basketball season

2019–20 Kansas Jayhawks women's basketball

FAU Thanksgiving Tournament Champions
- Conference: Big 12 Conference
- Record: 15–14 (4–14 Big 12)
- Head coach: Brandon Schneider (5th season)
- Assistant coaches: Larry Tidwell; Damitria Buchanan; Jhasmin Player
- Home arena: Allen Fieldhouse

2019–20 Big 12 Conference women's basketball standings
	Conf.				Overall
Team	W		L	PCT	W		L	PCT
No. 3 Baylor	17	–	1	.944	28	–	2	.933
TCU	13	–	5	.722	22	–	7	.759
Texas	11	–	7	.611	19	–	11	.633
Iowa State	10	–	8	.556	18	–	11	.621
Kansas State	10	–	8	.556	16	–	13	.552
Texas Tech	7	–	11	.389	18	–	11	.621
West Virginia	7	–	11	.389	17	–	12	.586
Oklahoma State	6	–	12	.333	15	–	15	.500
Oklahoma	5	–	13	.278	12	–	18	.400
Kansas	4	–	14	.222	15	–	14	.517
† 2020 Big 12 tournament winner Rankings from AP poll

The 2019–20 Kansas Jayhawks women's basketball team represented the University of Kansas in the 2019–20 NCAA Division I women's basketball season. The Jayhawks were led by fifth year head coach Brandon Schneider. They played their home games at Allen Fieldhouse in Lawrence, Kansas as members of the Big 12 Conference.

They finished the season 15–14, 4–14 in Big 12 play to finish in last place. The Big 12 Tournament, NCAA women's basketball tournament and WNIT were all cancelled before they began due to the COVID-19 pandemic.

== Previous season ==
The Jayhawks finished the season 13–18, 2–16 in Big 12 play to finish in last place. They advanced in the quarterfinals of the Big 12 Tournament where they lost to Iowa State.

== Roster ==
2019–20 Kansas Jayhawks women's basketball team
Players
Coaches

Pos.	#	Name	Height	Year	Previous school	Hometown
G	0	Erica Haynes-Overton	5 ft 5 in (1.65 m)	Jr	East Nashville Magnetl; East Tennessee State	Nashville, TN
F	1	Tina Stephens	6 ft 2 in (1.88 m)	Jr	Palmetto; Florida Southwestern State	Palmetto, FL
G	2	Brianna Osorio	5 ft 8 in (1.73 m)	Sr	Quest Academy; Southern Idaho	Las Vegas, NV
G	3	Tamia Davis	5 ft 7 in (1.7 m)	Fr	Southeast Raleigh	Raleigh, NC
F	4	Mariane de Carvalho	6 ft 2 in (1.88 m)	Sr	Highland CC	Araraquara, Brazil
G	5	Aniya Thomas	5 ft 7 in (1.7 m)	So	Duncanville	Duncanville, TX
C	10	Emma Merriweather	6 ft 5 in (1.96 m)	RS So	Lakeside; Texas Tech	Buena Park, CA
G	11	Niccolly Ramalho	5 ft 5 in (1.65 m)	Sr	Highland CC	São Paulo, Brazil
G	13	Holly Kersgieter	5 ft 10 in (1.78 m)	Fr	Charles Page	Sand Springs, OK
G	15	Zakiyah Franklin	5 ft 7 in (1.7 m)	Fr	Winter Haven	Lakeland, FL
G	21	Brooklyn Mitchell	5 ft 6 in (1.68 m)	So	Ursuline Academy	New Orleans, LA
G	25	Chandler Prater	5 ft 11 in (1.8 m)	Fr	Kansas City	Kansas City, MO
C	31	Brittany Franklin	6 ft 5 in (1.96 m)	Jr	Plymouth	Plymouth, NC
C	35	Bailey Helgren	6 ft 5 in (1.96 m)	Jr	Edina	Edina, MN
C	45	Chisom Ajekwu	6 ft 3 in (1.91 m)	Fr	Lawrence	Lawrence, KS

Head coach

- Brandon Schneider (Wayland Baptist)

Assistant coach(es)

- Damitria Buchanan (Texas A&M)
- Jhasmin Player (Baylor)
- Terry Nooner (Kansas)

Legend

- (C) Team captain
- (S) Suspended
- (I) Ineligible
- (W) Walk-on
- Injured
- Current redshirt

Roster
Last update: June 2, 2020

== Schedule and results ==
Date time, TV	Rank^{#}	Opponent^{#}	Result	Record	Site (attendance) city, state
Exhibition
October 27, 2019*; 2:00 p.m., ESPN+		Pittsburg State	L 82–90	–	Allen Fieldhouse (1,246); Lawrence, KS
November 3, 2019*; 2:00 p.m., ESPN+		Emporia State	W 66–55	–	Allen Fieldhouse (1,307); Lawrence, KS
Non-conference regular season
November 7, 2019*; 7:00 p.m., ESPN+		Indiana State	W 84–72	1–0	Allen Fieldhouse (1,252); Lawrence, KS
November 10, 2019*; 1:00 p.m., ESPN+		UIC	W 91–50	2–0	Allen Fieldhouse (1,200); Lawrence, KS
November 13, 2019*; 7:00 p.m., ESPN+		Omaha	W 63–48	3–0	Allen Fieldhouse (1,353); Lawrence, KS
November 17, 2019*; 1:00 p.m., ESPN+		UMass Lowell	W 79–44	4–0	Allen Fieldhouse (1,420); Lawrence, KS
November 24, 2019*; 2:00 p.m., ESPN+		Texas State	W 68–48	5–0	Allen Fieldhouse (1,433); Lawrence, KS
November 29, 2019*; 11:00 a.m., CUSA TV		vs. Wright State; FAU Thanksgiving Tournament	W 74–63	6–0	FAU Arena; Boca Raton, FL
November 20, 2019*; 12:00 p.m., CUSA TV		at FAU; FAU Thanksgiving Tournament	W 90–60	7–0	FAU Arena (385); Boca Raton, FL
December 8, 2019*; 2:00 p.m., ESPN+		Florida; Big 12/SEC Women's Challenge	W 76–66	8–0	Allen Fieldhouse (1,625); Lawrence, KS
December 15, 2019*; 2:00 p.m., ESPN+		St. Mary's	W 86–81	9–0	Allen Fieldhouse (1,291); Lawrence, KS
December 22, 2019* w:00 p.m., ESPN+		at Saint Louis	W 68–60 ^{OT}	10–0	Chaifetz Arena (2,210); St. Louis, MO
December 30, 2019*; 7:00 p.m., ESPN+		Wofford	W 83–64	11–0	Allen Fieldhouse (1,935); Lawrence, KS
Big 12 regular season
January 4, 2020; 2:00 p.m., ESPN+		at Oklahoma State	L 49–67	11–1 (0–1)	Gallagher-Iba Arena (2,226); Stillwater, OK
January 8, 2020; 7:00 p.m., ESPN+		No. 19 West Virginia	L 49–68	11–2 (0–2)	Allen Fieldhouse (1,313); Lawrence, KS
January 12, 2020; 2:00 p.m., FSSW		at TCU	L 59–73	11–3 (0–3)	Schollmaier Arena (2,590); Fort Worth, TX
January 15, 2020; 7:00 p.m., ESPN+		No. 2 Baylor	L 47–90	11–4 (0–4)	Allen Fieldhouse (1,500); Lawrence, KS
January 18, 2020; 5:00 p.m., ESPN+		Texas Tech	W 67–50	12–4 (1–4)	Allen Fieldhouse (1,569); Lawrence, KS
January 22, 2020; 7:00 p.m., LHN		at Texas	L 77–85	12–5 (1–5)	Frank Erwin Center (2,756); Austin, TX
January 25, 2020; 2:00 p.m.		at Iowa State	L 67–89	12–6 (1–6)	Hilton Coliseum (9,833); Ames, IA
January 29, 2020; 8:00 p.m., FSN		Kansas State; Sunflower Showdown	L 61–69	12–7 (1–7)	Allen Fieldhouse (1,743); Lawrence, KS
February 2, 2020; 12:00 p.m., FSN		Oklahoma	L 82–94 ^{OT}	12–8 (1–8)	Allen Fieldhouse (1,715); Lawrence, KS
February 5, 2020; 7:00 p.m., ESPN+		at No. 2 Baylor	L 44–97	12–9 (1–9)	Ferrell Center (8,265); Waco, TX
February 8, 2020; 5:00 p.m., ESPN+		TCU	L 74–87	12–10 (1–10)	Allen Fieldhouse (1,773); Lawrence, KS
February 12, 2020; 7:00 p.m.		at Texas Tech	L 72–89	12–11 (1–11)	United Supermarkets Arena (3,407); Lubbock, TX
February 15, 2020; 6:00 p.m., ESPN+		Texas	W 82–67	13–11 (2–11)	Allen Fieldhouse (2,072); Lawrence, KS
February 22, 2020; 4:00 p.m.		at West Virginia	L 53–60	13–12 (2–12)	WVU Coliseum (3,135); Morgantown, WV
February 26, 2020; 7:00 p.m.		at Oklahoma	W 83–80	14–12 (3–12)	Lloyd Noble Center (1,794); Norman, OK
February 29, 2020; 5:00 p.m., ESPN+		Oklahoma State	W 77–69	15–12 (4–12)	Allen Fieldhouse (2,471); Lawrence, KS
March 3, 2020; 7:00 p.m., ESPN+		Iowa State	L 42–61	15–13 (4–13)	Allen Fieldhouse (1,689); Lawrence, KS
March 8, 2020; 2:00 p.m., ESPN+		at Kansas State; Sunflower Showdown	L 63–83	15–14 (4–14)	Bramlage Coliseum (5,172); Manhattan, KS
Big 12 Tournament
March 12, 2020; 8:30 p.m., FSN	(10)	vs. (7) Texas Tech; First Round	Canceled		Municipal Auditorium; Kansas City, Missouri
*Non-conference game. ^{#}Rankings from AP Poll / Coaches' Poll. (#) Tournament seedings in parentheses. All times are in Central Time.

== Rankings ==
2019–20 NCAA Division I women's basketball rankings

+ Regular season polls	Poll	Pre- Season	Week 2	Week 3	Week 4	Week 5	Week 6	Week 7	Week 8	Week 9	Week 10	Week 11	Week 12	Week 13	Week 14	Week 15	Week 16	Week 17	Week 18	Week 19	Final
AP							RV	RV	RV	RV										N/A	
Coaches																					

Legend
	Increase in ranking
	Decrease in ranking
	No change
(RV)	Received votes
(NR)	Not ranked

== See also ==
- 2019–20 Kansas Jayhawks men's basketball team
