= 2019–20 NCAA Division I women's basketball rankings =

- Season: 2019–20
- NCAA Tournament: 2020
- Preseason No. 1: Oregon
- NCAA Tournament Champions: None (season ended March 12, 2020).
NCAA Division I women's basketball rankings


Two human polls make up the 2019–20 NCAA Division I women's basketball rankings, the AP Poll and the Coaches Poll, in addition to various publications' preseason polls. Due to the COVID-19 pandemic, the season ended March 12, 2020. As a result, the NCAA did not bestow a national championship. Instead, that title was de facto bestowed by one or more different polling agencies. There are two main weekly polls that begin in the preseason—the AP Poll and the Coaches' Poll.

As such, South Carolina finished the season first in both wire rankings, on December 31, 2020, raised a banner to make a claim to such a mythical national championship. This banner is located between their 2017 and 2022 NCAA championship banners, and is of the same size as those, at their home venue, Colonial Life Arena.

== Legend ==
	Increase in ranking
	Decrease in ranking
	Not ranked previous week
Italics	Number of first place votes
(#–#)	Win–loss record
т	Tied with team above or below also with this symbol

== AP Poll ==
	Preseason Oct. 30	Week 2 Nov. 11	Week 3 Nov. 18	Week 4 Nov. 25	Week 5 Dec. 2	Week 6 Dec. 9	Week 7 Dec. 16	Week 8 Dec. 23	Week 9 Dec. 30	Week 10 Jan. 6	Week 11 Jan. 13	Week 12 Jan. 20	Week 13 Jan. 27	Week 14 Feb. 3	Week 15 Feb. 10	Week 16 Feb. 17	Week 17 Feb. 24	Week 18 Mar. 2	Week 19 Mar. 9	Week 20 Mar. 17	
1.	Oregon (25)	Oregon (28) (0–0)	Oregon (27) (3–0)	Oregon (28) (4–0)	Stanford (23) (8–0)	Stanford (27) (8–0)	Stanford (27) (9–0)	UConn (19) (10–0)	UConn (19) (10–0)	UConn (19) (12–0)	South Carolina (20) (16–1)	South Carolina (22) (17–1)	South Carolina (26) (19–1)	South Carolina (26) (21–1)	South Carolina (27) (22–1)	South Carolina (27) (24–1)	South Carolina (27) (27–1)	South Carolina (27) (29–1)	South Carolina (27) (32–1)	South Carolina (26) (32–1)	1.
2.	Baylor (3)	Baylor (2) (2–0)	Baylor (2) (3–0)	Baylor (2) (5–0)	Louisville (5) (8–0)	UConn (1) (8–0)	UConn (1) (8–0)	Oregon (5) (10–1)	Oregon (5) (10–1)	Oregon (7) (12–1)	Baylor (7) (13–1)	Baylor (6) (15–1)	Baylor (3) (17–1)	Baylor (3) (19–1)	Baylor (3) (21–1)	Baylor (2) (23–1)	Baylor (2) (25–1)	Baylor (2) (27–1)	Oregon (3) (31–2)	Oregon (4) (31–2)	2.
3.	Stanford	Stanford (2–0)	Stanford (4–0)	Stanford (5–0)	Oregon (6–1)	Oregon (1) (7–1)	Oregon (1) (8–1)	Oregon State (4) (11–0)	Oregon State (5) (12–0)	Oregon State (3) (14–0)	Stanford (1) (15–1)	UConn (16–1)	Oregon (17–2)	Oregon (19–2)	Oregon (22–2)	Oregon (1) (24–2)	Oregon (1) (25–2)	Oregon (1) (28–2)	Baylor (28–2)	Baylor (28–2)	3.
4.	Maryland	UConn (1–0)	UConn (3–0)	UConn (5–0)	UConn (2) (6–0)	Oregon State (1) (8–0)	Oregon State (1) (9–0)	South Carolina (1) (12–1)	South Carolina (1) (12–1)	South Carolina (1) (14–1)	UConn (13–1)	Oregon (15–2)	UConn (18–1)	UConn (19–1)	NC State (22–1)	Stanford (23–3)	Stanford (24–3)	Louisville (27–3)	Maryland (28–4)	Maryland (28–4)	4.
5.	UConn	Texas A&M (2–0)	South Carolina (4–0)	South Carolina (6–0)	Oregon State (7–0)	South Carolina (9–1)	South Carolina (10–1)	Stanford (10–1)	Stanford (11–1)	Stanford (13–1)	Louisville (2) (16–1)	Louisville (2)	Louisville (1) (20–1)	Louisville (1) (21–1)	UConn (20–2)	Louisville (23–3)	Louisville (25–3)	UConn (25–3)	UConn (28–3)	UConn (29–3)	5.
6.	Texas A&M	South Carolina (2–0)	Texas A&M (3–0)	Texas A&M (4–0)	South Carolina (8–1)	Baylor (8–1)	Louisville (10–1)	Baylor (9–1)	Baylor (9–1)	Baylor (11–1)	Oregon (13–2)	Stanford (16–2)	Stanford (18–2)	Stanford (20–2)	Mississippi State (22–3)	UConn (21–3)	UConn (23–3)	Maryland (25–4)	Louisville (28–4)	Louisville (28–4)	6.
7.	Oregon State	Oregon State (1–0)	Oregon State (4–0)	Oregon State (5–0)	Baylor (7–1)	Louisville (9–1)	Baylor (8–1)	Louisville (11–1)	Louisville (12–1)	Louisville (14–1)	UCLA (16–0)	Oregon State (16–2)	NC State (19–1)	NC State (21–1)	UCLA (21–2)	Maryland (22–4)	Maryland (23–4)	Stanford (25–5)	Stanford (27–6)	Stanford (27–6)	7.
8.	South Carolina	Maryland (1–1)	Louisville (3–0)	Louisville (5–0)	Florida State (7–0)	Florida State (9–0)	Florida State (10–0)	Florida State (12–0)	Florida State (13–0)	UCLA (14–0)	Oregon State (15–1)	NC State (17–1)	UCLA (18–1)	Mississippi State (19–3)	Stanford (21–3)	UCLA (21–3)	NC State (23–3)	UCLA (25–4)	NC State (28–4)	NC State (28–4)	8.
9.	Louisville	Louisville (2–0)	Maryland (3–1)	Maryland (5–1)	Maryland (7–1)	NC State (9–0)	NC State (10–0)	NC State (11–0)	NC State (12–0)	NC State (14–0)	NC State (15–1)	Mississippi State (16–2)	Mississippi State (18–3)	Oregon State (18–4)	Louisville (21–3)	Mississippi State (22–4)	UCLA (23–4)	Mississippi State (25–5)	Mississippi State (27–6)	Mississippi State (27–6)	9.
10.	Mississippi State	Mississippi State (1–0)	Mississippi State (3–0)	Mississippi State (5–0)	Mississippi State (8–1)	UCLA (8–0)	UCLA (9–0)	UCLA (11–0)	UCLA (12–0)	Texas A&M (13–1)	Mississippi State (15–2)	UCLA (16–1)	Oregon State (16–4)	UCLA (19–2)	Maryland (20–4)	NC State (22–3)	Mississippi State (23–5)	NC State (25–4)	UCLA (26–5)	UCLA (26–5)	10.
11.	UCLA	UCLA (2–0)	UCLA (3–0)	UCLA (4–0)	UCLA (7–0)	Texas A&M (7–1)	Texas A&M (9–1)	Texas A&M (11–1)	Texas A&M (12–1)	Florida State (14–1)	Kentucky (14–2)	DePaul (17–2)	DePaul (19–2)	Gonzaga (22–1)	Oregon State (19–5)	Arizona (21–4)	Gonzaga (27–2)	Northwestern (26–3)	Gonzaga (28–2)	Northwestern (26–4)	11.
12.	Florida State	Florida State (2–0)	Florida State (4–0)	Florida State (5–0)т	Texas A&M (5–1)	Indiana (8–1)	Indiana (10–1)	Maryland (9–2)	Maryland (10–2)	Indiana (12–2)	Texas A&M (14–2)	Kentucky (15–3)	Gonzaga (20–1)	Arizona (18–3)	Arizona (19–4)	DePaul (24–3)	Texas A&M (22–5)	Gonzaga (28–2)	Northwestern (26–4)	Arizona (24–7)	12.
13.	Kentucky	Kentucky (2–0)	Kentucky (4–0)	NC State (5–0)т	NC State (8–0)	Maryland (8–2)	Maryland (8–2)	Kentucky (11–1)	Kentucky (11–1)	Mississippi State (14–2)	Florida State (15–2)	Gonzaga (18–1)	Kentucky (15–3)	Maryland (17–4)	DePaul (22–3)	Gonzaga (25–2)	Arizona (22–5)	Arizona (23–6)	Arizona (24–7)	Gonzaga (28–3)	13.
14.	NC State	NC State (2–0)	NC State (3–0)	Kentucky (5–0)	Indiana (6–1)	Kentucky (9–0)	Kentucky (10–1)	Indiana (10–2)	Indiana (11–2)	Kentucky (12–2)	DePaul (15–2)	Florida State (15–3)	Florida State (17–3)	DePaul (20–3)	Florida State (20–4)	Kentucky (19–5)	Northwestern (24–3)	Oregon State (22–8)	Oregon State (23–9)	Oregon State (23–9)	14.
15.	Texas	Notre Dame (2–0)	Michigan State (3–0)	Michigan State (5–0)	Kentucky (7–0)	Mississippi State (8–2)	Mississippi State (8–2)	Mississippi State (11–2)	Mississippi State (12–2)	DePaul (13–2)	Indiana (14–3)	Texas A&M (15–3)	Texas A&M (17–3)	Kentucky (17–4)	Gonzaga (23–2)	Oregon State (19–6)	Kentucky (20–6)	Texas A&M (22–7)	DePaul (27–5)	DePaul (28–5)	15.
16.	Notre Dame	Michigan State (2–0)	Miami (FL) (3–0)	DePaul (4–1)	DePaul (6–1)	DePaul (7–1)	DePaul (9–1)	DePaul (10–2)	DePaul (11–2)	Gonzaga (14–1)	Gonzaga (16–1)	Arizona State (15–4)	Arizona (16–3)	Texas A&M (18–4)	Texas A&M (18–5)	Texas A&M (20–5)	DePaul (25–4)	Kentucky (21–7)	Kentucky (22–8)	Kentucky (22–8)	16.
17.	Michigan State	Miami (FL) (1–0)	Syracuse (3–0)	Indiana (4–0)	Tennessee (7–0)	Gonzaga (8–1)	Gonzaga (9–1)	Gonzaga (11–1)	Gonzaga (12–1)	Maryland (10–3)	West Virginia (13–1)	Indiana (14–4)	Maryland (16–4)	Florida State (18–4)	Iowa (20–4)	Florida State (20–5)	Oregon State (20–8)	South Dakota (27–2)	South Dakota (28–2)	South Dakota (30–2)	17.
18.	DePaulT	DePaul (1–0)	Indiana (3–0)	Syracuse (3–1)	Gonzaga (6–1)	Arizona (9–0)	Arizona (10–0)	Arizona (11–0)	Arizona (12–0)	Arizona (13–1)	Arizona State (13–4)	Arizona (15–3)	Iowa (17–3)	Indiana (17–5)	Kentucky (18–5)	Northwestern (22–3)	Iowa (22–5)	DePaul (25–5)	Florida State (24–8)	Texas A&M (22–8)	18.
19.	Miami (FL)T	Arizona State (2–0)	DePaul (2–1)	Miami (FL) (4–1)	Michigan State (6–1)	Michigan State (6–2)	Michigan State (7–2)	West Virginia (9–1)	West Virginia (9–1)	West Virginia (11–1)	Missouri State (14–2)	Iowa (15–3)	Arizona State (15–5)	Arizona State (16–6)	Northwestern (19–3)	Iowa (21–5)	Florida State (21–6)	Iowa (23–6)	Texas A&M (22–8)	Florida State (24–8)	19.
20.	Arizona State	Syracuse (1–0)	Arkansas (4–0)	Tennessee (5–0)	Arizona (7–0)	Missouri State (8–1)	Missouri State (9–1)	Arkansas (11–1)	Arkansas (12–1)	Missouri State (12–2)	Maryland (12–4)	Maryland (13–4)	Indiana (15–5)	Iowa (18–4)	Indiana (19–6)	South Dakota (24–2)	South Dakota (26–2)	Indiana (23–7)	Indiana (24–8)	Indiana (24–8)	20.
21.	Syracuse	Indiana (2–0)	Michigan (4–0)	South Florida (5–1)	Miami (FL) (5–2)	Arkansas (8–1)	Arkansas (10–1)	Missouri State (9–2)	Missouri State (9–2)	Arkansas (13–2)	Arizona (13–3)	Arkansas (15–3)	South Dakota (19–2)	Northwestern (19–3)	South Dakota (22–2)	Arizona State (18–8)	Missouri State (23–3)	Princeton (24–1)	Iowa (23–7)	Iowa (23–7)	21.
22.	Arkansas	Texas (0–1)	South Florida (4–0)	Gonzaga (3–1)	Missouri State (7–1)	West Virginia (6–1)	West Virginia (7–1)	Tennessee (9–2)	Tennessee (10–2)	South Dakota (14–2)	Iowa (13–3)	Northwestern (16–2)	Tennessee (16–4)	South Dakota (21–2)	Arizona State (16–8)	Arkansas (20–5)	Indiana (21–7)	Florida State (22–7)	Princeton (26–1)	Princeton (26–1)	22.
23.	Minnesota	Arkansas (1–0)	Gonzaga (2–1)T	West Virginia (4–0)	Arkansas (7–1)	Tennessee (7–1)	Tennessee (8–1)	Michigan (9–2)	Miami (FL) (9–3)	Tennessee (11–3)	Arkansas (14–3)	Tennessee (14–3)	Northwestern (17–3)	Tennessee (17–5)	Arkansas (19–5)	Missouri State (21–3)	Princeton (21–1)	Missouri State (24–4)	Missouri State (26–4)	Missouri State (26–4)	23.
24.	Indiana	Michigan (2–0)	Tennessee (4–0)T	Arizona (6–0)	Michigan (6–1)	Michigan (8–1)	Michigan (9–1)	Miami (FL) (8–3)	Minnesota (11–1)	Michigan (11–3)	Tennessee (13–3)	South Dakota (17–2)	Missouri State (16–3)	Missouri State (18–3)	Missouri State (20–3)	Indiana (20–7)	Arizona State (19–9)	Arizona State (20–10)	Arkansas (24–8)	Arkansas (24–8)	24.
25.	Michigan	South Florida (2–0)	West Virginia (3–0)	Arkansas (5–1)	LSU (7–1)	Miami (FL) (5–3)	South Dakota (12–1)	Texas (7–4)	Texas (8–4)	Princeton (12–1)	South Dakota (15–2)	West Virginia (13–3)	Arkansas (16–4)	Arkansas (18–4)	Tennessee (17–6)	Princeton (19–1)	TCU (20–5)	Arkansas (22–7)	Arizona State (20–11)	Arizona State (20–11)	25.
	Preseason Oct. 30	Week 2 Nov. 11	Week 3 Nov. 18	Week 4 Nov. 25	Week 5 Dec. 2	Week 6 Dec. 9	Week 7 Dec. 16	Week 8 Dec. 23	Week 9 Dec. 30	Week 10 Jan. 6	Week 11 Jan. 13	Week 12 Jan. 20	Week 13 Jan. 27	Week 14 Feb. 3	Week 15 Feb. 10	Week 16 Feb. 17	Week 17 Feb. 24	Week 18 Mar. 2	Week 19 Mar. 9	Week 20 Mar. 17	
		Dropped: No. 23 Minnesota	Dropped: No. 15 Notre Dame; No. 19 Arizona State; No. 22 Texas	Dropped: No. 21 Michigan	Dropped: No. 18 Syracuse; No. 21 South Florida; No. 23 West Virginia	Dropped: No. 25 LSU	Dropped: No. 25 Miami (FL)	Dropped: No. 19 Michigan State; No. 25 South Dakota	Dropped: No. 23 Michigan	Dropped: No. 23 Miami (FL); No. 24 Minnesota; No. 25 Texas	Dropped: No. 24 Michigan; No. 25 Princeton	Dropped: No. 19 Missouri State	Dropped: No. 25 West Virginia	None	None	Dropped: No. 25 Tennessee	Dropped: No. 22 Arkansas	Dropped: No. 25 TCU	None	None	

== USA Today Coaches Poll ==
The Coaches Poll is the second oldest poll still in use after the AP Poll. It is compiled by a rotating group of 31 college Division I head coaches. The Poll operates by Borda count. Each voting member ranks teams from 1 to 25. Each team then receives points for their ranking in reverse order: Number 1 earns 25 points, number 2 earns 24 points, and so forth. The points are then combined and the team with the highest points is then ranked No. 1; second highest is ranked No. 2 and so forth. Only the top 25 teams with points are ranked, with teams receiving first place votes noted the quantity next to their name. The maximum points a single team can earn is 775.

	Preseason Oct 30	Week 2 Nov 19	Week 3 Nov 26	Week 4 Dec 3	Week 5 Dec 10	Week 6 Dec 17	Week 7 Dec 24	Week 8 Dec 31	Week 9 Jan 7	Week 10 Jan 14	Week 11 Jan 21	Week 12 Jan 28	Week 13 Feb 4	Week 14 Feb 11	Week 15 Feb 18	Week 16 Feb 25	Week 17 Mar 3	Week 18 Mar 10	Final Mar 16	
1.	Oregon (24)	Oregon (30) (3–0)	Oregon (29) (4–0)	Stanford (24) (8–0)	Stanford (28) (8–0)	Stanford (27) (9–0)	UConn (21) (10–0)	UConn (22) (10–0)	UConn (24) (12–0)	Baylor (16) (13–1)	Baylor (20) (15–1)	Baylor (18) (17–1)	Baylor (18) (19–1)	South Carolina (17) (23–1)	South Carolina (20) (25–1)	South Carolina (20) (27–1)	South Carolina (23) (29–1)	South Carolina (27) (32–1)	South Carolina (26) (32–1)	1.
2.	Baylor (8)	Baylor (2) (3–0)	Baylor (3) (5–0)	Louisville (5) (8–0)	UConn (3) (8–0)	UConn (3) (9–0)	Oregon (4) (10–1)	Oregon (6) (10–1)	Oregon (5) (12–1)	South Carolina (12) (16–1)	South Carolina (12) (18–1)	South Carolina (12) (19–1)	South Carolina (13) (21–1)	Baylor (12) (21–1)	Baylor (8) (23–1)	Baylor (8) (26–1)	Baylor (6) (27–1)	Oregon (5) (31–2)	Oregon (6) (31–2)	2.
3.	Stanford	Stanford (4–0)	Stanford (5–0)	Oregon (1) (6–1)	Oregon (7–1)	Oregon (9–1)	Oregon State (4) (11–0)	Oregon State (12–0)	Oregon State (3) (14–0)	Stanford (2) (15–1)	Louisville (18–1)	Oregon (17–2)	Oregon (1) (20–2)	Oregon (3) (22–2)	Oregon (3) (24–2)	Oregon (3) (26–2)	Oregon (3) (28–2)	Baylor (28–2)	Baylor (28–2)	3.
4.	UConn	UConn (3–0)	UConn (5–0)	UConn (2) (6–0)	Oregon State (8–0)	Oregon State (1) (9–0)	Stanford (2) (10–1)	Stanford (11–1)	Stanford (13–1)	Louisville (1) (16–1)	Oregon (15–2)	Louisville (1) (20–1)	Louisville (21–1)	NC State (22–1)	Stanford (23–3)	UConn (23–3)	UConn (26–3)	UConn (29–3)	UConn (29–3)	4.
5.	Maryland	Oregon State (4–0)	Oregon State (5–0)	Oregon State (7–0)	Baylor (8–1)	Baylor (8–1)	South Carolina (12–1)	South Carolina (12–1)	South Carolina (14–1)	UConn (13–1)	UConn (16–1)	UConn (18–1)	Stanford (20–2)	Mississippi State (22–3)	UConn (21–3)	Louisville (25–3)	Louisville (27–3)	Maryland (28–4)	Maryland (28–4)	5.
6.	Oregon State	South Carolina (4–0)	South Carolina (6–0)	Baylor (7–1)	South Carolina (9–1)	South Carolina (10–1)	Baylor (9–1)	Baylor (10–1)	Baylor (11–1)	Oregon (13–2)	Stanford (16–2)	Stanford (18–2)	UConn (19–2)	UConn (20–3)	Louisville (23–3)	Stanford (24–4)	Maryland (25–4)	Louisville (28–4)	Stanford (27–6)	6.
7.	Texas A&M	Texas A&M (3–0)	Texas A&M (4–0)	South Carolina (8–1)	Louisville (9–1)	Louisville (10–1)	Louisville (11–1)	Louisville (12–1)	Louisville (14–1)	Oregon State (15–1)	Oregon State (16–2)	NC State (19–1)	NC State (21–1)	Stanford (21–3)	UCLA (22–3)	Maryland (23–4)	UCLA (25–4)	Stanford (27–6)	Louisville (28–4)	7.
8.	Mississippi State	Mississippi State (4–0)	Mississippi State (6–0)	Mississippi State (8–1)	Florida State (9–0)	Florida State (10–0)	Florida State (12–0)	Florida State (13–0)	NC State (14–0)	UCLA (16–0)	NC State (17–1)	Mississippi State (18–3)	Mississippi State (20–3)	UCLA (21–2)	Maryland (22–4)	UCLA (23–4)	Stanford (25–5)	NC State (28–4)	NC State (28–4)	8.
9.	Louisville	Louisville (3–0)	Louisville (5–0)	Maryland (7–1)	NC State (9–0)	NC State (10–0)	NC State (11–0)	NC State (12–0)	UCLA (14–0)	Mississippi State (15–2)	Mississippi State (16–3)	UCLA (18–1)	Oregon State (18–4)	Louisville (21–3)	Mississippi State (22–4)	Mississippi State (23–5)	Mississippi State (25–5)	UCLA (26–5)	UCLA (26–5)	9.
10.	South Carolina	Maryland (3–1)	Maryland (5–1)	Florida State (7–0)	UCLA (8–0)	UCLA (9–0)	UCLA (11–0)	UCLA (12–0)	Texas A&M (14–1)	NC State (15–1)	UCLA (16–1)	Oregon State (16–4)	UCLA (19–2)	Maryland (20–4)	NC State (22–3)	Gonzaga (27–2)	NC State (25–4)	Mississippi State (27–6)	Mississippi State (27–6)	10.
11.	UCLA	UCLA (3–0)	UCLA (4–0)	UCLA (7–0)	Kentucky (9–0)	Maryland (8–2)	Maryland (9–2)	Maryland (10–2)	Florida State (14–1)	Kentucky (14–2)	Gonzaga (18–1)	Gonzaga (20–1)	Gonzaga (22–1)	Oregon State (19–5)	Arizona (21–4)	NC State (23–4)	Gonzaga (28–2)	South Dakota (29–2)	South Dakota (30–2)	11.
12.	NC State	NC State (3–0)	NC State (5–0)	NC State (8–0)	Maryland (8–2)	Texas A&M (9–1)	Texas A&M (11–1)	Texas A&M (12–1)	Mississippi State (14–2)	Texas A&M (14–2)	DePaul (17–2)	DePaul (19–2)	Maryland (18–4)	Arizona (19–4)	DePaul (24–3)	South Dakota (26–2)	South Dakota (27–2)	Arizona (24–7)	Arizona (24–7)	12.
13.	Florida State	Florida State (4–0)	Florida State (5–0)	Texas A&M (5–1)	Texas A&M (7–1)	Kentucky (10–1)	Kentucky (11–1)	Kentucky (11–1)	Indiana (13–2)	Gonzaga (16–1)	Kentucky (15–3)	Kentucky (16–3)	Arizona (18–3)	DePaul (22–3)	Gonzaga (25–2)	Arizona (22–5)	Northwestern (26–3)	Gonzaga (28–3)	Gonzaga (28–3)	13.
14.	Notre Dame	Kentucky (4–0)	Kentucky (5–0)	Kentucky (7–0)	Mississippi State (8–2)	Indiana (10–1)	Mississippi State (11–2)	Mississippi State (12–2)	Kentucky (12–2)	Florida State (15–2)	Florida State (15–3)	Florida State (17–3)	DePaul (20–3)	Florida State (20–4)	Oregon State (19–7)	Texas A&M (22–5)	Arizona (23–6)	DePaul (28–5)	DePaul (28–5)	14.
15.	Texas	Syracuse (3–0)	Michigan State (5–0)	DePaul (6–1)	Indiana (8–1)	Mississippi State (9–2)	Indiana (10–2)	Indiana (11–2)	Gonzaga (14–1)	DePaul (15–2)	Texas A&M (15–3)	Texas A&M (17–3)	Kentucky (17–4)	Gonzaga (23–2)	South Dakota (24–2)	DePaul (25–4)	Oregon State (22–8)	Northwestern (26–4)	Northwestern (26–4)	15.
16.	Kentucky	Michigan State (3–0)	Syracuse (3–1)	Indiana (6–1)	DePaul (7–1)	DePaul (9–2)	DePaul (10–2)	Gonzaga (12–1)	Maryland (11–3)	Indiana (14–3)	Arizona State (15–4)	Maryland (16–4)	Texas A&M (18–4)	South Dakota (22–2)	Kentucky (19–5)	Kentucky (20–6)	DePaul (25–5)	Oregon State (23–9)	Oregon State (23–9)	16.
17.	Syracuse	Miami (FL) (3–0)	DePaul (4–1)	Gonzaga (6–1)	Gonzaga (8–1)	Missouri State (9–1)	Gonzaga (11–1)	DePaul (11–2)	DePaul (13–2)	Missouri State (14–2)	Maryland (14–4)	Arizona (16–3)	South Dakota (21–2)	Missouri State (20–3)	Texas A&M (20–5)	Missouri State (23–3)	Princeton (24–1)	Princeton (26–1)	Princeton (26–1)	17.
18.	Arizona State	Arkansas (4–0)	Miami (FL) (4–1)	Missouri State (7–1)	Missouri State (8–1)	Gonzaga (9–1)	Arizona (11–0)	Arizona (12–0)	Missouri State (12–2)	West Virginia (13–1)	South Dakota (17–2)	South Dakota (19–2)	Florida State (18–4)	Texas A&M (18–5)	Missouri State (21–3)	Oregon State (20–8)	Kentucky (21–7)	Kentucky (22–8)	Kentucky (22–8)	18.
19.	Miami (FL)	Michigan (4–0)	Missouri State (6–1)	Tennessee (7–0) т	Arizona (9–0)	Arizona (10–0)	Missouri State (9–2)	Missouri State (9–2)	Arizona (13–1)	Arizona State (13–4)	Arizona (15–3)	Iowa (17–3)	Missouri State (18–3)	Kentucky (18–5)	Florida State (20–5)	Northwestern (24–3)	Texas A&M (22–7)	Missouri State (26–4)	Missouri State (26–4)	19.
20.	DePaul	DePaul (2–1)	South Florida (5–1)	Arizona (8–0) т	Arkansas (8–1)	Arkansas (10–1)	Arkansas (11–1)	Arkansas (12–1)	West Virginia (11–1)	Maryland (12–4)	Arkansas (15–3)	Arizona State (15–5)	Iowa (18–4)	Iowa (20–4)	Northwestern (22–3)	Iowa (22–5)	Iowa (23–6)	Florida State (24–8)	Florida State (24–8)	20.
21.	Michigan State	Gonzaga (2–1)	Gonzaga (3–1)	Michigan State (6–1)	South Dakota (9–1)	South Dakota (11–1)	West Virginia (9–1)	West Virginia (9–1)	Arkansas (13–2)	South Dakota (15–2)	Iowa (15–3)	Missouri State (16–3)	Arizona State (16–6)	Northwestern (20–3)	Iowa (21–5)	Princeton (21–1)	Missouri State (24–4)	Texas A&M (22–8)	Texas A&M (22–8)	21.
22.	Arkansas	Missouri State (4–1)	Arizona (6–0)	Miami (FL) (5–2)	Michigan (8–1)	Michigan (9–1)	South Dakota (11–2)	South Dakota (12–2)	South Dakota (14–2)	Arizona (13–3)	Missouri State (14–3)	Tennessee (16–4)	Indiana (18–5)	Florida Gulf Coast (24–2)	Florida Gulf Coast (26–2)	Florida State (21–6)	Indiana (23–7)	Indiana (24–8)	Indiana (24–8)	22.
23.	Gonzaga	South Florida (4–0)	Indiana (4–0)	Arkansas (7–1)	Michigan State (6–2)	Michigan State (7–2)	Michigan (9–2)	Tennessee (10–2)	Princeton (12–1)	Arkansas (14–3)	Tennessee (15–3)	Indiana (16–5)	Northwestern (19–3)	Indiana (19–6)	Princeton (19–1)	Florida Gulf Coast (27–2)	Florida State (22–7)	Iowa (23–7)	Iowa (23–7)	23.
24.	MichiganT	Arizona (4–0)	Arkansas (5–1)	South Dakota (7–1)	Tennessee (7–1)	Tennessee (8–1)	Tennessee (9–2)	Princeton (12–1)	Tennessee (11–3)	Iowa (13–3)	Indiana (14–5)	Florida Gulf Coast (20–2)	Florida Gulf Coast (22–2)	Arizona State (16–8)	Arizona State (18–8)	Indiana (21–7)	Florida Gulf Coast (28–3)	Florida Gulf Coast (29–3)	Florida Gulf Coast (30–3)	24.
25.	Iowa StateT	Indiana (3–0)	Tennessee (5–0)	Michigan (6–1)	West Virginia (6–1)	West Virginia (7–1)	Princeton (11–1)	Florida Gulf Coast (13–2)	Florida Gulf Coast (15–2)	Tennessee (13–3)	Northwestern (16–2)	Arkansas (16–4)	Tennessee (17–5)	Princeton (17–1)	Arkansas (20–5)	TCU (20–5)	Arizona State (20–10)	Arkansas (24–8)	Arkansas (24–8)	25.
	Preseason Oct 30	Week 2 Nov 19	Week 3 Nov 26	Week 4 Dec 3	Week 5 Dec 10	Week 6 Dec 17	Week 7 Dec 24	Week 8 Dec 31	Week 9 Jan 7	Week 10 Jan 14	Week 11 Jan 21	Week 12 Jan 28	Week 13 Feb 4	Week 14 Feb 11	Week 15 Feb 18	Week 16 Feb 25	Week 17 Mar 3	Week 18 Mar 10	Final Mar 16	
		Dropped: No. 14 Notre Dame; No. 15 Texas; No. 18 Arizona State; No. 24 Iowa State	Dropped: No. 19 Michigan	Dropped: No. 16 Syracuse; No. 20 South Florida	Dropped: No. 22 Miami (FL)	None	Dropped: No. 23 Michigan State	Dropped: No. 23 Michigan	None	Dropped: No. 23 Princeton; No. 25 Florida Gulf Coast	Dropped: No. 18 West Virginia	Dropped: No. 25 Northwestern	Dropped: No. 25 Arkansas	Dropped: No. 25 Tennessee	Dropped: No. 23 Indiana	Dropped: No. 24 Arizona State; No. 25 Arkansas	Dropped: No. 25 TCU	Dropped: No. 25 Arizona State	None	

== See also ==
2019–20 NCAA Division I men's basketball rankings
