= 2019–20 Colorado Buffaloes women's basketball team =

American college basketball season

2019–20 Colorado Buffaloes women's basketball
- Conference: Pac-12 Conference
- Record: 16–14 (5–13 Pac-12)
- Head coach: JR Payne (4th season)
- Assistant coaches: Toriano Towns; Alex Earl; Shandrika Lee
- Home arena: CU Events Center

2019–20 Pac-12 Conference women's basketball standings
	Conf.				Overall
Team	W		L	PCT	W		L	PCT
No. 2 Oregon†	17	–	1	.944	31	–	2	.939
No. 10 UCLA	14	–	4	.778	26	–	5	.839
No. 7 Stanford	14	–	4	.778	27	–	6	.818
No. 13 Arizona	12	–	6	.667	24	–	7	.774
No. 14 Oregon State	10	–	8	.556	23	–	9	.719
No. 25 Arizona State	10	–	8	.556	20	–	11	.645
USC	8	–	10	.444	17	–	14	.548
Utah	6	–	12	.333	14	–	17	.452
Colorado	5	–	13	.278	16	–	14	.533
Washington	5	–	13	.278	13	–	17	.433
Washington State	4	–	14	.222	11	–	20	.355
California	3	–	15	.167	12	–	19	.387
† 2020 Pac-12 Tournament winner Rankings from AP poll

The 2019–20 Colorado Buffaloes women's basketball team represented the University of Colorado Boulder during the 2019–20 NCAA Division I women's basketball season. The Buffaloes, led by fourth year head coach JR Payne, played their home games at the CU Events Center and were a member of the Pac-12 Conference.

== Roster ==
2019–20 Colorado Buffaloes women's basketball team
Players
Coaches

Pos.	#	Name	Height	Year	Previous school	Hometown
G	0	Quinessa Caylao-Do	5 ft 8 in (1.73 m)	Sr	Bellevue	Tacoma, WA
G	1	Jaylyn Sherrod	5 ft 7 in (1.7 m)	Fr	Rasmay	Birmingham, AL
G	3	Emma Clarke	6 ft 1 in (1.85 m)	So	Australian Institute of Sport	Perth, Western Australia
G	4	Lesila Finau	5 ft 10 in (1.78 m)	So	Dublin	Dublin, CA
G	11	Zuzanna Kulinska	5 ft 10 in (1.78 m)	So	New York Military	Gdynia, Poland
G/F	14	Raanee Smith	6 ft 2 in (1.88 m)	Fr	Friends' Central	Philadelphia, PA
C	20	Maura Singer	6 ft 4 in (1.93 m)	Fr	Columbine	Littleton, CO
G/F	21	Mya Hollingshed	6 ft 3 in (1.91 m)	RS Jr	Bellaire	Houston, TX
G	24	Aubrey Knight	6 ft 0 in (1.83 m)	RS So	Ventura	Ventura, CA
F	25	Annika Jank	6 ft 3 in (1.91 m)	Jr	Edina	Edina, MN
C	30	Kai Volcy	6 ft 4 in (1.93 m)	So	The Hun School	Bloomfield, NJ
F	33	Sirena Tuitele	6 ft 1 in (1.85 m)	So	Pleasant Valley	Chico, CA
F	45	Charlotte Whittaker	6 ft 3 in (1.91 m)	RS Fr	St Andrew's College	Ventura, CA

Head coach

- JR Payne (Saint Mary's)

Assistant coach(es)

- Toriano Towns (Saint Mary's)
- Alex Earl (Arizona State)
- Shandrika Lee (Pepperdine)

Legend

- (C) Team captain
- (S) Suspended
- (I) Ineligible
- (W) Walk-on
- Injured
- Current redshirt

Roster

== Schedule ==
Date time, TV	Rank^{#}	Opponent^{#}	Result	Record	Site (attendance) city, state
Exhibition
11/04/2019*; 7:00 pm		Regis	W 92–45		CU Events Center; Boulder, CO
Non-conference regular season
11/10/2019*; 12:00 pm		NJIT	W 80–57	1–0	CU Events Center (1,436); Boulder, CO
11/14/2019*; 7:00 pm		Wisconsin	W 74–57	2–0	CU Events Center (1,759); Boulder, CO
11/17/2019*; 1:00 pm		at Wyoming	W 66–56	3–0	Arena-Auditorium (2,531); Laramie, WY
11/22/2019*; 5:00 pm		at Colorado State	W 79–75	4–0	Moby Arena (1,194); Fort Collins, CO
11/24/2019*; 6:00 pm		Jacksonville	W 66–44	5–0	CU Events Center (1,401); Boulder, CO
11/26/2019*; 2:00 pm		Indiana State	W 59–46	6–0	CU Events Center (1,069); Boulder, CO
12/03/2019*; 7:00 pm		Texas Southern	W 74–50	7–0	CU Events Center (1,116); Boulder, CO
12/06/2019*; 5:00 pm		at Xavier	W 62–53	8–0	Cintas Center (615); Cincinnati, OH
12/12/2019*; 7:00 pm		Denver	W 96–70	9–0	CU Events Center (1,774); Boulder, CO
12/20/2019*; 12:00 pm		vs. UAB; Tulane Classic	W 77–69 ^{OT}	10–0	Devlin Fieldhouse (520); New Orleans, LA
12/21/2019*; 2:00 pm		at Tulane; Tulane Classic	W 62–52	11–0	Devlin Fieldhouse (703); New Orleans, LA
Pac-12 regular season
12/29/2019; 2:00 pm, P12N		at Utah	W 80–70	12–0 (1–0)	Jon M. Huntsman Center (2,415); Salt Lake City, UT
01/03/2020; 8:00 pm, P12N		at No. 2 Oregon	L 46–104	12–1 (1–1)	Matthew Knight Arena (10,483); Eugene, OR
01/05/2020; 1:00 pm, P12N		at No. 3 Oregon State	L 60–72	12–2 (1–2)	Gill Coliseum (5,320); Corvallis, OR
01/10/2020; 7:00 pm, P12N		USC	W 66–53	13–2 (2–2)	CU Events Center (1,824); Boulder, CO
01/12/2020; 12:00 pm, P12N		No. 8 UCLA	L 62–65	13–3 (2–3)	CU Events Center (2,808); Boulder, CO
01/17/2020; 6:30 pm, P12N		Utah	L 69–84	13–4 (2–4)	CU Events Center (1,956); Boulder, CO
01/24/2020; 8:00 pm, P12N		at No. 6 Stanford	L 68–76 ^{OT}	13–5 (2–5)	Maples Pavilion (2,808); Stanford, CA
01/26/2020; 1:00 pm, P12N		at California	W 62–50	14–5 (3–5)	Haas Pavilion (1,823); Berkeley, CA
01/30/2020; 6:00 pm, P12N		No. 10 Oregon State	L 52–79	14–6 (3–6)	CU Events Center (1,900); Boulder, CO
02/01/2020; 2:00 pm, P12N		No. 3 Oregon	L 53–101	14–7 (3–7)	CU Events Center (3,669); Boulder, CO
02/07/2020; 8:00 pm, P12N		at Washington State	L 59–69	14–8 (3–8)	Beasley Coliseum (747); Pullman, WA
02/09/2020; 1:00 pm, P12N		at Washington	L 52–61	14–9 (3–9)	Alaska Airlines Arena (2,576); Seattle, WA
02/14/2020; 7:00 pm, P12N		California	W 64–57	15–9 (4–9)	CU Events Center (1,602); Boulder, CO
02/16/2020; 12:00 pm, P12N		No. 8 Stanford	L 66–69	15–10 (4–10)	CU Events Center (3,481); Boulder, CO
02/21/2020; 7:00 pm, P12N		No. 21 Arizona State	L 52–61	15–11 (4–11)	CU Events Center (2,135); Boulder, CO
02/23/2020; 12:00 pm, P12N		No. 11 Arizona	W 50–38	16–11 (5–11)	CU Events Center (3,085); Boulder, CO
02/28/2020; 9:00 pm, P12N		at No. 9 UCLA	L 62–65	16–12 (5–12)	Pauley Pavilion (1,937); Los Angeles, CA
03/01/2020; 1:00 pm, P12N		at USC	L 55–66	16–13 (5–13)	Galen Center (4,227); Los Angeles, CA
Pac-12 Women's Tournament
03/05/2020; 7:00 pm, P12N	(10)	vs. (7) USC; First Round	L 54–69	16–14	Mandalay Bay Events Center; Paradise, NV
*Non-conference game. ^{#}Rankings from AP Poll. (#) Tournament seedings in parentheses. All times are in Mountain Time.

== Rankings ==
2019–20 NCAA Division I women's basketball rankings

Regular season polls
Poll	Pre- season	Week 2	Week 3	Week 4	Week 5	Week 6	Week 7	Week 8	Week 9	Week 10	Week 11	Week 12	Week 13	Week 14	Week 15	Week 16	Week 17	Week 18	Week 19	Final
AP					RV	RV	RV	RV	RV											N/A
Coaches																				

Legend
	Increase in ranking
	Decrease in ranking
	No change
(RV)	Received votes
(NR)	Not ranked

== See also ==
2019–20 Colorado Buffaloes men's basketball team
