= 2019–20 Arizona Wildcats women's basketball team =

American college basketball season

2019–20 Arizona Wildcats women's basketball
- Conference: Pac-12 Conference

Ranking
- Coaches: No. 12
- AP: No. 12
- Record: 24–7 (12–6 Pac-12)
- Head coach: Adia Barnes (4th season)
- Assistant coaches: Tamisha Augustin; Salvo Coppa; Jackie Nared
- Home arena: McKale Center

2019–20 Pac-12 Conference women's basketball standings
| | Conf. | | | | Overall |
| Team | W | | L | PCT | W | | L | PCT |
|---|---|---|---|---|---|---|---|---|
| No. 2 Oregon† | 17 | – | 1 | .944 | 31 | – | 2 | .939 |
| No. 10 UCLA | 14 | – | 4 | .778 | 26 | – | 5 | .839 |
| No. 7 Stanford | 14 | – | 4 | .778 | 27 | – | 6 | .818 |
| No. 13 Arizona | 12 | – | 6 | .667 | 24 | – | 7 | .774 |
| No. 14 Oregon State | 10 | – | 8 | .556 | 23 | – | 9 | .719 |
| No. 25 Arizona State | 10 | – | 8 | .556 | 20 | – | 11 | .645 |
| USC | 8 | – | 10 | .444 | 17 | – | 14 | .548 |
| Utah | 6 | – | 12 | .333 | 14 | – | 17 | .452 |
| Colorado | 5 | – | 13 | .278 | 16 | – | 14 | .533 |
| Washington | 5 | – | 13 | .278 | 13 | – | 17 | .433 |
| Washington State | 4 | – | 14 | .222 | 11 | – | 20 | .355 |
| California | 3 | – | 15 | .167 | 12 | – | 19 | .387 |
† 2020 Pac-12 Tournament winner Rankings from AP poll

The 2019–20 Arizona Wildcats women's basketball team represented University of Arizona during the 2019–20 NCAA Division I women's basketball season. The Wildcats, led by fourth-year head coach Adia Barnes, played their home games at the McKale Center and are members of the Pac-12 Conference.

== Previous season ==
They finished the season 24–13, 7–11 in Pac-12 play to finish in a tie for sixth place. They advanced to the quarterfinals of the Pac-12 women's tournament where they lost to Oregon. They received an at-large bid to the Women's National Invitation Tournament, where they advanced to the finals and defeated Northwestern for the championship.

== Roster ==
2019–20 Arizona Wildcats women's basketball team
Players
Coaches

| Pos. | # | Name | Height | Year | Previous school | Hometown |
|---|---|---|---|---|---|---|
| G | 0 | Amari Carter | 5 ft 8 in (1.73 m) | RS Sr | St. John's College; Penn State | Washington, D.C. |
| G | 1 | Shaina Pellington (redshirt) | 5 ft 8 in (1.73 m) | Jr | Dunbarton; Oklahoma | Pickering, ON |
| G | 2 | Aari McDonald | 5 ft 7 in (1.7 m) | RS Jr | Brookside Christian HS; Washington | Fresno, CA |
| G | 3 | Tara Manumaleuga | 5 ft 10 in (1.78 m) | Fr | Hillcrest Christian | Gold Coast, QLD, Australia |
| G | 4 | Lucia Alonso | 5 ft 7 in (1.7 m) | Sr | Aron Leon Cuna Del Parlamentarismo | León, Spain |
| G | 10 | Tee Tee Starks | 5 ft 9 in (1.75 m) | RS Sr | Hopkins/Iowa State | Brooklyn Park, MN |
| G | 11 | Mara Mote | 5 ft 11 in (1.8 m) | Fr | TTT Riga | Cēsis, Latvia |
| F | 12 | Zeynep Şevval Gül | 6 ft 3 in (1.91 m) | Fr | Fenerbahçe | Istanbul, Turkey |
| G | 13 | Helena Pueyo | 6 ft 3 in (1.91 m) | Fr | Segle XXI | Palma de Mallorca, Spain |
| F | 14 | Sam Thomas | 6 ft 0 in (1.83 m) | Jr | Centennial | Bloomfield Hills, MI |
| F | 15 | Birna Valgerður Benónýsdóttir | 6 ft 3 in (1.91 m) | Fr | Keflavík | Keflavík, Iceland |
| F | 20 | Dominique McBryde | 6 ft 2 in (1.88 m) | RS Sr | Bedford North Lawrence; Purdue | Bedford, IN |
| G | 24 | Bryce Nixon | 5 ft 10 in (1.78 m) | So | Arcadia | Phoenix, AZ |
| F | 25 | Cate Reese | 6 ft 2 in (1.88 m) | So | Cypress | Cypress, TX |
| C | 34 | Semaj Smith | 6 ft 6 in (1.98 m) | So | St. Anthony | Long Beach, CA |

Head coach

- Adia Barnes (Arizona)

Assistant coach(es)

- Tamisha Augustin (Alabama A&M)
- Salvo Coppa (IULM)
- Jackie Nared (Saint Mary's)

Legend

- (C) Team captain
- (S) Suspended
- (I) Ineligible
- (W) Walk-on
- Injured
- Current redshirt

Roster

== Schedule ==
| Date time, TV | Rank^{#} | Opponent^{#} | Result | Record | Site (attendance) city, state |
Exhibition
| Oct 27, 2019*; 4:30 pm | | Eastern New Mexico | W 85–38 | | McKale Center; Tucson, AZ |
Non-conference regular season
| Nov 5, 2019*; 6:30 pm | | North Dakota | W 74–42 | 1–0 | McKale Center (3,450); Tucson, AZ |
| Nov 8, 2019*; 6:30 pm | | Santa Clara | W 65–52 | 2–0 | McKale Center (4,225); Tucson, AZ |
| Nov 12, 2019*; 5:00 pm | | at Chicago State | W 82–50 | 3–0 | Jones Convocation Center (122); Chicago, IL |
| Nov 17, 2019*; 12:00 pm, LHN | | at No. 22 Texas | W 83–58 | 4–0 | Frank Erwin Center (3,147); Austin, TX |
| Nov 20, 2019*; 11:00 am | | Prairie View A&M | W 83–48 | 5–0 | McKale Center (8,542); Tucson, AZ |
| Nov 24, 2019*; 2:00 pm | | at Montana | W 77–42 | 6–0 | Dahlberg Arena (2,758); Missoula, MT |
| Nov 29, 2019*; 4:00 pm | No. 24 | UC Riverside | W 70–27 | 7–0 | McKale Center (4,417); Tucson, AZ |
| Dec 2, 2019*; 6:30 pm | No. 20 | Monmouth | W 86–34 | 8–0 | McKale Center (3,525); Tucson, AZ |
| Dec 7, 2019*; 1:00 pm | No. 20 | at UTEP | W 54–43 | 9–0 | Don Haskins Center (1,019); El Paso, TX |
| Dec 12, 2019*; 1:00 pm | No. 18 | Tennessee State | W 77–42 | 10–0 | McKale Center (3,891); Tucson, AZ |
| Dec 21, 2019*; 1:00 pm | No. 18 | UC Santa Barbara | W 61–42 | 11–0 | McKale Center (4,498); Tucson, AZ |
Pac-12 regular season
| Dec 29, 2019; 12:00 pm, P12N | No. 18 | at Arizona State | W 58–53 | 12–0 (1–0) | Desert Financial Arena (4,009); Tempe, AZ |
| Jan 3, 2020; 8:00 pm, P12N | No. 18 | at USC | W 65–57 | 13–0 (2–0) | Galen Center (509); Los Angeles, CA |
| Jan 5, 2020; 1:00 pm, P12N | No. 18 | at No. 10 UCLA | L 58–70 | 13–1 (2–1) | Pauley Pavilion (3,011); Los Angeles, CA |
| Jan 10, 2020; 8:00 pm, P12N | No. 18 | No. 3 Oregon State | L 61–63 | 13–2 (2–2) | McKale Center (5,694); Tucson, AZ |
| Jan 12, 2020; 12:00 pm, P12N | No. 18 | No. 2 Oregon | L 64–71 | 13–3 (2–3) | McKale Center (7,680); Tucson, AZ |
| Jan 17, 2020; 8:00 pm, P12N | No. 21 | at Washington State | W 74–67 | 14–3 (3–3) | Beasley Coliseum (704); Pullman, WA |
| Jan 19, 2020; 1:00 pm, P12N | No. 21 | at Washington | W 66–58 | 15–3 (4–3) | Alaska Airlines Arena (2,151); Seattle, WA |
| Jan 24, 2020; 6:00 pm, P12N | No. 18 | No. 16 Arizona State | W 59–53 | 16–3 (5–3) | McKale Center (10,160); Tucson, AZ |
| Jan 31, 2020; 6:00 pm, P12N | No. 16 | No. 8 UCLA | W 92–66 | 17–3 (6–3) | McKale Center (7,407); Tucson, AZ |
| Feb 2, 2020; 12:00 pm, P12N | No. 16 | USC | W 73–57 | 18–3 (7–3) | McKale Center (5,027); Tucson, AZ |
| Feb 7, 2020; 7:00 pm, P12N | No. 12 | at No. 3 Oregon | L 52–85 | 18–4 (7–4) | Matthew Knight Arena (11,692); Eugene, OR |
| Feb 9, 2020; 1:00 pm, P12N | No. 12 | at No. 9 Oregon State | W 65–58 ^{OT} | 19–4 (8–4) | Gill Coliseum (5,682); Corvallis, OR |
| Feb 14, 2020; 7:00 pm, P12N | No. 12 | Washington | W 64–53 | 20–4 (9–4) | McKale Center (6,381); Tucson, AZ |
| Feb 16, 2020; 12:00 pm, P12N | No. 12 | Washington State | W 72–57 | 21–4 (10–4) | McKale Center (5,658); Tucson, AZ |
| Feb 21, 2020; 7:00 pm, P12N | No. 11 | at Utah | W 85–69 | 22–4 (11–4) | Jon M. Huntsman Center (3,374); Salt Lake City, UT |
| Feb 23, 2020; 12:00 pm, P12N | No. 11 | at Colorado | L 38–50 | 22–5 (11–5) | CU Events Center (3,085); Boulder, CO |
| Feb 28, 2020; 6:00 pm, P12N | No. 13 | No. 4 Stanford | W 73–72 ^{OT} | 23–5 (12–5) | McKale Center (7,838); Tucson, AZ |
| Mar 1, 2020; 12:00 pm, P12N | No. 13 | California | L 54–55 | 23–6 (12–6) | McKale Center (6,705); Tucson, AZ |
Pac-12 Women's Tournament
| Mar 6, 2020; 12:30 pm, P12N | (4) No. 13 | vs. (12) California; Quarterfinals | W 86–73 | 24–6 | Mandalay Bay Events Center; Paradise, NV |
| Mar 7, 2020; 7:00 pm, P12N | (4) No. 13 | vs. (1) No. 3 Oregon; Semifinals | L 70–88 | 24–7 | Mandalay Bay Events Center; Paradise, NV |
*Non-conference game. ^{#}Rankings from AP Poll. (#) Tournament seedings in parentheses. All times are in Mountain Time.

== Rankings ==
Ranking movement Legend: ██ Increase in ranking. ██ Decrease in ranking. NR = Not ranked. RV = Received votes.
| Poll | Pre | Wk 2 | Wk 3 | Wk 4 | Wk 5 | Wk 6 | Wk 7 | Wk 8 | Wk 9 | Wk 10 | Wk 11 | Wk 12 | Wk 13 | Wk 14 | Wk 15 | Wk 16 | Wk 17 | Wk 18 | Wk 19 | Final |
|---|---|---|---|---|---|---|---|---|---|---|---|---|---|---|---|---|---|---|---|---|
| AP | RV | RV | RV | 24 | 20 | 18 | 18 | 18 | 18 | 18 | 21 | 18 | 16 | 12 | 12 | 11 | 13 | 13 | 13 | 12 |
| Coaches | RV | RV | 24 | 22 | 19-T | 19 | 19 | 18 | 18 | 19 | 22 | 19 | 17 | 12-T | 12 | 11 | 13 | 14 | 12 | 12 |

== See also ==
2019–20 Arizona Wildcats men's basketball team
