= 2019–20 California Golden Bears women's basketball team =

American college basketball season

2019–20 California Golden Bears women's basketball

Cal Classic Champions
- Conference: Pac-12 Conference
- Record: 12–19 (3–15 Pac-12)
- Head coach: Charmin Smith (1st season)
- Assistant coaches: Kai Felton; Wendale Farrow; April Phillips
- Home arena: Haas Pavilion

2019–20 Pac-12 Conference women's basketball standings
	Conf.				Overall
Team	W		L	PCT	W		L	PCT
No. 2 Oregon†	17	–	1	.944	31	–	2	.939
No. 10 UCLA	14	–	4	.778	26	–	5	.839
No. 7 Stanford	14	–	4	.778	27	–	6	.818
No. 13 Arizona	12	–	6	.667	24	–	7	.774
No. 14 Oregon State	10	–	8	.556	23	–	9	.719
No. 25 Arizona State	10	–	8	.556	20	–	11	.645
USC	8	–	10	.444	17	–	14	.548
Utah	6	–	12	.333	14	–	17	.452
Colorado	5	–	13	.278	16	–	14	.533
Washington	5	–	13	.278	13	–	17	.433
Washington State	4	–	14	.222	11	–	20	.355
California	3	–	15	.167	12	–	19	.387
† 2020 Pac-12 Tournament winner Rankings from AP poll

The 2019–20 California Golden Bears women's basketball team represented University of California, Berkeley during the 2019–20 NCAA Division I women's basketball season. The Golden Bears, led by first year head coach Charmin Smith, played their home games at the Haas Pavilion as members of the Pac-12 Conference.

== Roster ==
2019–20 California Golden Bears women's basketball team
Players
Coaches

Pos.	#	Name	Height	Year	Previous school	Hometown
G	1	Leilani McIntosh	5 ft 5 in (1.65 m)	Fr	Xavier College Prep	Phoenix, AZ
G	2	Cailyn Crocker	5 ft 9 in (1.75 m)	Fr	Mater Dei	Cypress, CA
F	4	Alaysia Styles	6 ft 3 in (1.91 m)	Jr	La Jolla Country Day School	San Diego, CA
C	5	Chen Yue	6 ft 7 in (2.01 m)	RS Sr	Tsinghua University	Beijing, China
G	10	Jazlen Green	5 ft 11 in (1.8 m)	Fr	Lakeside	Upland, CA
G	11	Sara Anastasieska	5 ft 11 in (1.8 m)	RS Sr	Monte Sant Angelo Mercy; UTSA	Sydney, Australia
G	21	Mi'Cole Cayton	5 ft 9 in (1.75 m)	RS Jr	Saint Mary's College	Stockton, CA
G	22	Archer Olson	6 ft 0 in (1.83 m)	Jr	Henry M. Gunn	Palo Alto, CA
F	24	Evelien Lutje Schipholt	6 ft 2 in (1.88 m)	Fr	Caland Lyceum	The Hague, The Netherlands
F	30	Celeste West	6 ft 4 in (1.93 m)	Sr	Garces Memorial	Bakersfield, CA
G	33	Jaelyn Brown	6 ft 1 in (1.85 m)	Sr	Vista Murrieta	Murrieta, CA
G	34	Sierra Richey	5 ft 10 in (1.78 m)	So	Rancho Campana	Camarillo, CA

Head coach

- Charmin Smith (Stanford)

Assistant coach(es)

- Kai Felton (Randolph–Macon)
- Wendale Farrow (Eastern Michigan)
- April Phillips (Xavier)

Legend

- (C) Team captain
- (S) Suspended
- (I) Ineligible
- (W) Walk-on
- Injured
- Current redshirt

Roster

== Schedule ==
Date time, TV	Rank^{#}	Opponent^{#}	Result	Record	Site (attendance) city, state
Exhibition
11/03/2019*; 2:00 pm		Vanguard	W 79–55		Haas Pavilion; Berkeley, CA
Non-conference regular season
11/08/2019*; 4:00 pm, ESPN+		at Harvard	L 53–56	0–1	Lavietes Pavilion (778); Cambridge, MA
11/10/2019*; 10:00 am, SNY		at No. 5 UConn	L 61–72	0–2	Harry A. Gampel Pavilion (9,294); Storrs, CT
11/17/2019*; 5:00 pm		UC Riverside	W 84–61	1–2	Haas Pavilion (1,268); Berkeley, CA
11/21/2019*; 6:30 pm		at San Diego State	W 74–48	2–2	Viejas Arena (557); San Diego, CA
11/24/2019*; 2:00 pm		No. 20 Arkansas	W 84–80	3–2	Haas Pavilion (1,032); Berkeley, CA
11/29/2019*; 1:00 pm		North Carolina Central; Cal Classic semifinals	W 90–69	4–2	Haas Pavilion (734); Berkeley, CA
11/30/2019*; 3:15 pm		Long Beach State; Cal Classic championship	W 68–45	5–2	Haas Pavilion (1,015); Berkeley, CA
12/07/2019*; 2:00 pm		Boston University	W 73–62	6–2	Haas Pavilion (1,207); Berkeley, CA
12/14/2019*; 4:30 pm, P12N		Santa Clara	W 69–65	7–2	Haas Pavilion (1,037); Berkeley, CA
12/21/2019*; 4:00 pm		No. 14 Kentucky	L 61–63	7–3	Haas Pavilion (1,426); Berkeley, CA
12/29/2019*; 7:00 pm		Grand Canyon	W 72–53	8–3	Haas Pavilion (2,228); Berkeley, CA
Pac-12 regular season
01/03/2020; 7:00 pm, P12N		Washington	L 64–67	8–4 (0–1)	Haas Pavilion (1,597); Berkeley, CA
01/05/2020; 12:00 pm, P12N		Washington State	L 75–96	8–5 (0–2)	Haas Pavilion (1,318); Berkeley, CA
01/10/2020; 7:00 pm, P12N		at No. 5 Stanford	L 40–73	8–6 (0–3)	Maples Pavilion (3,540); Stanford, CA
01/12/2020; 5:00 pm, P12N		No. 5 Stanford	L 65–79	8–7 (0–4)	Haas Pavilion (6,724); Berkeley, CA
01/17/2020; 7:00 pm, P12N		at No. 8 Oregon State	L 44–81	8–8 (0–5)	Gill Coliseum (5,579); Corvallis, OR
01/19/2020; 2:00 pm, P12N		at No. 6 Oregon	L 55–105	8–9 (0–6)	Matthew Knight Arena (10,725); Eugene, OR
01/24/2020; 12:00 pm, P12N		Utah	L 62–71	8–10 (0–7)	Haas Pavilion (4,445); Berkeley, CA
01/26/2020; 12:00 pm, P12N		Colorado	L 50–62	8–11 (0–8)	Haas Pavilion (1,823); Berkeley, CA
01/31/2020; 7:00 pm, P12N		at Washington State	L 66–92	8–12 (0–9)	Beasley Coliseum (1,024); Pullman, WA
02/02/2020; 2:00 pm, P12N		at Washington	W 81–74 ^{OT}	9–12 (1–9)	Alaska Airlines Arena (2,144); Seattle, WA
02/07/2020; 7:00 pm, P12N		USC	L 67–75	9–13 (1–10)	Haas Pavilion (1,556); Berkeley, CA
02/09/2020; 2:00 pm, P12N		No. 10 UCLA	L 70–74 ^{OT}	9–14 (1–11)	Haas Pavilion (2,447); Berkeley, CA
02/14/2020; 6:00 pm, P12N		at Colorado	L 57–64	9–15 (1–12)	CU Events Center (1,602); Boulder, CO
02/16/2020; 11:00 am, P12N		at Utah	W 88–74	10–15 (2–12)	Jon M. Huntsman Center (2,757); Salt Lake City, UT
02/21/2020; 6:00 pm, P12N		No. 3 Oregon	L 61–93	10–16 (2–13)	Haas Pavilion (4,518); Berkeley, CA
02/23/2020; 2:00 pm, P12N		No. 15 Oregon State	L 63–76	10–17 (2–14)	Haas Pavilion (2,486); Berkeley, CA
02/28/2020; 7:00 pm, P12N		at No. 24 Arizona State	L 54–77	10–18 (2–15)	Desert Financial Arena (4,201); Tempe, AZ
03/01/2020; 11:00 am, P12N		at No. 13 Arizona	W 55–54	11–18 (3–15)	McKale Center (6,705); Tucson, AZ
Pac-12 Women's Tournament
03/05/2020; 11:30 am, P12N	(12)	vs. (5) No. 24 Arizona State; First Round	W 71–67	12–18	Mandalay Bay Events Center; Paradise, NV
03/06/2020; 11:30 am, P12N	(12)	vs. (4) No. 13 Arizona; Quarterfinals	L 73–86	12–19	Mandalay Bay Events Center; Paradise, NV
*Non-conference game. ^{#}Rankings from AP Poll. (#) Tournament seedings in parentheses. All times are in Pacific Time.

== Rankings ==
Ranking movement Legend: ██ Increase in ranking. ██ Decrease in ranking. NR = Not ranked. RV = Received votes.
Poll	Pre	Wk 2	Wk 3	Wk 4	Wk 5	Wk 6	Wk 7	Wk 8	Wk 9	Wk 10	Wk 11	Wk 12	Wk 13	Wk 14	Wk 15	Wk 16	Wk 17	Wk 18	Wk 19	Final
AP				RV																N/A
Coaches	RV																			

^Coaches did not release a Week 2 poll.

== See also ==
2019–20 California Golden Bears men's basketball team
