= 2019–20 Stanford Cardinal women's basketball team =

Intercollegiate basketball season

2019–20 Stanford Cardinal women's basketball
- Conference: Pac-12 Conference

Ranking
- Coaches: No. 6
- AP: No. 7
- Record: 27–6 (14–4 Pac-12)
- Head coach: Tara VanDerveer (34th season)
- Associate head coach: Kate Paye (13th season)
- Assistant coaches: Tempie Brown (7th season); Lindy La Rocque (3rd season)
- Home arena: Maples Pavilion

2019–20 Pac-12 Conference women's basketball standings
	Conf.				Overall
Team	W		L	PCT	W		L	PCT
No. 2 Oregon†	17	–	1	.944	31	–	2	.939
No. 10 UCLA	14	–	4	.778	26	–	5	.839
No. 7 Stanford	14	–	4	.778	27	–	6	.818
No. 13 Arizona	12	–	6	.667	24	–	7	.774
No. 14 Oregon State	10	–	8	.556	23	–	9	.719
No. 25 Arizona State	10	–	8	.556	20	–	11	.645
USC	8	–	10	.444	17	–	14	.548
Utah	6	–	12	.333	14	–	17	.452
Colorado	5	–	13	.278	16	–	14	.533
Washington	5	–	13	.278	13	–	17	.433
Washington State	4	–	14	.222	11	–	20	.355
California	3	–	15	.167	12	–	19	.387
† 2020 Pac-12 Tournament winner Rankings from AP poll

The 2019–20 Stanford Cardinal women's basketball team represented Stanford University during the 2019–20 NCAA Division I women's basketball season. The Cardinal, who were led by thirty-fourth year head coach Tara VanDerveer, played their home games at the Maples Pavilion and were members of the Pac-12 Conference.

== Roster ==
2019–20 Stanford Cardinal women's basketball team
Players
Coaches

Pos.	#	Name	Height	Year	Previous school	Hometown
G	3	Anna Wilson	5 ft 9 in (1.75 m)	Sr	Bellevue	Bellevue, WA
F	4	Nadia Fingall	6 ft 3 in (1.91 m)	Sr	Choctawhatchee	Navarre, FL
F	5	Francesca Belibi	6 ft 1 in (1.85 m)	Fr	Regis Jesuit	Centennial, CO
F	10	Alyssa Jerome	6 ft 2 in (1.88 m)	Jr	Harbord Collegiate	Toronto, ON
F	11	Ashten Prechtel	6 ft 5 in (1.96 m)	Fr	Discovery Canyon	Colorado Springs, CO
F	12	Lexie Hull	6 ft 2 in (1.88 m)	So	Central Valley	Spokane, WA
G	14	Mikaela Brewer	5 ft 8 in (1.73 m)	Sr	Innisdale Secondary School	Barrie, ON
F	15	Maya Dodson	6 ft 3 in (1.91 m)	Jr	St. Francis	Alpharetta, GA
F	20	Estella Moschkau	6 ft 1 in (1.85 m)	Jr	Edgewood	Madison, WI
G	21	DiJonai Carrington	5 ft 11 in (1.8 m)	Sr	Horizon Christian Academy	San Diego, CA
G	23	Kiana Williams	5 ft 8 in (1.73 m)	Jr	Karen Wagner	San Antonio, TX
F	24	Lacie Hull	6 ft 2 in (1.88 m)	So	Central Valley	Spokane, WA
G	30	Haley Jones	6 ft 1 in (1.85 m)	Fr	Archbishop Mitty	Santa Cruz, CA
G	33	Hannah Jump	6 ft 0 in (1.83 m)	Fr	Pinewood	San Jose, CA
G	54	Jenna Brown	5 ft 10 in (1.78 m)	So	The Lovett School	Atlanta, GA

Head coach

- Tara VanDerveer (Indiana)

Assistant coach(es)

- Lindy La Rocque (Stanford)
- Tempie Brown (Michigan)
- Kate Paye (Stanford)

Legend

- (C) Team captain
- (S) Suspended
- (I) Ineligible
- (W) Walk-on
- Injured
- Current redshirt

Roster
Last update: November 7, 2019

== Schedule ==
Date time, TV	Rank^{#}	Opponent^{#}	Result	Record	Site (attendance) city, state
Exhibition
10/29/2019*; 7:00 pm	No. 3	Beijing Normal	W 100–58		Maples Pavilion; Stanford, CA
11/4/2019*; 4:00 pm, P12N	No. 3	USA Basketball	L 80–95		Maples Pavilion; Stanford, CA
Non-conference regular season
11/05/2019*; 7:00 pm	No. 3	Eastern Washington	W 92–27	1–0	Maples Pavilion (2,277); Stanford, CA
11/09/2019*; 3:00 pm	No. 3	at San Francisco	W 97–71	2–0	Chase Center (3,025); San Francisco, CA
11/14/2019*; 7:00 pm	No. 3	Northern Colorado	W 90–36	3–0	Maples Pavilion (2,361); Stanford, CA
11/17/2019*; 5:00 pm	No. 3	Gonzaga	W 76–70 ^{OT}	4–0	Maples Pavilion (2,863); Stanford, CA
11/24/2019*; 2:00 pm	No. 3	Buffalo	W 88–69	5–0	Maples Pavilion (2,590); Stanford, CA
11/28/2019*; 7:30 pm	No. 3	vs. California Baptist; Greater Victoria Invitational quarterfinal	W 83–78	6–0	University of Victoria (1,001); Victoria, BC
11/29/2019*; 7:30 pm	No. 3	vs. No. 18 Syracuse; Greater Victoria Invitational semifinal	W 77–59	7–0	University of Victoria; Victoria, BC
11/30/2019*; 7:30 pm	No. 3	vs. No. 10 Mississippi State; Greater Victoria Invitational	W 67–62	8–0	University of Victoria; Victoria, BC
12/15/2019*; 5:30 pm, P12N	No. 1	Ohio State	W 71–52	9–0	Maples Pavilion (2,970); Stanford, CA
12/18/2019*; 5:30 pm, P12N	No. 1	No. 23 Tennessee; Rivalry	W 78–51	10–0	Maples Pavilion (4,676); Stanford, CA
12/22/2019*; 10:00 am, ESPN2	No. 1	at Texas	L 64–69	10–1	Frank Erwin Center (3,952); Austin, TX
12/28/2019*; 2:00 pm	No. 5	UC Davis	W 67–55	11–1	Maples Pavilion (2,871); Stanford, CA
Pac-12 regular season
01/03/2020; 7:00 pm, P12N	No. 5	Washington State	W 77–58	12–1 (1–0)	Maples Pavilion (2,643); Stanford, CA
01/05/2020; 2:00 pm, P12N	No. 5	Washington	W 77–56	13–1 (2–0)	Maples Pavilion (3,273); Stanford, CA
01/10/2020; 7:00 pm, P12N	No. 5	California	W 73–40	14–1 (3–0)	Maples Pavilion (3,529); Stanford, CA
01/12/2020; 5:00 pm, P12N	No. 5	at California	W 79–65	15–1 (4–0)	Haas Pavilion (6,724); Berkeley, CA
01/16/2020; 6:00 pm, ESPN	No. 3	at No. 6 Oregon	L 55–87	15–2 (4–1)	Matthew Knight Arena (12,218); Eugene, OR
01/19/2020; 12:00 pm, P12N	No. 3	at No. 8 Oregon State	W 61–58	16–2 (5–1)	Gill Coliseum (8,667); Corvallis, OR
01/24/2020; 7:00 pm, P12N	No. 6	Colorado	W 76–68 ^{OT}	17–2 (6–1)	Maples Pavilion (2,829); Stanford, CA
01/26/2020; 12:00 pm, P12N	No. 6	Utah	W 82–49	18–2 (7–1)	Maples Pavilion (3,369); Stanford, CA
01/31/2020; 7:00 pm, P12N	No. 6	at Washington	W 59–41	19–2 (8–1)	Alaska Airlines Arena (2,112); Seattle, WA
02/02/2020; 12:00 pm, P12N	No. 6	at Washington State	W 71–49	20–2 (9–1)	Beasley Coliseum (709); Pullman, WA
02/07/2020; 8:00 pm, P12N	No. 6	No. 10 UCLA	L 69–79	20–3 (9–2)	Maples Pavilion (4,530); Stanford, CA
02/09/2020; 12:00 pm, P12N	No. 6	USC	W 79–59	21–3 (10–2)	Maples Pavilion (5,221); Stanford, CA
02/14/2020; 6:00 pm, P12N	No. 8	at Utah	W 97–64	22–3 (11–2)	Jon M. Huntsman Center (3,314); Salt Lake City, UT
02/16/2020; 11:00 am, P12N	No. 8	at Colorado	W 69–66	23–3 (12–2)	CU Events Center (3,481); Boulder, CO
02/21/2020; 9:00 pm, P12N	No. 4	No. 15 Oregon State	W 63–60	24–3 (13–2)	Maples Pavilion (3,745); Stanford, CA
02/24/2020; 6:00 pm, ESPN2	No. 4	No. 3 Oregon	L 66–74	24–4 (13–3)	Maples Pavilion (6,511); Stanford, CA
02/28/2020; 5:00 pm, P12N	No. 4	at No. 13 Arizona	L 72–73 ^{OT}	24–5 (13–4)	McKale Center (7,838); Tucson, AZ
03/01/2020; 11:00 am, P12N	No. 4	at No. 24 Arizona State	W 55–44	25–5 (14–4)	Desert Financial Arena (4,928); Tempe, AZ
Pac-12 Women's Tournament
03/06/2020; 8:30 pm, P12N	(3) No. 7	vs. (6) No. 14 Oregon State; Quarterfinals	W 68–57	26–5	Mandalay Bay Events Center (5,548); Paradise, NV
03/07/2020; 8:30 pm, P12N	(3) No. 7	vs. (2) No. 8 UCLA; Semifinals	W 67–51	27–5	Mandalay Bay Events Center (7,266); Paradise, NV
03/08/2020; 5:00 pm, ESPN2	(3) No. 7	vs. (1) No. 3 Oregon; Championship Game	L 56–89	27–6	Mandalay Bay Events Center; Paradise, NV
*Non-conference game. ^{#}Rankings from AP Poll. (#) Tournament seedings in parentheses. All times are in Pacific Time.

== Rankings ==
2019–20 NCAA Division I women's basketball rankings

Regular season polls
Poll	Pre- Season	Week 2	Week 3	Week 4	Week 5	Week 6	Week 7	Week 8	Week 9	Week 10	Week 11	Week 12	Week 13	Week 14	Week 15	Week 16	Week 17	Week 18	Week 19	Final
AP	3	3	3	3	1 (23)	1 (27)	1 (27)	5	5	5	3 (1)	6	6	6	8	4	4	7	7	7
Coaches	3	3^	3	3	1 (24)	1 (28)	1 (27)	4 (2)	4	3 (2)	6	6	5	7	4	6	6	8	7	6

Legend
	Increase in ranking
	Decrease in ranking
	Not ranked previous week
RV	Received votes
NR	Not Rranked
( )	First place votes received

^Coaches did not release Week 2 poll

== See also ==
2019–20 Stanford Cardinal men's basketball team
