= 2019–20 Utah Utes women's basketball team =

American college basketball season

2019–20 Utah Utes women's basketball

Bank of Hawaii Classic Champions
- Conference: Pac-12 Conference
- Record: 14–17 (6–12 Pac–12)
- Head coach: Lynne Roberts (5th season)
- Associate head coach: Gavin Petersen
- Assistant coaches: Danyelle Snelgro; Joanna Reitz
- Home arena: Jon M. Huntsman Center

2019–20 Pac-12 Conference women's basketball standings
	Conf.				Overall
Team	W		L	PCT	W		L	PCT
No. 2 Oregon†	17	–	1	.944	31	–	2	.939
No. 10 UCLA	14	–	4	.778	26	–	5	.839
No. 7 Stanford	14	–	4	.778	27	–	6	.818
No. 13 Arizona	12	–	6	.667	24	–	7	.774
No. 14 Oregon State	10	–	8	.556	23	–	9	.719
No. 25 Arizona State	10	–	8	.556	20	–	11	.645
USC	8	–	10	.444	17	–	14	.548
Utah	6	–	12	.333	14	–	17	.452
Colorado	5	–	13	.278	16	–	14	.533
Washington	5	–	13	.278	13	–	17	.433
Washington State	4	–	14	.222	11	–	20	.355
California	3	–	15	.167	12	–	19	.387
† 2020 Pac-12 Tournament winner Rankings from AP poll

The 2019–20 Utah Utes women's basketball team represented the University of Utah during the 2019–20 NCAA Division I women's basketball season. The Utes, led by fifth-year head coach Lynne Roberts, played their home games at the Jon M. Huntsman Center and were members of the Pac-12 Conference.

== Roster ==
2019–20 Utah Utes women's basketball team
Players
Coaches

Pos.	#	Name	Height	Year	Previous school	Hometown
G	0	Kiana Moore	5 ft 7 in (1.7 m)	Sr	Vanden HS	Fairfield, CA
F	1	Zuzanna Puc (redshirt)	6 ft 2 in (1.88 m)	Sr	ZSMS Poznan; UTEP	Poznań, Poland
F	3	Andreas Torres	6 ft 2 in (1.88 m)	So	Montmorency (CEGEP)	Montreal, QC
G	10	Dru Gylten	5 ft 11 in (1.8 m)	RS So	St. Thomas More HS	Rapid City, SD
G	11	Brynna Maxwell	6 ft 0 in (1.83 m)	Fr	Gig Harbor HS	Gig Harbor, WA
F	12	Lola Pendande	6 ft 3 in (1.91 m)	RS Fr	Ribet Academy	Roquetas de Mar, Spain
G/F	14	Niyah Becker	6 ft 2 in (1.88 m)	So	Lincoln Prep	Winnipeg, MB
G	15	Kemery Martin	6 ft 0 in (1.83 m)	Fr	Corner Canyon HS	Sandy, UT
F	21	Maurane Corbin	6 ft 5 in (1.96 m)	RS So	Montmorency (CEGEP)	Saint-Bruno-de-Montarville, QC
G/F	23	Daneesha Provo	5 ft 11 in (1.8 m)	RS Sr	Kent School; Clemson	Dartmouth, NS
G	25	Julie Brosseau	5 ft 9 in (1.75 m)	RS Jr	Collège Montmorency; Maine	Repentigny, QC
F	34	Aubri Noti	6 ft 1 in (1.85 m)	So	Doherty HS; Iowa Western	Colorado Springs, CO
G/F	35	Ola Makurat	6 ft 2 in (1.88 m)	RS Jr	Sport Championship School; Liberty	Sierakowice, Poland

Head coach

- Lynne Roberts (Seattle Pacific)

Assistant coach(es)

- Gavin Petersen (Hawaiʻi)
- Danyelle Snelgro (Utah State)
- Joanna Reitz (Covenant)

Legend

- (C) Team captain
- (S) Suspended
- (I) Ineligible
- (W) Walk-on
- Injured
- Current redshirt

Roster

== Schedule and results ==
Date time, TV	Rank^{#}	Opponent^{#}	Result	Record	Site (attendance) city, state
Exhibition
10/31/2019*; 11:00 am		Westminster College	W 88–58		Jon M. Huntsman Center (6,004); Salt Lake City, UT
Non-conference regular season
11/05/2019*; 5:00 pm		at Cincinnati	L 62–68	0–1	Fifth Third Arena (737); Cincinnati, OH
11/07/2019*; 5:00 pm		at Xavier	L 63–70	0–2	Cintas Center (1,026); Cincinnati, OH
11/16/2019*; 12:00 pm		South Dakota	L 81–84 ^{OT}	0–3	Jon M. Huntsman Center (2,139); Salt Lake City, UT
11/18/2019*; 7:00 pm		Eastern Washington	W 87–49	1–3	Jon M. Huntsman Center (2,024); Salt Lake City, UT
11/22/2019*; 3:00 pm		vs. Texas Southern; Bank of Hawaii Classic	W 61–52	2–3	Stan Sheriff Center; Honolulu, HI
11/24/2019*; 3:00 pm		vs. UTSA; Bank of Hawaii Classic	W 91–45	3–3	Stan Sheriff Center; Honolulu, HI
11/29/2019*; 7:00 pm		at BYU; Rivalry/Old Oquirrh Bucket	W 77–73 ^{OT}	4–3	Marriott Center (1,117); Provo, UT
12/05/2019*; 7:00 pm		Oral Roberts	W 78–58	5–3	Jon M. Huntsman Center (2,162); Salt Lake City, UT
12/14/2019*; 11:30 am		Nevada	W 68–62	6–3	Jon M. Huntsman Center (2,596); Salt Lake City, UT
12/16/2019*; 7:00 pm		Providence	L 60–67	6–4	Jon M. Huntsman Center (2,351); Salt Lake City, UT
12/20/2019*; 12:00 pm		Weber State; Old Oquirrh Bucket	W 75–46	7–4	Jon M. Huntsman Center (2,434); Salt Lake City, UT
Pac-12 regular season
12/29/2019; 2:00 pm, P12N		Colorado	L 70–80	7–5 (0–1)	Jon M. Huntsman Center (2,415); Salt Lake City, UT
01/03/2020; 8:00 pm, P12N		at No. 3 Oregon State	L 48–77	7–6 (0–2)	Gill Coliseum (5,629); Corvallis, OR
01/05/2020; 3:00 pm, P12N		at No. 2 Oregon	L 51–88	7–7 (0–3)	Matthew Knight Arena (10,490); Eugene, OR
01/10/2020; 7:00 pm, P12N		No. 8 UCLA	L 54–84	7–8 (0–4)	Jon M. Huntsman Center (3,053); Salt Lake City, UT
01/12/2020; 12:00 pm, P12N		USC	W 67–65	8–8 (1–4)	Jon M. Huntsman Center (2,383); Salt Lake City, UT
01/17/2020; 6:30 pm, P12N		at Colorado	W 84–69	9–8 (2–4)	CU Events Center (1,956); Boulder, CO
01/24/2020; 1:00 pm, P12N		at California	W 71–62	10–8 (3–4)	Haas Pavilion (4,445); Berkeley, CA
01/26/2020; 1:00 pm, P12N		at No. 6 Stanford	L 49–82	10–9 (3–5)	Maples Pavilion (3,369); Stanford, CA
01/30/2020; 7:00 pm, P12N		No. 3 Oregon	L 63–90	10–10 (3–6)	Jon M. Huntsman Center (3,326); Salt Lake City, UT
02/01/2020; 12:00 pm, P12N		No. 10 Oregon State	L 65–77	10–11 (3–7)	Jon M. Huntsman Center (3,298); Salt Lake City, UT
02/07/2020; 8:00 pm, P12N		at Washington	W 74–65	11–11 (4–7)	Alaska Airlines Arena (1,847); Seattle, WA
02/09/2020; 1:00 pm, P12N		at Washington State	W 78–66	12–11 (5–7)	Beasley Coliseum (757); Pullman, WA
02/14/2020; 7:00 pm, P12N		No. 8 Stanford	L 64–97	12–12 (5–8)	Jon M. Huntsman Center (3,314); Salt Lake City, UT
02/16/2020; 12:00 pm, P12N		California	L 74–88	12–13 (5–9)	Jon M. Huntsman Center (2,757); Salt Lake City, UT
02/21/2020; 7:00 pm, P12N		No. 11 Arizona	L 69–85	12–14 (5–10)	Jon M. Huntsman Center (3,374); Salt Lake City, UT
02/23/2020; 12:00 pm, P12N		No. 21 Arizona State	W 75–71	13–14 (6–10)	Jon M. Huntsman Center (3,072); Salt Lake City, UT
02/28/2020; 7:00 pm, P12N		at USC	L 66–69	13–15 (6–11)	Galen Center (511); Los Angeles, CA
03/01/2020; 2:00 pm, P12N		at No. 9 UCLA	L 54–77	13–16 (6–12)	Pauley Pavilion (2,899); Los Angeles, CA
Pac-12 Women's Tournament
03/05/2020; 3:00 pm, P12N	(8)	vs. (9) Washington; First Round	W 72–63	14–16	Mandalay Bay Events Center (3,361); Paradise, NV
03/06/2020; 3:00 pm, P12N	(8)	vs. (1) No. 3 Oregon; Quarterfinals	L 59–79	14–17	Mandalay Bay Events Center (6,782); Paradise, NV
*Non-conference game. ^{#}Rankings from AP Poll/Coaches' Poll. (#) Tournament seedings in parentheses. All times are in Mountain Time.

== Rankings ==
+ Regular season polls	Poll	Pre- season	Week 2	Week 3	Week 4	Week 5	Week 6	Week 7	Week 8	Week 9	Week 10	Week 11	Week 12	Week 13	Week 14	Week 15	Week 16	Week 17	Week 18	Week 19	Final
AP																				N/A	
Coaches																					

Legend
	Increase in ranking
	Decrease in ranking
	No change
(RV)	Received votes
(NR)	Not ranked

== See also ==
- 2019–20 Utah Utes men's basketball team
