= 2019–20 Oregon Ducks women's basketball team =

Intercollegiate basketball season

2019–20 Oregon Ducks women's basketball

Pac-12 Tournament champions Pac-12 regular season champions
- Conference: Pac-12 Conference

Ranking
- Coaches: No. 2
- AP: No. 2
- Record: 31–2 (17–1 Pac-12)
- Head coach: Kelly Graves (6th season)
- Assistant coaches: Mark Campbell; Jodie Berry; Xavier López
- Home arena: Matthew Knight Arena

2019–20 Pac-12 Conference women's basketball standings
	Conf.				Overall
Team	W		L	PCT	W		L	PCT
No. 2 Oregon†	17	–	1	.944	31	–	2	.939
No. 10 UCLA	14	–	4	.778	26	–	5	.839
No. 7 Stanford	14	–	4	.778	27	–	6	.818
No. 13 Arizona	12	–	6	.667	24	–	7	.774
No. 14 Oregon State	10	–	8	.556	23	–	9	.719
No. 25 Arizona State	10	–	8	.556	20	–	11	.645
USC	8	–	10	.444	17	–	14	.548
Utah	6	–	12	.333	14	–	17	.452
Colorado	5	–	13	.278	16	–	14	.533
Washington	5	–	13	.278	13	–	17	.433
Washington State	4	–	14	.222	11	–	20	.355
California	3	–	15	.167	12	–	19	.387
† 2020 Pac-12 Tournament winner Rankings from AP poll

The 2019–20 Oregon Ducks women's basketball team represented the University of Oregon during the 2019–20 NCAA Division I women's basketball season. The Ducks, led by sixth-year head coach Kelly Graves, played home games at the Matthew Knight Arena as members of the Pac-12 Conference.

== Offseason ==
=== Departures ===
Name	Number	Pos.	Height	Year	Hometown	Reason left
Maite Cazorla	5	Guard	5'10"	Senior	Las Palmas, Spain	Graduated
Oti Gildon	32	Forward	6'1"	Senior	Spokane, WA	Graduated

=== Incoming transfers ===
Name	Number	Pos.	Height	Year	Hometown	Date eligible	Years eligible	Previous school
Minyon Moore	23	Guard	5'8"	Senior	Hercules, CA	October 1, 2019	1	USC
Sedona Prince	32	Forward	6'7"	Freshman (RS)	Liberty Hill, TX	October 1, 2020	3	Texas

=== Recruiting class of 2019 ===
College recruiting information
Name	Hometown	School	Height	Weight	Commit date
Jaz Shelley; G	Moe, VIC, Australia	Berwick College/ Centre of Excellence	5 ft 9 in (1.75 m)	N/A	
Jaz Shelley; G	Recruit ratings: ESPN: (90)				
Holly Winterburn; G	Northampton, England	Charnwood College	5 ft 10 in (1.78 m)	N/A	
Holly Winterburn; G	Recruit ratings: ESPN: (90)				
Lucy Cochrane; F	Melbourne, Australia	Catholic Ladies College	6 ft 5 in (1.96 m)	N/A	
Lucy Cochrane; F	Recruit ratings: No ratings found				
Overall recruit ranking:
Note: In many cases, Scout, Rivals, 247Sports, On3, and ESPN may conflict in their listings of height and weight.; In these cases, the average was taken. ESPN grades are on a 100-point scale.; Sources: "2019 Player Commits". ESPN. Archived from the original on October 31, 2019.

- ESPN did not include Cochrane in its list of 2019 Oregon recruits.

=== Recruiting class of 2020 ===
College recruiting information
Name	Hometown	School	Height	Weight	Commit date
Sydney Parrish; G	Fishers, IN	Hamilton Southeastern	6 ft 0 in (1.83 m)	N/A	Nov 13, 2019
Sydney Parrish; G	Recruit ratings: ESPN: (98)				
Kylee Watson; F	Linwood, NJ	Mainland	6 ft 3 in (1.91 m)	N/A	Nov 13, 2019
Kylee Watson; F	Recruit ratings: ESPN: (98)				
Maddie Scherr; G	Florence, KY	Ryle	5 ft 11 in (1.80 m)	N/A	Nov 18, 2019
Maddie Scherr; G	Recruit ratings: ESPN: (98)				
Angela Dugalic; F	Des Plaines, IL	Maine West	6 ft 4 in (1.93 m)	N/A	Nov 13, 2019
Angela Dugalic; F	Recruit ratings: ESPN: (97)				
Te-Hina Paopao; G	San Diego, CA	La Jolla Country Day	5 ft 9 in (1.75 m)	N/A	Nov 13, 2019
Te-Hina Paopao; G	Recruit ratings: ESPN: (97)				
Overall recruit ranking: ESPN: 1
Note: In many cases, Scout, Rivals, 247Sports, On3, and ESPN may conflict in their listings of height and weight.; In these cases, the average was taken. ESPN grades are on a 100-point scale.; Sources: "2020 Team Ranking". Rivals.

== Roster ==
2019–20 Oregon Ducks women's basketball team
Players
Coaches

Pos.	#	Name	Height	Year	Previous school	Hometown
F	0	Satou Sabally	6 ft 4 in (1.93 m)	Jr	Rotteck Gymnasium	Berlin, Germany
F	1	Nyara Sabally (injured)	6 ft 5 in (1.96 m)	RS Fr	Rotteck Gymnasium	Berlin, Germany
G	2	Morgan Yaeger	5 ft 9 in (1.75 m)	RS Jr	St. John's School	Adelaide, Australia
G	3	Taylor Chavez	5 ft 10 in (1.78 m)	So	Valley Vista	Surprise, AZ
G	4	Jaz Shelley	5 ft 9 in (1.75 m)	Fr	Berwick College	Moe, VIC, Australia
G	11	Holly Winterburn	5 ft 10 in (1.78 m)	Fr	Charnwood College	Northampton, England
F	12	Lucy Cochrane	6 ft 5 in (1.96 m)	Fr	Catholic Ladies College	Melbourne, Australia
F	14	Lydia Giomi	6 ft 6 in (1.98 m)	RS Jr	West Seattle HS	Seattle, WA
G	20	Sabrina Ionescu	5 ft 11 in (1.8 m)	Sr	Miramonte HS	Walnut Creek, CA
F	21	Erin Boley	6 ft 2 in (1.88 m)	RS Jr	Elizabethtown HS; Notre Dame	Hodgenville, KY
G	23	Minyon Moore	5 ft 8 in (1.73 m)	Sr	Salesian Prep; USC	Hercules, CA
F	24	Ruthy Hebard	6 ft 4 in (1.93 m)	Sr	West Valley HS	Fairbanks, AK
F	32	Sedona Prince (redshirt)	6 ft 7 in (2.01 m)	Fr	Liberty Hill HS; Texas	Liberty Hill, TX

Head coach

- Kelly Graves (New Mexico)

Assistant coach(es)

- Mark Campbell (Hawaiʻi)
- Jodie Berry (Western Washington)
- Xavier López (Point Loma)

Legend

- (C) Team captain
- (S) Suspended
- (I) Ineligible
- (W) Walk-on
- Injured
- Current redshirt

Roster
Last update: October 31, 2019

== Schedule ==
Date time, TV	Rank^{#}	Opponent^{#}	Result	Record	Site (attendance) city, state
Exhibition
11/09/2019*; 4:00 pm, P12N	No. 1	USA	W 93–86	0–0	Matthew Knight Arena (11,530); Eugene, OR
12/28/2019*; 2:00 pm	No. 2	Corban	W 125–42	10–1	Matthew Knight Arena (9,447); Eugene, OR
Regular season
11/11/2019*; 3:00 pm, Oregon Live Stream	No. 1	Northeastern	W 89–47	1–0	Matthew Knight Arena (8,253); Eugene, OR
11/13/2019*; 6:00 pm, Oregon Live Stream	No. 1	Utah State	W 109–52	2–0	Matthew Knight Arena (8,334); Eugene, OR
11/16/2019*; 2:00 pm, Oregon Live Stream	No. 1	Texas Southern	W 99–63	3–0	Matthew Knight Arena (9,159); Eugene, OR
11/24/2019*; 1:00 pm, ACCN	No. 1	at No. 17 Syracuse	W 81–64	4–0	Carrier Dome (3,091); Syracuse, NY
11/28/2019*; 12:15 pm, FloHoops	No. 1	vs. Oklahoma State; Paradise Jam	W 89–72	5–0	Sports and Fitness Center; Saint Thomas, VI
11/29/2019*; 12:15 pm, FloHoops	No. 1	vs. UT Arlington; Paradise Jam	W 91–54	6–0	Sports and Fitness Center; Saint Thomas, VI
11/30/2019*; 12:15 pm, FloHoops	No. 1	vs. No. 8 Louisville; Paradise Jam	L 62–72	6–1	Sports and Fitness Center; Saint Thomas, VI
12/08/2019*; 12 noon, P12N	No. 3	South Dakota State	W 95–56	7–1	Matthew Knight Arena (9,560); Eugene, OR
12/14/2019*; 1:00 pm	No. 3	at Long Beach State	W 81–45	8–1	Walter Pyramid (1,278); Long Beach, CA
12/16/2019*; 11:00 am, Oregon Live Stream	No. 3	UC Riverside	W 84–41	9–1	Matthew Knight Arena (11,705); Eugene, OR
12/21/2019*; 12 noon, Oregon Live Stream	No. 3	Kansas State	W 89–51	10–1	Matthew Knight Arena (10,706); Eugene, OR
01/03/2020; 7:00 pm, P12N	No. 2	Colorado	W 104–46	11–1 (1–0)	Matthew Knight Arena (10,483); Eugene, OR
01/05/2020; 2:00 pm, P12N	No. 2	Utah	W 88–51	12–1 (2–0)	Matthew Knight Arena (10,490); Eugene, OR
01/10/2020; 5:00 pm, P12N	No. 2	at Arizona State	L 66–72	12–2 (2–1)	Wells Fargo Arena (3,958); Tempe, AZ
01/12/2020; 11:00 am, P12N	No. 2	at No. 18 Arizona	W 71–64	13–2 (3–1)	McKale Center (7,680); Tucson, AZ
01/16/2020; 6:00 pm, ESPN	No. 6	No. 3 Stanford	W 87–55	14–2 (4–1)	Matthew Knight Arena (12,218); Eugene, OR
01/19/2020; 2:00 pm, P12N	No. 6	California	W 105–55	15–2 (5–1)	Matthew Knight Arena (10,725); Eugene, OR
01/24/2020; 7:00 pm, P12N	No. 4	No. 7 Oregon State; Civil War	W 76–64	16–2 (6–1)	Matthew Knight Arena (12,364); Eugene, OR
01/26/2020; 1:00 pm, ESPNews	No. 4	at No. 7 Oregon State; Civil War	W 66−57	17–2 (7–1)	Gill Coliseum (9,301); Corvallis, OR
01/30/2020; 7:00 pm, P12N	No. 3	at Utah	W 90–63	18–2 (8–1)	Jon M. Huntsman Center (3,326); Salt Lake City, UT
02/01/2020; 1:00 pm, P12N	No. 3	at Colorado	W 101–53	19–2 (9–1)	CU Events Center (3,669); Boulder, CO
02/03/2020*; 4:00 pm, ESPN2	No. 3	at No. 4 UConn	W 74–56	20–2	Harry A. Gampel Pavilion (10,167); Storrs, CT
02/07/2020; 6:00 pm, P12N	No. 3	No. 12 Arizona	W 85–52	21–2 (10–1)	Matthew Knight Arena (11,692); Eugene, OR
02/09/2020; 2:00 pm, P12N	No. 3	No. 19 Arizona State	W 79–48	22–2 (11–1)	Matthew Knight Arena (12,364); Eugene, OR
02/14/2020; 8:00 pm, P12N	No. 3	at No. 7 UCLA	W 80–66	23–2 (12–1)	Pauley Pavilion (5,912); Los Angeles, CA
02/16/2020; 1:00 pm, P12N	No. 3	at USC	W 93–67	24–2 (13–1)	Galen Center (2,123); Los Angeles, CA
02/21/2020; 6:00 pm, P12N	No. 3	at California	W 93–61	25–2 (14–1)	Haas Pavilion (4,518); Berkeley, CA
02/24/2020; 6:00 pm, ESPN2	No. 3	at No. 4 Stanford	W 74–66	26–2 (15–1)	Maples Pavilion (6,511); Stanford, CA
02/28/2020; 8:00 pm, P12N	No. 3	Washington State	W 88–57	27–2 (16–1)	Matthew Knight Arena (12,364); Eugene, OR
03/01/2020; 12 noon, P12N	No. 3	Washington	W 92–56	28–2 (17–1)	Matthew Knight Arena (12,364); Eugene, OR
Pac-12 Women's Tournament
03/06/2020; 2:00 pm, P12N	(1) No. 3	vs. (8) Utah; Quarterfinals	W 79–59	29–2	Mandalay Bay Events Center (6,782); Paradise, NV
03/07/2020; 6:00 pm, P12N	(1) No. 3	vs. (4) No. 13 Arizona; Semifinals	W 88–70	30–2	Mandalay Bay Events Center (7,266); Paradise, NV
03/08/2020; 5:00 pm, ESPN2	(1) No. 3	vs. (3) No. 7 Stanford; Championship	W 89–56	31–2	Mandalay Bay Events Center (6,794); Paradise, NV
NCAA Women's Tournament
Not held due to the COVID-19 pandemic
*Non-conference game. ^{#}Rankings from AP Poll. (#) Tournament seedings in parentheses. All times are in Pacific Time.

== Rankings ==
Ranking movement Legend: ██ Increase in ranking. ██ Decrease in ranking. NR = Not ranked. RV = Received votes. () = First place votes.
Poll	Pre	Wk 2	Wk 3	Wk 4	Wk 5	Wk 6	Wk 7	Wk 8	Wk 9	Wk 10	Wk 11	Wk 12	Wk 13	Wk 14	Wk 15	Wk 16	Wk 17	Wk 18	Wk 19	Final
AP	1 (25)	1 (28)	1 (27)	1 (28)	3	3 (1)	3 (1)	2 (5)	2 (5)	2 (7)	6	4	3	3	3	3	3	3 (1)	2 (3)	2 (4)
Coaches	1 (24)	1^	1 (30)	1 (29)	3 (1)	3	3	2 (4)	2 (6)	2 (5)	6	4	3	3	3	3	3	3 (3)	2 (5)	2 (6)

^Coaches did not release a Week 2 poll.

== See also ==
- 2019–20 Oregon Ducks men's basketball team
