= 2019–20 UCLA Bruins women's basketball team =

American college basketball season

2019–20 UCLA Bruins women's basketball
- Conference: Pac-12 Conference

Ranking
- Coaches: No. 9
- AP: No. 10
- Record: 26–5 (14–4 Pac-12)
- Head coach: Cori Close (9th season)
- Associate head coach: Shannon Perry-LeBeauf
- Assistant coaches: Tasha Brown; Tony Newnan
- Home arena: Pauley Pavilion

2019–20 Pac-12 Conference women's basketball standings
	Conf.				Overall
Team	W		L	PCT	W		L	PCT
No. 2 Oregon†	17	–	1	.944	31	–	2	.939
No. 10 UCLA	14	–	4	.778	26	–	5	.839
No. 7 Stanford	14	–	4	.778	27	–	6	.818
No. 13 Arizona	12	–	6	.667	24	–	7	.774
No. 14 Oregon State	10	–	8	.556	23	–	9	.719
No. 25 Arizona State	10	–	8	.556	20	–	11	.645
USC	8	–	10	.444	17	–	14	.548
Utah	6	–	12	.333	14	–	17	.452
Colorado	5	–	13	.278	16	–	14	.533
Washington	5	–	13	.278	13	–	17	.433
Washington State	4	–	14	.222	11	–	20	.355
California	3	–	15	.167	12	–	19	.387
† 2020 Pac-12 Tournament winner Rankings from AP poll

The 2019–20 UCLA Bruins women's basketball team represented the University of California, Los Angeles during the 2019–20 NCAA Division I women's basketball season. The Bruins, led by ninth year head coach Cori Close, played their home games at Pauley Pavilion and competed as members of the Pac-12 Conference.

Because of the COVID-19 pandemic, the NCAA Tournament was canceled. The Bruins finished the season 26–5 and 14–4 in conference play for a second-place tie in the Pac-12. They advanced to the semifinals of the Pac-12 Tournament, where they lost to Stanford. Had the NCAA Tournament not been canceled, the Bruins were projected to receive a #3-seed and to host a 1st/2nd Round pod. UCLA's overall winning percentage of .839 was its highest since the 2010–11 season, when the Bruins finished 28–5 (.848).

The Bruins were 17–0 when scoring at least 70 points and 22–0 when holding opponents to under 67 points.

== Offseason ==
=== Departures ===
Name	Pos.	Height	Year	Hometown	Reason for departure
Ahlana Smith	G	5'9"	Fr.	Charlotte, North Carolina	Transferred to Gulf Coast State College
Kennedy Burke	G	6'1"	Sr.	Northridge, California	Graduated; selected 22nd overall by the Dallas Wings in the 2019 WNBA draft
Lajahna Drummer	F	6'1"	RS Sr.	Inglewood, California	Graduated
Chrissy Baird	G	6'1"	RS Sr.	Wheaton, Illinois	Graduated
Shayley Harris	F/C	6'5"	Fr.	Redding, California	Transferred to Santa Clara

=== 2019 recruiting class ===
College recruiting information
Name	Hometown	School	Height	Weight	Commit date
Jaden Owens; G	Plano, TX	Plano West	5 ft 6 in (1.68 m)	N/A	
Jaden Owens; G	Recruit ratings: ESPN: (98)				
Charisma Osborne; G	Moreno Valley, CA	Windward School	5 ft 9 in (1.75 m)	N/A	
Charisma Osborne; G	Recruit ratings: ESPN: (98)				
Brynn Masikewich; F	Calgary, AB	Lincoln Prep	6 ft 2 in (1.88 m)	N/A	
Brynn Masikewich; F	Recruit ratings: ESPN: (90)				
Camryn Brown; G	Lewisville, TX	Prestonwood Christian	5 ft 11 in (1.80 m)	N/A	
Camryn Brown; G	Recruit ratings: ESPN: (90)				
Overall recruit ranking:
Note: In many cases, Scout, Rivals, 247Sports, On3, and ESPN may conflict in their listings of height and weight.; In these cases, the average was taken. ESPN grades are on a 100-point scale.; Sources:

== Roster ==
2019–20 UCLA Bruins women's basketball team
Players
Coaches

Pos.	#	Name	Height	Year	Previous school	Hometown
G	0	Chantel Horvat	6 ft 1 in (1.85 m)	Jr	Geelong College	Geelong, Australia
G	1	Kayla Owens	6 ft 1 in (1.85 m)	RS So	Langham Creek	Houston, TX
G	3	Kiara Jefferson	5 ft 9 in (1.75 m)	So	West Campus	Sacramento, CA
G	4	Lindsey Corsaro	6 ft 1 in (1.85 m)	RS So	Roncalli	Indianapolis, IN
F	5	Brynn Masikewich	6 ft 2 in (1.88 m)	Fr	Lincoln Prep	Calgary, Alberta
F	10	Ally Rosenblum	6 ft 4 in (1.93 m)	Sr	Mater Dei	Newport Coast, CA
G	13	Jaden Owens	5 ft 6 in (1.68 m)	Fr	Plano West	Plano, TX
G	20	Charisma Osborne	5 ft 9 in (1.75 m)	Fr	Windward School	Moreno Valley, CA
F	21	Michaela Onyenwere	6 ft 0 in (1.83 m)	Jr	Grandview	Aurora, CO
G	23	Natalie Chou	6 ft 1 in (1.85 m)	RS Jr	Plano West; Baylor	Plano, TX
G	24	Japreece Dean	5 ft 6 in (1.68 m)	Sr	Vista Ridge; Texas Tech	Austin, TX
F	33	Lauryn Miller	6 ft 1 in (1.85 m)	Jr	Kirkwood	Kirkwood, MO
G	35	Camryn Brown	5 ft 11 in (1.8 m)	Fr	Prestonwood Christian	Lewisville, TX
G	51	Eliana Sigal (W)	5 ft 10 in (1.78 m)	So	Tarbut V' Torah	Irvine, CA

Head coach

- Cori Close (UC Santa Barbara)

Assistant coach(es)

- Shannon Perry (Iowa)
- Tony Newnan (UC Santa Barbara)
- Tasha Brown (St. Ambrose)

Legend

- (C) Team captain
- (S) Suspended
- (I) Ineligible
- (W) Walk-on
- Injured
- Current redshirt

Roster
Last update: November 18, 2019

- March 7, 2019 - The NCAA granted Japreece Dean an additional year of eligibility since she played in only two games at the start of her sophomore year at Texas Tech before transferring to UCLA. However, because of those two games she played, she would have to sit out the first two games of the 2019–20 season.

== Schedule ==
Date time, TV	Rank^{#}	Opponent^{#}	Result	Record	Site (attendance) city, state
Non-conference regular season
11/05/2019*; 7:00 pm	No. 11	Weber State	W 85–55	1–0	Pauley Pavilion (1,259); Los Angeles, CA
11/09/2019*; 2:00 pm	No. 11	Loyola Marymount	W 74–52	2–0	Pauley Pavilion (2,317); Los Angeles, CA
11/14/2019*; 11:00 am	No. 11	Long Beach State	W 86–51	3–0	Pauley Pavilion (5,734); Los Angeles, CA
11/22/2019*; 7:00 pm	No. 11	Northern Colorado	W 92–58	4–0	Pauley Pavilion (1,201); Los Angeles, CA
11/26/2019*; 7:00 pm, P12N	No. 11	Yale	W 100–65	5–0	Pauley Pavilion (1,582); Los Angeles, CA
11/30/2019*; 1:30 pm	No. 11	vs. UCF; Cavalier Classic	W 61–56	6–0	John Paul Jones Arena; Charlottesville, VA
12/01/2019*; 12:30 pm, ACCNX	No. 11	at Virginia; Cavalier Classic	W 73–62	7–0	John Paul Jones Arena (2,621); Charlottesville, VA
12/07/2019*; 4:00 pm	No. 11	at CSUN	W 58–44	8–0	Matadome (685); Northridge, CA
12/15/2019*; 2:00 pm	No. 10	Pacific	W 68–57	9–0	Pauley Pavilion (1,502); Los Angeles, CA
12/19/2019*; 8:00 am, SECN	No. 10	at Georgia	W 59–50	10–0	Stegeman Coliseum (7,123); Athens, GA
12/22/2019*; 9:00 am, BTN	No. 10	at No. 12 Indiana	W 68–58	11–0	Simon Skjodt Assembly Hall (5,272); Bloomington, IN
Pac-12 regular season
12/29/2019; 1:00 pm, P12N	No. 10	USC; Rivalry	W 83–59	12–0 (1–0)	Pauley Pavilion (4,255); Los Angeles, CA
01/03/2020; 7:00 pm, P12N	No. 10	Arizona State	W 68–66	13–0 (2–0)	Pauley Pavilion (1,582); Los Angeles, CA
01/05/2020; 12:00 pm, P12N	No. 10	No. 18 Arizona	W 70–58	14–0 (3–0)	Pauley Pavilion (3,011); Los Angeles, CA
01/10/2020; 6:00 pm, P12N	No. 8	at Utah	W 84–54	15–0 (4–0)	Jon M. Huntsman Center (3,053); Salt Lake City, UT
01/12/2020; 11:00 am, P12N	No. 8	at Colorado	W 65–62	16–0 (5–0)	CU Events Center (2,808); Boulder, CO
01/17/2020; 7:30 pm, P12N	No. 7	at USC; Rivalry	L 68–70 ^{2OT}	16–1 (5–1)	Galen Center (1,527); Los Angeles, CA
01/24/2020; 7:00 pm, P12N	No. 10	Washington	W 85–80 ^{OT}	17–1 (6–1)	Pauley Pavilion (2,412); Los Angeles, CA
01/26/2020; 12:00 pm, P12N	No. 10	Washington State	W 66–50	18–1 (7–1)	Pauley Pavilion (2,501); Los Angeles, CA
01/31/2020; 5:00 pm, P12N	No. 8	at No. 16 Arizona	L 66–92	18–2 (7–2)	McKale Center (7,407); Tucson, AZ
02/02/2020; 11:00 am, P12N	No. 8	at No. 19 Arizona State	W 70–61	19–2 (8–2)	Desert Financial Arena (2,664); Tempe, AZ
02/07/2020; 8:00 pm, P12N	No. 10	at No. 6 Stanford	W 79–69	20–2 (9–2)	Maples Pavilion (4,530); Stanford, CA
02/09/2020; 2:00 pm, P12N	No. 10	at California	W 74–70 ^{OT}	21–2 (10–2)	Haas Pavilion (2,447); Berkeley, CA
02/14/2020; 8:00 pm, P12N	No. 7	No. 3 Oregon	L 66–80	21–3 (10–3)	Pauley Pavilion (5,912); Los Angeles, CA
02/17/2020; 6:00 pm, ESPN2	No. 8	No. 15 Oregon State	W 83–74 ^{OT}	22–3 (11–3)	Pauley Pavilion (5,994); Los Angeles, CA
02/21/2020; 7:00 pm, P12N	No. 8	at Washington State	W 70–62	23–3 (12–3)	Beasley Coliseum (956); Pullman, WA
02/23/2020; 12:00 pm, P12N	No. 8	at Washington	L 68–74	23–4 (12–4)	Alaska Airlines Arena (2,123); Seattle, WA
02/28/2020; 8:00 pm, P12N	No. 9	Colorado	W 62–52	24–4 (13–4)	Pauley Pavilion (1,937); Los Angeles, CA
03/01/2020; 1:00 pm, P12N	No. 9	Utah	W 77–54	25–4 (14–4)	Pauley Pavilion (2,899); Los Angeles, CA
Pac-12 Women's Tournament
03/06/2020; 6:00 pm, P12N	(2) No. 8	vs. (7) USC; Quarterfinals	W 73–66	26–4	Mandalay Bay Events Center; Paradise, NV
03/07/2020; 8:30 pm, P12N	(2) No. 8	vs. (3) No. 7 Stanford; Semifinals	L 51–67	26–5	Mandalay Bay Events Center (7,266); Paradise, NV
*Non-conference game. ^{#}Rankings from AP Poll. (#) Tournament seedings in parentheses. All times are in Pacific Time.

== Rankings ==
2019–20 NCAA Division I women's basketball rankings

Regular season polls
Poll	Pre- Season	Week 2	Week 3	Week 4	Week 5	Week 6	Week 7	Week 8	Week 9	Week 10	Week 11	Week 12	Week 13	Week 14	Week 15	Week 16	Week 17	Week 18	Week 19	Final
AP	11	11	11	11	11	10	10	10	10	8	7	10	8	10	7	8	9	8	10	10
Coaches	11	N/A	11	11	11	10	10	10	10	9	8	10	9	10	8	7	8	7	9	9

Legend
	Increase in ranking
	Decrease in ranking
	Not ranked previous week
(RV)	Received Votes
(NR)	Not Ranked

== Honors ==
- December 2, 2019 – Japreece Dean was named the Pac-12 Player of the Week
- December 23, 2019 – Michaela Onyenwere received her first-ever Pac-12 Player of the Week
- February 10, 2020 – Michaela Onyenwere was named the Pac-12 Player of the Week

== See also ==
2019–20 UCLA Bruins men's basketball team
