= 2020 Pac-12 Conference women's basketball tournament =

- Classification: Division I
- Season: 2019–20
- Teams: 12
- Site: Mandalay Bay Events Center; Las Vegas, NV
- Champions: Oregon (2nd title)
- Winning coach: Kelly Graves (2nd title)
- MVP: Sabrina Ionescu (Oregon)
- Attendance: 34,138
- Television: Pac-12 Network, ESPN2

2019–20 Pac-12 Conference women's basketball standings
	Conf.				Overall
Team	W		L	PCT	W		L	PCT
No. 2 Oregon†	17	–	1	.944	31	–	2	.939
No. 10 UCLA	14	–	4	.778	26	–	5	.839
No. 7 Stanford	14	–	4	.778	27	–	6	.818
No. 13 Arizona	12	–	6	.667	24	–	7	.774
No. 14 Oregon State	10	–	8	.556	23	–	9	.719
No. 25 Arizona State	10	–	8	.556	20	–	11	.645
USC	8	–	10	.444	17	–	14	.548
Utah	6	–	12	.333	14	–	17	.452
Colorado	5	–	13	.278	16	–	14	.533
Washington	5	–	13	.278	13	–	17	.433
Washington State	4	–	14	.222	11	–	20	.355
California	3	–	15	.167	12	–	19	.387
† 2020 Pac-12 Tournament winner Rankings from AP poll

The 2020 Pac-12 Conference women's basketball tournament presented by New York Life was a postseason tournament held March 5–8, 2020 at Mandalay Bay Events Center on the Las Vegas Strip in Paradise, Nevada.

== Seeds ==
Teams were seeded by conference record, with ties broken in the following order: Tie-breaking procedures for determining all tournament seeding was:

- For two-team tie

1. Results of head-to-head competition during the regular season.

2. Each team's record (won-lost percentage) vs. the team occupying the highest position in the final regular standings, and then continuing down through the standings until one team gains an advantage. When arriving at another group of tied teams while comparing records, use each team's record (won-lost percentage) against the collective tied teams as a group (prior to that group's own tie-breaking procedure), rather than the performance against individual tied teams.

3. Won-lost percentage against all Division I opponents.

4. Coin toss conducted by the Commissioner or designee.

- For multiple-team tie

1. Results (won-lost percentage) of collective head-to-head competition during the regular season among the tied teams.

2. If more than two teams are still tied, each of the tied team's record (won-lost percentage) vs. the team occupying the highest position in the final regular season standings, and then continuing down through the standings, eliminating teams with inferior records, until one team gains an advantage.

When arriving at another group of tied teams while comparing records, use each team's record (won-lost percentage) against the collective tied teams as a group (prior to that group's own tie-breaking procedure), rather than the performance against individual tied teams.

After one team has an advantage and is seeded, all remaining teams in the multiple-team tie-breaker will repeat the multiple-team tie-breaking procedure.

If at any point the multiple-team tie is reduced to two teams, the two-team tie-breaking procedure will be applied.

3. Won-lost percentage against all Division I opponents.

4. Coin toss conducted by the Commissioner or designee.

Seed	School	Conf	Overall	Tiebreaker 1	Tiebreaker 2
1	Oregon	17–1	28–2		
2	UCLA	14–4	25–4	1–0 vs Stanford	
3	Stanford	14–4	25–5	0-1 vs UCLA	
4	Arizona	12–6	23–6		
5	Arizona State	10–8	20–10	1–1 vs Oregon State	0–1 vs. Oregon
6	Oregon State	10–8	22–8	1–1 vs Arizona State	0–2 vs. Oregon
7	USC	8–10	16–13		
8	Utah	6–12	13–16		
9	Washington	5–13	13–16	1-0 vs Colorado	
10	Colorado	5–13	16–13	0-1 vs Washington	
11	Washington State	4–14	11–19		
12	California	3–15	11–18		

== Schedule ==
Thursday-Sunday, March 5–8, 2020

The top four seeds received a first-round bye.

Session	Game	Time*	Matchup^{#}	Television	Attendance
First Round – Thursday, March 5
1	1	11:30 AM	#5 Arizona State 67 vs. #12 California 71	P12N	3,361
1	2	2:00 PM	#8 Utah 72 vs. #9 Washington 63	P12N	3,361
2	3	6:00 PM	#7 USC 69 vs. #10 Colorado 54	P12N	4,387
2	4	8:30 PM	#6 Oregon State 82 vs. #11 Washington State 55	P12N	4,387
Quarterfinals – Friday, March 6
3	5	11:30 AM	#4 Arizona 86 vs #12 California 73	P12N	6,782
3	6	2:00 PM	#1 Oregon 79 vs #8 Utah 59	P12N	6,782
4	7	6:00 PM	#2 UCLA 73 vs. #7 USC 66	P12N	5,548
4	8	8:30 PM	#3 Stanford 68 vs. #6 Oregon State 57	P12N	5,548
Semifinals – Saturday, March 7
5	9	6:00 PM	#4 Arizona 70 vs. #1 Oregon 88	P12N	7,266
5	10	8:30 PM	#3 Stanford 67 vs. #2 UCLA 51	P12N	7,266
Championship Game – Sunday, March 8
6	11	5:00 PM	#1 Oregon 89 vs. #3 Stanford 56	ESPN2	6,794
*Game Times in PT.

== Bracket ==
First round Thursday, March 5 P12N
8	Utah	72
9	Washington	63
5	#24 Arizona State	67
12	California	71
7	USC	69
10	Colorado	54
6	#14 Oregon State	82
11	Washington State	55

Quarterfinals; Friday, March 6 P12N
1	#3 Oregon	79
8	Utah	59
4	#13 Arizona	86
12	California	73
2	#8 UCLA	73
7	USC	66
3	#7 Stanford	68
6	#14 Oregon State	57

Semifinals; Saturday, March 7 P12N
1	#3 Oregon	88
4	#13 Arizona	70
2	#8 UCLA	51
3	#7 Stanford	67

Championship Game; Sunday, March 8 ESPN2
1	#3 Oregon	89
3	#7 Stanford	56

Note: * denotes overtime

=== All-Tournament Team ===
Name	Pos.	Year	Team
Ruthy Hebard	F	Sr.	Oregon
Lexie Hull	G	So.	Stanford
Sabrina Ionescu	G	Sr.	Oregon
Aari McDonald	G	Jr.	Arizona
Michaela Onyenwere	F	Jr.	UCLA
Kiana Williams	G	Jr.	Stanford

=== Most Outstanding Player ===
Name	Pos.	Year	Team
Sabrina Ionescu	G	Sr.	Oregon

== See also ==
- 2020 Pac-12 Conference men's basketball tournament
