= 2019–20 Washington Huskies women's basketball team =

American college basketball season

2019–20 Washington Huskies women's basketball

Puerto Rico Clasico champions
- Conference: Pac-12 Conference
- Record: 13–17 (5–13 Pac-12)
- Head coach: Jody Wynn (3rd season)
- Associate head coach: Derek Wynn
- Assistant coaches: Michelle Augustavo; Paul Reed
- Home arena: Alaska Airlines Arena

2019–20 Pac-12 Conference women's basketball standings
| | Conf. | | | | Overall |
| Team | W | | L | PCT | W | | L | PCT |
|---|---|---|---|---|---|---|---|---|
| No. 2 Oregon† | 17 | – | 1 | .944 | 31 | – | 2 | .939 |
| No. 10 UCLA | 14 | – | 4 | .778 | 26 | – | 5 | .839 |
| No. 7 Stanford | 14 | – | 4 | .778 | 27 | – | 6 | .818 |
| No. 13 Arizona | 12 | – | 6 | .667 | 24 | – | 7 | .774 |
| No. 14 Oregon State | 10 | – | 8 | .556 | 23 | – | 9 | .719 |
| No. 25 Arizona State | 10 | – | 8 | .556 | 20 | – | 11 | .645 |
| USC | 8 | – | 10 | .444 | 17 | – | 14 | .548 |
| Utah | 6 | – | 12 | .333 | 14 | – | 17 | .452 |
| Colorado | 5 | – | 13 | .278 | 16 | – | 14 | .533 |
| Washington | 5 | – | 13 | .278 | 13 | – | 17 | .433 |
| Washington State | 4 | – | 14 | .222 | 11 | – | 20 | .355 |
| California | 3 | – | 15 | .167 | 12 | – | 19 | .387 |
† 2020 Pac-12 Tournament winner Rankings from AP poll

The 2019–20 Washington Huskies women's basketball team represented University of Washington during the 2019–20 NCAA Division I women's basketball season. The Huskies were led by third-year head coach Jody Wynn. They played their home games at Alaska Airlines Arena at Hec Edmundson Pavilion in Seattle, Washington as members of the Pac-12 Conference.

== Roster ==
2019–20 Washington Huskies women's basketball team
Players
Coaches

| Pos. | # | Name | Height | Year | Previous school | Hometown |
|---|---|---|---|---|---|---|
| C | 0 | Quay Miller | 6 ft 3 in (1.91 m) | Fr | Kentridge | Renton, WA |
| F | 3 | Mai-Loni Henson | 6 ft 1 in (1.85 m) | Sr | La Jolla Country Day | Temecula, CA |
| G | 4 | Amber Melgoza | 5 ft 10 in (1.78 m) | Sr | Santa Barbara | Santa Barbara, CA |
| F | 11 | Haley Van Dyke | 6 ft 1 in (1.85 m) | So | Campolindo | Moraga, CA |
| G | 15 | Nia Lowery | 5 ft 11 in (1.8 m) | Fr | C. K. McClatchy | Sacramento, CA |
| F | 20 | Khayla Rooks | 6 ft 1 in (1.85 m) | Jr | Mission Hills | San Marcos, CA |
| G | 21 | Rita Pleskevich | 5 ft 10 in (1.78 m) | Jr | 2030 School; Broward College | Moscow, Russia |
| C | 24 | Ali Bamberger | 6 ft 3 in (1.91 m) | Fr | Carondelet | Concord, CA |
| G | 25 | T. T. Watkins | 6 ft 0 in (1.83 m) | So | Walnut | Walnut, CA |
| F | 32 | Gigi Garcia | 6 ft 2 in (1.88 m) | RS Jr | C. K. McClatchy | Sacramento, CA |
| G | 35 | Alexis Griggsby | 5 ft 9 in (1.75 m) | Jr | Sierra Canyon | Northridge, CA |
| G | 41 | Callie Lind | 5 ft 9 in (1.75 m) | Fr | Eastlake | Sammamish, WA |
| G | 44 | Missy Peterson | 5 ft 11 in (1.8 m) | Jr | Edmonds-Woodway | Edmonds, WA |
| F | 53 | Darcy Rees | 6 ft 4 in (1.93 m) | So | Adelaide | Adelaide, South Australia |

Head coach

- Jody Wynn (USC)

Assistant coach(es)

- Derek Wynn (AHC, Cal State Fullerton)
- Michelle Augustavo (Washington)
- Paul Reed (Langston)

Legend

- (C) Team captain
- (S) Suspended
- (I) Ineligible
- (W) Walk-on
- Injured
- Current redshirt

Roster

== Schedule ==
| Date time, TV | Rank^{#} | Opponent^{#} | Result | Record | Site (attendance) city, state |
Non-conference regular season
| Nov 8, 2019*; 7:00 pm | | Cal State Bakersfield | W 80–49 | 1–0 | Alaska Airlines Arena (1,187); Seattle, WA |
| Nov 10, 2019*; 2:00 pm | | Tulane | L 62–64 | 1–1 | Alaska Airlines Arena (1,239); Seattle, WA |
| Nov 13, 2019*; 10:00 am | | Weber State | W 94–41 | 2–1 | Alaska Airlines Arena (1,355); Seattle, WA |
| Nov 23, 2019*; 2:00 pm | | Seattle | W 78–46 | 3–1 | Alaska Airlines Arena (1,723); Seattle, WA |
| Nov 28, 2019*; 9:00 am | | vs. Iona; Puerto Rico Clasico | W 65–34 | 4–1 | Coliseo Rubén Rodríguez (100); San Juan, PR |
| Nov 29, 2019*; 9:00 am | | vs. Howard; Puerto Rico Clasico | W 75–58 | 5–1 | Coliseo Rubén Rodríguez (100); San Juan, PR |
| Nov 30, 2019*; 9:00 am | | vs. Iowa; Puerto Rico Clasico | W 70–63 | 6–1 | Coliseo Rubén Rodríguez (100); San Juan, PR |
| Dec 8, 2019*; 7:30 pm | | Hawaii | L 50–62 | 6–2 | Alaska Airlines Arena (1,178); Seattle, WA |
| Dec 15, 2019*; 2:00 pm | | at San Diego | W 65–47 | 7–2 | Jenny Craig Pavilion (407); San Diego, CA |
| Dec 20, 2019*; 6:00 pm | | San Francisco; Husky Classic | W 73–54 | 8–2 | Alaska Airlines Arena (1,252); Seattle, WA |
| Dec 20, 2019*; 6:00 pm | | Vanderbilt; Husky Classic | L 74–76 ^{OT} | 8–3 | Alaska Airlines Arena (1,423); Seattle, WA |
Pac-12 regular season
| Dec 29, 2019; 2:00 pm, P12N | | at Washington State; Rivalry | W 65–56 | 9–3 (1–0) | Beasley Coliseum (503); Pullman, WA |
| Jan 3, 2020; 7:00 pm, P12N | | at California | W 67–64 | 10–3 (2–0) | Haas Pavilion (1,597); Berkeley, CA |
| Jan 5, 2020; 2:00 pm, P12N | | at No. 5 Stanford | L 56–77 | 10–4 (2–1) | Maples Pavilion (3,273); Berkeley, CA |
| Jan 11, 2020; 12:30 pm, P12N | | Washington State; Rivalry | L 59–66 | 10–5 (2–2) | Alaska Airlines Arena (2,374); Seattle, WA |
| Jan 17, 2020; 7:00 pm, P12N | | No. 18 Arizona State | L 50–67 | 10–6 (2–3) | Alaska Airlines Arena (1,579); Seattle, WA |
| Jan 19, 2020; 12:00 pm, P12N | | No. 21 Arizona | L 58–66 | 10–7 (2–4) | Alaska Airlines Arena (2,151); Seattle, WA |
| Jan 24, 2020; 7:00 pm, P12N | | at No. 10 UCLA | L 80–85 ^{OT} | 10–8 (2–5) | Pauley Pavilion (2,412); Los Angeles, CA |
| Jan 26, 2020; 12:00 pm, P12N | | at USC | L 78–81 ^{OT} | 10–9 (2–6) | Galen Center (1,267); Los Angeles, CA |
| Jan 31, 2019; 7:00 pm, P12N | | No. 6 Stanford | L 41–59 | 10–10 (2–7) | Alaska Airlines Arena (2,112); Seattle, WA |
| Feb 2, 2020; 2:00 pm, P12N | | California | L 74–81 ^{OT} | 10–11 (2–8) | Alaska Airlines Arena (2,144); Seattle, WA |
| Feb 7, 2020; 7:00 pm, P12N | | Utah | L 65–74 | 10–12 (2–9) | Alaska Airlines Arena (1,847); Seattle, WA |
| Feb 9, 2020; 12:00 pm, P12N | | Colorado | W 61–52 | 11–12 (3–9) | Alaska Airlines Arena (2,576); Seattle, WA |
| Feb 14, 2020; 6:00 pm, P12N | | at No. 12 Arizona | L 53–64 | 11–13 (3–10) | McKale Center (6,381); Tucson, AZ |
| Feb 16, 2020; 11:00 am, P12N | | at No. 22 Arizona State | L 59–62 | 11–14 (3–11) | Desert Financial Arena (2,645); Tempe, AZ |
| Feb 21, 2020; 7:00 pm, P12N | | USC | W 75–66 | 12–14 (4–11) | Alaska Airlines Arena (1,677); Seattle, WA |
| Feb 23, 2020; 12:00 pm, P12N | | No. 8 UCLA | W 74–68 | 13–14 (5–11) | Alaska Airlines Arena (2,123); Seattle, WA |
| Feb 28, 2020; 6:00 pm, P12N | | at No. 17 Oregon State | L 61–75 | 13–15 (5–12) | Gill Coliseum (5,482); Corvallis, OR |
| Mar 1, 2020; 12:00 pm, P12N | | at No. 3 Oregon | L 56–92 | 13–16 (5–13) | Matthew Knight Arena (12,364); Eugene, OR |
Pac-12 Women's Tournament
| Mar 5, 2020; 2:00 pm, P12N | (9) | vs. (8) Utah; First Round | L 63–72 | 13–17 | Mandalay Bay Events Center (3,361); Paradise, NV |
*Non-conference game. ^{#}Rankings from AP Poll. (#) Tournament seedings in parentheses. All times are in Pacific Time.

== Rankings ==
| + Regular season polls | Poll | Pre- season | Week 2 | Week 3 | Week 4 | Week 5 | Week 6 | Week 7 | Week 8 | Week 9 | Week 10 | Week 11 | Week 12 | Week 13 | Week 14 | Week 15 | Week 16 | Week 17 | Week 18 | Week 19 | Final |
| AP | | | | | | | | | | | | | | | | | | | | N/A | |
| Coaches | | | | | | | | | | | | | | | | | | | | | |

Legend
| | Increase in ranking |
| | Decrease in ranking |
| | Not ranked previous week |
| (RV) | Received votes |
| (NR) | Not ranked |

== See also ==
- 2018–19 Washington Huskies men's basketball team
