= 2019–20 Arizona State Sun Devils women's basketball team =

American college basketball season

2019–20 Arizona State Sun Devils women's basketball
- Conference: Pac-12 Conference

Ranking
- AP: No. 25
- Record: 20–11 (10–8 Pac-12)
- Head coach: Charli Turner Thorne (23rd season)
- Assistant coaches: Jackie Moore; Angie Nelp; Nikki Blue
- Home arena: Desert Financial Arena

2019–20 Pac-12 Conference women's basketball standings
	Conf.				Overall
Team	W		L	PCT	W		L	PCT
No. 2 Oregon†	17	–	1	.944	31	–	2	.939
No. 10 UCLA	14	–	4	.778	26	–	5	.839
No. 7 Stanford	14	–	4	.778	27	–	6	.818
No. 13 Arizona	12	–	6	.667	24	–	7	.774
No. 14 Oregon State	10	–	8	.556	23	–	9	.719
No. 25 Arizona State	10	–	8	.556	20	–	11	.645
USC	8	–	10	.444	17	–	14	.548
Utah	6	–	12	.333	14	–	17	.452
Colorado	5	–	13	.278	16	–	14	.533
Washington	5	–	13	.278	13	–	17	.433
Washington State	4	–	14	.222	11	–	20	.355
California	3	–	15	.167	12	–	19	.387
† 2020 Pac-12 Tournament winner Rankings from AP poll

The 2019–20 Arizona State Sun Devils women's basketball team represented Arizona State University during the 2019–20 NCAA Division I women's basketball season. The Sun Devils, led by twenty third year head coach Charli Turner Thorne, played their games at Desert Financial Arena and were members of the Pac-12 Conference.

== Roster ==
2019–20 Arizona State Sun Devils women's basketball team
Players
Coaches

Pos.	#	Name	Height	Year	Previous school	Hometown
G	0	Taya Hanson	5 ft 10 in (1.78 m)	So	Kelowna	Kelowna, BC
G	1	Reili Richardson	5 ft 11 in (1.8 m)	Sr	Brea Olinda	Brea, CA
G	3	Sara Bejedi	5 ft 7 in (1.7 m)	Fr	Mäkelänrinteen lukio	Espoo, Finland
G	4	Kiara Russell	5 ft 8 in (1.73 m)	Sr	Osseo	Minneapolis, MN
G	5	Jamie Loera	5 ft 9 in (1.75 m)	So	Moses Lake	Moses Lake, WA
G	11	Robbi Ryan	5 ft 9 in (1.75 m)	Sr	Sheridan	Sheridan, WY
G	21	Sydnei Caldwell	5 ft 9 in (1.75 m)	Fr	Saddle River Day	Franklin Lakes, NJ
G	22	Eboni Walker	5 ft 11 in (1.8 m)	Fr	Centennial	Las Vegas, NV
G/F	23	Iris Mbulito	6 ft 1 in (1.85 m)	So	IES Castilian poet Tomás Morales	Las Palmas de Gran Canaria, Spain
G/F	24	Bre’yanna Sanders	6 ft 0 in (1.83 m)	Jr	Clovis West	Fresno, CA
F	32	Jayde Van Hyfte	6 ft 1 in (1.85 m)	So	Annawan	Annawan, IL
F	33	Ja'Tavia Tapley	6 ft 4 in (1.93 m)	Sr	University Christian; USC	Jacksonville, FL
F	52	Jamie Ruden	6 ft 2 in (1.88 m)	Sr	John Marshall	Rochester, MN

Head coach

- Charli Turner Thorne (Stanford)

Assistant coach(es)

- Jackie Moore (Armstrong State)
- Angie Nelp (Colorado State)
- Nikki Blue (UCLA)

Legend

- (C) Team captain
- (S) Suspended
- (I) Ineligible
- (W) Walk-on
- Injured
- Current redshirt

Roster

== Schedule ==
Date time, TV	Rank^{#}	Opponent^{#}	Result	Record	Site (attendance) city, state
Non-conference regular season
Nov 5, 2019*; 6:00 pm	No. 20	Air Force	W 87–56	1–0	Desert Financial Arena (1,879); Tempe, AZ
Nov 10, 2019*; 5:00 pm	No. 20	Army	W 83–51	2–0	Desert Financial Arena (2,451); Tempe, AZ
Nov 17, 2019*; 2:00 pm, BTN	No. 19	at Minnesota	L 66–80	2–1	Williams Arena (4,682); Minneapolis, MN
Nov 24, 2019*; 5:00 pm		Cal Poly	W 66–41	3–1	Desert Financial Arena (2,207); Tempe, AZ
Nov 29, 2019*; 3:00 pm		vs. Maine; Gulf Coast Showcase Quarterfinals	W 57–31	4–1	Hertz Arena (573); Fort Myers, FL
Nov 30, 2019*; 5:30 pm		vs. Purdue; Gulf Coast Showcase semifinals	L 52–59	4–2	Hertz Arena (389); Fort Myers, FL
Dec 1, 2019*; 3:00 pm		vs. Middle Tennessee; Gulf Coast Showcase 3rd place game	W 61–60	5–2	Hertz Arena (411); Fort Myers, FL
Dec 6, 2019*; 6:00 pm		BYU	W 60–52	6–2	Desert Financial Arena (2,373); Tempe, AZ
Dec 8, 2019*; 2:00 pm		Idaho State	W 74–69 ^{OT}	7–2	Desert Financial Arena (2,090); Tempe, AZ
Dec 14, 2019*; 2:00 pm, P12N		New Mexico	W 84–47	8–2	Desert Financial Arena (2,037); Tempe, AZ
Dec 18, 2019*; 11:00 am, FSAZ/FCSP		at New Mexico State	W 70–47	9–2	Pan American Center (1,685); Las Cruces, NM
Dec 20, 2019*; 2:00 pm		Creighton	W 70–55	10–2	Desert Financial Arena (2,002); Tempe, AZ
Pac-12 regular season
Dec 29, 2019; 12:00 pm, P12N		No. 18 Arizona	L 53–58	10–3 (0–1)	Desert Financial Arena (4,009); Tempe, AZ
Jan 3, 2020; 8:00 pm, P12N		at No. 10 UCLA	L 66–68	10–4 (0–2)	Pauley Pavilion (1,582); Los Angeles, CA
Jan 5, 2020; 3:00 pm, P12N		at USC	W 63–54	11–4 (1–2)	Galen Center (412); Los Angeles, CA
Jan 10, 2020; 6:00 pm, P12N		No. 2 Oregon	W 72–66	12–4 (2–2)	Desert Financial Arena (3,958); Tempe, AZ
Jan 12, 2020; 2:00 pm, P12N		No. 3 Oregon State	W 55–47	13–4 (3–2)	Desert Financial Arena (2,491); Tempe, AZ
Jan 17, 2020; 8:00 pm, P12N	No. 18	at Washington	W 67–50	14–4 (4–2)	Alaska Airlines Arena (1,579); Seattle, WA
Jan 19, 2020; 1:00 pm, P12N	No. 18	at Washington State	W 65–56	15–4 (5–2)	Beasley Coliseum (808); Pullman, WA
Jan 24, 2020; 6:00 pm, P12N	No. 16	at No. 18 Arizona	L 53–59	15–5 (5–3)	McKale Center (10,160); Tucson, AZ
Jan 31, 2020; 11:00 am, P12N	No. 19	USC	W 76–75 ^{3OT}	16–5 (6–3)	Desert Financial Arena (7,111); Tempe, AZ
Feb 2, 2020; 12:00 pm, P12N	No. 19	No. 8 UCLA	L 61–70	16–6 (6–4)	Desert Financial Arena (2,664); Tempe, AZ
Feb 7, 2020; 9:00 pm, P12N	No. 19	at No. 9 Oregon State	L 62–64	16–7 (6–5)	Gill Coliseum (5,373); Corvallis, OR
Feb 9, 2020; 3:00 pm, P12N	No. 19	at No. 3 Oregon	L 48–79	16–8 (6–6)	Matthew Knight Arena (12,364); Eugene, OR
Feb 14, 2020; 7:00 pm, P12N	No. 22	Washington State	W 62–59	17–8 (7–6)	Desert Financial Arena (2,742); Tempe, AZ
Feb 16, 2020; 12:00 pm, P12N	No. 22	Washington	W 72–68	18–8 (8–6)	Desert Financial Arena (2,645); Tempe, AZ
Feb 21, 2020; 7:00 pm, P12N	No. 21	at Colorado	W 65–59	19–8 (9–6)	CU Events Center (2,135); Boulder, CO
Feb 23, 2020; 12:00 pm, P12N	No. 21	at Utah	L 71–75	19–9 (9–7)	Jon M. Huntsman Center (3,072); Salt Lake City, UT
Feb 28, 2020; 8:00 pm, P12N	No. 24	California	W 77–54	20–9 (10–7)	Desert Financial Arena (4,201); Tempe, AZ
Mar 1, 2020; 12:00 pm, P12N	No. 24	No. 4 Stanford	L 44–55	20–10 (10–8)	Desert Financial Arena (4,928); Tempe, AZ
Pac-12 Women's Tournament
Mar 5, 2020; 12:30 pm, P12N	(5) No. 24	vs. (12) California; First Round	L 67–71	20–11	Mandalay Bay Events Center; Paradise, NV
*Non-conference game. ^{#}Rankings from AP Poll. (#) Tournament seedings in parentheses. All times are in Mountain Time.

== Rankings ==
Ranking movements Legend: ██ Increase in ranking ██ Decrease in ranking — = Not ranked RV = Received votes
	Week																			
Poll	Pre	1	2	3	4	5	6	7	8	9	10	11	12	13	14	15	16	17	18	Final
AP	20	19	RV	RV	—	RV	RV	RV	RV	RV	18	16	19	19	22	21	24	24	25	25
Coaches	18	18^	RV	RV	RV	RV	RV	RV	RV	RV	19	16	20	21	24	24	RV	25	RV	RV

^Coaches' Poll did not release a second poll at the same time as the AP.

== See also ==
2019–20 Arizona State Sun Devils men's basketball team
