= 2019–20 USC Trojans women's basketball team =

Intercollegiate basketball season

2019–20 USC Trojans women's basketball
- Conference: Pac-12 Conference
- Record: 17–14 (8–10 Pac-12)
- Head coach: Mark Trakh (3rd consecutive; 8th overall season)
- Assistant coaches: Jason Glover (3rd season); Aarika Hughes (3rd season); Erin Grant (1st season)
- Home arena: Galen Center

2019–20 Pac-12 Conference women's basketball standings
	Conf.				Overall
Team	W		L	PCT	W		L	PCT
No. 2 Oregon†	17	–	1	.944	31	–	2	.939
No. 10 UCLA	14	–	4	.778	26	–	5	.839
No. 7 Stanford	14	–	4	.778	27	–	6	.818
No. 13 Arizona	12	–	6	.667	24	–	7	.774
No. 14 Oregon State	10	–	8	.556	23	–	9	.719
No. 25 Arizona State	10	–	8	.556	20	–	11	.645
USC	8	–	10	.444	17	–	14	.548
Utah	6	–	12	.333	14	–	17	.452
Colorado	5	–	13	.278	16	–	14	.533
Washington	5	–	13	.278	13	–	17	.433
Washington State	4	–	14	.222	11	–	20	.355
California	3	–	15	.167	12	–	19	.387
† 2020 Pac-12 Tournament winner Rankings from AP poll

The 2019–20 USC Trojans Women's Basketball team represented the University of Southern California during the 2019–20 NCAA Division I women's basketball season. The Trojans played their home games at the Galen Center and were members of the Pac-12 Conference. The squad was led by head coach Mark Trakh, who was in his 3rd year of his 2nd stint (8th year overall) with the Women of Troy. The season ended abruptly after the Pac-12 Tournament due to the COVID-19 pandemic. The team was expected to participate in the WNIT, but it was canceled.

== Roster ==
2019–20 USC Trojans women's basketball team
Players
Coaches

Pos.	#	Name	Height	Year	Previous school	Hometown
G	0	Shalexxus Aaron (C) (redshirt)	6 ft 1 in (1.85 m)	RS So	Martin Luther King HS	Apple Valley, CA
F	1	Kayla Overbeck (C)	6 ft 1 in (1.85 m)	Sr	Vanderbilt	Newbury Park, CA
G	4	Endyia Rogers	5 ft 7 in (1.7 m)	Fr	Bishop Lynch HS	Dallas, TX
G	5	Stephanie Watts	5 ft 11 in (1.8 m)	GS	North Carolina	Wesley Chapel, NC
G	11	Aliyah Jeune	6 ft 1 in (1.85 m)	GS	Morehead State	Westampton, NJ
C	15	Angel Jackson	6 ft 5 in (1.96 m)	Fr	Salesian HS	Richmond, CA
G	22	Kyra White	6 ft 5 in (1.96 m)	Fr	Converse Judson HS	Converse, TX
G	23	Madison Campbell (redshirt)	5 ft 11 in (1.8 m)	Fr	Clovis West HS	Fresno, CA
G	24	Desiree Caldwell (C)	5 ft 8 in (1.73 m)	So	Byron P. Steel II HS	San Antonio, TX
G	25	Alyson Miura	5 ft 8 in (1.73 m)	Fr	La Salle Prep	Clackamas, OR
G	30	India Otto (W)	5 ft 9 in (1.75 m)	Fr	Windward HS	Los Angeles, CA
F	35	Alissa Pili	6 ft 0 in (1.83 m)	Fr	Dimond HS	Anchorage, AK

Head coach

- Mark Trakh (Long Beach State)

Assistant coach(es)

- Jason Glover (Grand Canyon)
- Aarika Hughes (USC)
- Erin Grant (Texas Tech)

Legend

- (C) Team captain
- (S) Suspended
- (I) Ineligible
- (W) Walk-on
- Injured
- Current redshirt

Roster
Last update: November 10, 2019

== Schedule ==
Date time, TV	Rank^{#}	Opponent^{#}	Result	Record	Site (attendance) city, state
Non-conference regular season
11/05/2019*; 7:00 pm		at CSUN	W 69–53	1–0	Matadome (888); Northridge, CA
11/09/2019*; 2:00 pm		Virginia	W 59–49	2–0	Galen Center (1,362); Los Angeles, CA
11/14/2019*; 7:00 pm		at UC Riverside	W 76–59	3–0	SRC Arena (405); Riverside, CA
11/18/2019*; 7:00 pm		at UC Santa Barbara	L 46–57	3–1	The Thunderdome (407); Santa Barbara, CA
11/23/2019*; 5:30 pm		No. 6 Texas A&M	L 64–74	3–2	Galen Center (682); Los Angeles, CA
11/29/2019*; 5:45 pm		vs. Nebraska; South Point Shootout	L 54–67	3–3	South Point Arena (300); Enterprise, NV
11/30/2019*; 8:00 pm		vs. Alabama; South Point Shootout	W 60–57	4–3	South Point Arena; Enterprise, NV
12/14/2019*; 2:00 pm		UNLV	W 75–54	5–3	Galen Center (384); Los Angeles, CA
12/18/2019*; 7:00 pm		UT Rio Grande Valley	W 80–43	6–3	Galen Center (212); Los Angeles, CA
12/20/2019*; 6:00 pm		Nevada; Women of Troy Classic	W 50–47	7–3	Galen Center (362); Los Angeles, CA
12/21/2019*; 1:30 pm		Long Beach State; Women of Troy Classic	W 57–40	8–3	Galen Center (1,238); Los Angeles, CA
Pac-12 regular season
12/29/2019; 1:00 pm, P12N		at No. 10 UCLA; Rivalry	L 59–83	8–4 (0–1)	Pauley Pavilion (4,255); Los Angeles, CA
01/03/2020; 7:00 pm, P12N		No. 18 Arizona	L 57–65	8–5 (0–2)	Galen Center (509); Los Angeles, CA
01/05/2020; 2:00 pm, P12N		Arizona State	L 54–63	8–6 (0–3)	Galen Center (412); Los Angeles, CA
01/10/2020; 6:00 pm, P12N		at Colorado	L 53–66	8–7 (0–4)	CU Events Center (1,824); Boulder, CO
01/12/2020; 11:00 am, P12N		at Utah	L 65–67	8–8 (0–5)	Jon M. Huntsman Center (2,383); Salt Lake City, UT
01/17/2020; 7:30 pm, P12N		No. 7 UCLA; Rivalry	W 70–68 ^{2OT}	9–8 (1–5)	Galen Center (1,527); Los Angeles, CA
01/24/2020; 7:00 pm, P12N		Washington State	W 74–63	10–8 (2–5)	Galen Center (467); Los Angeles, CA
01/26/2020; 12:00 pm, P12N		Washington	W 81–78 ^{OT}	11–8 (3–5)	Galen Center (1,267); Los Angeles, CA
01/31/2020; 10:00 am, P12N		at No. 19 Arizona State	L 75–76 ^{3OT}	11–9 (3–6)	Desert Financial Arena (7,111); Tempe, AZ
02/02/2020; 11:00 am, P12N		at No. 16 Arizona	L 57–73	11–10 (3–7)	McKale Center (5,027); Tucson, AZ
02/07/2020; 7:00 pm, P12N		at California	W 75–67	12–10 (4–7)	Haas Pavilion (1,556); Berkeley, CA
02/09/2020; 12:00 pm, P12N		at No. 6 Stanford	L 59–79	12–11 (4–8)	Maples Pavilion (5,221); Stanford, CA
02/14/2020; 7:00 pm, P12N		No. 11 Oregon State	W 72–66	13–11 (5–8)	Galen Center (476); Los Angeles, CA
02/16/2020; 1:00 pm, P12N		No. 3 Oregon	L 67–93	13–12 (5–9)	Galen Center (2,123); Los Angeles, CA
02/21/2020; 7:00 pm, P12N		at Washington	L 66–75	13–13 (5–10)	Alaska Airlines Arena (1,677); Seattle, WA
02/23/2020; 11:30 am, P12N		at Washington State	W 66–60	14–13 (6–10)	Beasley Coliseum (1,073); Pullman, WA
02/28/2020; 6:00 pm, P12N		Utah	W 69–66	15–13 (7–10)	Galen Center (511); Los Angeles, CA
03/01/2020; 12:00 pm, P12N		Colorado	W 66–55	16–13 (8–10)	Galen Center (4,227); Los Angeles, CA
Pac-12 Women's Tournament
03/05/2020; 6:00 pm, P12N	(7)	vs. (10) Colorado; First Round	W 69–54	17–13	Mandalay Bay Events Center; Paradise, NV
03/06/2020; 6:00 pm, P12N	(7)	vs. (2) No. 8 UCLA; Quarterfinals	L 66–73	17–14	Mandalay Bay Events Center; Paradise, NV
*Non-conference game. ^{#}Rankings from AP Poll. (#) Tournament seedings in parentheses. All times are in Pacific Time.

== Rankings ==
2019–20 NCAA Division I women's basketball rankings

Regular season polls
Poll	Pre- Season	Week 2	Week 3	Week 4	Week 5	Week 6	Week 7	Week 8	Week 9	Week 10	Week 11	Week 12	Week 13	Week 14	Week 15	Week 16	Week 17	Week 18	Week 19	Final
AP	NR	NR	NR	NR	NR	NR	NR	NR	NR	NR	NR	NR	NR	NR	NR	NR	NR	NR	NR	NR
Coaches	NR	NR	NR	NR	NR	NR	NR	NR	NR	NR	NR	NR	NR	NR	NR	NR	NR	NR	NR	NR

Legend
	Increase in ranking
	Decrease in ranking
	Not ranked previous week
(RV)	Received Votes
(NR)	Not Ranked
