= 2019–20 Oregon State Beavers women's basketball team =

Intercollegiate basketball season

2019–20 Oregon State Beavers women's basketball

Preseason WNIT champions
- Conference: Pac-12 Conference

Ranking
- Coaches: No. 16
- AP: No. 14
- Record: 23–9 (10–8 Pac-12)
- Head coach: Scott Rueck (10th season)
- Associate head coach: Jonas Chatterton
- Assistant coaches: Brian Holsinger; Katie Baker
- Home arena: Gill Coliseum

2019–20 Pac-12 Conference women's basketball standings
	Conf.				Overall
Team	W		L	PCT	W		L	PCT
No. 2 Oregon†	17	–	1	.944	31	–	2	.939
No. 10 UCLA	14	–	4	.778	26	–	5	.839
No. 7 Stanford	14	–	4	.778	27	–	6	.818
No. 13 Arizona	12	–	6	.667	24	–	7	.774
No. 14 Oregon State	10	–	8	.556	23	–	9	.719
No. 25 Arizona State	10	–	8	.556	20	–	11	.645
USC	8	–	10	.444	17	–	14	.548
Utah	6	–	12	.333	14	–	17	.452
Colorado	5	–	13	.278	16	–	14	.533
Washington	5	–	13	.278	13	–	17	.433
Washington State	4	–	14	.222	11	–	20	.355
California	3	–	15	.167	12	–	19	.387
† 2020 Pac-12 Tournament winner Rankings from AP poll

The 2019–20 Oregon State Beavers women's basketball team represented Oregon State University during the 2019–20 NCAA Division I women's basketball season. The Beavers, led by tenth-year head coach Scott Rueck, played their games at the Gill Coliseum and were members of the Pac-12 Conference.

== Roster ==
2019–20 Oregon State Beavers women's basketball team
Players
Coaches

Pos.	#	Name	Height	Year	Previous school	Hometown
G	0	Mikayla Pivec	5 ft 10 in (1.78 m)	Sr	Lynnwood HS	Lynnwood, WA
G	1	Aleah Goodman	5 ft 9 in (1.75 m)	Jr	La Salle HS	Milwaukie, OR
F	2	Andrea Aquino	6 ft 9 in (2.06 m)	RS Fr	Ribet Academy	Caacupé, Paraguay
G/F	3	Madison Washington	6 ft 1 in (1.85 m)	Sr	Bishop Gorman HS	Las Vegas, NV
G	4	Noelle Mannen	5 ft 6 in (1.68 m)	RS Fr	Valley Catholic	North Plains, OR
F	5	Taya Corosdale	6 ft 3 in (1.91 m)	Jr	Bothell HS	Bothell, WA
F/C	12	Jelena Mitrović	6 ft 9 in (2.06 m)	Fr	–	Novi Sad, Serbia
F	13	Janessa Thropay	6 ft 2 in (1.88 m)	Sr	Chino HS	Chino, CA
G	22	Kat Tudor	6 ft 0 in (1.83 m)	Sr	St. Mary's HS	Stockton, CA
G	24	Destiny Slocum	5 ft 7 in (1.7 m)	RS Jr	Mountain View HS; Maryland	Meridian, ID
F	32	Patricia Morris	6 ft 7 in (2.01 m)	So	Duarte HS	Duarte, CA
F	42	Kennedy Brown	6 ft 6 in (1.98 m)	Fr	Derby High School	Derby, KS
G	43	Jasmine Simmons	5 ft 11 in (1.8 m)	So	Australian Institute of Sport	Mildura, Australia
F	44	Taylor Jones	6 ft 4 in (1.93 m)	Fr	Dallas Christian	Forney, TX

Head coach

- Scott Rueck (Oregon State)

Assistant coach(es)

- Jonas Chatterton (Utah)
- Brian Holsinger (Western Washington)
- Katie Baker (Montana)

Legend

- (C) Team captain
- (S) Suspended
- (I) Ineligible
- (W) Walk-on
- Injured
- Current redshirt

Roster
Last update: July 23, 2024

== Schedule ==
Date time, TV	Rank^{#}	Opponent^{#}	Result	Record	Site (attendance) city, state
Exhibition
October 27, 2019*; 2:00 p.m.	No. 7	Union (TN)	W 95–41		Gill Coliseum; Corvallis, OR
November 1, 2019*; 6:00 p.m.	No. 7	Concordia (OR)	W 106–45		Gill Coliseum; Corvallis, OR
November 4, 2019*; 7:00 p.m., P12N	No. 7	USA Basketball	L 58–81		Gill Coliseum; Corvallis, OR
Non-conference regular season
November 9, 2019*; 6:00 p.m., P12N	No. 7	UC Irvine; Preseason WNIT first round	W 86–57	1–0	Gill Coliseum (5,404); Corvallis, OR
November 11, 2019*; 7:00 p.m.	No. 7	Pacific; Preseason WNIT second round	W 69–57	2–0	Gill Coliseum (4,202); Corvallis, OR
November 14, 2019*; 7:00 p.m.	No. 7	No. 18 DePaul; Preseason WNIT semifinals	W 98–77	3–0	Gill Coliseum (4,430); Corvallis, OR
November 17, 2019*; 1:30 p.m., CBSSN	No. 7	Missouri State; Preseason WNIT championship	W 80–69	4–0	Gill Coliseum (4,872); Corvallis, OR
November 21, 2019*; 11:00 a.m.	No. 7	Southern Utah	W 95–45	5–0	Gill Coliseum (9,301); Corvallis, OR
November 29, 2019*; 11:00 a.m.	No. 7	at No. 19 Miami (FL); Miami Thanksgiving Classic	W 75–53	6–0	Watsco Center (1,336); Coral Gables, FL
November 30, 2019*; 11:00 a.m.	No. 7	vs. Liberty; Miami Thanksgiving Classic	W 68–55	7–0	Watsco Center (652); Coral Gables, FL
December 6, 2019*; 7:00 p.m.	No. 5	Hawaii	W 64–32	8–0	Gill Coliseum (4,784); Corvallis, OR
December 14, 2019; 7:30 p.m., P12N	No. 4	Utah State	W 75–46	9–0	Gill Coliseum (5,038); Corvallis, OR
December 18, 2019*; 9:30 p.m.	No. 4	vs. Northern Arizona; Maui Jim Maui Classic	W 91–57	10–0	Lahaina Civic Center (832); Lahaina, HI
December 19, 2019*; 9:30 p.m.	No. 4	vs. BYU; Maui Jim Maui Classic	W 65–34	11–0	Lahaina Civic Center (711); Lahaina, HI
December 29, 2019*; 12:00 p.m.	No. 3	Cal State Bakersfield	W 69–50	12–0	Gill Coliseum (5,534); Corvallis, OR
Pac-12 regular season
January 3, 2020; 7:00 p.m., P12N	No. 3	Utah	W 77–48	13–0 (1–0)	Gill Coliseum (5,629); Corvallis, OR
January 5, 2020; 12:00 p.m., P12N	No. 3	Colorado	W 72–60	14–0 (2–0)	Gill Coliseum (5,320); Corvallis, OR
January 10, 2020; 7:00 p.m., P12N	No. 3	at No. 18 Arizona	W 63–61	15–0 (3–0)	McKale Center (5,694); Tucson, AZ
January 12, 2020; 1:00 p.m., P12N	No. 3	at Arizona State	L 47–55	15–1 (3–1)	Desert Financial Arena (2,491); Tempe, AZ
January 17, 2020; 7:00 p.m., P12N	No. 8	California	W 81–44	16–1 (4–1)	Gill Coliseum (5,579); Corvallis, OR
January 19, 2020; 12:00 p.m., P12N	No. 8	No. 3 Stanford	L 58–61	16–2 (4–2)	Gill Coliseum (8,667); Corvallis, OR
January 24, 2020; 7:00 p.m., P12N	No. 7	at No. 4 Oregon; Civil War	L 64–76	16–3 (4–3)	Matthew Knight Arena (12,364); Eugene, OR
January 26, 2020; 1:00 p.m., ESPNews	No. 7	No. 4 Oregon; Civil War	L 57–66	16–4 (4–4)	Gill Coliseum (9,301); Corvallis, OR
January 30, 2020; 5:00 p.m., P12N	No. 10	at Colorado	W 79–52	17–4 (5–4)	CU Events Center (1,900); Boulder, CO
February 1, 2020; 11:00 a.m., P12N	No. 10	at Utah	W 77–65	18–4 (6–4)	Jon M. Huntsman Center (3,298); Salt Lake City, UT
February 7, 2020; 8:00 p.m., P12N	No. 9	No. 19 Arizona State	W 64–62	19–4 (7–4)	Gill Coliseum (5,373); Corvallis, OR
02/9, 2020; 12:00 p.m., P12N	No. 9	No. 12 Arizona	L 58–65 ^{OT}	19–5 (7–5)	Gill Coliseum (5,682); Corvallis, OR
February 14, 2020; 7:00 p.m., P12N	No. 11	at USC	L 66–72	19–6 (7–6)	Galen Center (476); Los Angeles, CA
February 17, 2020; 6:00 p.m., ESPN2	No. 15	at No. 8 UCLA	L 74–83 ^{OT}	19–7 (7–7)	Pauley Pavilion (5,994); Los Angeles, CA
February 21, 2020; 8:00 p.m., P12N	No. 15	at No. 4 Stanford	L 60–63	19–8 (7–8)	Maples Pavilion (3,745); Stanford, CA
February 23, 2020; 2:00 p.m., P12N	No. 15	at California	W 76–63	20–8 (8–8)	Haas Pavilion (2,486); Berkeley, CA
February 28, 2020; 6:00 p.m., P12N	No. 17	Washington	W 75–61	21–8 (9–8)	Gill Coliseum (5,482); Corvallis, OR
March 1, 2020; 12:00 p.m., P12N	No. 17	Washington State	W 73–58	22–8 (10–8)	Gill Coliseum (5,739); Corvallis, OR
Pac-12 women's tournament
March 5, 2020; 8:30 p.m., P12N	(6) No. 14	vs. (11) Washington State; First round	W 82–55	23–8	Mandalay Bay Events Center (4,387); Paradise, NV
March 6, 2020; 8:30 p.m., P12N	(6) No. 14	vs. (3) No. 7 Stanford; Quarterfinals	L 57–68	23–9	Mandalay Bay Events Center (5,548); Paradise, NV
*Non-conference game. ^{#}Rankings from AP poll. (#) Tournament seedings in parentheses. All times are in Pacific.

== Rankings ==
Regular-season polls
Poll	Pre- season	Week 2	Week 3	Week 4	Week 5	Week 6	Week 7	Week 8	Week 9	Week 10	Week 11	Week 12	Week 13	Week 14	Week 15	Week 16	Week 17	Week 18	Week 19	Final
AP	7	7	7	7	5	4 (1)	4 (1)	3 (4)	3 (5)	3 (3)	8	7	10	9	11	15	17	14	14	14
Coaches	6	6^	5	5	5	4	4 (1)	3 (1)	3 (4)	3 (3)	7 (1)	7	10	9	11	14	18	15	16	16

Legend
	Increase in ranking
	Decrease in ranking
	Not ranked previous week
RV	Received votes
NR	Not ranked
( )	First-place votes received

^Coaches did not release a week 2 poll.

== See also ==
- 2019–20 Oregon State Beavers men's basketball team
