= 2019–20 Washington State Cougars women's basketball team =

Intercollegiate basketball season

2019–20 Washington State Cougars women's basketball
- Conference: Pac-12 Conference
- Record: 11–20 (4–14 Pac-12)
- Head coach: Kamie Ethridge (2nd season)
- Assistant coaches: Laurie Koehn; Jason Chainey; Camille Williams
- Home arena: Beasley Coliseum

2019–20 Pac-12 Conference women's basketball standings
	Conf.				Overall
Team	W		L	PCT	W		L	PCT
No. 2 Oregon†	17	–	1	.944	31	–	2	.939
No. 10 UCLA	14	–	4	.778	26	–	5	.839
No. 7 Stanford	14	–	4	.778	27	–	6	.818
No. 13 Arizona	12	–	6	.667	24	–	7	.774
No. 14 Oregon State	10	–	8	.556	23	–	9	.719
No. 25 Arizona State	10	–	8	.556	20	–	11	.645
USC	8	–	10	.444	17	–	14	.548
Utah	6	–	12	.333	14	–	17	.452
Colorado	5	–	13	.278	16	–	14	.533
Washington	5	–	13	.278	13	–	17	.433
Washington State	4	–	14	.222	11	–	20	.355
California	3	–	15	.167	12	–	19	.387
† 2020 Pac-12 Tournament winner Rankings from AP poll

The 2019–20 Washington State Cougars women's basketball team represent Washington State University during the 2019–20 NCAA Division I women's basketball season. The Cougars, led by second-year head coach Kamie Ethridge, played their home games at the Beasley Coliseum and were members of the Pac-12 Conference.

== Previous season ==
The 2018–2019 edition of the WSU Cougars women's basketball team finished with a record of nine wins and 21 losses. The Cougars finished Pac-12 Conference play with a record of four wins and 14 losses. This resulted in a 10th-place finish in the regular season conference standings. In the 2019 Pac-12 Conference women's basketball tournament, the Cougars were defeated by the Cal Bears in the tournament's first round.

== Roster ==
2019–20 Washington State Cougars women's basketball team
Players
Coaches

Pos.	#	Name	Height	Year	Previous school	Hometown
G	0	Leah Mafua	5 ft 10 in (1.78 m)	Fr	Hutt Valley HS	Wellington, New Zealand
G	2	Michaela Jones	5 ft 10 in (1.78 m)	So	Beatrice HS	Wymore, NE
G	3	Emma Nankervis	6 ft 3 in (1.91 m)	Fr	N/A	Mount, Eliza, Australia
G	4	Krystal Leger-Walker	5 ft 9 in (1.75 m)	Fr	N/A	Waikato, New Zealand
G	10	Johanna Muzet	6 ft 0 in (1.83 m)	RS Jr	N/A	Lyon, France
G	11	Chanelle Molina	5 ft 9 in (1.75 m)	Sr	Konawaena HS	Kailua, HI
F	13	Shir Levy	5 ft 11 in (1.8 m)	So	Gymnasia Realit	Ness Ziona, Israel
F	15	Ula Motuga	6 ft 1 in (1.85 m)	So	Caterbury College	Logan, Australia
G	20	Grace Sarver	5 ft 8 in (1.73 m)	Fr	West Seattle HS	Seattle, WA
G	22	Celena Molina	5 ft 9 in (1.75 m)	RS So	Konawaena HS	Kailua, HI
G	33	Cherliyn Molina	5 ft 6 in (1.68 m)	So	Konawaena HS	Kailua, HI
F	41	Jovana Subasic	6 ft 1 in (1.85 m)	RS Jr	N/A	Šabac, Serbia
F	45	Borislava Hristova	6 ft 0 in (1.83 m)	RS Sr	Georgi Benkovski	Varna, Bulgaria
C	55	Bella Murekatete	6 ft 5 in (1.96 m)	Fr	Genesis Prep Academy	Ngoma Huye, Nigeria

Head coach

- Kamie Ethridge (Texas)

Assistant coach(es)

- Laurie Koehn (Kansas State)
- Jason Chainey (Yeronga Institute of TAFE)
- Camille Williams (Wisconsin)

Legend

- (C) Team captain
- (S) Suspended
- (I) Ineligible
- (W) Walk-on
- Injured
- Current redshirt

Roster
Last update: 08/16/2019

== Schedule ==
Date time, TV	Rank^{#}	Opponent^{#}	Result	Record	Site (attendance) city, state
Exhibition
10/31/2019*; 5:30 p.m.		Beijing Normal	W 71–63		Beasley Coliseum; Pullman, WA
Non-conference regular season
11/05/2019*; 7:00 p.m.		Pepperdine	W 85–48	1–0	Beasley Coliseum (612); Pullman, WA
11/09/2019*; 1:00 p.m.		BYU	W 67–50	2–0	Beasley Coliseum (717); Pullman, WA
11/20/2019*; 4:00 p.m.		at Boise State	W 86–60	3–0	ExtraMile Arena (1,257); Boise, ID
11/24/2019*; 12:00 p.m.		Cal State Northridge	W 71–61	4–0	Beasley Coliseum (493); Pullman, WA
11/28/2019*; 2:45 p.m.		vs. No. 2 Baylor; Paradise Jam tournament Reef Division	L 66–89	4–1	Sports and Fitness Center; St. Thomas, V.I.
11/29/2019*; 6:00 p.m.		vs. No. 5 South Carolina; Paradise Jam Tournament Reef Division	L 53–68	4–2	Sports and Fitness Center (1,806); St. Thomas, VI
11/30/2019*; 2:45 p.m.		vs. No. 18 Indiana; Paradise Jam Tournament Reef Division	L 44–78	4–3	Sports and Fitness Center; St. Thomas, VI
12/04/2019*; 7:00 p.m.		Arkansas–Pine Bluff	W 85–56	5–3	Beasley Coliseum (425); Pullman, WA
12/08/2019*; 2:00 p.m.		No. 18 Gonzaga	L 53–76	5–4	Beasley Coliseum (1,332); Pullman, WA
12/15/2019*; 4:30 p.m., P12N		UC Irvine	W 87–59	6–4	Beasley Coliseum (472); Pullman, WA
12/20/2019*; 9:00 a.m.		vs. Southern; Miami Holiday Classic semifinals	W 69–54	7–4	Watsco Center (733); Coral Gables, FL
12/21/2019*; 8:00 a.m., ACCNX		at No. 16 Miami (FL); Miami Holiday Classic championship	L 68–74	7–5	Watsco Center (782); Coral Gables, FL
Pac-12 regular season
12/29/2019; 2:00 p.m., P12N		Washington	L 56–65	7–6 (0–1)	Beasley Coliseum (503); Pullman, WA
01/03/2020; 7:00 p.m., P12N		at No. 5 Stanford	L 58–77	7–7 (0–2)	Maples Pavilion (2,643); Stanford, CA
01/05/2020; 12:00 p.m., P12N		at California	W 96–75	8–7 (1–2)	Haas Pavilion (1,318); Berkeley, CA
01/11/2020; 12:30 p.m., P12N		at Washington	W 66–59	9–7 (2–2)	Alaska Airlines Arena (2,374); Seattle, WA
01/17/2020; 7:00 p.m., P12N		No. 21 Arizona	L 67–74	9–8 (2–3)	Beasley Coliseum (704); Pullman, WA
01/19/2020; 12:00 p.m., P12N		No. 18 Arizona State	L 56–65	9–9 (2–4)	Beasley Coliseum (808); Pullman, WA
01/24/2020; 7:00 p.m., P12N		at USC	L 63–74	9–10 (2–5)	Galen Center (467); Los Angeles, CA
01/26/2020; 12:00 p.m., P12N		at UCLA	L 50–66	9–11 (2–6)	Pauley Pavilion (2,501); Los Angeles, CA
01/31/2020; 7:00 p.m., P12N		California	W 92–66	10–11 (3–6)	Beasley Coliseum (1,024); Pullman, WA
02/02/2020; 12:00 p.m., P12N		No. 6 Stanford	L 49–71	10–12 (3–7)	Beasley Coliseum (709); Pullman, WA
02/07/2020; 7:00 p.m., P12N		Colorado	W 69–59	11–12 (4–7)	Beasley Coliseum (747); Pullman, WA
02/09/2020; 12:00 p.m., P12N		Utah	L 66–78	11–13 (4–8)	Beasley Coliseum (757); Pullman, WA
02/14/2020; 6:00 p.m., P12N		at No. 22 Arizona State	L 59–62	11–14 (4–9)	Desert Financial Arena (2,742); Tucson, AZ
02/16/2020; 11:00 a.m., P12N		at No. 12 Arizona	L 57–72	11–15 (4–10)	McKale Center (5,658); Tucson, AZ
02/21/2020; 7:00 p.m., P12N		No. 8 UCLA	L 62–70	11–16 (4–11)	Beasley Coliseum (467); Pullman, WA
02/23/2020; 11:30 a.m., P12N		USC	L 60–66	11–17 (4–12)	Beasley Coliseum (1,073); Pullman, WA
02/28/2020; 8:00 p.m., P12N		at No. 3 Oregon	L 57–88	11–18 (4–13)	Matthew Knight Arena (12,364); Eugene, OR
03/01/2020; 12:00 p.m., P12N		at No. 17 Oregon State	L 58–73	11–19 (4–14)	Gill Coliseum (5,739); Corvallis, OR
Pac-12 Women's tournament
03/05/2020; 8:30 p.m., P12N	(11)	vs. (6) No. 14 Oregon State; First Round	L 55–82	11–20	Mandalay Bay Events Center (4,387); Paradise, NV
*Non-conference game. ^{#}Rankings from AP Poll. (#) Tournament seedings in parentheses. All times are in Pacific Time.

== Rankings ==
- 2019–20 NCAA Division I women's basketball rankings

Regular season polls
Poll	Pre- season	Week 2	Week 3	Week 4	Week 5	Week 6	Week 7	Week 8	Week 9	Week 10	Week 11	Week 12	Week 13	Week 14	Week 15	Week 16	Week 17	Week 18	Week 19	Final
AP																				N/A
Coaches																				

Legend
	Increase in ranking
	Decrease in ranking
	Not ranked previous week
(RV)	Received votes
(NR)	Not ranked

== See also ==
- 2019–20 Washington State Cougars men's basketball team
