= Matthew Knight Arena =

Multi-purpose arena

- MKA

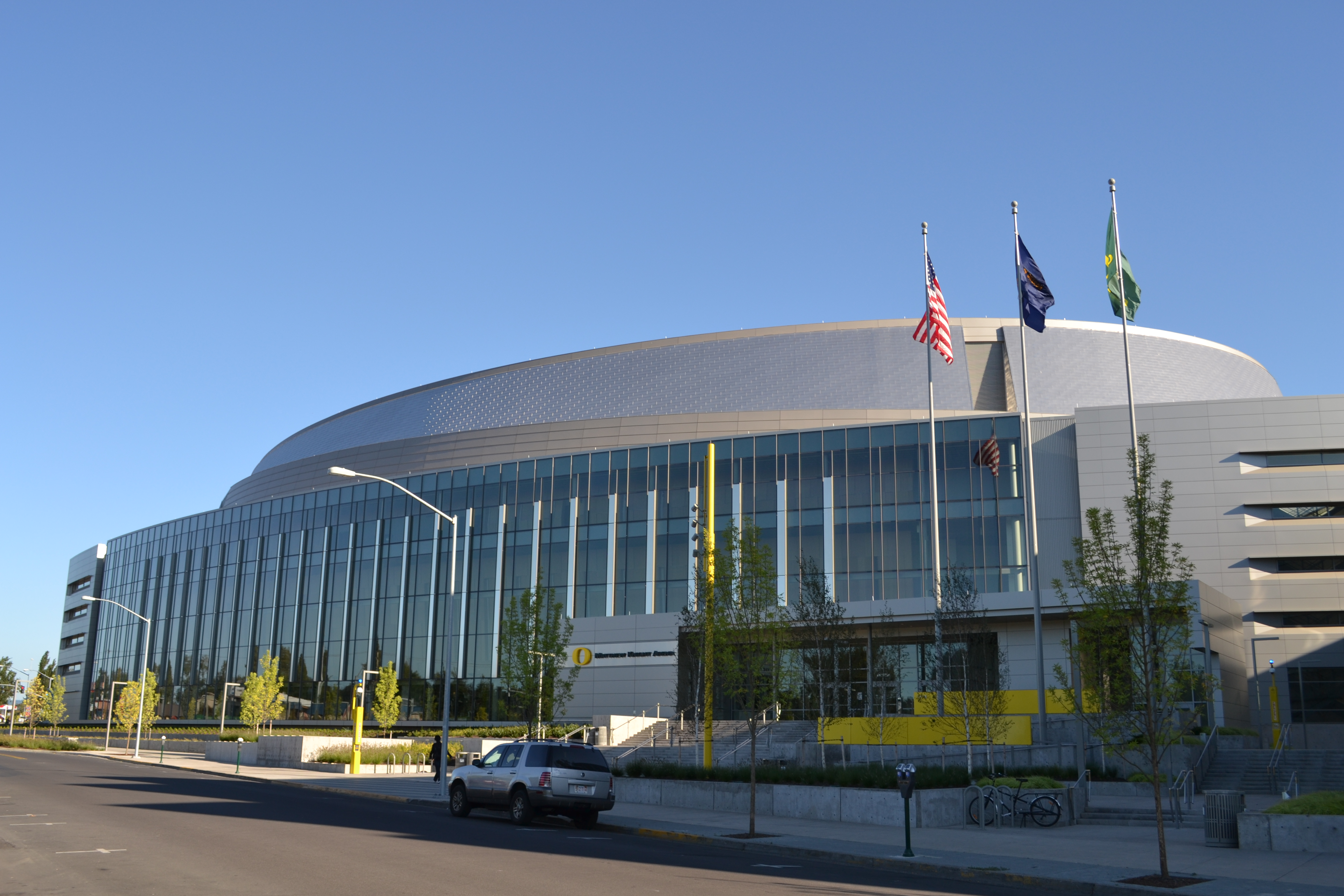
- The exterior of the arena

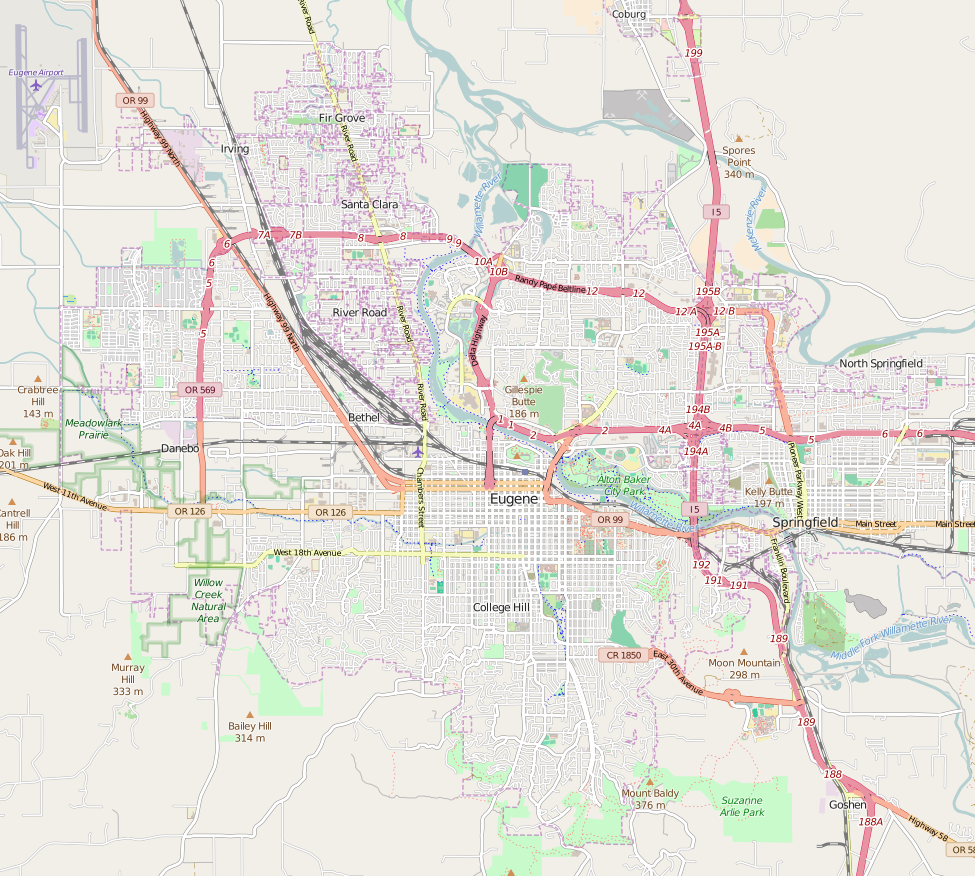
- Location in Eugene Location in Oregon Location in the United States
- Location: 1390 Villard St. Eugene, OR 97401; United States
- Coordinates: 44.045°N 123.066°W
- Owner: National Championship Properties (subsidiary of University of Oregon)
- Operator: Arena Network
- Capacity: 12,364
- Public transit: EmX Agate Station

Construction
- Groundbreaking: February 7, 2009
- Opened: January 13, 2011
- Cost: $227 million ($325 million in 2025 dollars)
- Architects: TVA Architects; Ellerbe Becket
- Structural engineers: Haris Engineering, Inc.
- Services engineer: Henderson Engineers Inc.
- General contractor: Hoffman Construction Company

Tenants
- Oregon men's basketball (NCAA) (2011–present); Oregon women's basketball (NCAA) (2011–present); Oregon women's volleyball (NCAA) (2011–present); Oregon acrobatics & tumbling (NCATA) (2011–present)

The Matthew Knight Arena (MKA) is a 12,364-seat, multi-purpose arena in Eugene, Oregon, United States. It is home of the Oregon Ducks men's & women's basketball teams, along with the volleyball team, replacing McArthur Court. All teams compete in the Big Ten Conference starting with the 2024-25 season after their time as members of the Pac-12 Conference. It is located on the east side of campus at the corner of Franklin Boulevard and Villard Street, a gateway to campus as people arrive from I-5. The arena was originally intended to be ready for the start of the 2010–11 basketball season, but instead opened for the men's basketball game against the USC Trojans on January 13, 2011. It is named for chief donor Phil Knight's son, Matthew Knight, who died aged 34 in a scuba diving accident. The arena cost $227 million and was designed as collaboration between TVA Architects of Portland and Ellerbe Becket of Kansas City, Missouri. Hoffman Construction Company of Portland was the general contractor.

The Ducks inaugurated the arena to a sold-out crowd on January 13, 2011, beating the USC Trojans, 68–62.

== Design ==
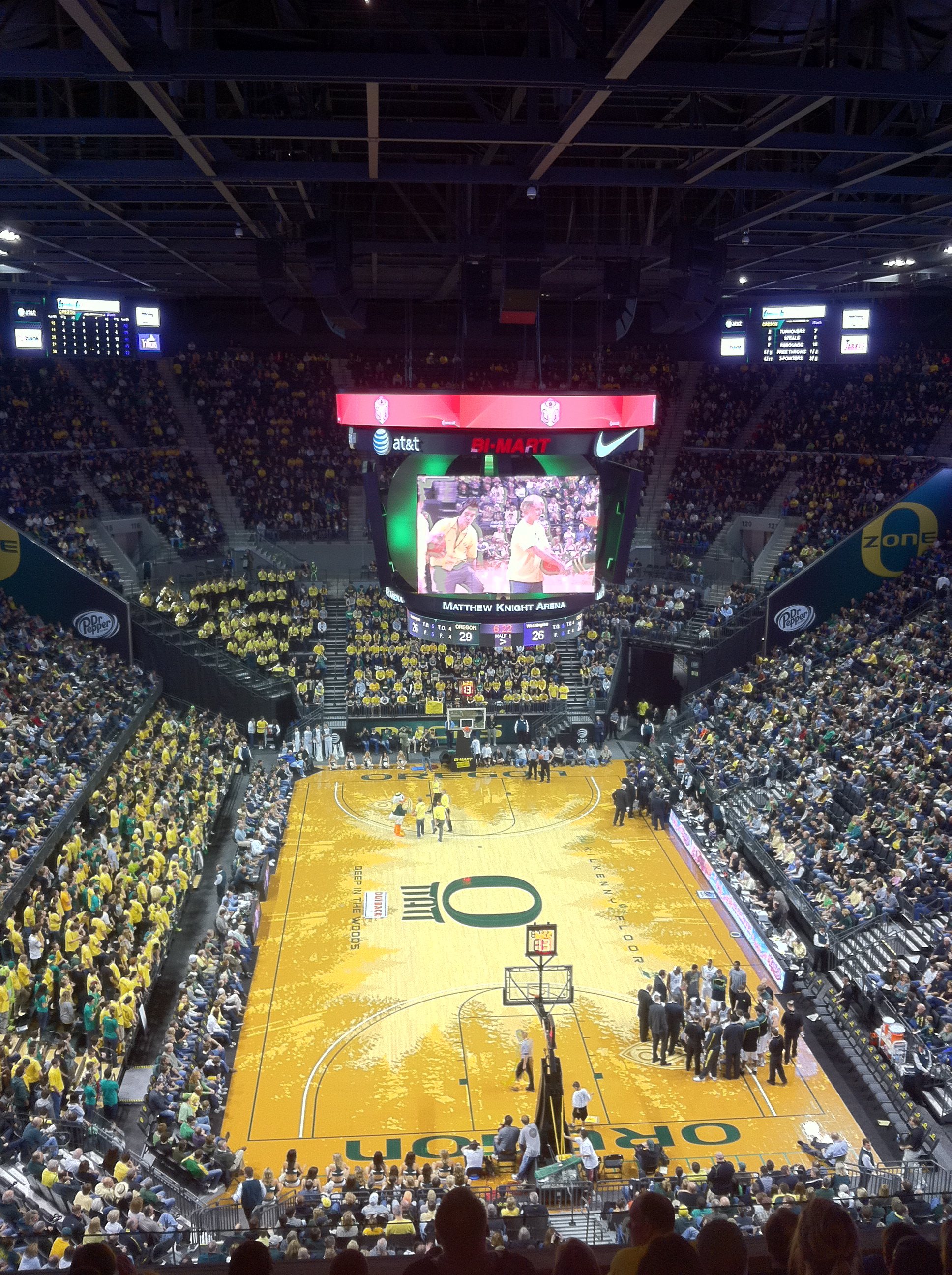
Matthew Knight Arena, February 2011

The arena floor is named Kilkenny Floor after former Oregon Athletic Director Pat Kilkenny. Called "Deep in the Woods", the design features repeating silhouettes of Pacific Northwest tree lines, giving the impression of being lost in the forest, gazing toward the sky. The floor was designed by Tinker Hatfield, Nike's VP of Creative Design, who intended to design an "iconic television presence possible for the University of Oregon" and honor the "Tall Firs", the nickname of the 1938–39 Oregon Ducks men's basketball team, winners of the inaugural NCAA basketball championship.

The arena also features a 32-by-36-foot (9.8 m × 11.0 m), 65,000-pound (29,000 kg) center-hung scoreboard, once the largest in college sports. It contains four 20-by-12-foot (6.1 m × 3.7 m) HD LED monitors and is connected to the ceiling by intersecting "O" logos.

There was some criticism from fans about the glare caused by the court's contrast. There also was criticism for the lack of a visible center court line, though one has since been added.

== Criticism ==
=== Statewide criticism ===
The projected construction cost of $200 million made Knight Arena the most expensive on-campus basketball arena in the United States, and financing was secured through state-backed, 30-year bonds. The university was criticized for overstating the income estimates.

=== Community criticism ===
There was also concern from residents of the Fairmount neighborhood, where the arena is located, about insufficient parking and trash disposal during events. According to spokesman Greg Rikhoff, the university did not originally plan to add any new parking for the 12,500-seat arena. The first proposals included only street parking and a remote park and ride shuttle service for spectators, but later proposals added parking spaces. The university was required to obtain a conditional use permit, obligating the university to provide a transportation plan, a community impact statement, and to address other neighborhood concerns about the new use of the property in an open forum.

=== On-campus criticism ===
Students expressed concern about the proximity of the planned arena to on-campus student housing, listing site-specific concerns such as physical security, noise, and "the out-of-place scale" of building in an academically focused residential area.

== Sellout games ==
	Opponent	Attendance	Year
1	Oregon State	12,369	2010–11
2	USC*	12,364	2010–11
3	Stanford	12,364	2010–11
4	Stanford	12,364	2012–13
5	Washington	12,364	2012–13
6	Arizona	12,364	2013–14
7	Army	12,364	2016–17
8	UCLA	12,364	2016–17
9	Oregon State	12,364	2016–17
10	Stanford	12,364	2016–17
11	Arizona	12,364	2016–17
12	Utah	12,364	2016–17
13	UCLA	12,364	2017–18
14	Oregon State	12,364	2017–18
15	Oregon State	12,364	2018–19
16	Oregon State	12,364	2019–20
17	Arizona State	12,364	2019–20
18	Washington State	12,364	2019–20
19	Washington	12,364	2019–20

(*) Opening night at Matthew Knight Arena
Women's games in italics

== See also ==
- List of NCAA Division I basketball arenas
