= 2019–20 NC State Wolfpack women's basketball team =

Intercollegiate basketball season

2019–20 NC State Wolfpack women's basketball

ACC tournament champions
- Conference: Atlantic Coast Conference

Ranking
- Coaches: No. 8
- AP: No. 8
- Record: 27–4 (14–4 ACC)
- Head coach: Wes Moore (7th season)
- Assistant coaches: Lindsay Edmonds; Simon Harris; Erin Batth
- Home arena: Reynolds Coliseum

2019–20 ACC women's basketball standings
	Conf.				Overall
Team	W		L	PCT	W		L	PCT
No. 6 Louisville	16	–	2	.889	28	–	4	.875
No. 8 NC State†	14	–	4	.778	28	–	4	.875
Duke	12	–	6	.667	18	–	12	.600
No. 18 Florida State	11	–	7	.611	24	–	8	.750
Virginia Tech	11	–	7	.611	21	–	9	.700
Boston College	11	–	7	.611	20	–	12	.625
Georgia Tech	10	–	8	.556	20	–	11	.645
Syracuse	9	–	9	.500	16	–	15	.516
Virginia	8	–	10	.444	13	–	17	.433
Notre Dame	8	–	10	.444	13	–	18	.419
Miami (FL)	7	–	11	.389	15	–	15	.500
North Carolina	7	–	11	.389	16	–	14	.533
Wake Forest	7	–	11	.389	16	–	16	.500
Clemson	3	–	15	.167	8	–	23	.258
Pittsburgh	1	–	17	.056	5	–	26	.161
† 2020 ACC tournament winner As of March 5, 2020; Rankings from AP poll

The 2019–20 NC State Wolfpack women's basketball team represented North Carolina State University during the 2019–20 NCAA Division I women's basketball season. The Wolfpack were led by seventh-year head coach Wes Moore and played their home games at Reynolds Coliseum as members of the Atlantic Coast Conference.

They finished the season 27–4, 14–4 in ACC play to finish in second place. They advanced to the finals of the ACC women's tournament, where they defeated Florida State to win the ACC Tournament for the first time since 1991. As winners of the conference tournament, the Wolfpack received an automatic bid to the 2020 NCAA Division I women's basketball tournament. However, due to concerns with the COVID-19 pandemic, the NCAA Tournament was canceled on March 12, 2020.

== Previous season ==
They finished the 2018–19 season 28–6, 11–5 in ACC play to finish in a tie for third place. They advanced to the semifinals of the ACC women's tournament, where they lost to Louisville. They received an at-large bid to the NCAA women's tournament, where they defeated Maine and Kentucky in the first and second rounds before losing to Iowa in the sweet sixteen.

== Off-season ==
=== Recruiting class ===
College recruiting
Name	Hometown	School	Height	Weight	Commit date
Jakia Brown-Turner; W	Temple Hills, Maryland	Bishop McNamara	6 ft 0 in (1.83 m)	N/A	
Jakia Brown-Turner; W	Recruit ratings: ESPN: (98)				
Jada Boyd; F	Petersburg, Virginia	Appomattox County	6 ft 2 in (1.88 m)	N/A	
Jada Boyd; F	Recruit ratings: ESPN: (97)				
Camille Hobby; C	Ponte Vedra Beach, Florida	Nease	6 ft 1 in (1.85 m)	N/A	
Camille Hobby; C	Recruit ratings: ESPN: (91)				
Kendal Moore; PG	Fayetteville, North Carolina	Pine Forest	5 ft 6 in (1.68 m)	N/A	
Kendal Moore; PG	Recruit ratings: ESPN: (90)				
Elle Sutphin; F	Pilot Mountain, North Carolina	East Surry	6 ft 3 in (1.91 m)	N/A	
Elle Sutphin; F	Recruit ratings: ESPN: (90)				
Overall recruit ranking:
Note: In many cases, Scout, Rivals, 247Sports, On3, and ESPN may conflict in their listings of height and weight.; In these cases, the average was taken. ESPN grades are on a 100-point scale.; Sources:

== Roster ==
2019–20 NC State Wolfpack women's basketball team
Players
Coaches

Pos.	#	Name	Height	Year	Previous school	Hometown
G	1	Aislinn Konig	5 ft 10 in (1.78 m)	Sr	Brookswood Secondary	Surrey, BC
G	2	Kaila Ealey	5 ft 9 in (1.75 m)	GS	Needham Broughton	Raleigh, NC
G	3	Kai Crutchfield	5 ft 9 in (1.75 m)	Jr	Millbrook	Raleigh, NC
G	5	Jada Boyd	6 ft 2 in (1.88 m)	Fr	Appomattox County	Petersburg, VA
G	11	Jakia Brown-Turner	6 ft 0 in (1.83 m)	Fr	Bishop McNamara	Temple Hills, MD
G	15	Kendal Moore	5 ft 6 in (1.68 m)	Fr	Pine Forest	Fayetteville, NC
F	20	Elle Sutphin	6 ft 3 in (1.91 m)	Fr	East Surry	Pilot Mountain, NC
G	23	Grace Hunter	5 ft 10 in (1.78 m)	RS Sr	Athens Drive	Raleigh, NC
C	24	Erika Cassell	6 ft 2 in (1.88 m)	Sr	Holy Innocents	Marietta, GA
F	25	Kayla Jones	6 ft 1 in (1.85 m)	Jr	Riverside	Jamesville, NC
F	31	Jada Rice	6 ft 4 in (1.93 m)	So	Collins Hill	Suwanee, GA
C	33	Elissa Cunane	6 ft 5 in (1.96 m)	So	Northern Guilford	Summerfield, NC
G	40	Katie Wadsworth	5 ft 6 in (1.68 m)	Sr	Needham Broughton	Raleigh, NC
C	41	Camille Hobby	6 ft 1 in (1.85 m)	Fr	Nease	Ponte Vedra Beach, FL

Head coach

- Wes Moore (NC State)

Assistant coach(es)

- Lindsay Edmonds (Appalachian State)
- Simon Harris (NC State)
- Erin Batth (Clemson)

Legend

- (C) Team captain
- (S) Suspended
- (I) Ineligible
- (W) Walk-on
- Injured
- Current redshirt

Roster
Last update: November 20, 2019

== Schedule ==
Date time, TV	Rank^{#}	Opponent^{#}	Result	Record	Site (attendance) city, state
Exhibition
October 31, 2019*; 7:00 p.m., ACCNX	No. 14	Anderson	W 76–47	–	Reynolds Coliseum (794); Raleigh, NC
Non-conference regular season
November 6, 2019*; 7:00 p.m., ACCNX	No. 14	North Carolina A&T	W 80–44	1–0	Reynolds Coliseum (2,833); Raleigh, NC
November 10, 2019*; 2:00 p.m., ACCNX	No. 14	UNC Wilmington	W 80–40	2–0	Reynolds Coliseum (3,015); Raleigh, NC
November 14, 2019*; 7:00 p.m., ACCNX	No. 14	Lamar	W 81–40	3–0	Reynolds Coliseum (2,612); Raleigh, NC
November 19, 2019*; 10:30 a.m., ACCNX	No. 14	Maine	W 62–34	4–0	Reynolds Coliseum (5,137); Raleigh, NC
November 24, 2019*; 5:00 p.m., WCCN	No. 14	at Saint Mary's	W 87–70	5–0	McKeon Pavilion (321); Moraga, CA
November 29, 2019*; 7:30 p.m.	No. 12	vs. Texas; Heineken Rainbow Wahine Showdown	W 84–73	6–0	Stan Sheriff Center; Honolulu, HI
November 30, 2019*; 7:30 p.m.	No. 12	at Hawaii; Heineken Rainbow Wahine Showdown	W 68–59	7–0	Stan Sheriff Center (1,265); Honolulu, HI
December 1, 2019*; 5:00 p.m.	No. 12	vs. North Texas; Heineken Rainbow Wahine Showdown	W 76–65	8–0	Stan Sheriff Center; Honolulu, HI
December 5, 2019*; 7:00 p.m., ESPN	No. 13	No. 9 Maryland; ACC–Big Ten Women's Challenge	W 66–59	9–0	Reynolds Coliseum (4,033); Raleigh, NC
December 15, 2019*; 12:00 p.m., ACCN	No. 9	Elon	W 62–49	10–0	Reynolds Coliseum (3,045); Raleigh, NC
December 19, 2019*; 6:30 p.m., ACCN	No. 9	Chattanooga	W 74–38	11–0	Reynolds Coliseum (2,633); Raleigh, NC
Conference regular season
December 29, 2019; 12:00 p.m., ACCN	No. 9	at Boston College	W 72–54	12–0 (1–0)	Conte Forum (1,323); Chestnut Hill, MA
January 2, 2020; 7:00 p.m., ACCNX	No. 9	Virginia Tech	W 76–69	13–0 (2–0)	Reynolds Coliseum (4,153); Raleigh, NC
January 5, 2020; 12:00 p.m., ACCRSN	No. 9	Virginia	W 80–60	14–0 (3–0)	Reynolds Coliseum (4,487); Raleigh, NC
January 9, 2020; 7:00 p.m., ACCRSN	No. 9	at North Carolina; Rivalry	L 60–66	14–1 (3–1)	Carmichael Arena (2,655); Chapel Hill, NC
January 12, 2020; 4:00 p.m., ACCN	No. 9	at Notre Dame	W 90–56	15–1 (4–1)	Edmund P. Joyce Center (7,861); Notre Dame, IN
January 16, 2020; 6:00 p.m., ACCN	No. 9	No. 13 Florida State	W 68–51	16–1 (5–1)	Reynolds Coliseum (4,112); Raleigh, NC
January 19, 2020; 2:00 p.m., ACCRSN	No. 9	Wake Forest	W 59–45	17–1 (6–1)	Reynolds Coliseum (5,052); Raleigh, NC
January 23, 2020; 7:00 p.m., ACCNX	No. 8	at Pittsburgh	W 88–44	18–1 (7–1)	Petersen Events Center (832); Pittsburgh, PA
January 26, 2020; 6:00 p.m., ACCN	No. 8	North Carolina; Rivalry	W 76–68	19–1 (8–1)	Reynolds Coliseum (5,591); Raleigh, NC
January 30, 2020; 7:00 p.m., ACCRSN	No. 7	at Clemson	W 79–60	20–1 (9–1)	Littlejohn Coliseum (1,257); Clemson, SC
February 2, 2020; 2:00 p.m., ACCNX	No. 7	at Duke	W 63–60	21–1 (10–1)	Cameron Indoor Stadium (4,209); Durham, NC
February 6, 2020; 7:00 p.m., ACCNX	No. 7	at Virginia Tech	W 71–59	22–1 (11–1)	Cassell Coliseum (2,271); Blacksburg, VA
February 13, 2020; 8:00 p.m., ACCN	No. 4	No. 9 Louisville	L 59–66	22–2 (11–2)	Reynolds Coliseum (5,575); Raleigh, NC
February 16, 2020; 2:00 p.m., ACCN	No. 4	Georgia Tech	L 61–65	22–3 (11–3)	Reynolds Coliseum (5,542); Raleigh, NC
February 20, 2020; 8:00 p.m., ACCN	No. 10	at Miami (FL)	W 50–48	23–3 (12–3)	Watsco Center (1,402); Coral Gables, FL
February 24, 2020; 7:00 p.m., ESPN2	No. 8	Duke; Play4Kay Game	L 65–70	23–4 (12–4)	Reynolds Coliseum (5,580); Raleigh, NC
February 27, 2020; 8:00 p.m., ACCN	No. 8	Syracuse	W 69–60	24–4 (13–4)	Reynolds Coliseum (3,779); Raleigh, NC
March 1, 2020; 2:00 p.m., ACCRSN	No. 8	at Virginia	W 75–64	25–4 (14–4)	John Paul Jones Arena; Charlottesville, VA
ACC Women's Tournament
March 6, 2020; 6:00 p.m., RSN	(2) No. 10	vs. (7) Georgia Tech; Quarterfinals	W 57–48	26–4	Greensboro Coliseum (5,492); Greensboro, NC
March 7, 2020; 2:00 p.m., ESPNU	(2) No. 10	vs. (6) Boston College; Semifinals	W 82–75	27–4	Greensboro Coliseum (6,751); Greensboro, NC
March 8, 2020; 12:00 p.m., ESPN2	(2) No. 10	vs. (4) No. 22 Florida State; Finals	W 71–66	28–4	Greensboro Coliseum (7,324); Greensboro, NC
*Non-conference game. ^{#}Rankings from AP Poll. (#) Tournament seedings in parentheses. All times are in Eastern.

== Rankings ==
Regular season polls
Poll	Pre- season	Week 2	Week 3	Week 4	Week 5	Week 6	Week 7	Week 8	Week 9	Week 10	Week 11	Week 12	Week 13	Week 14	Week 15	Week 16	Week 17	Week 18	Week 19	Final
AP	14	14	14	T-12	13	9	9	9	9	9	9	8	7	7	4	10	8	10	8	8
Coaches	12	12	12	12	9	9	9	9	8	10	8	7	7	4	10	11	10	8	8	N/A

Legend
	Increase in ranking
	Decrease in ranking
	Not ranked previous week
(RV)	Received votes

Coaches did not release a Week 2 poll, and AP does not release a final poll. Due to the cancellation of the NCAA Tournament, the coaches poll did not release a final ranking.
