= 2019–20 Georgia Tech Yellow Jackets women's basketball team =

Intercollegiate basketball season

2019–20 Georgia Tech Yellow Jackets women's basketball
- Conference: Atlantic Coast Conference
- Record: 20–11 (10–8 ACC)
- Head coach: Nell Fortner (1st season)
- Assistant coaches: Tasha Butts; Blanche Alverson; Brandy Manning
- Home arena: McCamish Pavilion

2019–20 ACC women's basketball standings
	Conf.				Overall
Team	W		L	PCT	W		L	PCT
No. 6 Louisville	16	–	2	.889	28	–	4	.875
No. 8 NC State†	14	–	4	.778	28	–	4	.875
Duke	12	–	6	.667	18	–	12	.600
No. 18 Florida State	11	–	7	.611	24	–	8	.750
Virginia Tech	11	–	7	.611	21	–	9	.700
Boston College	11	–	7	.611	20	–	12	.625
Georgia Tech	10	–	8	.556	20	–	11	.645
Syracuse	9	–	9	.500	16	–	15	.516
Virginia	8	–	10	.444	13	–	17	.433
Notre Dame	8	–	10	.444	13	–	18	.419
Miami (FL)	7	–	11	.389	15	–	15	.500
North Carolina	7	–	11	.389	16	–	14	.533
Wake Forest	7	–	11	.389	16	–	16	.500
Clemson	3	–	15	.167	8	–	23	.258
Pittsburgh	1	–	17	.056	5	–	26	.161
† 2020 ACC tournament winner As of March 5, 2020; Rankings from AP poll

The 2019–20 Georgia Tech Yellow Jackets women's basketball team represented Georgia Institute of Technology during the 2019-20 NCAA Division I women's basketball season. They were led by first-year head coach Nell Fortner and played their home games at Hank McCamish Pavilion as members of the Atlantic Coast Conference.

The Yellow Jackets finished the season 20–11 and 10–8 in ACC play to finish in seventh place. As the seventh seed in the ACC tournament, they defeated Pittsburgh in the Second Round before losing to eventual champion NC State in Quarterfinals. The NCAA tournament and WNIT were cancelled due to the COVID-19 outbreak.

== Previous season ==
They finished the 2018–19 season 17–13, 7–9 in ACC play to finish in ninth place. They advanced to the second round of the ACC women's tournament where they lost to North Carolina. Despite having 17 wins, they were not invited to a postseason tournament for the first time since 2013.

== Off-season ==
=== Recruiting class ===
College recruiting information
Name	Hometown	School	Height	Weight	Commit date
Anaya Boyd; G	Hampton, GA	Lovejoy	6 ft 0 in (1.83 m)	N/A	
Anaya Boyd; G	Recruit ratings: No ratings found				
Avyonce Carter; G	Norcross, GA	Wesleyan School	5 ft 10 in (1.78 m)	N/A	
Avyonce Carter; G	Recruit ratings: No ratings found				
Eylia Love; G/F	Olathe, KS	Olathe	6 ft 0 in (1.83 m)	N/A	
Eylia Love; G/F	Recruit ratings: No ratings found				
Loyal McQueen; G	Darlington, SC	Wilson	5 ft 8 in (1.73 m)	N/A	
Loyal McQueen; G	Recruit ratings: No ratings found				
Overall recruit ranking:
Note: In many cases, Scout, Rivals, 247Sports, On3, and ESPN may conflict in their listings of height and weight.; In these cases, the average was taken. ESPN grades are on a 100-point scale.; Sources:

== Roster ==
2019–20 Georgia Tech Yellow Jackets women's basketball team
Players
Coaches

Pos.	#	Name	Height	Year	Previous school	Hometown
F	00	Daijah Jefferson	6 ft 2 in (1.88 m)	RS So	Hopewell	Hopewell, VA
G	2	Jasmine Carson	5 ft 10 in (1.78 m)	So	McEachern	Memphis, TN
G	3	Sarah Bates	5 ft 9 in (1.75 m)	RS So	Kansas State	Fresno, California
F	4	Anne Francoise Diouf	6 ft 4 in (1.93 m)	RS Jr	IMG Academy	Dakar, Senegal
G	12	Kondalia Montgomery	5 ft 7 in (1.7 m)	So	Lincoln	Tacoma, WA
G	13	Lorela Cubaj	6 ft 4 in (1.93 m)	Jr	Istituto Paritario G. Parini	Terni, Italy
C	20	Nerea Hermosa	6 ft 5 in (1.96 m)	Fr	IES Joaquim Blume	Victoria, Spain
F/C	21	Ronni Nwora	6 ft 2 in (1.88 m)	Fr	The Park School of Buffalo	Buffalo, New York
G	24	Chanin Scott	6 ft 0 in (1.83 m)	Jr	Meyers Park	Charlotte, NC
G	31	Lotta-Maj Lahtinen	5 ft 7 in (1.7 m)	So	None	Helsinki, Finland
G	33	Francesca Pan	6 ft 1 in (1.85 m)	Sr	None	Bassano del Grappa, Italy
G	41	Kierra Fletcher	5 ft 9 in (1.75 m)	Jr	Warren Cousino	Warren, MI

Head coach

- Nell Fortner (Texas)

Assistant coach(es)

- Tasha Butts (Tennessee)
- Blanche Alverson (Auburn)
- Brandy Manning (Clark Atlanta)

Legend

- (C) Team captain
- (S) Suspended
- (I) Ineligible
- (W) Walk-on
- Injured
- Current redshirt

Roster
Last update: November 18, 2019

== Schedule ==
Date time, TV	Rank^{#}	Opponent^{#}	Result	Record	Site (attendance) city, state
Exhibition
October 30, 2019*; 2:00 pm, ACCN Extra		Clayton State	W 73–35	–	McCamish Pavilion (731); Atlanta, GA
Non-conference regular season
November 5, 2019*; 12:00 pm, ACCN Extra		Houston	W 69–38	1–0	McCamish Pavilion (921); Atlanta, GA
November 10, 2019*; 2:00 pm, ACCN Extra		Grambling State	W 71–53	2–0	McCamish Pavilion (1,120); Atlanta, GA
November 17, 2019*; 2:00 pm, SECN+		at Georgia; Rivalry	W 73–40	3–0	Stegeman Coliseum (3,362); Athens, GA
November 20, 2019*; 7:00 pm, ACCN Extra		Georgia State	W 69–28	4–0	McCamish Pavilion (871); Atlanta, GA
November 28, 2019*; 5:15 pm, FloHoops		vs. Seton Hall; Junkanoo Jam	W 79–54	5–0	Gateway Christian Academy; Bimini, Bahamas
November 30, 2019*; 2:00 p.m., FloHoops		vs. Rutgers; Junkanoo Jam	L 43–46	5–1	Gateway Christian Academy (150); Bimini, Bahamas
December 5, 2019*; 7:00 pm, ACCN Extra		Wisconsin; ACC–Big Ten Women's Challenge	W 60–41	6–1	McCamish Pavilion (1,016); Atlanta, GA
December 8, 2019*; 2:00 pm		at Kennesaw State	W 63–47	7–1	KSU Convocation Center (769); Kennesaw, GA
December 15, 2019*; 2:00 pm, ACCN Extra		East Tennessee State	W 87–48	8–1	McCamish Pavilion (1,642); Atlanta, GA
December 20, 2019*; 5:00 pm, ACCN Extra		No. 11 Texas A&M; Coqui Classic	L 48–60	8–2	Mario Morales Coliseum (100); San Juan, Puerto Rico
December 21, 2019*; 4:00 pm		vs. Rice; Coqui Classic	W 54–52	9–2	Mario Morales Coliseum (100); San Juan, Puerto Rico
ACC regular season
December 29, 2019; 2:00 pm, ACCN Extra		Virginia	W 61–51	10–2 (1–0)	McCamish Pavilion (1,422); Atlanta, GA
January 2, 2020*; 2:00 pm, ACCN Extra		No. 23 Miami (FL)	W 61–54	11–2 (2–0)	McCamish Pavilion (1,235); Atlanta, GA
January 5, 2020; 12:00 pm, ACC Network		at Wake Forest	L 60–65	11–3 (2–1)	LJVM Coliseum (863); Winston-Salem, NC
January 9, 2020; 7:00 pm, ACCN Extra		at No. 11 Florida State	W 67–52	12–3 (3–1)	Donald L. Tucker Civic Center (2,663); Tallahassee, FL
January 12, 2020; 2:00 pm, ACCN Extra		Clemson	W 49–47	13–3 (4–1)	McCamish Pavilion (1,620); Atlanta, GA
January 16, 2020; 7:30 pm, ACCN Extra		at Syracuse	W 82–64	14–3 (5–1)	Carrier Dome (1,720); Syracuse, NY
January 19, 2020; 2:00 pm, ACCN Extra		Boston College	L 48–55	14–4 (5–2)	McCamish Pavilion (2,577); Atlanta, GA
January 23, 2020; 6:00 pm, RSN		North Carolina	L 60–67 ^{OT}	14–5 (5–3)	McCamish Pavilion (1,201); Atlanta, GA
January 26, 2020; 2:00 pm, ACCN Extra		at Duke	L 46–58	14–6 (5–4)	Cameron Indoor Stadium (3,451); Durham, NC
January 30, 2020; 6:00 pm, ACC Network		at Miami (FL)	L 49–54 ^{OT}	14–7 (5–5)	Watsco Center (847); Miami, FL
February 2, 2020; 2:00 pm, ACC Network		Notre Dame	L 51–59	14–8 (5–6)	McCamish Pavilion (1,749); Atlanta, GA
February 6, 2020; 7:00 pm, ACCN Extra		at Pittsburgh	W 77–48	15–8 (6–6)	Petersen Events Center (591); Pittsburgh, PA
February 9, 2020; 2:00 pm, ACCN Extra		Wake Forest	W 62–52	16–8 (7–6)	McCamish Pavilion (1,578); Atlanta, GA
February 13, 2020; 7:00 pm, ACCN Extra		at Virginia Tech	L 61–64 ^{OT}	16–9 (7–7)	Cassell Coliseum (1,326); Blacksburg, VA
February 16, 2020; 2:00 pm, ACCN Extra		at No. 4 NC State	W 65–61	17–9 (8–7)	Reynolds Coliseum (542); Raleigh, NC
February 20, 2020; 6:00 pm, RSN		No. 5 Louisville	L 47–58	17–10 (8–8)	McCamish Pavilion (1,188); Atlanta, GA
February 23, 2020; 4:00 pm, ACCN		No. 17 Florida State	W 65–62	18–10 (9–8)	McCamish Pavilion (1,787); Atlanta, GA
March 1, 2020; 1:00 pm, ACCN Extra		at Clemson	W 56–44	19–10 (10–8)	Littlejohn Coliseum (1,484); Clemson, SC
ACC Women's Tournament
March 5, 2020; 6:00 p.m., RSN	(7)	vs. (15) Pittsburgh; Second round	W 68–58	20–10	Greensboro Coliseum (3,638); Greensboro, NC
March 6, 2020; 6:00 p.m., RSN	(7)	vs. (2) No. 10 NC State; Quarterfinals	L 48–57	20–11	Greensboro Coliseum (5,492); Greensboro, NC
*Non-conference game. ^{#}Rankings from AP Poll,. (#) Tournament seedings in parentheses. All times are in Eastern Time.

== Rankings ==
Regular season polls
Poll	Pre- Season	Week 2	Week 3	Week 4	Week 5	Week 6	Week 7	Week 8	Week 9	Week 10	Week 11	Week 12	Week 13	Week 14	Week 15	Week 16	Week 17	Week 18	Week 19	Final
AP											RV									N/A
Coaches						RV	RV	RV		RV										

Legend
	Increase in ranking
	Decrease in ranking
	Not ranked previous week
(RV)	Received Votes

== See also ==
2019–20 Georgia Tech Yellow Jackets men's basketball team
