= 2019–20 North Carolina Tar Heels women's basketball team =

Intercollegiate basketball season

2019–20 North Carolina Tar Heels women's basketball
- Conference: Atlantic Coast Conference
- Record: 16–14 (7–11 ACC)
- Head coach: Courtney Banghart (1st season)
- Assistant coaches: Carrie Moore; Tim Taylor; Joanne Aluka-White
- Home arena: Carmichael Arena

2019–20 ACC women's basketball standings
	Conf.				Overall
Team	W		L	PCT	W		L	PCT
No. 6 Louisville	16	–	2	.889	28	–	4	.875
No. 8 NC State†	14	–	4	.778	28	–	4	.875
Duke	12	–	6	.667	18	–	12	.600
No. 18 Florida State	11	–	7	.611	24	–	8	.750
Virginia Tech	11	–	7	.611	21	–	9	.700
Boston College	11	–	7	.611	20	–	12	.625
Georgia Tech	10	–	8	.556	20	–	11	.645
Syracuse	9	–	9	.500	16	–	15	.516
Virginia	8	–	10	.444	13	–	17	.433
Notre Dame	8	–	10	.444	13	–	18	.419
Miami (FL)	7	–	11	.389	15	–	15	.500
North Carolina	7	–	11	.389	16	–	14	.533
Wake Forest	7	–	11	.389	16	–	16	.500
Clemson	3	–	15	.167	8	–	23	.258
Pittsburgh	1	–	17	.056	5	–	26	.161
† 2020 ACC tournament winner As of March 5, 2020; Rankings from AP poll

The 2019–20 North Carolina Tar Heels women's basketball team represented the University of North Carolina at Chapel Hill during the 2019–20 NCAA Division I women's basketball season. The Tar Heels, led by first-year head coach Courtney Banghart, played their games at Carmichael Arena and were members of the Atlantic Coast Conference.

The Tar Heels finished the season 16–14 and 7–11 in ACC play to finish in a tie for eleventh place. As the twelfth seed in the ACC tournament, they lost to Wake Forest in the first round. The NCAA tournament and WNIT were cancelled due to the COVID-19 outbreak.

== Previous season ==
For the 2018–19 season, the Tar Heels finished 18–15 overall and 9–9 in ACC play, to finish in eighth place. North Carolina was eliminated in the second round of the ACC tournament by Notre Dame. They received an at-large bid to the NCAA women's tournament, which was their first trip since 2015. They lost in the first round to California.

On April 18, Sylvia Hatchell resigned after an external review confirmed reports that she had made racially insensitive comments and mismanaged players' medical issues. Hatchell, the only coach with national titles in the AIAW, NAIA, and NCAA, left Chapel Hill with 1,023 wins overall and 751 in 33 seasons with the Tar Heels, including the 1994 NCAA title. The school tabbed Princeton's Courtney Banghart as their new head coach on April 29, officially announcing her the next day.

== Off-season ==
=== Recruiting class ===
College recruiting
Name	Hometown	School	Height	Weight	Commit date
Malu Tshitenge; F	Germantown, Maryland	St. John's College	6 ft 3 in (1.91 m)	N/A	
Malu Tshitenge; F	Recruit ratings: ESPN: (97)				
Nia Daniel; G	Charlotte, NC	Hickory Ridge	5 ft 11 in (1.80 m)	N/A	
Nia Daniel; G	Recruit ratings: ESPN: (90)				
Alexis Duckett; G	Daytona Beach, FL	Father Lopez	5 ft 10 in (1.78 m)	N/A	
Alexis Duckett; G	Recruit ratings: ESPN: (90)				
Kennady Tucker; PG	Little Rock, AR	North Little Rock	5 ft 10 in (1.78 m)	N/A	
Kennady Tucker; PG	Recruit ratings: ESPN: (90)				
Overall recruit ranking:
Note: In many cases, Scout, Rivals, 247Sports, On3, and ESPN may conflict in their listings of height and weight.; In these cases, the average was taken. ESPN grades are on a 100-point scale.; Sources:

== Roster ==
2019–20 North Carolina Tar Heels women's basketball team
Players
Coaches

Pos.	#	Name	Height	Year	Previous school	Hometown
G	1	Taylor Koenen	6 ft 2 in (1.88 m)	Sr	Shakopee	Savage, MN
G	3	Madinah Muhammad	5 ft 8 in (1.73 m)	RS Sr	Whitney Young; Ole Miss	Chicago, IL
G	4	Kennady Tucker	5 ft 10 in (1.78 m)	Fr	North Little Rock	Little Rock, AR
G	10	Claudia Dickey	5 ft 10 in (1.78 m)	So	Charlotte Latin	Charlotte, NC
F	11	Emily Sullivan	6 ft 4 in (1.93 m)	RS Jr	Reitz Memorial	Evansville, IN
G	14	Liz Roberts (W)	5 ft 8 in (1.73 m)	Sr	Durham Academy	Chapel Hill, NC
G	15	Olivia Smith	6 ft 0 in (1.83 m)	Sr	Cardinal Gibbons	Raleigh, NC
G	20	Leah Church	5 ft 8 in (1.73 m)	Jr	Forest Trail Academy	Purlear, NC
F	21	Malu Tshitenge	6 ft 3 in (1.91 m)	Fr	St. John's College	Germantown, MD
G	22	Shayla Bennett	5 ft 9 in (1.75 m)	Sr	Christ Church School; Gulf Coast State	Piedmont, SC
C	30	Janelle Bailey	6 ft 4 in (1.93 m)	RS Jr	Lake Highland Prep	Ocoee, FL
G	32	Nia Daniel	5 ft 10 in (1.78 m)	Fr	Hickory Ridge	Charlotte, NC
G	33	Lexi Duckett	5 ft 11 in (1.8 m)	Fr	Father Lopez	Daytona Beach, FL
C	34	Naomi Van Nes	6 ft 6 in (1.98 m)	Sr	Hamden Country Day	Dorchester, England
F	44	Jaelynn Murray	6 ft 2 in (1.88 m)	Jr	Dreher	Columbia, SC

Head coach

- Courtney Banghart (Dartmouth)

Assistant coach(es)

- Carrie Moore (Western Michigan)
- Tim Taylor (James Madison)
- Joanne Aluka-White (Middle Tennessee)

Legend

- (C) Team captain
- (S) Suspended
- (I) Ineligible
- (W) Walk-on
- Injured
- Current redshirt

Roster
Last update: November 26, 2019

== Schedule ==
Date time, TV	Rank^{#}	Opponent^{#}	Result	Record	Site (attendance) city, state
Exhibition
November 2, 2019*; 2:00 p.m.		Wingate	W 82–37		Carmichael Arena (423); Chapel Hill, NC
Non-conference regular season
November 7, 2019*; 6:00 p.m., ACCNX		Western Carolina	W 92–55	1–0	Carmichael Arena (1,629); Chapel Hill, NC
November 11, 2019*; 7:00 p.m., ACCN		Navy	W 80–40	2–0	Carmichael Arena (1,562); Chapel Hill, NC
November 15, 2019*; 5:00 p.m., ACCNX		Charleston Southern	W 85–54	3–0	Carmichael Arena (1,424); Chapel Hill, NC
November 22, 2019*; 6:00 p.m., ACCNX		Elon	W 76–46	4–0	Carmichael Arena (1,674); Chapel Hill, NC
November 28, 2019*; 9:00 p.m., FloHoops		vs. Temple; Cancún Challenge	W 71–58	5–0	Hard Rock Hotel Riviera Maya (186); Cancún, Mexico
November 29, 2019*; 6:30 p.m., FloHoops		vs. Missouri; Cancún Challenge	W 82–69	6–0	Hard Rock Hotel Riviera Maya (157); Cancún, Mexico
December 5, 2019*; 6:00 p.m., ACCN		Illinois; ACC–Big Ten Women's Challenge	W 85–60	7–0	Carmichael Arena (2,116); Chapel Hill, NC
December 8, 2019*; 2:00 p.m., ACCNX		North Carolina Central	W 92–53	8–0	Carmichael Arena (1,614); Chapel Hill, NC
December 15, 2019*; 3:00 p.m.		at Alabama	L 77–83	8–1	Coleman Coliseum (2,235); Tuscaloosa, AL
December 20, 2019*; 7:00 p.m.		vs. UNC Wilmington; Carolina's Challenge	W 85–45	9–1	Myrtle Beach Convention Center (850); Myrtle Beach, SC
December 28, 2019*; 1:00 p.m., ACCNX		Yale	L 63–66	9–2	Carmichael Arena (2,632); Chapel Hill, NC
Conference regular season
December 30, 2019; 2:00 p.m., RSN		Pittsburgh	W 70–62	10–2 (1–0)	Carmichael Arena (1,852); Chapel Hill, NC
January 2, 2020; 7:00 p.m., ACCNX		at Virginia	W 65–47	11–2 (2–0)	John Paul Jones Arena (2,757); Charlottesville, VA
January 5, 2020; 2:00 p.m., ACCNX		at Virginia Tech	L 70–76	11–3 (2–1)	Cassell Coliseum (1,939); Blacksburg, VA
January 9, 2020; 7:00 p.m., RSN		No. 9 NC State; Rivalry	W 66–60	12–3 (3–1)	Carmichael Arena (2,655); Chapel Hill, NC
January 12, 2020; 2:00 p.m., ACCNX		at No. 11 Florida State	L 64–78	12–4 (3–2)	Donald L. Tucker Center (2,803); Tallahassee, FL
January 16, 2020; 6:00 p.m., ACCNX		Miami (FL)	W 78–58	13–4 (4–2)	Carmichael Arena (1,535); Chapel Hill, NC
January 19, 2020; 1:00 p.m., ESPN2		No. 5 Louisville	L 67–74	13–5 (4–3)	Carmichael Arena (4,027); Chapel Hill, NC
January 23, 2020; 6:00 p.m., RSN		at Georgia Tech	W 67–60 ^{OT}	14–5 (5–3)	McCamish Pavilion (1,201); Atlanta, GA
January 26, 2020; 6:00 p.m., ACCN		at No. 8 NC State; Rivalry	L 68–76	14–6 (5–4)	Reynolds Coliseum (5,591); Raleigh, NC
January 30, 2020; 6:00 p.m., ACCNX		Virginia	W 78–68	15–6 (6–4)	Carmichael Arena (1,967); Chapel Hill, NC
February 2, 2020; 2:00 p.m., ACCNX		Clemson	W 86–72	16–6 (7–4)	Carmichael Arena (1,952); Chapel Hill, NC
February 6, 2020; 6:00 p.m., ACCN		at Duke; Rivalry	L 61–71	16–7 (7–5)	Cameron Indoor Stadium (5,686); Durham, NC
February 9, 2020; 2:00 p.m., RSN		Virginia Tech	L 63–72	16–8 (7–6)	Carmichael Arena (2,536); Chapel Hill, NC
February 13, 2020; 7:00 p.m., RSN		Syracuse	L 56–74	16–9 (7–7)	Carmichael Arena (1,564); Chapel Hill, NC
February 16, 2020; 12:00 p.m., ACCNX		at Boston College	L 75–93	16–10 (7–8)	Conte Forum (2,217); Chestnut Hill, MA
February 23, 2020; 12:00 p.m., RSN		at Wake Forest	L 79–82 ^{OT}	16–11 (7–9)	LJVM Coliseum (1,520); Winston-Salem, NC
February 27, 2020; 7:00 p.m., ACCNX		at Notre Dame	L 65–83	16–12 (7–10)	Edmund P. Joyce Center (7,639); Notre Dame, IN
March 1, 2020; 2:00 p.m., ESPN2		Duke; Rivalry	L 54–73	16–13 (7–11)	Carmichael Arena (4,916); Chapel Hill, NC
ACC Women's Tournament
March 4, 2020; 1:00 p.m., RSN	(12)	vs. (13) Wake Forest; First round	L 73–83	16–14	Greensboro Coliseum (2,795); Greensboro, NC
*Non-conference game. ^{#}Rankings from AP Poll. (#) Tournament seedings in parentheses. All times are in Eastern.

== Rankings ==
Regular season polls
Poll	Pre- season	Week 2	Week 3	Week 4	Week 5	Week 6	Week 7	Week 8	Week 9	Week 10	Week 11	Week 12	Week 13	Week 14	Week 15	Week 16	Week 17	Week 18	Week 19	Final
AP	RV				RV	RV														
Coaches																				

Legend
	Increase in ranking
	Decrease in ranking
	Not ranked previous week
(RV)	Received votes

^Coaches did not release a Week 2 poll.

== See also ==
- 2019–20 North Carolina Tar Heels men's basketball team
