= 2019–20 Miami Hurricanes women's basketball team =

Intercollegiate basketball season

2019–20 Miami Hurricanes women's basketball
- Conference: Atlantic Coast Conference
- Record: 15–15 (7–11 ACC)
- Head coach: Katie Meier (15th season)
- Assistant coaches: Octavia Blue; Tia Jackson; Fitzroy Anthony
- Home arena: Watsco Center

2019–20 ACC women's basketball standings
	Conf.				Overall
Team	W		L	PCT	W		L	PCT
No. 6 Louisville	16	–	2	.889	28	–	4	.875
No. 8 NC State†	14	–	4	.778	28	–	4	.875
Duke	12	–	6	.667	18	–	12	.600
No. 18 Florida State	11	–	7	.611	24	–	8	.750
Virginia Tech	11	–	7	.611	21	–	9	.700
Boston College	11	–	7	.611	20	–	12	.625
Georgia Tech	10	–	8	.556	20	–	11	.645
Syracuse	9	–	9	.500	16	–	15	.516
Virginia	8	–	10	.444	13	–	17	.433
Notre Dame	8	–	10	.444	13	–	18	.419
Miami (FL)	7	–	11	.389	15	–	15	.500
North Carolina	7	–	11	.389	16	–	14	.533
Wake Forest	7	–	11	.389	16	–	16	.500
Clemson	3	–	15	.167	8	–	23	.258
Pittsburgh	1	–	17	.056	5	–	26	.161
† 2020 ACC tournament winner As of March 5, 2020; Rankings from AP poll

The 2019–20 Miami hurricanes women's basketball team represented the University of Miami during the 2019–20 NCAA Division I women's basketball season. The Hurricanes, led by fifteenth-year head coach Katie Meier, played their home games at the Watsco Center and were members of the Atlantic Coast Conference.

The Hurricanes finished the season 15–15 and 7–11 in ACC play to finish in a tie for eleventh place. As the eleventh seed in the ACC tournament, they lost to Clemson in the First Round. The NCAA tournament and WNIT were cancelled due to the COVID-19 outbreak.

== Previous season ==
For the 2018–19 season, the Hurricanes finished 25–9 overall and 10–6, tied for third in the ACC. Miami was eliminated in the quarterfinals of the ACC tournament by Florida State. The Hurricanes received an at-large bid to the NCAA tournament as a four-seed, their fifth consecutive tournament appearance. They defeated Florida Gulf Coast in the first round before losing to Arizona State in the second round.

== Off-season ==
=== Recruiting class ===
College recruiting information
Name	Hometown	School	Height	Weight	Commit date
Sydnee Roby; C	Milwaukee, Wisconsin	Rufus King	6 ft 3 in (1.91 m)	N/A	
Sydnee Roby; C	Recruit ratings: ESPN: (95)				
Brianna Jackson; F	Virginia Beach, Virginia	Princess Anne High School	6 ft 3 in (1.91 m)	N/A	
Brianna Jackson; F	Recruit ratings: ESPN: (93)				
Yasmeen Chang; PG	Naples, Florida	Gulf Coast High School	5 ft 8 in (1.73 m)	N/A	
Yasmeen Chang; PG	Recruit ratings: ESPN: (89)				
Overall recruit ranking:
Note: In many cases, Scout, Rivals, 247Sports, On3, and ESPN may conflict in their listings of height and weight.; In these cases, the average was taken. ESPN grades are on a 100-point scale.; Sources:

== Roster ==
2019–20 Miami Hurricanes women's basketball team
Players
Coaches

Pos.	#	Name	Height	Year	Previous school	Hometown
G	0	Kenza Salgues	5 ft 9 in (1.75 m)	Fr	INSEP	Montpellier, FR
G/F	1	Moulayna Johnson Sidi Baba	6 ft 0 in (1.83 m)	Fr	Solna Gymnasium	Stockholm, Sweden
F	3	Destiny Harden	6 ft 0 in (1.83 m)	RS So	Morgan Park; West Virginia	Chicago, IL
G	4	Endia Banks	5 ft 9 in (1.75 m)	Jr	Duluth	Duluth, GA
G	5	Mykea Gray	5 ft 4 in (1.63 m)	Jr	National Christian Academy	Upper Marlboro, MD
G	12	Jacaira Allen	5 ft 10 in (1.78 m)	RS Jr	Dillard; Mississippi State	Pompano Beach, FL
G	13	Taylor Mason	5 ft 9 in (1.75 m)	Jr	Norcross	Decatur, GA
F	15	Jamir Huston	6 ft 0 in (1.83 m)	So	John Hay	Cleveland, OH
G	20	Kelsey Marshall	5 ft 9 in (1.75 m)	Jr	Miami Country Day School	Davie, FL
F	21	Brianna Jackson	6 ft 3 in (1.91 m)	Fr	Princess Anne	Virginia Beach, VA
G	22	Yasmeen Chang	5 ft 9 in (1.75 m)	Fr	Gulf Coast	Naples, FL
F	32	Beatrice Mompremier	6 ft 4 in (1.93 m)	RS Sr	Miami Senior; Baylor	Miami, FL
C	44	Sydnee Roby	6 ft 3 in (1.91 m)	Fr	Rufus King	Milwaukee, WI

Head coach

- Katie Meier (Duke)

Assistant coach(es)

- Octavia Blue (Miami (FL))
- Tia Jackson (Iowa)
- Fitzroy Anthony (Palm Beach Atlantic)

Legend

- (C) Team captain
- (S) Suspended
- (I) Ineligible
- (W) Walk-on
- Injured
- Current redshirt

Roster
Last update: December 2, 2019

== Schedule ==
Date time, TV	Rank^{#}	Opponent^{#}	Result	Record	Site (attendance) city, state
Exhibition
October 29, 2019*; 7:00 p.m., ACCNX	No. 19	Nova Southeastern	W 90–46	–	Watsco Center (670); Coral Gables, FL
Non-conference regular season
November 10, 2019*; 3:00 p.m., ACCNX	No. 19	Jackson State	W 83–68	1–0	Watsco Center (917); Coral Gables, FL
November 13, 2019*; 11:00 a.m., ACCNX	No. 17	North Florida	W 78–55	2–0	Watsco Center (4,017); Coral Gables, FL
November 17, 2019*; 1:00 p.m., ACCNX	No. 17	IUPUI	W 74–65	3–0	Watsco Center (863); Coral Gables, FL
November 22, 2019*; 2:30 p.m.	No. 16	vs. North Carolina A&T; Maggie Dixon Classic	W 68–67	4–0	McGrath-Phillips Arena (3,062); Chicago, IL
November 23, 2019*; 4:30 p.m.	No. 16	at No. 19 DePaul; Maggie Dixon Classic	L 83–89	4–1	McGrath-Phillips Arena (1,608); Chicago, IL
November 29, 2019*; 2:00 p.m., ACCNX	No. 19	No. 7 Oregon State; Miami Thanksgiving Classic	L 53–75	4–2	Watsco Center (1,336); Coral Gables, FL
November 30, 2019*; 4:30 p.m., ACCNX	No. 19	Miami (OH); Miami Thanksgiving Classic	W 80–62	5–2	Watsco Center (823); Coral Gables, FL
December 4, 2019*; 6:00 pm, ACCN	No. 21	No. 14 Indiana; ACC–Big Ten Women's Challenge	L 45–58	5–3	Watsco Center (848); Coral Gables, FL
December 17, 2019*; 7:00 p.m., ACCN		Binghamton	W 79–56	6–3	Watsco Center (983); Coral Gables, FL
December 20, 2019*; 12:00 p.m., ACCNX		UNC Asheville; Miami Holiday Classic	W 75–46	7–3	Watsco Center (733); Coral Gables, FL
December 21, 2019*; 11:00 a.m., ACCNX		Washington State; Miami Holiday Classic	W 74–68	8–3	Watsco Center (782); Coral Gables, FL
ACC regular season
December 29, 2019; 2:00 p.m., ACCN	No. 24	Wake Forest	W 59–56	9–3 (1–0)	Watsco Center (988); Coral Gables, FL
January 2, 2020; 7:00 p.m., ACCNX	No. 23	at Georgia Tech	L 54–61	9–4 (1–1)	McCamish Pavilion (1,235); Atlanta, GA
January 5, 2020; 2:00 p.m., RSN	No. 23	No. 8 Florida State	L 62–73	9–5 (1–2)	Watsco Center (1,984); Coral Gables, FL
January 9, 2020; 8:00 p.m., ACCN		No. 7 Louisville	L 41–87	9–6 (1–3)	Watsco Center (930); Coral Gables, FL
January 12, 2020; 12:00 p.m., ACCN		Syracuse	W 77–62	10–6 (2–3)	Watsco Center (951); Coral Gables, FL
January 16, 2020; 6:00 p.m., ACCNX		at North Carolina	L 58–78	10–7 (2–4)	Carmichael Arena (1,535); Chapel Hill, NC
January 19, 2020; 1:00 p.m., ACCN		Notre Dame	L 53–76	10–8 (2–5)	Edmund P. Joyce Center (8,059); Notre Dame, IN
January 23, 2020; 6:00 p.m., ACCN		Clemson	W 68–64	11–8 (3–5)	Watsco Center (1,316); Coral Gables, FL
January 26, 2020; 2:00 p.m., ACCN		at No. 14 Florida State	L 61–79	11–9 (3–6)	Donald L. Tucker Center (4,569); Tallahassee, FL
January 30, 2020; 6:00 p.m., ACCN		Georgia Tech	W 54–49 ^{OT}	12–9 (4–6)	Watsco Center (847); Coral Gables, FL
February 2, 2020; 2:00 p.m., ACCNX		at Virginia Tech	L 45–69	12–10 (4–7)	Cassell Coliseum (1,629); Blacksburg, VA
February 9, 2020; 2:00 p.m., ACCN		Duke	L 55–74	12–11 (4–8)	Watsco Center (1,435); Coral Gables, FL
February 13, 2020; 7:00 p.m., ACCNX		at Virginia	L 64–69	12–12 (4–9)	John Paul Jones Arena (2,351); Charlottesville, VA
February 16, 2020; 1:00 p.m., ACCN		at Clemson	W 63–48	13–12 (5–9)	Littlejohn Coliseum (1,384); Clemson, SC
February 20, 2020; 8:00 p.m., ACCN		No. 10 NC State	L 48–50	13–13 (5–10)	Watsco Center (1,402); Coral Gables, FL
February 23, 2020; 4:00 p.m., RSN		at Boston College	L 64–75	13–14 (5–11)	Conte Forum (1,356); Chestnut Hill, MA
February 27, 2020; 7:00 p.m., ACCNX		at Wake Forest	W 79–63	14–14 (6–11)	LJVM Coliseum (833); Winston-Salem, NC
March 1, 2020; 3:00 p.m., ACCNX		Pittsburgh	W 73–54	15–14 (7–11)	Watsco Center (1,214); Coral Gables, FL
ACC Women's Tournament
March 4, 2020; 6:30 p.m., RSN	(11)	vs. (14) Clemson; First round	L 56–71	15–15	Greensboro Coliseum (2,795); Greensboro, NC
*Non-conference game. ^{#}Rankings from AP Poll. (#) Tournament seedings in parentheses. All times are in Eastern.

== Rankings ==
Regular season polls
Poll	Pre- Season	Week 2	Week 3	Week 4	Week 5	Week 6	Week 7	Week 8	Week 9	Week 10	Week 11	Week 12	Week 13	Week 14	Week 15	Week 16	Week 17	Week 18	Week 19	Final
AP	19т	17	16	19	21	25	RV	24	23	RV										N/A
Coaches	19	17	18	22	RV		RV	RV												

Legend
	Increase in ranking
	Decrease in ranking
	Not ranked previous week
(RV)	Received Votes

The Coaches Poll releases a final poll after the NCAA tournament, but the AP Poll does not release a poll at this time.
