= 2019–20 Syracuse Orange women's basketball team =

Intercollegiate basketball season

2019–20 Syracuse Orange women's basketball
- Conference: Atlantic Coast Conference
- Record: 16–15 (9–9 ACC)
- Head coach: Quentin Hillsman (13th season)
- Assistant coaches: Vonn Read; Cedric Solice; DeLisha Milton-Jones
- Home arena: Carrier Dome

2019–20 ACC women's basketball standings
	Conf.				Overall
Team	W		L	PCT	W		L	PCT
No. 6 Louisville	16	–	2	.889	28	–	4	.875
No. 8 NC State†	14	–	4	.778	28	–	4	.875
Duke	12	–	6	.667	18	–	12	.600
No. 18 Florida State	11	–	7	.611	24	–	8	.750
Virginia Tech	11	–	7	.611	21	–	9	.700
Boston College	11	–	7	.611	20	–	12	.625
Georgia Tech	10	–	8	.556	20	–	11	.645
Syracuse	9	–	9	.500	16	–	15	.516
Virginia	8	–	10	.444	13	–	17	.433
Notre Dame	8	–	10	.444	13	–	18	.419
Miami (FL)	7	–	11	.389	15	–	15	.500
North Carolina	7	–	11	.389	16	–	14	.533
Wake Forest	7	–	11	.389	16	–	16	.500
Clemson	3	–	15	.167	8	–	23	.258
Pittsburgh	1	–	17	.056	5	–	26	.161
† 2020 ACC tournament winner As of March 5, 2020; Rankings from AP poll

The 2019–20 Syracuse Orange women's basketball team represented Syracuse University during the 2019–20 NCAA Division I women's basketball season. The Orange were led by thirteenth year head coach Quentin Hillsman. The Orange were seventh year members of the Atlantic Coast Conference and played their home games at the Carrier Dome.

The Orange finished the season 16–15 and 9–9 in ACC play to finish in eighth place. As the eighth seed in the ACC tournament, they defeated Virginia in the Second Round before losing to Louisville in Quarterfinals. The NCAA tournament and WNIT were cancelled due to the COVID-19 outbreak.

== Previous season ==
For the 2018–19 season, the Orange finished 11–5 in ACC play and 25–9 overall. Their record achieved fifth place in the ACC. Syracuse was eliminated in the semifinals of the ACC women's tournament by Notre Dame. They received an at-large bid to the NCAA women's tournament, receiving a three seed in the Portland regional, where they defeated Fordham in the first round before being upset by South Dakota State in the second round.

== Off-season ==
=== Recruiting class ===
College recruiting information
Name	Hometown	School	Height	Weight	Commit date
Alisha Lewis; PG	Wallingford, Pennsylvania	Strath Haven High School	5 ft 6 in (1.68 m)	N/A	
Alisha Lewis; PG	Recruit ratings: ESPN: (97)				
Teisha Hyman; PG	White Plains, New York	Woodlands	5 ft 8 in (1.73 m)	N/A	
Teisha Hyman; PG	Recruit ratings: ESPN: (92)				
Oceanne Montpierre; PG	France	Ropazu	5 ft 7 in (1.70 m)	N/A	
Oceanne Montpierre; PG	Recruit ratings: ESPN: (90)				
Overall recruit ranking:
Note: In many cases, Scout, Rivals, 247Sports, On3, and ESPN may conflict in their listings of height and weight.; In these cases, the average was taken. ESPN grades are on a 100-point scale.; Sources:

== Roster ==
2019–20 Syracuse Orange women's basketball team
Players
Coaches

Pos.	#	Name	Height	Year	Previous school	Hometown
G	0	Elemy Colomé	5 ft 8 in (1.73 m)	GS	Proctor Academy; Morgan State	Lawrence, MA
G	1	Taleah Washington	5 ft 7 in (1.7 m)	Fr	Rock Creek Christian Academy	District Heights, MD
F	2	Whisper Fisher	6 ft 2 in (1.88 m)	GS	Owings Mills	Owings Mills, MD
F	3	Maeva Djaldi–Tabdi	6 ft 2 in (1.88 m)	RS So	Jean Moulin	Paris, France
G	4	Tiana Mangakahia	5 ft 6 in (1.68 m)	Sr	Lake Ginninderra	Meadowbrook, QLD, Australia
G	5	Teisha Hyman	5 ft 8 in (1.73 m)	Fr	Woodlands	White Plains, NY
G	10	Alisha Lewis	5 ft 7 in (1.7 m)	Fr	Strath Haven	Wallingford, PA
G	11	Gabrielle Cooper	5 ft 10 in (1.78 m)	Sr	Morgan Park	Lansing, IL
G	12	Brooke Alexander	6 ft 0 in (1.83 m)	GS	Prestonwood Christian; UT Arlington	Frisco, TX
G	21	Emily Engstler	6 ft 0 in (1.83 m)	So	St. Francis Prep	Fresh Meadows, NY
C	22	Amaya Finklea–Guity	6 ft 4 in (1.93 m)	Jr	Noble & Greenough	Dorchester, MA
G	23	Kiara Lewis	5 ft 8 in (1.73 m)	RS Jr	Whitney Young	Chicago, IL
G	25	Lauren Fitzmaurice	5 ft 8 in (1.73 m)	Jr	Liberty Bell	Mazama, WA
F	45	Digna Strautmane	6 ft 2 in (1.88 m)	Jr	Riga 66	Riga, Latvia

Head coach

- Quentin Hillsman (St. Mary's (MD))

Assistant coach(es)

- Vonn Read (Clark Atlanta)
- Cedric Solice (Charleston Southern)
- DeLisha Milton-Jones (Florida)

Legend

- (C) Team captain
- (S) Suspended
- (I) Ineligible
- (W) Walk-on
- Injured
- Current redshirt

Roster
Last update: December 4, 2019

== Schedule ==
Date time, TV	Rank^{#}	Opponent^{#}	Result	Record	Site (attendance) city, state
Non-conference regular season
November 5, 2019*; 8:00 p.m., ACCNX	No. 21	Ohio	W 66–54	1–0	Carrier Dome (1,297); Syracuse, NY
November 12, 2019*; 8:00 p.m., ACCNX	No. 20	Maryland Eastern Shore	W 65–50	2–0	Carrier Dome (1,223); Syracuse, NY
November 16, 2019*; 1:00 p.m., ACCNX	No. 20	Albany	W 75–52	3–0	Carrier Dome (1,421); Syracuse, NY
November 24, 2019*; 4:00 p.m., ACCN	No. 17	No. 1 Oregon	L 64–81	3–1	Carrier Dome (3,091); Syracuse, NY
November 28, 2019*; 8:00 p.m.	No. 18	vs. Houston; Greater Victoria Invitational	W 87–62	4–1	CARSA Performance Gym (907); Victoria, BC
November 29, 2019*; 7:30 p.m.	No. 18	vs. No. 3 Stanford; Greater Victoria Invitational	L 59–77	4–2	CARSA Performance Gym (1,014); Victoria, BC
November 30, 2019*; 8:00 p.m.	No. 18	vs. Green Bay; Greater Victoria Invitational	L 73–79 ^{OT}	4–3	CARSA Performance Gym (1,224); Victoria, BC
December 5, 2019*; 9:00 p.m., ESPN		at No. 24 Michigan; ACC–Big Ten Women's Challenge	L 76–84 ^{OT}	4–4	Crisler Center (1,832); Ann Arbor, MI
December 8, 2019*; 2:00 p.m., ACCNX		UMBC	W 82–48	5–4	Carrier Dome (771); Syracuse, NY
December 20, 2019*; 1:30 p.m., FloHoops		vs. No. 19 Michigan State; Florida Sunshine Classic	W 77–63	6–4	Alfond Sports Center (214); Orlando, FL
December 22, 2019*; 1:30 p.m., FloHoops		vs. No. 22 West Virginia; Florida Sunshine Classic	L 69–71	6–5	Alfond Sports Center (274); Orlando, FL
ACC regular season
December 29, 2019; 2:00 p.m., ESPN2		at No. 7 Louisville	L 58–62	6–6 (0–1)	KFC Yum! Center (10,084); Louisville, KY
January 2, 2020; 8:00 p.m., ACCN		No. 8 Florida State	W 90–89 ^{OT}	7–6 (1–1)	Carrier Dome (1,489); Syracuse, NY
January 5, 2020; 4:00 p.m., ACCN		Notre Dame	W 74–63 ^{OT}	8–6 (2–1)	Carrier Dome (4,306); Syracuse, NY
January 12, 2020; 12:00 p.m., ACCN		at Miami (FL)	L 62–77	8–7 (2–2)	Watsco Center (951); Coral Gables, FL
January 16, 2020; 7:30 p.m., ACCNX		Georgia Tech	L 64–82	8–8 (2–3)	Carrier Dome (1,720); Syracuse, NY
January 19, 2020; 7:30 p.m., RSN		at Pittsburgh	W 69–51	9–8 (3–3)	Petersen Events Center (1,364); Pittsburgh, PA
January 23, 2020; 8:00 p.m., ACCN		Duke	L 58–88	9–9 (3–4)	Carrier Dome (2,106); Syracuse, NY
January 26, 2020; 4:00 p.m., ACCNX		at Wake Forest	L 60–65	9–10 (3–5)	LJVM Coliseum (1,711); Winston-Salem, NC
January 30, 2020; 8:00 p.m., ACCN		Virginia Tech	W 67–65	10–10 (4–5)	Carrier Dome (1,096); Syracuse, NY
February 2, 2020; 2:00 p.m., ACCNX		at Virginia	L 41–57	10–11 (4–6)	John Paul Jones Arena (2,649); Charlottesville, VA
February 6, 2020; 7:00 p.m., ACCNX		at Boston College	W 89–79	11–11 (5–6)	Conte Forum (1,676); Chestnut Hill, MA
February 9, 2020; 2:00 p.m., ESPN2		No. 5 Louisville	W 59–51	12–11 (6–6)	Carrier Dome (2,894); Syracuse, NY
February 13, 2020; 7:00 p.m., RSN		at North Carolina	W 74–56	13–11 (7–6)	Carmichael Arena (1,564); Chapel Hill, NC
February 16, 2020; 1:00 p.m., RSN		Pittsburgh	W 71–53	14–11 (8–6)	Carrier Dome (3,237); Syracuse, NY
February 20, 2020; 6:00 p.m., ACCN		Clemson	W 59–46	15–11 (9–6)	Carrier Dome (1,592); Syracuse, NY
February 23, 2020; 12:00 p.m., ACCN		at Notre Dame	L 70–72	15–12 (9–7)	Edmund P. Joyce Center (8,086); Notre Dame, IN
February 27, 2020; 8:00 p.m., ACCN		at No. 8 NC State	L 60–69	15–13 (9–8)	Reynolds Coliseum (3,779); Raleigh, NC
March 1, 2020; 4:00 p.m., RSN		Boston College	L 81–88	15–14 (9–9)	Carrier Dome (3,410); Syracuse, NY
ACC Women's Tournament
March 5, 2020; 2:00 p.m., RSN	(8)	vs. (9) Virginia; Second round	W 67–50	16–14	Greensboro Coliseum (2,781); Greensboro, NC
March 6, 2020; 2:00 p.m., RSN	(8)	vs. (1) No. 4 Louisville; Quarterfinals	L 46–71	16–15	Greensboro Coliseum (3,811); Greensboro, NC
*Non-conference game. ^{#}Rankings from AP Poll. (#) Tournament seedings in parentheses. All times are in Eastern.

== Rankings ==
Regular season polls
Poll	Pre- Season	Week 2	Week 3	Week 4	Week 5	Week 6	Week 7	Week 8	Week 9	Week 10	Week 11	Week 12	Week 13	Week 14	Week 15	Week 16	Week 17	Week 18	Week 19	Final
AP	21	20	17	18	RV					RV										N/A
Coaches	17	15	16	RV					RV											

Legend
	Increase in ranking
	Decrease in ranking
	Not ranked previous week
(RV)	Received Votes

The Coaches Poll releases a final poll after the NCAA tournament, but the AP Poll does not release a poll at this time.

== See also ==
- 2019–20 Syracuse Orange men's basketball team
