= 2019–20 Wake Forest Demon Deacons women's basketball team =

Intercollegiate basketball season

2019–20 Wake Forest Demon Deacons women's basketball
- Conference: Atlantic Coast Conference
- Record: 16–16 (7–11 ACC)
- Head coach: Jen Hoover (8th season)
- Assistant coaches: Jermaine Woods; Melissa D'Amico; Dane Sparrow
- Home arena: LJVM Coliseum

2019–20 ACC women's basketball standings
	Conf.				Overall
Team	W		L	PCT	W		L	PCT
No. 6 Louisville	16	–	2	.889	28	–	4	.875
No. 8 NC State†	14	–	4	.778	28	–	4	.875
Duke	12	–	6	.667	18	–	12	.600
No. 18 Florida State	11	–	7	.611	24	–	8	.750
Virginia Tech	11	–	7	.611	21	–	9	.700
Boston College	11	–	7	.611	20	–	12	.625
Georgia Tech	10	–	8	.556	20	–	11	.645
Syracuse	9	–	9	.500	16	–	15	.516
Virginia	8	–	10	.444	13	–	17	.433
Notre Dame	8	–	10	.444	13	–	18	.419
Miami (FL)	7	–	11	.389	15	–	15	.500
North Carolina	7	–	11	.389	16	–	14	.533
Wake Forest	7	–	11	.389	16	–	16	.500
Clemson	3	–	15	.167	8	–	23	.258
Pittsburgh	1	–	17	.056	5	–	26	.161
† 2020 ACC tournament winner As of March 5, 2020; Rankings from AP poll

The 2019–20 Wake Forest Demon Deacons women's basketball team represented Wake Forest University during the 2019–20 NCAA Division I women's basketball season. The Demon Deacons, led by eighth-year head coach Jen Hoover, were members of the Atlantic Coast Conference and played their home games at the Lawrence Joel Veterans Memorial Coliseum.

The Demon Deacons finished the season 16–16 and 7–11 in ACC play to finish in a tie for eleventh place. As the thirteenth seed in the ACC tournament, they defeated North Carolina in the first round and Virginia Tech in the second round before losing to Florida State in the quarterfinals. The NCAA tournament and WNIT were cancelled due to the COVID-19 outbreak.

== Previous season ==
The Demon Deacons finished the season 10–20, 1–15 in ACC play to finish in last place. They lost in the first round of the ACC women's tournament to Virginia Tech. The Demon Deacons were not invited to a post-season tournament.

== Off-season ==
=== Recruiting class ===
College recruiting
Name	Hometown	School	Height	Weight	Commit date
Alexandria Scruggs; G	Fayetteville, NC	E. E. Smith High School	5 ft 9 in (1.75 m)	N/A	
Alexandria Scruggs; G	Recruit ratings: ESPN: (93)				
Kaia Harrison; PG	Baldwin, New York	Baldwin Senior High	5 ft 6 in (1.68 m)	N/A	
Kaia Harrison; PG	Recruit ratings: ESPN: (90)				
Anaia Hoard; G	Carnon, France	Wesleyan Christian Academy	5 ft 11 in (1.80 m)	N/A	
Anaia Hoard; G	Recruit ratings: ESPN: (90)				
Olivia Summiel; F	Dayville, Connecticut	Marianapolis Prep	6 ft 1 in (1.85 m)	N/A	
Olivia Summiel; F	Recruit ratings: ESPN: (89)				
Overall recruit ranking:
Note: In many cases, Scout, Rivals, 247Sports, On3, and ESPN may conflict in their listings of height and weight.; In these cases, the average was taken. ESPN grades are on a 100-point scale.; Sources:

== Roster ==
2019–20 Wake Forest Demon Deacons women's basketball team
Players
Coaches

Pos.	#	Name	Height	Year	Previous school	Hometown
F	0	Maya Banks	6 ft 4 in (1.93 m)	Jr	Hamilton	Chandler, AZ
G	1	Anaia Hoard	5 ft 7 in (1.7 m)	Fr	Wesleyan Christian Academy	Carnon, France
G	2	Kaia Harrison	5 ft 7 in (1.7 m)	Fr	Baldwin	Baldwin, NY
G	3	Mack Maier	5 ft 10 in (1.78 m)	Fr	Chaparral	Parker, CO
G	5	Gina Conti	5 ft 10 in (1.78 m)	Jr	Grove City	Grove City, OH
G	11	Ellen Hahne	5 ft 11 in (1.8 m)	So	Riksbasketgymansiet Luleå	Stockholm, Sweden
F	11	Ivana Raca	6 ft 2 in (1.88 m)	Jr	1st Lyceum of Voula	Belgrade, Serbia
G	12	Kaylen Dickson	5 ft 11 in (1.8 m)	So	Warren Township	Gurnee, IL
G	14	Alex Sharp	6 ft 1 in (1.85 m)	Sr	Australian Institute of Sport	Melbourne, Australia
F	20	Olivia Summiel	6 ft 2 in (1.88 m)	Fr	Marianapolis Prep	Dayville, CT
F	21	Raegyn Branch	6 ft 2 in (1.88 m)	Sr	Arlington	Arlington, TN
F	23	Christina Morra	6 ft 2 in (1.88 m)	So	King's Christian Collegiate	Toronto, Canada
G	32	Alexandria Scruggs	5 ft 10 in (1.78 m)	Fr	E. E. Smith	Fayetteville, NC
F	44	Ona Udoh	6 ft 1 in (1.85 m)	Jr	Terry Sanford	Fayetteville, NC

Head coach

- Jen Hoover (Wake Forest)

Assistant coach(es)

- Melissa D'Amico (Notre Dame)
- Jermaine Woods (Christopher Newport)
- Dane Sparrow (UNC Greensboro)

Legend

- (C) Team captain
- (S) Suspended
- (I) Ineligible
- (W) Walk-on
- Injured
- Current redshirt

Roster
Last update: December 5, 2019

== Schedule ==
Date time, TV	Rank^{#}	Opponent^{#}	Result	Record	Site (attendance) city, state
Non-conference regular season
November 5, 2019*; 7:00 p.m., WatchESPN		UNC Wilmington	W 65–55	1–0	LJVM Coliseum (535); Winston–Salem, NC
November 8, 2019*; 7:00 p.m., WatchESPN		College of Charleston	W 106–50	2–0	LJVM Coliseum (630); Winston–Salem, NC
November 10, 2019*; 5:00 p.m.		UNC Greensboro	L 65–67	2–1	LJVM Coliseum (725); Winston–Salem, NC
November 15, 2019*; 5:00 p.m.		Charlotte	L 65–77	2–2	LJVM Coliseum (697); Winston–Salem, NC
November 22, 2019*; 7:30 p.m., ESPN3		at St. John's	L 74–82	2–3	Carnesecca Arena (841); New York, NY
November 25, 2019*; 7:00 p.m.		at Elon	W 69–57	3–3	Schar Center (481); Elon, NC
November 30, 2019*; 1:00 p.m., ACCNX		East Carolina	W 76–53	4–3	LJVM Coliseum (430); Winston–Salem, NC
December 5, 2019*; 7:00 p.m.		at East Tennessee State	L 60–67	4–4	J. Madison Brooks Gymnasium (758); Johnson City, TN
December 16, 2019*; 11:00 a.m., ACCNX		Campbell	W 74–46	5–4	LJVM Coliseum (9,121); Winston–Salem, NC
December 20, 2019*; 1:30 p.m.		vs. Dayton; West Palm Beach Invitational	W 78–59	6–4	Student Life Center (175); West Palm Beach, FL
December 21, 2019*; 12:15 p.m.		vs. Florida; West Palm Beach Invitational	W 73–68	7–4	Student Life Center (200); West Palm Beach, FL
ACC regular season
December 29, 2019; 2:00 p.m, ACCN		at No. 24 Miami (FL)	L 56–59	7–5 (0–1)	Watsco Center (988); Coral Gables, FL
January 2, 2020; 6:00 p.m, ACCNX		at Duke	W 60–58	8–5 (1–1)	Cameron Indoor Stadium (3,416); Durham, NC
January 5, 2020; 12:00 p.m, ACCNX		Georgia Tech	W 65–60	9–5 (2–1)	LJVM Coliseum (863); Winston–Salem, NC
January 9, 2020; 7:00 p.m, ACCNX		Clemson	W 63–58	10–5 (3–1)	LJVM Coliseum (737); Winston–Salem, NC
January 12, 2020; 2:00 p.m, ACCNX		at No. 7 Louisville	L 61–75	10–6 (3–2)	KFC Yum! Center (9,414); Louisville, KY
January 16, 2020; 7:00 p.m, ACCNX		Virginia	W 62–56	11–6 (4–2)	LJVM Coliseum (776); Winston–Salem, NC
January 19, 2020; 2:00 p.m, RSN		at No. 9 NC State	L 45–59	11–7 (4–3)	Reynolds Coliseum (5,052); Raleigh, NC
January 23, 2020; 7:00 p.m, ACCNX		No. 14 Florida State	L 65–70	11–8 (4–4)	LJVM Coliseum (688); Winston–Salem, NC
January 26, 2020; 4:00 p.m, ACCNX		Syracuse	W 65–60	12–8 (5–4)	LJVM Coliseum (1,171); Winston–Salem, NC
January 30, 2020; 7:00 p.m, ACCNX		at Pittsburgh	L 48–53	12–9 (5–5)	Petersen Events Center (813); Pittsburgh, PA
February 2, 2020; 1:00 p.m, ACCNX		at Boston College	L 54–67	12–10 (5–6)	Conte Forum (1,312); Chestnut Hill, MA
February 6, 2020; 7:00 p.m, ACCNX		Notre Dame	L 71–75	12–11 (5–7)	LJVM Coliseum (760); Winston–Salem, NC
February 9, 2020; 2:00 p.m, ACCNX		at Georgia Tech	L 52–62	12–12 (5–8)	McCamish Pavilion (1,578); Atlanta, GA
February 13, 2020; 7:00 p.m, ACCNX		at Clemson	W 66–52	13–12 (6–8)	Littlejohn Coliseum (1,197); Clemson, SC
February 16, 2020; 1:00 p.m, ACCNX		Virginia Tech	L 62–73	13–13 (6–9)	LJVM Coliseum (1,509); Winston–Salem, NC
February 20, 2020; 7:00 p.m, ACCNX		at No. 17 Florida State	L 67–78	13–14 (6–10)	Donald L. Tucker Center (2,771); Tallahassee, FL
February 23, 2020; 12:00 p.m, RSN		North Carolina	W 82–79 ^{OT}	14–14 (7–10)	LJVM Coliseum (1,520); Winston–Salem, NC
February 27, 2020; 7:00 p.m, ACCNX		Miami (FL)	L 63–79	14–15 (7–11)	LJVM Coliseum (833); Winston–Salem, NC
ACC Women's Tournament
March 4, 2020; 1:00 p.m., RSN	(13)	vs. (12) North Carolina; First round	W 83–73	15–15	Greensboro Coliseum (2,795); Greensboro, NC
March 5, 2020; 11:00 a.m., RSN	(13)	vs. (5) Virginia Tech; Second round	W 58–55	16–15	Greensboro Coliseum (6,357); Greensboro, NC
March 6, 2020; 11:00 a.m., RSN	(13)	vs. (4) No. 22 Florida State; Quarterfinals	L 47–76	16–16	Greensboro Coliseum (10,030); Greensboro, NC
*Non-conference game. ^{#}Rankings from AP Poll. (#) Tournament seedings in parentheses. All times are in Eastern.

== See also ==
- 2019–20 Wake Forest Demon Deacons men's basketball team
