= 2019–20 Pittsburgh Panthers women's basketball team =

Intercollegiate basketball season

2019–20 Pittsburgh Panthers women's basketball
- Conference: Atlantic Coast Conference
- Record: 5–26 (1–17 ACC)
- Head coach: Lance White (2nd season)
- Assistant coaches: Terri Mitchell; Josh Petersen; Bridgette Mitchell
- Home arena: Petersen Events Center

2019–20 ACC women's basketball standings
	Conf.				Overall
Team	W		L	PCT	W		L	PCT
No. 6 Louisville	16	–	2	.889	28	–	4	.875
No. 8 NC State†	14	–	4	.778	28	–	4	.875
Duke	12	–	6	.667	18	–	12	.600
No. 18 Florida State	11	–	7	.611	24	–	8	.750
Virginia Tech	11	–	7	.611	21	–	9	.700
Boston College	11	–	7	.611	20	–	12	.625
Georgia Tech	10	–	8	.556	20	–	11	.645
Syracuse	9	–	9	.500	16	–	15	.516
Virginia	8	–	10	.444	13	–	17	.433
Notre Dame	8	–	10	.444	13	–	18	.419
Miami (FL)	7	–	11	.389	15	–	15	.500
North Carolina	7	–	11	.389	16	–	14	.533
Wake Forest	7	–	11	.389	16	–	16	.500
Clemson	3	–	15	.167	8	–	23	.258
Pittsburgh	1	–	17	.056	5	–	26	.161
† 2020 ACC tournament winner As of March 5, 2020; Rankings from AP poll

The 2019–20 Pittsburgh Panthers women's basketball team represented the University of Pittsburgh during the 2019–20 NCAA Division I women's basketball season. The Panthers, led by second-year head coach Lance White, played their home games at the Petersen Events Center as members of the Atlantic Coast Conference.

The Panthers finished the season 5–26 and 1–17 in ACC play to finish in fifteenth place. As the fifteenth seed in the ACC tournament, they defeated Notre Dame in the first round before losing to Georgia Tech in the second round. The NCAA tournament and WNIT were cancelled due to the COVID-19 outbreak.

== Previous season ==
They finished the season 11–20, 2–14 in ACC play to finish in fourteenth place. They lost in the first round of the ACC women's tournament to Duke. The Panthers were not invited to post-season play.

== Off-season ==
=== Recruiting class ===
College recruiting
Name	Hometown	School	Height	Weight	Commit date
Amber Brown; G	Monroe, Louisiana	Little Rock Christian Academy	6 ft 0 in (1.83 m)	N/A	
Amber Brown; G	Recruit ratings: ESPN: (90)				
Emy Hayford; G	Maastricht, Netherlands	Caland Lyceum	5 ft 9 in (1.75 m)	N/A	
Emy Hayford; G	Recruit ratings: ESPN: (90)				
Rita Igbokwe; F	Jonesboro, Georgia	Mundy's Mill High School	6 ft 3 in (1.91 m)	N/A	
Rita Igbokwe; F	Recruit ratings: ESPN: (90)				
Dayshanette Harris; PG	Youngstown, Ohio	Ursuline High School	5 ft 7 in (1.70 m)	N/A	
Dayshanette Harris; PG	Recruit ratings: ESPN: (89)				
Overall recruit ranking:
Note: In many cases, Scout, Rivals, 247Sports, On3, and ESPN may conflict in their listings of height and weight.; In these cases, the average was taken. ESPN grades are on a 100-point scale.; Sources:

== Roster ==
2019–20 Pittsburgh Panthers women's basketball team
Players
Coaches

Pos.	#	Name	Height	Year	Previous school	Hometown
G	0	Jahsyni Knight	5 ft 8 in (1.73 m)	So	Rutgers Prep	Perth Amboy, NJ
G	1	Dayshanette Harris	5 ft 7 in (1.7 m)	Fr	Ursuline	Youngstown, OH
G	2	Aysia Bugg	5 ft 7 in (1.7 m)	RS Sr	Bolingbrook	Chicago, IL
G	4	Emy Hayford	5 ft 8 in (1.73 m)	Fr	Caland Lyceum	Maastricht, Netherlands
G	5	Amber Brown	6 ft 0 in (1.83 m)	Fr	Little Rock Christian Academy	Monroe, LA
G	10	Ismini Prapa	5 ft 7 in (1.7 m)	So	American Community School of Athens	Athens, Greece
C	11	Cara Judkins	6 ft 2 in (1.88 m)	Jr	Our Lady of Good Counsel	Bethesda, MD
G	12	Gabbie Green	5 ft 7 in (1.7 m)	Jr	Bellville	Bellville, TX
G	13	Kyla Nelson	5 ft 11 in (1.8 m)	Jr	Oaklands	Worthing, England
F	14	Cynthia Ezeja	6 ft 3 in (1.91 m)	Fr	20th High School of Athens	Athens, Greece
C	21	Marcella LaMark	6 ft 4 in (1.93 m)	Jr	Divino Salvador; Texas Tech	São Paulo, Brazil
F	23	Rita Igbokwe	6 ft 4 in (1.93 m)	Fr	Mundy's Mill	Jonesboro, GA

Head coach

- Lance White (Texas Tech)

Assistant coach(es)

- Terri Mitchell (Duquesne)
- Josh Petersen (Florida State)
- Bridgette Mitchell (Duke)

Legend

- (C) Team captain
- (S) Suspended
- (I) Ineligible
- (W) Walk-on
- Injured
- Current redshirt

Roster
Last update: December 6, 2019

== Schedule ==
Date time, TV	Rank^{#}	Opponent^{#}	Result	Record	Site (attendance) city, state
Non-conference regular season
November 6, 2019*; 11:00 a.m.		at UCF	L 58–73	0–1	CFE Arena (6,973); Orlando, FL
November 11, 2019*; 7:00 p.m.		Central Connecticut	W 81–73	1–1	Peterson Events Center (572); Pittsburgh, PA
November 16, 2019*; 2:00 p.m.		Georgetown	L 56–66	1–2	Peterson Events Center (657); Pittsburgh, PA
November 19, 2019*; 11:00 a.m.		Fairleigh Dickinson	W 69–60	2–2	Peterson Events Center (6,730); Pittsburgh, PA
November 23, 2019*; 2:00 p.m.		Duquesne; City Game	L 62–81	2–3	Peterson Events Center (1,182); Pittsburgh, PA
November 29, 2019*; 3:30 p.m.		vs. Ohio; Daytona Beach Invitational	L 50–72	2–4	Ocean Center (263); Daytona Beach, FL
November 30, 2019*; 5:45 p.m.		vs. Ole Miss; Daytona Beach Invitational	W 58–50	3–4	Ocean Center (97); Daytona Beach, FL
December 5, 2019*; 7:00 p.m.		at Penn State; ACC–Big Ten Women's Challenge	L 73–78	3–5	Bryce Jordan Center (1,667); University Park, PA
December 8, 2019*; 2:00 p.m., ACCNX		Stony Brook	L 56–59	3–6	Peterson Events Center (1,149); Pittsburgh, PA
December 17, 2019*; 6:30 p.m., ACCN		Miami (OH)	L 71–80	3–7	Peterson Events Center (894); Pittsburgh, PA
December 21, 2019*; 2:00 p.m.		at Cincinnati	L 53–69	3–8	Fifth Third Arena (886); Cincinnati, OH
ACC regular season
December 30, 2019; 2:00 p.m., RSN		at North Carolina	L 62–70	3–9 (0–1)	Carmichael Arena (1,852); Chapel Hill, NC
January 2, 2020; 7:00 p.m., ACCNX		Notre Dame	L 52–60	3–10 (0–2)	Peterson Events Center (1,368); Pittsburgh, PA
January 5, 2020; 2:00 p.m., ACCNX		Boston College	L 70–79	3–11 (0–3)	Peterson Events Center (3,791); Pittsburgh, PA
January 9, 2020; 7:00 p.m., ACCNX		at Virginia Tech	L 56–68	3–12 (0–4)	Cassell Coliseum (1,332); Blacksburg, VA
January 16, 2020; 7:00 p.m., ACCNX		at Clemson	L 67–75 ^{OT}	3–13 (0–5)	Littlejohn Coliseum (1,329); Clemson, SC
January 19, 2020; 12:00 p.m., RSN		Syracuse	L 51–69	3–14 (0–6)	Peterson Events Center (1,364); Pittsburgh, PA
January 23, 2020; 7:00 p.m., ACCNX		No. 8 NC State	L 44–88	3–15 (0–7)	Peterson Events Center (832); Pittsburgh, PA
January 26, 2020; 4:00 p.m., ACCN		at No. 5 Louisville	L 49–83	3–16 (0–8)	KFC Yum! Center (11,624); Louisville, KY
January 30, 2020; 7:00 p.m., ACCNX		Wake Forest	W 53–48	4–16 (1–8)	Peterson Events Center (813); Pittsburgh, PA
February 1, 2020; 5:00 p.m., ACCNX		No. 14 Florida State	L 41–66	4–17 (1–9)	Peterson Events Center (2,352); Pittsburgh, PA
February 6, 2020; 7:00 p.m., ACCNX		Georgia Tech	L 48–77	4–18 (1–10)	Peterson Events Center (591); Pittsburgh, PA
February 9, 2020; 4:00 p.m., ACCN		at Notre Dame	L 52–74	4–19 (1–11)	Edmund P. Joyce Center (7,916); Notre Dame, IN
February 13, 2020; 6:00 p.m., ACCN		Duke	L 56–73	4–20 (1–12)	Peterson Events Center (876); Pittsburgh, PA
February 16, 2020; 1:00 p.m., RSN		at Syracuse	L 53–71	4–21 (1–13)	Carrier Dome (3,237); Syracuse, NY
February 20, 2020; 7:00 p.m., ACCNX		at Boston College	L 59–70	4–22 (1–14)	Conte Forum (1,289); Chestnut Hill, MA
February 23, 2020; 2:00 p.m., ACCNX		No. 5 Louisville	L 47–79	4–23 (1–15)	Peterson Events Center (2,391); Pittsburgh, PA
February 27, 2020; 7:00 p.m., ACCNX		at Virginia	L 55–66	4–24 (1–16)	John Paul Jones Arena (2,211); Charlottesville, VA
March 1, 2020; 3:00 p.m., ACCNX		at Miami (FL)	L 54–73	4–25 (1–17)	Watsco Center (1,214); Coral Gables, FL
ACC Women's Tournament
March 4, 2020; 3:30 p.m., RSN	(15)	vs. (10) Notre Dame; First Round	W 67–65	5–25	Greensboro Coliseum (2,795); Greensboro, NC
March 5, 2020; 6:00 p.m., RSN	(15)	vs. (7) Georgia Tech; Second Round	L 58–68	5–26	Greensboro Coliseum (3,638); Greensboro, NC
*Non-conference game. ^{#}Rankings from AP Poll. (#) Tournament seedings in parentheses. All times are in Eastern.
