= 2019–20 Boston College Eagles women's basketball team =

Intercollegiate basketball season

2019–20 Boston College Eagles women's basketball
- Conference: Atlantic Coast Conference

Ranking
- AP: No. RV
- Record: 20–12 (11–7 ACC)
- Head coach: Joanna Bernabei-McNamee (2nd season)
- Assistant coaches: Yolanda Griffith; AJ Cohen; George Porcha
- Home arena: Conte Forum

2019–20 ACC women's basketball standings
	Conf.				Overall
Team	W		L	PCT	W		L	PCT
No. 6 Louisville	16	–	2	.889	28	–	4	.875
No. 8 NC State†	14	–	4	.778	28	–	4	.875
Duke	12	–	6	.667	18	–	12	.600
No. 18 Florida State	11	–	7	.611	24	–	8	.750
Virginia Tech	11	–	7	.611	21	–	9	.700
Boston College	11	–	7	.611	20	–	12	.625
Georgia Tech	10	–	8	.556	20	–	11	.645
Syracuse	9	–	9	.500	16	–	15	.516
Virginia	8	–	10	.444	13	–	17	.433
Notre Dame	8	–	10	.444	13	–	18	.419
Miami (FL)	7	–	11	.389	15	–	15	.500
North Carolina	7	–	11	.389	16	–	14	.533
Wake Forest	7	–	11	.389	16	–	16	.500
Clemson	3	–	15	.167	8	–	23	.258
Pittsburgh	1	–	17	.056	5	–	26	.161
† 2020 ACC tournament winner As of March 5, 2020; Rankings from AP poll

The 2019–20 Boston College Eagles women's basketball team represented Boston College during the 2019–20 NCAA Division I women's basketball season. The Eagles were led by second year head coach Joanna Bernabei-McNamee. They played their home games at the Conte Forum and were members of the Atlantic Coast Conference.

The Eagles finished the season 20–12 and 11–7 in ACC play to finish in a tie for fourth place. As the sixth seed in the ACC tournament, they defeated Clemson in the Second Round and Duke in the Quarterfinals before losing to eventual champion NC State in Semifinals. The NCAA tournament and WNIT were cancelled due to the COVID-19 outbreak.

== Previous season ==
They finished the season 14–16, 3–13 in ACC play to finish in thirteenth place. They lost in the first round of the ACC women's tournament to Virginia. The Eagles were not invited to any post-season tournaments.

== Off-season ==
=== Recruiting class ===
College recruiting information
Name	Hometown	School	Height	Weight	Commit date
Jaelyn Batts; G	South Riding, VA	Freedom	6 ft 0 in (1.83 m)	N/A	
Jaelyn Batts; G	Recruit ratings: ESPN: (90)				
Akunna Konkwo; P	Alexandria, VA	Bishop Ireton	6 ft 3 in (1.91 m)	N/A	
Akunna Konkwo; P	Recruit ratings: ESPN: (90)				
Overall recruit ranking:
Note: In many cases, Scout, Rivals, 247Sports, On3, and ESPN may conflict in their listings of height and weight.; In these cases, the average was taken. ESPN grades are on a 100-point scale.; Sources:

== Roster ==
2019–20 Boston College Eagles women's basketball team
Players
Coaches

Pos.	#	Name	Height	Year	Previous school	Hometown
G	1	Cameron Swartz	5 ft 11 in (1.8 m)	So	Fellowship Christian School	Marietta, GA
G	0	Jaelyn Batts	6 ft 0 in (1.83 m)	Fr	Freedom	South Riding, VA
G	4	Taylor Ortlepp	5 ft 10 in (1.78 m)	Sr	St. Ignatius College	Adelaide, Australia
F	5	Georgia Pineau	6 ft 1 in (1.85 m)	Sr	Caulfield Grammar	Victoria, Australia
G	10	Makayla Dickens	5 ft 8 in (1.73 m)	So	Princess Anne	Virginia Beach, VA
F	11	Emma Guy	6 ft 3 in (1.91 m)	Sr	Penfield	Penfield, NY
F	13	Taylor Soule	5 ft 11 in (1.8 m)	So	Kimball Union Academy	Lebanon, NH
G	14	Marnelle Garraud	5 ft 7 in (1.7 m)	So	Noble and Greenough School	Lynn, MA
G	23	Milan Bolden-Morris	5 ft 10 in (1.78 m)	Jr	Cardinal Newman	Belle Glade, FL
G	31	Sydney Lowery	5 ft 10 in (1.78 m)	Jr	St. Luke's School	Shelton, CT
C	32	Clara Ford	6 ft 3 in (1.91 m)	So	George C. Marshall	Vienna, VA
C	44	Akunna Konkwo	6 ft 2 in (1.88 m)	Fr	Bishop Ireton	Alexandria, VA

Head coach

- Joanna Bernabei-McNamee (West Liberty)

Assistant coach(es)

- Yolanda Griffith (Florida Atlantic)
- AJ Cohen (Louisville)
- George Porcha (New Haven)

Legend

- (C) Team captain
- (S) Suspended
- (I) Ineligible
- (W) Walk-on
- Injured
- Current redshirt

Roster
Last update: 2019-11-06

== Schedule ==
Date time, TV	Rank^{#}	Opponent^{#}	Result	Record	Site (attendance) city, state
Regular season
November 5, 2019*; 7:00 p.m., ACCNX		UMass Lowell	W 89–64	1–0	Conte Forum (448); Chestnut Hill, MA
November 10, 2019*; 2:00 p.m., ACCNX		St. Francis Brooklyn	W 106–69	2–0	Conte Forum (622); Chestnut Hill, MA
November 13, 2019*; 7:00 p.m., NESN+		at Holy Cross	L 71–80	2–1	Hart Center (817); Worcester, MA
November 17, 2019*; 1:00 p.m.		at Providence	L 60–76	2–2	Alumni Hall (669); Providence, RI
November 21, 2019*; 7:00 p.m., ACCNX		Rhode Island	W 66–55	3–2	Conte Forum (762); Chestnut Hill, MA
November 24, 2019*; 2:00 p.m., ACCNX		VCU	W 87–52	4–2	Conte Forum (1,528); Chestnut Hill, MA
November 27, 2019*; 1:00 p.m., FloHoops		vs. Charlotte; Puerto Rico Classico	L 68–84	4–3	Mario Morales Coliseum; San Juan, Puerto Rico
November 28, 2019*; 3:30 p.m., FloHoops		vs. Tulane; Puerto Rico Classico	W 89–76	5–3	Mario Morales Coliseum; San Juan, Puerto Rico
December 4, 2019*; 8:00 p.m.		at Northwestern; ACC–Big Ten Women's Challenge	L 63–66	5–4	Welsh–Ryan Arena (610); Evanston, IL
December 8, 2019; 2:00 p.m., ACCNX		at Duke	L 73–85	5–5 (0–1)	Cameron Indoor Stadium (3,005); Durham, NC
December 15, 2019*; 2:00 p.m., NESN		at Boston University	W 88–57	6–5	Case Gym (353); Boston, MA
December 20, 2019*; 11:00 a.m., ACCNX		Delaware State	W 109–69	7–5	Conte Forum (3,619); Chestnut Hill, MA
December 29, 2019; 12:00 p.m., ACCNX		No. 9 NC State	L 54–72	7–6 (0–2)	Conte Forum (1,323); Chestnut Hill, MA
January 5, 2020; 2:00 p.m., ACCNX		at Pittsburgh	W 79–70	8–6 (1–2)	Petersen Events Center (3,791); Pittsburgh, PA
January 9, 2020; 7:00 p.m., ACCNX		at Notre Dame	W 75–65	9–6 (2–2)	Edmund P. Joyce Center (7,487); South Bend, IN
January 12, 2020; 2:00 p.m., ACCNX		Virginia	L 52–69	9–7 (2–3)	Conte Forum (2,357); Chestnut Hill, MA
January 16, 2020; 7:00 p.m., ACCNX		No. 5 Louisville	L 70–81	9–8 (2–4)	Conte Forum (1,137); Chestnut Hill, MA
January 19, 2020; 2:00 p.m., ACCNX		at Georgia Tech	W 55–48	10–8 (3–4)	McCamish Pavilion (2,577); Atlanta, GA
January 23, 2020; 7:00 p.m., ACCNX		at Virginia Tech	L 49–70	10–9 (3–5)	Cassell Coliseum (1,428); Blacksburg, VA
January 30, 2020; 7:00 p.m., ACCNX		at No. 14 Florida State	W 65–56	11–9 (4–5)	Donald L. Tucker Civic Center (2,679); Tallahassee, FL
February 2, 2020; 1:00 p.m., ACCNX		Wake Forest	W 67–54	12–9 (5–5)	Conte Forum (1,312); Chestnut Hill, MA
February 6, 2020; 7:00 p.m., ACCNX		Syracuse	L 79–89	12–10 (5–6)	Conte Forum (1,676); Chestnut Hill, MA
February 9, 2020; 12:00 p.m., ACCRSN		at Clemson	W 70–68	13–10 (6–6)	Littlejohn Coliseum (1,437); Clemson, SC
February 13, 2020; 7:00 p.m., ACCNX		Notre Dame	W 56–55	14–10 (7–6)	Conte Forum (1,318); Chestnut Hill, MA
February 16, 2020; 12:00 p.m., ACCNX		North Carolina	W 93–75	15–10 (8–6)	Conte Forum (2,217); Chestnut Hill, MA
February 20, 2020; 7:00 p.m., ACCNX		Pittsburgh	W 70–59	16–10 (9–6)	Conte Forum (1,289); Chestnut Hill, MA
February 23, 2020; 4:00 p.m., ACCNX		at Miami (FL)	W 75–64	17–10 (10–6)	Watsco Center (1,356); Coral Gables, FL
February 27, 2020; 6:00 p.m., ACCNX		at No. 5 Louisville	L 48–68	17–11 (10–7)	KFC Yum! Center (8,514); Louisville, KY
March 1, 2020; 4:00 p.m., ACCNX		at Syracuse	W 88–81	18–11 (11–7)	Carrier Dome (3,410); Syracuse, NY
ACC Women's Tournament
March 5, 2020; 8:00 p.m., RSN	(6)	vs. (11) Clemson; Second round	W 85–73	19–11	Greensboro Coliseum (3,638); Greensboro, NC
March 6, 2020; 8:00 p.m., RSN	(6)	vs. (3) Duke; Quarterfinals	W 84–77	20–11	Greensboro Coliseum (5,492); Greensboro, NC
March 7, 2020; 2:30 p.m., ESPNU	(6)	vs. (2) No. 10 NC State; Semifinals	L 75–82	20–12	Greensboro Coliseum (6,751); Greensboro, NC
*Non-conference game. ^{#}Rankings from AP Poll. (#) Tournament seedings in parentheses. All times are in Eastern.

== Rankings ==
Regular season polls
Poll	Pre- Season	Week 2	Week 3	Week 4	Week 5	Week 6	Week 7	Week 8	Week 9	Week 10	Week 11	Week 12	Week 13	Week 14	Week 15	Week 16	Week 17	Week 18	Week 19	Final
AP																			RV	RV
Coaches																				N/A

Legend
	Increase in ranking
	Decrease in ranking
	No change
(RV)	Received votes
(NR)	Not ranked

Coaches did not release a Week 2 poll and AP does not release a final poll. Due to the cancellation of the NCAA Tournament, the coaches poll did not release a final ranking.

== See also ==
- 2019–20 Boston College Eagles men's basketball team
