= 2019–20 Florida State Seminoles women's basketball team =

Intercollegiate basketball season

2019–20 Florida State Seminoles women's basketball
- Conference: Atlantic Coast Conference

Ranking
- Coaches: No. 20
- AP: No. 18
- Record: 24–8 (11–7 ACC)
- Head coach: Sue Semrau (23rd season)
- Assistant coaches: Brooke Wyckoff; Joy McCorvey; JC Carter
- Home arena: Donald L. Tucker Center (Capacity: 12,100)

2019–20 ACC women's basketball standings
	Conf.				Overall
Team	W		L	PCT	W		L	PCT
No. 6 Louisville	16	–	2	.889	28	–	4	.875
No. 8 NC State†	14	–	4	.778	28	–	4	.875
Duke	12	–	6	.667	18	–	12	.600
No. 18 Florida State	11	–	7	.611	24	–	8	.750
Virginia Tech	11	–	7	.611	21	–	9	.700
Boston College	11	–	7	.611	20	–	12	.625
Georgia Tech	10	–	8	.556	20	–	11	.645
Syracuse	9	–	9	.500	16	–	15	.516
Virginia	8	–	10	.444	13	–	17	.433
Notre Dame	8	–	10	.444	13	–	18	.419
Miami (FL)	7	–	11	.389	15	–	15	.500
North Carolina	7	–	11	.389	16	–	14	.533
Wake Forest	7	–	11	.389	16	–	16	.500
Clemson	3	–	15	.167	8	–	23	.258
Pittsburgh	1	–	17	.056	5	–	26	.161
† 2020 ACC tournament winner As of March 5, 2020; Rankings from AP poll

The 2019–20 Florida State Seminoles women's basketball team, variously Florida State or FSU, represents Florida State University during the 2019–20 NCAA Division I women's basketball season. Florida State competes in Division I of the National Collegiate Athletic Association (NCAA). The Seminoles are led by head coach Sue Semrau, in her twenty-third year, and play their home games at the Donald L. Tucker Center on the university's Tallahassee, Florida campus. They are members of the Atlantic Coast Conference.

The Seminoles finished the season with a record of 24–8, 11–7 in the ACC, finishing in fourth place. Florida State reached the finals of the ACC tournament, finishing as runner-up. The NCAA tournament was canceled due to the coronavirus outbreak. Senior Forward Kiah Gillespie went on to be selected in the third round of the 2020 WNBA draft.

== Previous season ==
For the 2018–19 season, the Seminoles finished with a record of 24–9, 10–6 in the ACC, to finish in sixth place. Florida State was eliminated in the quarterfinals of the ACC tournament by NC State. The Seminoles received an at-large bid to the NCAA tournament as a five-seed, their seventh consecutive tournament appearance, and were defeated in the second round of the tournament by South Carolina.

== Off-season ==
=== Recruiting class ===
College recruiting
Name	Hometown	School	Height	Weight	Commit date
River Baldwin; C	Andalusia, Alabama	Pleasant Home	6 ft 5 in (1.96 m)	N/A	
River Baldwin; C	Recruit ratings: ESPN: (97)				
Sammie Puisis; G	Mason, Ohio	William Mason	6 ft 1 in (1.85 m)	N/A	
Sammie Puisis; G	Recruit ratings: ESPN: (97)				
London Clarkson; F	Pflugerville, Texas	Pflugerville	6 ft 2 in (1.88 m)	N/A	
London Clarkson; F	Recruit ratings: ESPN: (90)				
Overall recruit ranking:
Note: In many cases, Scout, Rivals, 247Sports, On3, and ESPN may conflict in their listings of height and weight.; In these cases, the average was taken. ESPN grades are on a 100-point scale.; Sources:

== Roster ==
2019–20 Florida State Seminoles women's basketball team
Players
Coaches

Pos.	#	Name	Height	Year	Hometown
C	1	River Baldwin	6 ft 5 in (1.96 m)	Fr	Andalusia, AL
G	2	Sammie Puisis	6 ft 1 in (1.85 m)	Fr	Mason, OH
G	3	Sayawni Lassiter	5 ft 10 in (1.78 m)	RS So	Dorchester, MA
G	4	Amaya Brown	5 ft 11 in (1.8 m)	So	Albuquerque, NM
G	10	Kourtney Webber	5 ft 10 in (1.78 m)	So	New Orleans, LA
G	12	Nicole Ekhomu	5 ft 9 in (1.75 m)	Sr	Bolingbrook, IL
G	13	Nausia Woolfolk	5 ft 9 in (1.75 m)	Sr	Fort Valley, GA
F	15	Kiah Gillespie	6 ft 2 in (1.88 m)	RS Sr	Meriden, CT
G	24	Morgan Jones	6 ft 2 in (1.88 m)	So	Jonesboro, GA
G	31	Savannah Wilkinson	5 ft 11 in (1.8 m)	Jr	London, England
F	32	Valencia Myers	6 ft 3 in (1.91 m)	So	Solon, OH
G	33	Izabella Nicoletti	5 ft 10 in (1.78 m)	RS Fr	São Paulo, Brazil
G	34	London Clarkson	6 ft 2 in (1.88 m)	RS Fr	Pflugerville, TX

Head coach

- Sue Semrau (UC San Diego)

Assistant coach(es)

- Brooke Wyckoff (Florida State)
- Joy McCorvey (St. John's)
- JC Carter (Stephen F. Austin)

Legend

- (C) Team captain
- (S) Suspended
- (I) Ineligible
- (W) Walk-on
- Injured
- Current redshirt

Roster
Last update: November 19, 2019

== Rankings ==
Ranking movements Legend: ██ Increase in ranking ██ Decrease in ranking т = Tied with team above or below
	Week																			
Poll	Pre	1	2	3	4	5	6	7	8	9	10	11	12	13	14	15	16	17	18	Final
AP	12	12	12	12T	8	8	8	8	8	11	13	14	14	17	14	17	19	22	18	19
Coaches	13	13	13	10	8	8	8	8	11	13	14	14	14	18	14	18	22	23	20	20

== Schedule and results ==
Date time, TV	Rank^{#}	Opponent^{#}	Result	Record	Site (attendance) city, state
Regular season
November 5, 2019*; 7:00 p.m., ACCNX	No. 12	Charleston Southern	W 88–36	1–0	Donald L. Tucker Center (2,472); Tallahassee, FL
November 9, 2019*; 7:00 p.m., SECN+	No. 12	at LSU	W 70–62	2–0	Pete Maravich Assembly Center (647); Baton Rouge, LA
November 13, 2019*; 7:00 p.m., ACCNX	No. 12	Jacksonville	W 75–41	3–0	Donald L. Tucker Center (2,718); Tallahassee, FL
November 17, 2019*; 2:00 p.m., ACCNX	No. 12	Samford	W 88–59	4–0	Donald L. Tucker Center (2,445); Tallahassee, FL
November 23, 2019*; 1:00 p.m., ESPN+	No. 12	at UIC	W 86–42	5–0	Credit Union 1 Arena (593); Chicago, IL
November 26, 2019*; 6:00 p.m., SECN+	No. 12	at Florida	W 66–55	6–0	O'Connell Center (1,469); Gainesville, FL
December 1, 2019*; 8:30 p.m., FS1	No. 12	vs. No. 6 Texas A&M; Maggie Dixon Classic	W 80–58	7–0	Schollmaier Arena (2,207); Fort Worth, TX
December 5, 2019*; 8:00 p.m., ACCN	No. 8	No. 19 Michigan State; ACC–Big Ten Women's Challenge	W 78–68	8–0	Donald L. Tucker Center (3,258); Tallahassee, FL
December 8, 2019; 12:00 p.m., ACCRSN	No. 8	at Clemson	W 81–64	9–0 (1–0)	Littlejohn Coliseum (1,052); Clemson, SC
December 15, 2019*; 2:00 p.m., ACCN	No. 8	St. John's	W 74–70	10–0	Donald L. Tucker Center (2,563); Tallahassee, FL
December 18, 2019*; 7:00 p.m., ACCNX	No. 8	North Florida	W 70–41	11–0	Donald L. Tucker Center (2,367); Tallahassee, FL
December 22, 2019*; 1:30 p.m., ACCN	No. 8	vs. No. 24 Michigan; Basketball Hall of Fame Women's Showcase	W 79–69	12–0	Mohegan Sun Arena (7,238); Uncasville, CT
December 29, 2019; 2:00 p.m., ACCRSN	No. 8	Virginia Tech	W 86–62	13–0 (2–0)	Donald L. Tucker Center (2,969); Tallahassee, FL
January 2, 2020; 8:00 p.m., ACCN	No. 8	at Syracuse	L 89–90 ^{OT}	13–1 (2–1)	Carrier Dome (1,489); Syracuse, NY
January 5, 2020; 2:00 p.m., ACCRSN	No. 8	at No. 23 Miami (FL)	W 73–62	14–1 (3–1)	Watsco Center (1,984); Coral Gables, FL
January 9, 2020; 7:00 p.m., ACCNX	No. 11	Georgia Tech	L 52–67	14–2 (3–2)	Donald L. Tucker Center (2,663); Tallahassee, FL
January 12, 2020; 2:00 p.m., ACCNX	No. 11	North Carolina	W 78–64	15–2 (4–2)	Donald L. Tucker Center (2,803); Tallahassee, FL
January 16, 2020; 6:00 p.m., ACCN	No. 13	at No. 9 NC State	L 51–68	15–3 (4–3)	Reynolds Coliseum (4,112); Raleigh, NC
January 23, 2020; 7:00 p.m., ACCNX	No. 14	at Wake Forest	W 70–65	16–3 (5–3)	LJVM Coliseum (688); Winston-Salem, NC
January 26, 2020; 2:00 p.m., ACCN	No. 14	Miami (FL)	W 79–61	17–3 (6–3)	Donald L. Tucker Center (4,569); Tallahassee, FL
January 30, 2020; 7:00 p.m., ACCNX	No. 14	Boston College	L 56–65	17–4 (6–4)	Donald L. Tucker Center (2,679); Tallahassee, FL
February 1, 2020; 5:00 p.m., ACCNX	No. 14	at Pittsburgh	W 66–41	18–4 (7–4)	Peterson Events Center (2,142); Pittsburgh, PA
February 6, 2020; 8:00 p.m., ACCN	No. 17	at No. 5 Louisville	W 67–59	19–4 (8–4)	KFC Yum! Center (8,314); Louisville, KY
February 9, 2020; 12:00 p.m., ACCN	No. 17	Virginia	W 63–55	20–4 (9–4)	Donald L. Tucker Center (3,221); Tallahassee, FL
February 16, 2020; 1:00 p.m., ACCN	No. 14	at Duke	L 64–66	20–5 (9–5)	Cameron Indoor Stadium (4,303); Durham, NC
February 20, 2020; 7:00 p.m., ACCNX	No. 17	Wake Forest	W 78–67	21–5 (10–5)	Donald L. Tucker Center (2,771); Tallahassee, FL
February 23, 2020; 4:00 p.m., ACCN	No. 17	at Georgia Tech	L 62–65	21–6 (10–6)	McCamish Pavilion (1,787); Atlanta, GA
February 27, 2020; 7:00 p.m., ACCRSN	No. 19	Clemson	W 81–54	22–6 (11–6)	Donald L. Tucker Center (2,836); Tallahassee, FL
March 1, 2020; 2:00 p.m., ESPN2	No. 19	Notre Dame	L 67–70	22–7 (11–7)	Donald L. Tucker Center (4,360); Tallahassee, FL
ACC Women's Tournament
March 6, 2020; 11:00 a.m., RSN	(4) No. 22	vs. (13) Wake Forest; Quarterfinals	W 76–47	23–7	Greensboro Coliseum (10,030); Greensboro, NC
March 7, 2020; 12:00 p.m., ESPNU	(4) No. 22	vs. (1) No. 4 Louisville; Semifinals	W 62–60	24–7	Greensboro Coliseum (6,751); Greensboro, NC
March 8, 2020; 12:00 p.m., ESPN2	(4) No. 22	vs. (2) No. 10 NC State; Final	L 66–71	24–8	Greensboro Coliseum (7,324); Greensboro, NC
*Non-conference game. ^{#}Rankings from AP Poll. (#) Tournament seedings in parentheses. All times are in Eastern Time.

== Honors ==
Weekly awards
Player	Award	Date Awarded	Ref.
Nausia Woolfolk	ACC Player of the Week	November 18, 2019	

- Katrina McClain Award finalist
  - Kiah Gillespie

=== All-ACC ===
- First Team
  - Nicki Ekhomu
  - Kiah Gillespie

=== All-Americans ===
- Nicki Ekhomu
- Kiah Gillespie
