= 2019–20 Virginia Tech Hokies women's basketball team =

Intercollegiate basketball season

2019–20 Virginia Tech Hokies women's basketball
- Conference: Atlantic Coast Conference
- Record: 21–9 (11–7 ACC)
- Head coach: Kenny Brooks (4th season)
- Assistant coaches: Britney Anderson; Jennifer Brown; Shawn Poppie
- Home arena: Cassell Coliseum

2019–20 ACC women's basketball standings
	Conf.				Overall
Team	W		L	PCT	W		L	PCT
No. 6 Louisville	16	–	2	.889	28	–	4	.875
No. 8 NC State†	14	–	4	.778	28	–	4	.875
Duke	12	–	6	.667	18	–	12	.600
No. 18 Florida State	11	–	7	.611	24	–	8	.750
Virginia Tech	11	–	7	.611	21	–	9	.700
Boston College	11	–	7	.611	20	–	12	.625
Georgia Tech	10	–	8	.556	20	–	11	.645
Syracuse	9	–	9	.500	16	–	15	.516
Virginia	8	–	10	.444	13	–	17	.433
Notre Dame	8	–	10	.444	13	–	18	.419
Miami (FL)	7	–	11	.389	15	–	15	.500
North Carolina	7	–	11	.389	16	–	14	.533
Wake Forest	7	–	11	.389	16	–	16	.500
Clemson	3	–	15	.167	8	–	23	.258
Pittsburgh	1	–	17	.056	5	–	26	.161
† 2020 ACC tournament winner As of March 5, 2020; Rankings from AP poll

The 2019–20 Virginia Tech Hokies women's basketball team represented Virginia Polytechnic Institute and State University during the 2019–20 NCAA Division I women's basketball season. The Hokies, led by fourth-year head coach Kenny Brooks, played their home games at Cassell Coliseum as members of the Atlantic Coast Conference.

The Hokies finished the season 21–9 and 11–7 in ACC play to finish in a tie for fourth place. As the fifth seed in the ACC tournament, they lost to Wake Forest in the Second Round. The NCAA tournament and WNIT were cancelled due to the COVID-19 outbreak.

== Previous season ==
They finished the 2018–19 season 22–12, 6–10 in ACC play to finish in a tie for tenth place. They advanced to the second round of the ACC women's tournament, where they lost to Clemson. They received an automatic bid to the Women's National Invitation Tournament, where they defeated Furman and VCU in the first and second rounds before losing to James Madison in the third round.

== Off-season ==
=== Recruiting class ===
College recruiting
Name	Hometown	School	Height	Weight	Commit date
Elizabeth Kitley; C	Summerfield, North Carolina	Northwest Guilford High School	6 ft 4 in (1.93 m)	N/A	
Elizabeth Kitley; C	Recruit ratings: ESPN: (97)				
Makayla Ennis; G	Ontario, Canada	The RISE Centre Academy	5 ft 11 in (1.80 m)	N/A	
Makayla Ennis; G	Recruit ratings: ESPN: (90)				
Taylor Geiman; G	Hanover, Pennsylvania	South Western Senior High School	6 ft 1 in (1.85 m)	N/A	
Taylor Geiman; G	Recruit ratings: ESPN: (90)				
Cayla King; PG	Greensboro, North Carolina	Northwest Guilford High School	5 ft 10 in (1.78 m)	N/A	
Cayla King; PG	Recruit ratings: ESPN: (90)				
Overall recruit ranking:
Note: In many cases, Scout, Rivals, 247Sports, On3, and ESPN may conflict in their listings of height and weight.; In these cases, the average was taken. ESPN grades are on a 100-point scale.; Sources:

== Roster ==
2019–20 Virginia Tech Hokies women's basketball team
Players
Coaches

Pos.	#	Name	Height	Year	Previous school	Hometown
F	0	Trinity Baptiste	6 ft 0 in (1.83 m)	Jr	Hillsborough; Northwest Florida St	Tampa, FL
G	2	Aisha Sheppard	5 ft 9 in (1.75 m)	Jr	St. John's	Alexandria, VA
G	3	Chloe Brooks	5 ft 10 in (1.78 m)	RS Fr	Spotswood	Harrisonburg, VA
G	4	Dara Mabrey	5 ft 7 in (1.7 m)	So	Manasquan	Belmar, NJ
G	5	Taja Cole	5 ft 8 in (1.73 m)	GS	L.C. Bird; Georgia	Richmond, VA
G	10	Kendyl Brooks	5 ft 10 in (1.78 m)	Sr	Spotswood	Harrisonburg, VA
G/F	15	Makayla Ennis	6 ft 0 in (1.83 m)	Fr	The RISE Centre Academy	Ontario, Canada
F	21	Lydia Rivers	6 ft 2 in (1.88 m)	GS	Kinston; Radford	Kinston, NC
G	22	Cayla King	5 ft 11 in (1.8 m)	Fr	Northwest Guilford	Greensboro, NC
F	23	Asiah Jones	6 ft 3 in (1.91 m)	RS Jr	Woodmond; USC	Sacramento, CA
C	33	Elizabeth Kitley	6 ft 5 in (1.96 m)	Fr	Northwest Guilford	Summerfield, NC
G/F	35	Tyalor Geiman	6 ft 0 in (1.83 m)	Fr	South Western	Hanover, PA
C	40	Alex Obouh Fegue	6 ft 4 in (1.93 m)	RS Jr	Pierre de Coubertin (Calais, France); Eastern Florida	Chatearoux, France

Head coach

- Kenny Brooks (James Madison)

Assistant coach(es)

- Britney Anderson (Virginia Tech)
- Jennifer Brown (James Madison)
- Shawn Poppie (Limestone)

Legend

- (C) Team captain
- (S) Suspended
- (I) Ineligible
- (W) Walk-on
- Injured
- Current redshirt

Roster
Last update: November 21, 2019

== Schedule ==
Date time, TV	Rank^{#}	Opponent^{#}	Result	Record	High points	High rebounds	High assists	Site (attendance) city, state
Non-conference regular season
November 5, 2019*; 7:00 p.m., ACCNX		Saint Francis (PA)	W 105–41	1–0	27 – Kitley	8 – Rivers	9 – Cole	Cassell Coliseum (1,209); Blacksburg, VA
November 10, 2019*; 2:00 p.m.		at George Mason	W 77–58	2–0	22 – Sheppard	15 – Rivers	7 – Cole	EagleBank Arena (1,282); Fairfax, VA
November 15, 2019*; 7:00 p.m., ACCNX		Liberty	W 73–69	3–0	20 – Sheppard	8 – Rivers	6 – Cole	Cassell Coliseum (1,422); Blacksburg, VA
November 19, 2019*; 6:30 p.m., ACCNX		Maryland Eastern Shore	W 85–43	4–0	20 – Baptiste	9 – Kitley	8 – Cole	Cassell Coliseum (1,110); Blacksburg, VA
November 24, 2019*; 5:00 p.m., ACCNX		Davidson	W 88–68	5–0	18 – Mabrey	9 – Kitley	3 – 3 tied	Cassell Coliseum (1,256); Blacksburg, VA
November 29, 2019*; 1:15 p.m.		vs. Belmont; Daytona Beach Invitational	W 60–58	6–0	18 – Sheppard	13 – Baptiste	7 – Cole	Ocean Center (173); Daytona Beach, FL
November 30, 2019*; 1:15 p.m.		vs. Georgia; Daytona Beach Invitational	L 72–77	6–1	24 – Mabrey	10 – Baptiste	6 – Cole	Ocean Center (213); Daytona Beach, FL
December 5, 2019*; 7:00 p.m., ACCNX		Purdue; ACC–Big Ten Women's Challenge	W 67–54	7–1	17 – Tied	12 – Baptiste	5 – Cole	Cassell Coliseum (1,282); Blacksburg, VA
December 8, 2019*; 2:00 p.m., ACCNX		Gardner-Webb	W 87–65	8–1	22 – Mabrey	17 – Baptiste	8 – Cole	Cassell Coliseum (1,291); Blacksburg, VA
December 20, 2019*; 1:30 p.m.		vs. Rice; Puerto Rico Coqui Classic	W 54–45	9–1	18 – Sheppard	14 – Kitley	4 – Rivers	Mario Morales Coliseum (100); Guaynabo, PR
December 21, 2019*; 11:00 a.m.		vs. Wichita State; Puerto Rico Coqui Classic	W 84–63	10–1	18 – Sheppard	12 – Rivers	10 – Cole	Mario Morales Coliseum (100); Guaynabo, PR
ACC regular season
December 29, 2019; 2:00 p.m., RSN		at No. 8 Florida State	L 62–86	10–2 (0–1)	14 – Tied	9 – Baptiste	5 – Cole	Donald L. Tucker Center (2,969); Tallahassee, FL
January 2, 2020; 7:00 p.m., ACCNX		at No. 9 NC State	L 69–76	10–3 (0–2)	28 – Sheppard	7 – 3 tied	6 – Cole	Reynolds Coliseum (4,153); Raleigh, NC
January 5, 2020; 2:00 p.m., ACCNX		North Carolina	W 76–70	11–3 (1–2)	16 – Tied	9 – Baptiste	4 – Mabrey	Cassell Coliseum (1,939); Blacksburg, VA
January 9, 2020; 7:00 p.m., ACCNX		Pittsburgh	W 68–56	12–3 (2–2)	21 – Cole	13 – Rivers	6 – Cole	Cassell Coliseum (1,332); Blacksburg, VA
January 12, 2020; 3:00 p.m., RSN		at Duke	L 67–72 ^{OT}	12–4 (2–3)	21 – Kitley	10 – Cole	5 – Cole	Cameron Indoor Stadium (3,088); Durham, NC
January 19, 2020; 3:00 p.m., RSN		at Virginia	W 69–61	13–4 (3–3)	15 – Mabrey	10 – Tied	8 – Cole	John Paul Jones Arena (4,313); Charlottesville, VA
January 23, 2020; 7:00 p.m., ACCNX		Boston College	W 70–49	14–4 (4–3)	20 – Baptiste	11 – Kitley	5 – Cole	Cassell Coliseum (1,428); Blacksburg, VA
January 26, 2020; 1:00 p.m., RSN		Clemson	W 71–50	15–4 (5–3)	15 – Cole	15 – Rivers	9 – Cole	Cassell Coliseum (1,839); Blacksburg, VA
January 30, 2020; 8:00 p.m., ACCN		at Syracuse	L 65–67	15–5 (5–4)	10 – Kitley	10 – Cole	9 – Cole	Carrier Dome (1,096); Syracuse, NY
February 2, 2020; 2:00 p.m., ACCNX		Miami (FL)	W 69–45	16–5 (6–4)	17 – Baptiste	8 – Baptiste	9 – Cole	Cassell Coliseum (1,629); Blacksburg, VA
February 6, 2020; 7:00 p.m., ACCNX		No. 7 NC State	L 59–71	16–6 (6–5)	19 – Cole	10 – Rivers	3 – Sheppard	Cassell Coliseum (2,271); Blacksburg, VA
February 9, 2020; 2:00 p.m., RSN		at North Carolina	W 72–63	17–6 (7–5)	18 – Mabrey	8 – Tied	3 – Cole	Carmichael Arena (2,536); Chapel Hill, NC
February 13, 2020; 7:00 p.m., ACCNX		Georgia Tech	W 64–61 ^{OT}	18–6 (8–5)	17 – Sheppard	13 – Rivers	8 – Cole	Cassell Coliseum (1,326); Blacksburg, VA
February 16, 2020; 1:00 p.m., ACCNX		at Wake Forest	W 73–62	19–6 (9–5)	21 – Kitley	14 – Kitley	9 – Cole	LJVM Coliseum (1,509); Winston-Salem, NC
February 20, 2020; 8:00 p.m., RSN		at Notre Dame	W 68–62	20–6 (10–5)	19 – Kitley	10 – Kitley	11 – Cole	Edmund P. Joyce Center (7,401); Notre Dame, IN
February 23, 2020; 2:00 p.m., ACCN		Virginia	L 76–86	20–7 (10–6)	32 – Sheppard	9 – Kitley	5 – Mabrey	Cassell Coliseum (2,597); Blacksburg, VA
February 27, 2020; 7:00 p.m., ACCNX		Duke	W 70–56	21–7 (11–6)	19 – Kitley	10 – Kitley	10 – Cole	Cassell Coliseum (1,603); Blacksburg, VA
March 1, 2020; 12:00 p.m., ACCN		at No. 5 Louisville	L 53–70	21–8 (11–7)	17 – Kitley	10 – Cole	3 – Cole	KFC Yum! Center (10,423); Louisville, KY
ACC Women's Tournament
March 5, 2020; 11:00 a.m., RSN	(5)	vs. (13) Wake Forest; Second round	L 55–58	21–9	15 – Kitley	10 – Rivers	3 – Cole	Greensboro Coliseum (6,357); Greensboro, NC
*Non-conference game. ^{#}Rankings from AP Poll. (#) Tournament seedings in parentheses. All times are in Eastern.

== Rankings ==
See also: 2019–20 NCAA Division I women's basketball rankings

Regular season polls
Poll	Pre- season	Week 2	Week 3	Week 4	Week 5	Week 6	Week 7	Week 8	Week 9	Week 10	Week 11	Week 12	Week 13	Week 14	Week 15	Week 16	Week 17	Week 18	Week 19	Final
AP																		RV		
Coaches																				

Legend
	Increase in ranking
	Decrease in ranking
	Not ranked in previous week
(RV)	Received votes
(NR)	Not ranked

== See also ==
- 2019–20 Virginia Tech Hokies men's basketball team
