= 2019–20 Virginia Cavaliers women's basketball team =

Intercollegiate basketball season

2019–20 Virginia Cavaliers women's basketball
- Conference: Atlantic Coast Conference
- Record: 13–17 (8–10 ACC)
- Head coach: Tina Thompson (2nd season)
- Assistant coaches: Karleen Thompson; Walter Pitts; Monica Wright
- Home arena: John Paul Jones Arena

2019–20 ACC women's basketball standings
| | Conf. | | | | Overall |
| Team | W | | L | PCT | W | | L | PCT |
|---|---|---|---|---|---|---|---|---|
| No. 6 Louisville | 16 | – | 2 | .889 | 28 | – | 4 | .875 |
| No. 8 NC State† | 14 | – | 4 | .778 | 28 | – | 4 | .875 |
| Duke | 12 | – | 6 | .667 | 18 | – | 12 | .600 |
| No. 18 Florida State | 11 | – | 7 | .611 | 24 | – | 8 | .750 |
| Virginia Tech | 11 | – | 7 | .611 | 21 | – | 9 | .700 |
| Boston College | 11 | – | 7 | .611 | 20 | – | 12 | .625 |
| Georgia Tech | 10 | – | 8 | .556 | 20 | – | 11 | .645 |
| Syracuse | 9 | – | 9 | .500 | 16 | – | 15 | .516 |
| Virginia | 8 | – | 10 | .444 | 13 | – | 17 | .433 |
| Notre Dame | 8 | – | 10 | .444 | 13 | – | 18 | .419 |
| Miami (FL) | 7 | – | 11 | .389 | 15 | – | 15 | .500 |
| North Carolina | 7 | – | 11 | .389 | 16 | – | 14 | .533 |
| Wake Forest | 7 | – | 11 | .389 | 16 | – | 16 | .500 |
| Clemson | 3 | – | 15 | .167 | 8 | – | 23 | .258 |
| Pittsburgh | 1 | – | 17 | .056 | 5 | – | 26 | .161 |
† 2020 ACC tournament winner As of March 5, 2020; Rankings from AP poll

The 2019–20 Virginia Cavaliers women's basketball team represented the University of Virginia during the 2019–20 NCAA Division I women's basketball season. The Cavaliers were led by second year head coach Tina Thompson, and played their home games at John Paul Jones Arena as members the Atlantic Coast Conference.

The Cavaliers finished the season 13–17 and 8–10 in ACC play to finish in ninth place. As the ninth seed in the ACC tournament, they lost to Syracuse in Second Round. The NCAA tournament and WNIT were cancelled due to the COVID-19 outbreak.

== Previous season ==
The 2018–19 Cavaliers finished the season 12–19, 5–11 in ACC play to finish in a twelfth place. They advanced to the second round of the ACC women's tournament where they lost to Syracuse. They did not qualify for post season play.

=== Recruiting class ===
College recruiting
| Name | Hometown | School | Height | Weight | Commit date |
|---|---|---|---|---|---|
| Shemera Williams; PG | Milwaukee, Wisconsin | University School of Milwaukee | 5 ft 7 in (1.70 m) | N/A | |
| Shemera Williams; PG | Recruit ratings: ESPN: (95) | | | | |
| Kylie Kornegay-Lucas; G | Camden, Delaware | New Hope Academy | 5 ft 10 in (1.78 m) | N/A | |
| Kylie Kornegay-Lucas; G | Recruit ratings: ESPN: (90) | | | | |
| Carole Miller; G | Alexandria, Virginia | Thomas Edison High School | 5 ft 11 in (1.80 m) | N/A | |
| Carole Miller; G | Recruit ratings: ESPN: (90) | | | | |
| Meg Jefferson; F | Sydney, Australia | Saint Colubma's Catholic College | 6 ft 1 in (1.85 m) | N/A | |
| Meg Jefferson; F | Recruit ratings: ESPN: (88) | | | | |
Overall recruit ranking:
Note: In many cases, Scout, Rivals, 247Sports, On3, and ESPN may conflict in their listings of height and weight.; In these cases, the average was taken. ESPN grades are on a 100-point scale.; Sources:

== Roster ==
2019–20 Virginia Cavaliers women's basketball team
Players
Coaches

| Pos. | # | Name | Height | Year | Previous school | Hometown |
|---|---|---|---|---|---|---|
| G | 0 | Dylan Horton | 5 ft 9 in (1.75 m) | Fr | Redondo Union | Los Angeles, CA |
| G | 1 | Carole Miller | 6 ft 0 in (1.83 m) | Fr | Thomas Edison | Alexandria, VA |
| G | 4 | Dominique Toussaint | 5 ft 9 in (1.75 m) | Sr | Christ the King | Staten Island, NY |
| G | 10 | Shemera Williams | 5 ft 8 in (1.73 m) | Fr | Milwaukee Academy of Science | Milwaukee, WI |
| F | 12 | Meg Jefferson | 6 ft 3 in (1.91 m) | Fr | St Columba's Catholic College | Sydney, Australia |
| G/F | 13 | Jocelyn Willoughby | 6 ft 0 in (1.83 m) | Sr | Newark Academy | Woodbridge, VA |
| F | 14 | Lisa Jablonowski | 6 ft 3 in (1.91 m) | Sr | Lycée de garçons | Ernster, Luxembourg |
| G | 15 | Kylie Kornegay-Lucas | 5 ft 10 in (1.78 m) | Fr | New Hope Academy | Camden, DE |
| G | 21 | Dani Lawson | 6 ft 2 in (1.88 m) | So | Hathaway Brown; Purdue | Cleveland, OH |
| G | 23 | Amandine Toi | 5 ft 10 in (1.78 m) | RS Fr | INSEP Academy | Paris, France |
| C | 30 | Felicia Aiyeotan | 6 ft 9 in (2.06 m) | Sr | Blair Academy | Lagos, Nigeria |

Head coach

- Tina Thompson (USC)

Assistant coach(es)

- Karleen Thompson (USC)
- Walter Pitts (Alabama)
- Monica Wright (Virginia)

Legend

- (C) Team captain
- (S) Suspended
- (I) Ineligible
- (W) Walk-on
- Injured
- Current redshirt

Roster
Last update: December 4, 2019

== Schedule ==
| Date time, TV | Rank^{#} | Opponent^{#} | Result | Record | Site (attendance) city, state |
Non-conference regular season
| November 5, 2019*; 7:00 p.m., ACCNX | | Bucknell | W 84–60 | 1–0 | John Paul Jones Arena (2,505); Charlottesville, VA |
| November 9, 2019*; 5:00 p.m., USC Live Stream | | at USC | L 49–59 | 1–1 | Galen Center (1,362); Los Angeles, CA |
| November 12, 2019*; 7:00 p.m. | | at CSUN | W 74–47 | 2–1 | Matadome (327); Northridge, CA |
| November 16, 2019*; 5:00 p.m., ACCNX | | No. 13 Kentucky | L 47–50 | 2–2 | John Paul Jones Arena (2,507); Charlottesville, VA |
| November 19, 2019*; 7:00 p.m., CBSSN | | at No. 4 UConn | L 44–83 | 2–3 | XL Center (7,728); Hartford, CT |
| November 24, 2019*; 2:00 p.m., ACCNX | | Old Dominion | W 56–53 ^{OT} | 3–3 | John Paul Jones Arena (2,522); Charlottesville, VA |
| November 30, 2019*; 2:00 p.m., ACCNX | | James Madison; Cavalier Classic | W 55–49 | 4–3 | John Paul Jones Arena (2,913); Charlottesville, VA |
| December 1, 2019*; 3:30 p.m., ACCNX | | No. 11 UCLA; Cavalier Classic | L 62–73 | 4–4 | John Paul Jones Arena (2,621); Charlottesville, VA |
| December 5, 2019*; 6:00 p.m., BTN | | at Rutgers; ACC–Big Ten Women's Challenge | L 63–73 | 4–5 | Louis Brown Athletic Center (1,597); Piscataway, NJ |
| December 20, 2019*; 5:00 p.m., FloHoops | | at UNLV; Duel in the Desert | W 63–55 | 5–5 | Cox Pavilion (655); Paradise, NV |
| December 21, 2019*; 5:30 p.m., FloHoops | | vs. No. 15 Mississippi State; Duel in the Desert | L 59–72 | 5–6 | Cox Pavilion (850); Paradise, NV |
ACC regular season
| December 29, 2019; 2:00 p.m., ACCNX | | at Georgia Tech | L 51–61 | 5–7 (0–1) | McCamish Pavilion (1,422); Atlanta, GA |
| January 2, 2020; 7:00 p.m., ACCNX | | North Carolina | L 47–65 | 5–8 (0–2) | John Paul Jones Arena (2,757); Charlottesville, VA |
| January 5, 2020; 12:00 p.m., RSN | | at No. 9 NC State | L 60–80 | 5–9 (0–3) | Reynolds Coliseum (4,487); Raleigh, NC |
| January 9, 2020; 6:00 p.m., ACCN | | Duke | W 66–63 | 6–9 (1–3) | John Paul Jones Arena (2,206); Charlottesville, VA |
| January 12, 2020; 2:00 p.m., ACCN | | at Boston College | W 69–52 | 7–9 (2–3) | Conte Forum (2,357); Chestnut Hill, MA |
| January 16, 2020; 7:00 p.m., ACCNX | | at Wake Forest | L 56–62 | 7–10 (2–4) | LJVM Coliseum (776); Winston-Salem, NC |
| January 19, 2020; 3:00 p.m., ACCN | | Virginia Tech | L 61–69 | 7–11 (2–5) | John Paul Jones Arena (4,313); Charlottesville, VA |
| January 23, 2020; 8:30 p.m., RSN | | at No. 5 Louisville | L 56–71 | 7–12 (2–6) | KFC Yum! Center (7,776); Louisville, KY |
| January 26, 2020; 2:00 p.m., ACCNX | | Notre Dame | W 90–60 | 8–12 (3–6) | John Paul Jones Arena (5,117); Charlottesville, VA |
| January 30, 2020; 6:00 p.m., ACCNX | | at North Carolina | L 68–78 | 8–13 (3–7) | Carmichael Arena (1,967); Chapel Hill, NC |
| February 2, 2020; 2:00 p.m., ACCNX | | Syracuse | W 57–41 | 9–13 (4–7) | John Paul Jones Arena (2,649); Charlottesville, VA |
| February 6, 2020; 7:00 p.m., ACCNX | | Clemson | W 70–54 | 10–13 (5–7) | John Paul Jones Arena (2,229); Charlottesville, VA |
| February 9, 2020; 12:00 p.m., ACCN | | at No. 17 Florida State | L 55–63 | 10–14 (5–8) | Donald L. Tucker Center (3,221); Tallahassee, FL |
| February 13, 2020; 7:00 p.m., ACCNX | | Miami (FL) | W 69–64 | 11–14 (6–8) | John Paul Jones Arena (2,351); Charlottesville, VA |
| February 20, 2020; 7:00 p.m., ACCNX | | at Duke | L 47–62 | 11–15 (6–9) | Cameron Indoor Stadium (3,154); Durham, NC |
| February 23, 2020; 2:00 p.m., ACCN | | at Virginia Tech | W 86–76 | 12–15 (7–9) | Cassell Coliseum (2,597); Blacksburg, VA |
| February 27, 2020; 7:00 p.m., ACCNX | | Pittsburgh | W 66–55 | 13–15 (8–9) | John Paul Jones Arena (2,211); Charlottesville, VA |
| March 1, 2020; 2:00 p.m., RSN | | No. 8 NC State | L 64–75 | 13–16 (8–10) | John Paul Jones Arena; Charlottesville, VA |
ACC Women's Tournament
| March 5, 2020; 2:00 p.m., RSN | (9) | vs. (8) Syracuse; Second round | L 50–67 | 2,781 | Greensboro Coliseum (13–17); Greensboro, NC |
*Non-conference game. ^{#}Rankings from AP Poll. (#) Tournament seedings in parentheses. All times are in Eastern.

== Rankings ==
Regular season polls
| Poll | Pre- Season | Week 2 | Week 3 | Week 4 | Week 5 | Week 6 | Week 7 | Week 8 | Week 9 | Week 10 | Week 11 | Week 12 | Week 13 | Week 14 | Week 15 | Week 16 | Week 17 | Week 18 | Week 19 | Final |
|---|---|---|---|---|---|---|---|---|---|---|---|---|---|---|---|---|---|---|---|---|
| AP | | | | | | | | | | | | | | | | | | | | N/A |
| Coaches | | | | | | | | | | | | | | | | | | | | |

Legend
| | Increase in ranking |
| | Decrease in ranking |
| | Not ranked previous week |
| (RV) | Received Votes |

== See also ==
- 2019–20 Virginia Cavaliers men's basketball team
