= 2020 ACC women's basketball tournament =

- Classification: Division I
- Season: 2019–20
- Teams: 15
- Site: Greensboro Coliseum; Greensboro, NC
- Champions: NC State (5th title)
- Winning coach: Wes Moore (1st title)
- MVP: Aislinn Konig (NC State)
- Attendance: 48,979
- Television: ESPN2, ESPNU, ACC Network Extra, ACCRSN

2019–20 ACC women's basketball standings
	Conf.				Overall
Team	W		L	PCT	W		L	PCT
No. 6 Louisville	16	–	2	.889	28	–	4	.875
No. 8 NC State†	14	–	4	.778	28	–	4	.875
Duke	12	–	6	.667	18	–	12	.600
No. 18 Florida State	11	–	7	.611	24	–	8	.750
Virginia Tech	11	–	7	.611	21	–	9	.700
Boston College	11	–	7	.611	20	–	12	.625
Georgia Tech	10	–	8	.556	20	–	11	.645
Syracuse	9	–	9	.500	16	–	15	.516
Virginia	8	–	10	.444	13	–	17	.433
Notre Dame	8	–	10	.444	13	–	18	.419
Miami (FL)	7	–	11	.389	15	–	15	.500
North Carolina	7	–	11	.389	16	–	14	.533
Wake Forest	7	–	11	.389	16	–	16	.500
Clemson	3	–	15	.167	8	–	23	.258
Pittsburgh	1	–	17	.056	5	–	26	.161
† 2020 ACC tournament winner As of March 5, 2020; Rankings from AP poll

The 2020 ACC women's basketball tournament, which concluded the 2019–20 season of the Atlantic Coast Conference, was held at Greensboro Coliseum in Greensboro, North Carolina, from March 4–8, 2020. NC State won the tournament and with it the ACC's automatic bid to the 2020 NCAA Women's Division I Basketball Tournament.

== Seeds ==
Seed	School	Conference Record	Tiebreaker
1	Louisville^{‡†}	16–2	
2	NC State^{†}	14–4	
3	Duke^{†}	12–6	
4	Florida State^{†}	11–7	1–0 vs. Lou
5	Virginia Tech^{#}	11–7	0–1 vs. Lou, 1–0 vs. BC
6	Boston College^{#}	11–7	0–2 vs. Lou, 0–1 vs. VT
7	Georgia Tech^{#}	10–8	
8	Syracuse^{#}	9–9	
9	Virginia^{#}	8–10	1–0 vs. Notre Dame
10	Notre Dame	8–10	0–1 vs. Virginia
11	Miami	7–11	2–1 vs. UNC & WF
12	North Carolina	7–11	1–1 vs. WF & Miami
13	Wake Forest	7–11	1–2 vs. UNC & Miami
14	Clemson	3–15	
15	Pittsburgh	1–17	
‡ – ACC regular season champions. † – Received a double-bye in the conference tournament. # – Received a single-bye in the conference tournament. Overall records include all games played in the ACC Tournament.

== Schedule ==
Session	Game	Time	Matchup	Score	Television	Attendance
First round – Wednesday, March 4
Opening day	1	1:00 pm	No. 12 North Carolina vs No. 13 Wake Forest	73–83	ACCRSN	2,795
Opening day	2	3:30 pm	No. 10 Notre Dame vs No. 15 Pittsburgh	65–67	ACCRSN	2,795
Opening day	3	6:30 pm	No. 11 Miami vs No. 14 Clemson	56–71	ACCRSN	2,795
Second round – Thursday, March 5
1	4	11:00 am	No. 5 Virginia Tech vs No. 13 Wake Forest	55–58	ACCRSN	6,357
1	5	2:00 pm	No. 8 Syracuse vs No. 9 Virginia	67–50	ACCRSN	2,781
2	6	6:00 pm	No. 7 Georgia Tech vs No. 15 Pittsburgh	68–58	ACCRSN	3,638
2	7	8:00 pm	No. 6 Boston College vs No. 14 Clemson	85–73	ACCRSN	3,638
Quarterfinals – Friday, March 6
3	8	11:00 am	No. 4 Florida State vs No. 13 Wake Forest	76–47	ACCRSN	10,030
3	9	2:00 pm	No. 1 Louisville vs No. 8 Syracuse	71–46	ACCRSN	3,811
4	10	6:00 pm	No. 2 NC State vs No. 7 Georgia Tech	57–48	ACCRSN	5,492
4	11	8:00 pm	No. 3 Duke vs No. 6 Boston College	77–84	ACCRSN	5,492
Semifinals – Saturday, March 7
5	12	12:00 pm	No. 1 Louisville vs No. 4 Florida State	60–62	ESPNU	6,751
5	13	2:30 pm	No. 2 NC State vs No. 6 Boston College	82–75	ESPNU	6,751
Championship – Sunday, March 8
6	14	12:00 pm	No. 2 NC State vs No. 4 Florida State	71–66	ESPN2	7,324
Game times in ET. Rankings denote tournament seed.

== Bracket ==
First round Wednesday, March 4
12	North Carolina	73
13	Wake Forest	83
10	Notre Dame	65
15	Pittsburgh	67
11	Miami	56
14	Clemson	71

Second round Thursday, March 5
8	Syracuse	67
9	Virginia	50
5	Virginia Tech	55
13	Wake Forest	58
7	Georgia Tech	68
15	Pittsburgh	58
6	Boston College	85
14	Clemson	73

Quarterfinals; Friday, March 6
1	Louisville	71
8	Syracuse	46
4	Florida State	76
13	Wake Forest	47
2	NC State	57
7	Georgia Tech	48
3	Duke	77
6	Boston College	84

Semifinals; Saturday, March 7
1	Louisville	60
4	Florida State	62
2	NC State	82
6	Boston College	75

Championship; Sunday, March 8
4	Florida State	66
2	NC State	71

== Game summaries ==
=== First round ===
RSN

March 4
1:00 p.m.

Report

#12 North Carolina 73, #13 Wake Forest 83
Scoring by quarter: 17–20, 18–17, 21–24, 17–22
Pts: Bennett (26); Rebs: Bailey (6); Asts: Bennett (7)	Pts: Raca (27); Rebs: Raca (13); Asts: Sharp/Scruggs (3)

Greensboro Coliseum
Greensboro, NC
Attendance: 2,795
Referees: Talisa Green
Jeff Smith
Karen Preato

RSN

March 4
3:30 p.m.

Report

#10 Notre Dame 65, #15 Pittsburgh 67
Scoring by quarter: 16–12, 17–22, 14–17, 18–16
Pts: Gilbert (20); Rebs: Vaughn (11); Asts: Sniezek/Brunelle (3)	Pts: Harris (20); Rebs: Harris (10); Asts: Harris/Prapa (3)

Greensboro Coliseum
Greensboro, NC
Attendance: 2,795
Referees: Tiara Cruse
Pualani Spurlock
Eric Brewton

RSN

March 4
6:30 p.m.

Report

#11 Miami (FL) 56, #14 Clemson 71
Scoring by quarter: 15–25, 18–12, 11–18, 12–16
Pts: Thornton (27); Rebs: Thornton (7); Asts: Spray (4)	Pts: Mompremier (23); Rebs: Banks/Harden (8); Asts: Gray (6)

Greensboro Coliseum
Greensboro, NC
Attendance: 2,795
Referees: Ed Sidlaksy
Bruce Morris
Maj Forsberg

=== Second round ===
RSN

March 5
11:00 a.m.

Report

#5 Virginia Tech 55, #13 Wake Forest 58
Scoring by quarter: 17–14, 9–12, 15–16, 14–16
Pts: Rivers (15); Rebs: Rivers (10); Asts: Cole (3)	Pts: Raca (16); Rebs: Sharp (9); Asts: Conti (4)

Greensboro Coliseum
Greensboro, NC
Attendance: 6,357
Referees: Tiara Cruse
Ed Sidlasky
Maj Forsberg

RSN

March 5
2:00 p.m.

Report

#8 Syracuse 67, #9 Virginia 50
Scoring by quarter: 20–18, 18–15, 15–14, 14–3
Pts: Finklea-Guity (15); Rebs: Engstler (7); Asts: Lewis (6)	Pts: Willoughby (13); Rebs: Willoughby (12); Asts: Toussaint (3)

Greensboro Coliseum
Greensboro, NC
Attendance: 2,781
Referees: Billy Smith
Carla Fountain
Joseph Vaszily

RSN

March 5
6:00 p.m.

Report

#7 Georgia Tech 68, #15 Pittsburgh 58
Scoring by quarter: 17–16, 14–10, 17–19, 20–13
Pts: Pan (26); Rebs: Cubaj (9); Asts: Fletcher (5)	Pts: Harris (21); Rebs: Brown (7); Asts: Harris (3)

Greensboro Coliseum
Greensboro, NC
Attendance: 3,638
Referees: Talisa Green
Thomas Danaher
Bryan Brunette

RSN

March 5
8:00 p.m.

Report

#6 Boston College 85, #14 Clemson 73
Scoring by quarter: 15–12, 29–22, 17–23, 24–16
Pts: Garraud (21); Rebs: Garraud (6); Asts: Garraud (5)	Pts: Meertens (20); Rebs: Meertens (5); Asts: Thomas/Meertens (3)

Greensboro Coliseum
Greensboro, NC
Attendance: 3,638
Referees: Fatou Cissoko-Stephens
Mark Resch
Eric Brewton

=== Quarterfinals ===
RSN

March 6
11:00 a.m.

Report

#4 Florida State 76, #13 Wake Forest 47
Scoring by quarter: 22–10, 20–15, 20–15, 14–7
Pts: Weber/Woolfolk (15); Rebs: Jones (7); Asts: Ekhomu (6)	Pts: Raca (18); Rebs: Sharp (5); Asts: 3 tied (1)

Greensboro Coliseum
Greensboro, NC
Attendance: 10,030
Referees: Tom Danaher
Joseph Vaszily
Pualani Spurlock

RSN

March 6
2:00 p.m.

Report

#1 Louisville 71, #8 Syracuse 46
Scoring by quarter: 14–8, 20–5, 22–20, 15–13
Pts: Evans (23); Rebs: Jones (10); Asts: Jones (4)	Pts: Lewis (18); Rebs: Strautmane (7); Asts: Colome (2)

Greensboro Coliseum
Greensboro, NC
Attendance: 3,811
Referees: Dee Kanter
Maj Forsberg
Tiara Cruse

RSN

March 6
6:00 p.m.

Report

#2 NC State 57, #7 Georgia Tech 48
Scoring by quarter: 7–16, 16–7, 17–14, 17–11
Pts: Cunane/Konig (16); Rebs: Jones (10); Asts: Crutchfield (4)	Pts: Fletcher/Pan (15); Rebs: Fletcher (9); Asts: Fletcher (3)

Greensboro Coliseum
Greensboro, NC
Attendance: 5,492
Referees: Carla Fountain
Karen Preato
Mark Resch

RSN

March 6
8:00 p.m.

Report

#3 Duke 77, #6 Boston College 84
Scoring by quarter: 18–17, 23–22, 17–22, 19–23
Pts: Gorecki (25); Rebs: Gorecki (10); Asts: Gorecki/Lambert/Boykin (5)	Pts: Soule (26); Rebs: Guy (10); Asts: Dickens (5)

Greensboro Coliseum
Greensboro, NC
Attendance: 5,492
Referees: Talisa Green
Luis Gonzales
Bryan Brunette

=== Semifinals ===
ESPNU

March 7
12:00 p.m.

Report

#1 Louisville 60, #4 Florida State 62
Scoring by quarter: 10–18, 20–12, 13–18, 17–14
Pts: Evans (16); Rebs: Jones (10); Asts: Evans (6)	Pts: Woolfolk (16); Rebs: Gillespie (16); Asts: Ekhomu (5)

Greensboro Coliseum
Greensboro, NC
Attendance: 6,751
Referees: Billy Smith
Bruce Morris
Denise Brooks

ESPNU

March 7
2:30 p.m.

Report

#2 NC State 82, #6 Boston College 75
Scoring by quarter: 23–24, 25–6, 15–17, 17–30
Pts: Konig (16); Rebs: Boyd (8); Asts: Crutchfield (5)	Pts: Ortlepp (14); Rebs: Guy (8); Asts: Dickens (5)

Greensboro Coliseum
Greensboro, NC
Attendance: 6,751
Referees: Dee Kantner
Maj Forsberg
Pualani Spurlock

=== Final ===
ESPN2

March 8
12:00 p.m.

Report

#2 NC State 71, #4 Florida State 66
Scoring by quarter: 14–19, 15–11, 18–15, 24–21
Pts: Konig/Cunnane (18); Rebs: Brown-Turner (10); Asts: Crutchfield/Jones (4)	Pts: Gillespie (25); Rebs: Gillespie (9); Asts: Ekhomu (5)

Greensboro Coliseum
Greensboro, NC
Attendance: 7,324
Referees: Joseph Vaszily
Eric Brewton
Karen Preato

== All-Tournament Teams ==
2020 ACC Women's Basketball All-Tournament Teams
First Team	Second Team
Aislinn Konig – NC State - MVP; Kiah Gillespie – Florida State; Nausia Woolfolk – Florida State; Dana Evans – Louisville; Ivana Raca – Wake Forest	Soule – Boston College; Nicki Ekhomu – Florida State; Francesca Pan – Georgia Tech; Jazmine Jones – Louisville; Elissa Cunane – NC State

== See also ==
- 2020 ACC men's basketball tournament
