= Lindsay Edmonds =

American college basketball coach

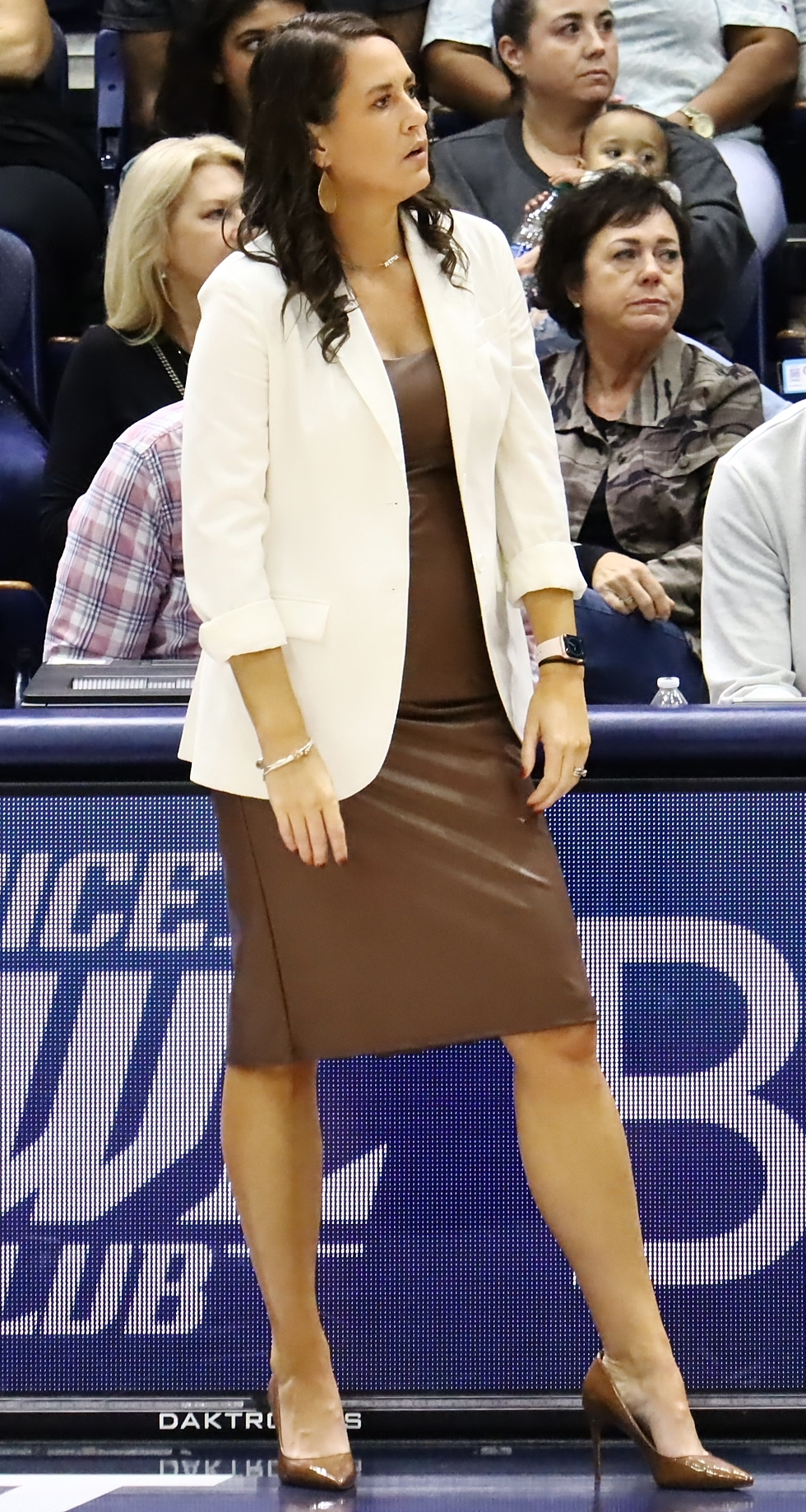
- Edmonds in 2023

Current position
- Title: Head coach
- Team: Rice Owls
- Conference: American
- Record: 102–60 (.630)

Playing career
- 2001–2005: Appalachian State

Coaching career (HC unless noted)
- 2007–2009: Appalachian State (asst.)
- 2009–2013: James Madison (asst.)
- 2013–2021: NC State (asst.)
- 2021–present: Rice

Head coaching record
- Overall: 102–60 (.630)
- Tournaments: 0–1 (NCAA); 1–1 (WNIT); 1–1 (WBIT)

Accomplishments and honors

Championships
- AAC Tournament (2024); American regular season (2026)

Awards
- American Coach of the Year (2026)

Lindsay Edmonds (née Smith) is an American college basketball coach who is currently the head coach of the Rice University women's basketball team. She previously served as an assistant coach at Appalachian State University, James Madison University, and North Carolina State University.

== Career ==
Edmonds was born in Winston-Salem, North Carolina. She attended college at Appalachian State, where she played on the basketball team for four years, serving as co-captain for two.

=== Appalachian State statistics ===
Legend
GP	Games played	GS	Games started	MPG	Minutes per game
FG%	Field goal percentage	3P%	3-point field goal percentage	FT%	Free throw percentage
RPG	Rebounds per game	APG	Assists per game	SPG	Steals per game
BPG	Blocks per game	PPG	Points per game	**Bold**	Career high

Year	Team	GP	Points	FG%	3P%	FT%	RPG	APG	SPG	BPG	PPG
2001–02	Appalachian State	29	209	35.2%	34.0%	76.0%	2.0	2.0	0.6	0.1	7.2
2002–03	Appalachian State	28	282	**39.8%**	**38.8%**	56.3%	**3.3**	2.5	0.6	0.1	10.1
2003–04	Appalachian State	**33**	263	32.4%	28.0%	**79.2%**	3.3	**3.0**	**1.2**	**0.4**	9.4
2004–05	Appalachian State	28	**322**	35.2%	30.6%	67.7%	2.6	2.3	0.9	0.4	**11.5**
Career		113	1076	35.6%	32.2%	68.8%	2.8	2.5	0.8	0.3	9.5

== Coaching ==
She began her coaching career in 2005 by coaching high school basketball, and in 2007 she took an assistant coaching position at her alma mater. In 2009, she became an assistant coach for the James Madison Dukes women's basketball team; during her four years at James Madison, the team made the NCAA Division I women's basketball tournament twice and the Women's National Invitation Tournament twice. North Carolina State hired Edmonds as an assistant coach in 2013; she was promoted to recruiting coordinator in 2018 and associate head coach in 2019. During her time at NC State, the school reached the NCAA tournament five times and the Sweet Sixteen three times.

Rice hired Edmonds in 2021 to coach their women's basketball team. Her overall record at Rice is 37–22 over two seasons. She led Rice to an appearance in the 2023 Women's National Invitation Tournament in the 2022–23 season.

== Personal life ==
Edmonds has a husband, Ulrick Edmonds, and three daughters. During NC State's appearance in the 2021 NCAA Division I women's basketball tournament, NCAA restrictions on team travel parties during the COVID-19 pandemic required her to travel without two of her daughters. She documented her experience to USA Today, which criticized the NCAA's treatment of her and other mothers coaching in the tournament.

== Head coaching record ==
Statistics overview
Season	Team	Overall	Conference	Standing	Postseason
Rice Owls (Conference USA) (2021–2023)
2021–22	Rice	14–13	8–9	9th	
2022–23	Rice	23–9	13–7	3rd	WNIT Second Round
Rice Owls (American Athletic Conference) (2023–present)
2023–24	Rice	19–15	9–9	T–6th	NCAA First Round
2024–25	Rice	17–17	7–11	T–8th	
2025–26	Rice	29–6	17–1	1st	WBIT Second Round
Rice:		102–60 (.630)	54–37 (.593)		
Total:		102–60 (.630)			
National champion Postseason invitational champion Conference regular season champion Conference regular season and conference tournament champion Division regular season champion Division regular season and conference tournament champion Conference tournament champion
