= Ashley Langford =

American women's college basketball coach

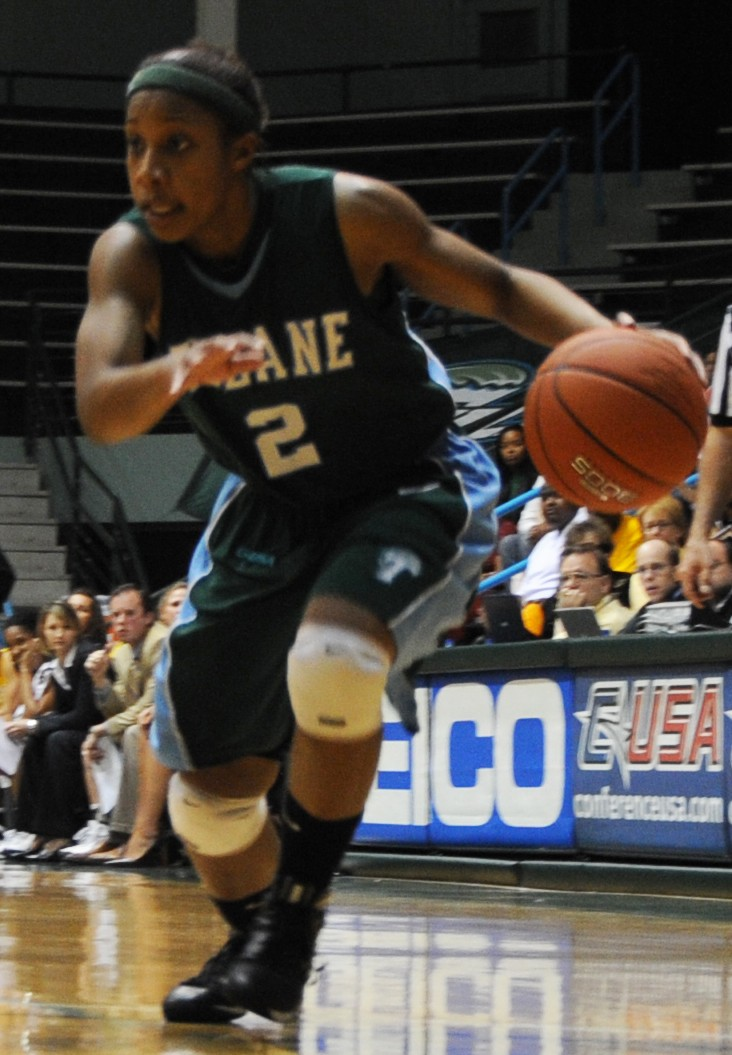
- Tulane women's head coach and former Green Wave point guard

Current position
- Title: Head coach
- Team: Tulane
- Conference: AAC
- Record: 28–33 (.459)

Biographical details
- Born: March 13, 1987 (age 39); Harrisburg, Pennsylvania, U.S.

Playing career
- 2005–2009: Tulane
- Position: Point guard

Coaching career (HC unless noted)
- 2009–2011: Auburn (GA)
- 2011–2012: Bucknell (assistant)
- 2012–2015: Denver (assistant)
- 2015–2016: Navy (assistant)
- 2016–2017: Old Dominion (assistant)
- 2017–2021: James Madison (associate)
- 2021–2024: Stony Brook
- 2024–present: Tulane

Head coaching record
- Overall: 97–57 (.630)
- Tournaments: 1–1 (WBIT); 0–1 (WNIT)

Accomplishments and honors

Championships
- CAA regular season (2024)

Awards
- CAA Coach of the Year (2024); CUSA All-Freshman Team (2006)

Ashley Brooke Langford (born March 13, 1987) is an American college basketball coach who is currently the head coach of the Tulane Green Wave women's basketball team. She previously was the head coach with the Stony Brook Seawolves women's basketball team.

== Early life ==
Langford was born in Harrisburg, Pennsylvania. She was raised by her father Sterling and attended Central Dauphin High School for three years before transferring to Harrisburg High School for her senior year. She played on the Philadelphia Belles AAU team.

== Playing career ==
Langford played college basketball for the Tulane Green Wave from 2005 to 2009. She was a four-year starting point guard and set the program record for most career assists (722), assists per game (6.0), games started (121) and minutes played (4,162). Her 722 assists are also the second most in Conference USA history. Langford led Tulane to a 2006–07 regular season title and an appearance in the 2007 WNIT. She finished her career with 1,047 points, graduating with the 17th-most points in program history.

She graduated in 2009 with a double major in business management and marketing.

Langford was inducted into the Tulane Athletics Hall of Fame in 2018.

== Coaching career ==
Langford began her coaching career as a graduate assistant for Auburn in 2009 while studying for her Master of Business Administration (MBA).

During the 2011–12 season, Langford was an assistant for Bucknell, working with the team's guards and coordinating the team's itinerary and travel plans. From 2012 to 2015, Langford was an assistant for the Denver Pioneers, where she was the recruiting coordinator, offensive coordinator and guards coach. She spent the 2015–16 season as an assistant for Navy and the 2016–17 season as an Old Dominion assistant.

Before the 2017–18 season, Langford joined Sean O'Regan's staff at James Madison. In August 2020, she was promoted to associate head coach. She served as acting head coach in January 2021 when O'Regan was out with COVID-19.

On April 28, 2021, Langford was named the head coach of the Stony Brook Seawolves. In Langford's first season, Stony Brook was banned from the America East tournament midseason in February 2022 due to an impending conference change to the Colonial Athletic Association. She finished her first year with a 23–6 record and an appearance in the WNIT. Langford's Seawolves made their CAA debut in her second year, and the team finished 18–13, losing to Northeastern in the conference quarterfinals.

On September 25, 2023, Langford was extended by Stony Brook until 2028. She won her 50th game on December 21, doing so in only 70 games, the fastest in program history. Stony Brook won the CAA regular title in their second season as a member of the conference, ending the regular season 25–3 and 16–2 in conference.

On April 2, 2024, Langford was hired as the head coach for her alma mater Tulane, replacing her former coach Lisa Stockton after 30 years. Langford went 69–24 (.742) in three seasons at Stony Brook.

== Head coaching record ==
Record table
Season	Team	Overall	Conference	Standing	Postseason
Stony Brook (America East) (2021–2022)
2021–22	Stony Brook	23–6	14–4	2nd	WNIT First Round
Stony Brook (CAA) (2022–2024)
2022–23	Stony Brook	18–13	11–7	6th	
2023–24	Stony Brook	28–5	16–2	1st	WBIT Second Round
Stony Brook:		69–24 (.742)	41–13 (.759)		
Tulane (American) (2024–present)
2024–25	Tulane	17–13	9–8	6th	
2025–26	Tulane	11–20	6–12	10th	
Tulane:		28–33 (.459)	15–20 (.429)		
Total:		97–57 (.630)			
National champion Postseason invitational champion Conference regular season champion Conference regular season and conference tournament champion Division regular season champion Division regular season and conference tournament champion Conference tournament champion

== Career statistics ==
=== College ===
Year	Team	GP	GS	MPG	FG%	3P%	FT%	RPG	APG	SPG	BPG	TO	PPG
2005–06	Tulane	26	-	38.4	30.5	21.7	86.7	3.5	6.6	1.8	0.0	3.1	9.0
2006–07	Tulane	33	-	33.4	34.2	37.5	82.7	3.5	6.3	2.3	0.1	2.5	7.4
2007–08	Tulane	30	-	35.2	36.8	26.1	85.1	3.1	5.3	1.7	0.1	2.9	11.9
2008–09	Tulane	32	-	31.4	34.1	34.8	81.1	3.3	5.8	1.8	0.1	2.5	6.7
Career		121	-	34.4	34.2	26.7	83.9	3.3	6.0	1.9	0.1	2.7	8.7
Statistics retrieved from Sports-Reference.
