= Jose Fernandez (basketball) =

American basketball coach (born 1971)

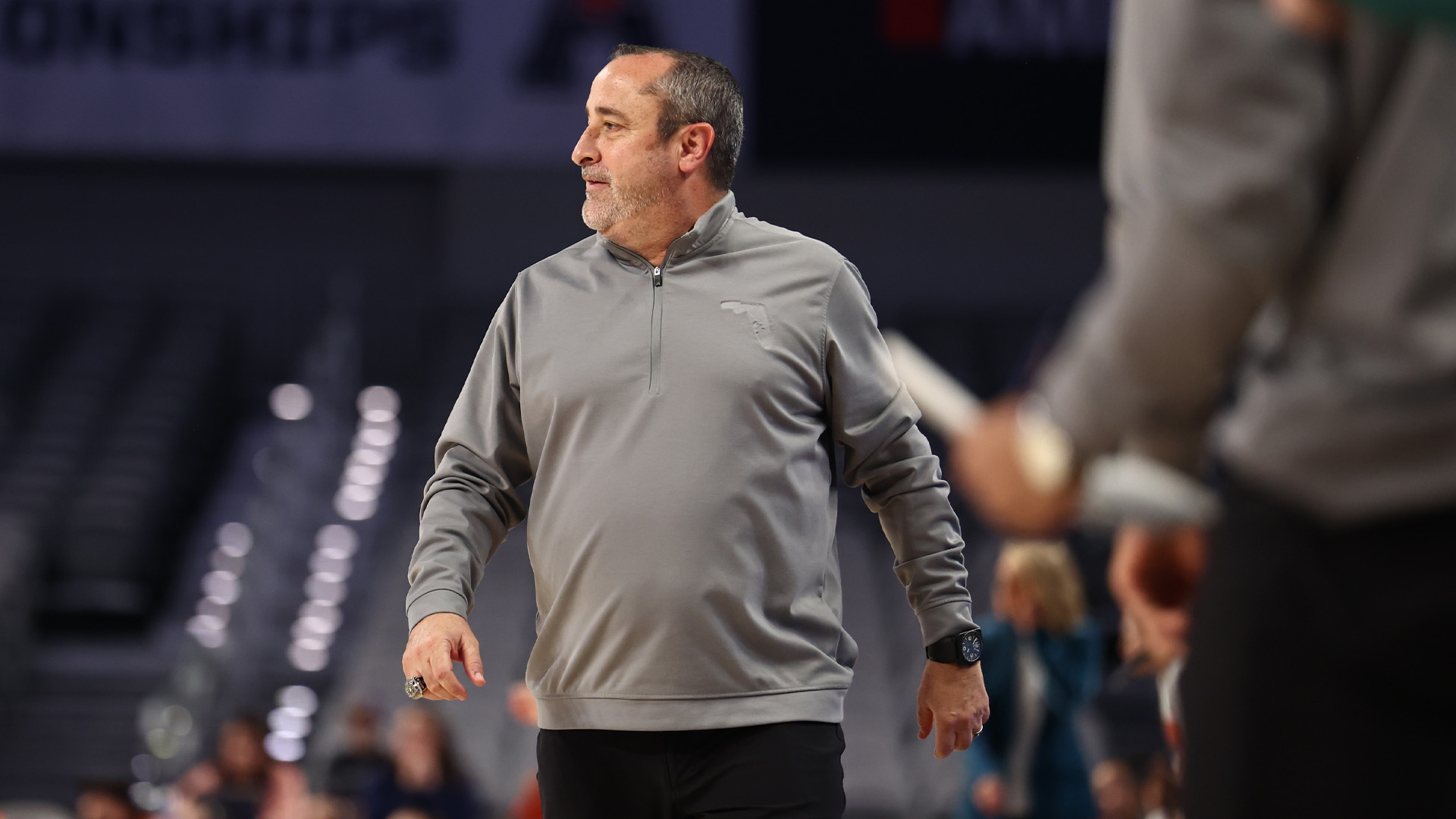
- Fernandez in 2023

Dallas Wings
- Position: Head coach
- League: WNBA

Personal information
- Born: November 18, 1971 (age 54) Miami, Florida, U.S.
- Coaching career: 1991–present

Career history

Coaching
- 1991–1992: Miami-Dade CC (men's asst.)
- 1992–1994: Miami Sunset HS (boys' asst.)
- 1994–1996: Barry (men's asst.)
- 1996–1999: Lourdes Academy
- 1999–2000: Barry
- 2000–2025: South Florida
- 2026–present: Dallas Wings

Career highlights
- WNIT champion (2009); 2× AAC Tournament champion (2021, 2025); 2× AAC regular season champion (2021, 2023); 2× AAC Coach of the Year (2018, 2021)

Jose Luis Fernandez (born November 18, 1971) is an American professional basketball coach who is the head coach of the Dallas Wings of the Women's National Basketball Association (WNBA). He previously served as the head coach of the South Florida Bulls women's basketball team from 2000 to 2025.

== Coaching career ==
=== Early coaching career (1991–2000) ===
Fernandez started in coaching while working on his associate degree at Miami-Dade CC Kendall, where he earned his degree in 1991. Fernandez served as a student assistant coach for the men's basketball team and was immediately thrown into the fray with on-floor coaching, scouting, and overseeing recruiting correspondence.

After graduating from Miami-Dade Kendall, Fernandez earned his bachelor's degree in physical education in 1994 from Florida International University. Along with his coaching duties at the beginning of his professional career, Fernandez also taught physical education at Miami's Coral Reef Senior High School, Southwest Senior High School and Hialeah Middle School.

While at Miami-Dade, Fernandez met Cesar Odio, who hired him as a student assistant and later promoted him to a full-time assistant coach in 1991. Fernandez stayed at Miami-Dade for one season (1991–92) before becoming the assistant boys’ basketball coach at Miami's Sunset High School from 1992 until 1994.

Following his two seasons at Sunset, Fernandez and Odio renewed acquaintances when Odio was tabbed head men's basketball coach at Barry University in Miami Shores, Florida (1994–1996). Fernandez came along as Odio's top assistant. During his two-year stay at Barry, Fernandez helped the Buccaneers to consecutive winning seasons, after the program only produced two in the first 10 years, and a combined 34–21 record.

Fernandez began coaching girls’ basketball in 1996, when he secured his first head coaching job at Miami's Lourdes Academy. During his three seasons at Lourdes, Fernandez led the Bobcats to an 83–16 (.838) record and a trip to the state Class 5A championship game in 1998 where they finished as the runner-up. In addition to his coaching responsibilities at Lourdes, Fernandez established roots among high school coaches from around Florida and the nation as director and founder of the successful Miami Suns AAU program.

Fernandez broke into collegiate women's basketball when he returned to Barry for his second of two tours of duty at the school. In his second stint, he served one year (1999–2000) as the top assistant coach for the Buccaneers. In that season, Fernandez helped Barry record the second-most wins in the program's history as the Buccaneers posted a 22–8 record and the program's second-best slate ever in the Sunshine State Conference at 10–4.

=== South Florida (2000–2025) ===
Extended content

2000–01

Fernandez was named head coach of the Bulls on November 14, 2000, and began laying the foundation for what would be the success of the current USF women's basketball program.

2001–02

Fernandez's first Division I recruiting class was ranked No. 36 in America by the All-Star Girls Report, the highest-ranked class in the history of the women's basketball program. That class provided instant dividends for USF as the Bulls opened 7–0 en route to their first winning season in four years (14–13) after going 4–24 the previous year. In that seven-game stretch, the Bulls defeated in-state rival and then BIG EAST Conference member Miami before falling to Florida for their first loss of the year.

2002–03

Fernandez followed his original recruiting class with a group that was tabbed 40th in America as it entered the 2002–03 campaign.

2003–04 (WNIT)

The Bulls’ 33rd ranked class included freshmen Jessica Dickson, Nalini Miller and Rachael Sheats, along with junior college transfer Anedra Gilmore. Along with this core group of newcomers and veteran returnees, Fernandez helped the Bulls advance to the postseason for the first time in school history when they faced Richmond in the first round of the WNIT

2004–05 (WNIT)

The Bulls recorded their best record (21–11) and set a school mark for wins in conference play (9–5). The team advanced to its second-consecutive WNIT, which included a home victory against Florida.

2005–06 (NCAA Tournament)

USF earned its first NCAA Tournament bid. Although the Bulls fell just short of the win total of the previous year, they made history by earning a No. 9 seed in the Bridgeport Region and were defeated 67–65 by No. 8 seed USC at Old Dominion University in Norfolk, Va.

The Bulls defeated nationally ranked DePaul (79–77 OT) and Notre Dame (68–64 OT). USF boasted a 19–12 record and a 9–7 conference slate (sixth in the BIG EAST).

The team's 2005–06 slate was the toughest in school history. The Bulls faced eventual Final Four participants No. 7/8 North Carolina, No. 13/15 Michigan State, and No. 3/3 LSU all prior to their conference schedule.

2006–07 (WNIT)

On December 28, 2006, with a 77–62 win against Vermont in the first round of the Saint Joseph's University Hawk Classic, Fernandez became the USF women's basketball team's career leader in wins, surpassing former Bulls’ head coach and former Charlotte Sting leader Trudi Lacey.

Later, Fernandez recorded his 100th career win a 66–49 win against Coppin State on March 19, 2007 in the second round of the WNIT. In addition, that appearance in the WNIT was the program's fourth straight postseason trip for USF, a first for either basketball program at the school.

2007–08 (WNIT)

The Bulls (16–16) advanced to their fifth consecutive postseason event, facing Florida Gulf Coast in the WNIT. USF knocked off No. 25 DePaul, 78–73, and defeated Syracuse in the BIG EAST Tournament's first round, 68–67 in overtime. The Orange had just dropped out of the Top 25 prior to their loss to the Bulls.

2008–09 (WNIT Champions)

Fernandez guided the Bulls to their most successful campaign. USF registered a school-record 27 wins and finished at least .500 (8-8) for the third time in the program's four years in the BIG EAST Conference. The Bulls had a second-place finish in the Paradise Jam in St. Thomas, U.S.V.I. with wins against Iowa, in overtime, and Texas Tech. The only loss during the event would come at the hands of No. 3 ranked California. USF defeated Rutgers on the road for the first time, and handed DePaul a crucial setback.

After advancing to their sixth consecutive postseason tournament, the Bulls made history by going 5–0 in the WNIT. After defeating Florida Gulf Coast in overtime and Southeastern Conference foe Ole Miss at home, USF embarked on a three-game, 10-day road odyssey that began in western New York with an 80–66 win at St. Bonaventure, then an 82–65 victory at Boston College. The Bulls headed to the nation's heartland where they handed Kansas a 75–71 loss in the WNIT finals in front of a record crowd of 16,113 at historic Allen Fieldhouse.

2009–10 (WNIT)

The Bulls advanced to their seventh consecutive postseason and posted a 15–16 record.

2010–11

USF finished 12–19 (3–13 slate in conference play) following its big 60–55 home win against No. 17/19 Georgetown in Tampa. After the season concluded, USF broke ground on its state-of-the-art practice facility, the Pam and Les Muma Basketball Center.

2011–12 (WNIT)

Fernandez guided USF to 19 wins despite having no true home games as the Sun Dome underwent renovations. The Bulls advanced to the WNIT's third round before falling at James Madison.

2012–13 (NCAA Tournament)

The Bulls made just the program's second NCAA Tournament appearance, earning a berth with 21 regular-season wins, including back-to-back wins against No. 12 Louisville on the road and No. 21 Syracuse at home. The Bulls defeated the Texas Tech Red Raiders 71–70 for their first NCAA Tournament victory, then lost to eventual Final Four team California in overtime, after a thrilling second-half comeback. Fernandez was the only coach to play all Final Four teams in 2012–13, defeating Louisville, losing to Notre Dame and California in overtime, and facing UConn in the regular season. Fernandez picked up win No. 200 of his career when USF defeated Detroit 74–60. Andrea Smith was drafted by the Connecticut Sun, adding to the trail of USF's post-college success.

2013–14 (WNIT)

USF made a deep run in the WNIT Tournament and Fernandez came one game shy of playing for his second WNIT Championship as the Bulls fell to Rutgers at home. The 23–13 season set the stage for the 2014–15 run.

2014–15 (NCAA Tournament)

Fernandez posted the program's sixth 20-win season (and third consecutive). The Bulls made history with two Top 25 rankings in the AP Poll en route to the program's best record (27–8). The Bulls reached a conference tournament championship game for the first time, grabbed the best NCAA Tournament seed in school history (No. 6), and hosted the early rounds for the first time. Fernandez coached an All-Region player for the third time in three years, and Williams was among the 12 Wade Trophy Finalists.

2015–16 (NCAA Tournament)

The Bulls returned to the NCAA Tournament for the third time in four years and ended the season in the top-25 for the second straight season. Along with coaching the program's first All-American, Fernandez achieved the highest ranking in program history (No. 15 in both the AP and USA Today Coaches’ polls). USF made its 12th postseason run in 13 seasons and its fourth NCAA Tournament appearance in program history.

The graduating class was the first to make three NCAA appearances. It reached the postseason four times and made back-to-back trips to the AAC Tournament title game. Fernandez coached the program's first WBCA All-American (Williams), and the third-highest drafted Bull in USF Athletics history. Fernandez also guided Laksa to the program's second conference Freshman of the Year honor.

2016–17 (NCAA Tournament)

The Bulls entered the season being ranked for 22 consecutive weeks. They had the most successful non-conference record. For the second straight year, Fernandez coached the league's Freshman of the Year (Tamara Henshaw) and a unanimous conference first-team selection (Laksa). On January 17, 2017, Fernandez, the all-time winningest coach in USF basketball history, reached his 300th career win in front of a home crowd at the Yuengling Center. The Bulls reached the AAC Tournament title game for the third straight season.

2017–18 (NCAA Tournament)

USF reached its fourth straight AAC Tournament championship game and made its fourth straight NCAA Tournament appearance. Fernandez was named AAC Coach of the Year. The Bulls were led by seniors Laia Flores and Jespersen, who earned AP honorable-mention All-America honors, and junior guard Kitija Laksa. USF finished 26–8, which included an 84–65 home trouncing of No. 13 Ohio State.

2018–19 (WNIT)

Decimated by season-ending injuries, USF battled into the AAC Tournament semifinals for the sixth straight season. The Bulls, ranked No. 22 nationally, extended their postseason appearance streak to eight as they advanced to the WNIT second round. USF posted marquee non-conference wins against Ohio State (71–47 on the road), Oklahoma (87–70), UCLA (60–56), and George Washington (63–60), en route to a 9–2 start. The Bulls also nearly stunned No. 2 UConn at the Yuengling Center on Senior Night, trailing the Huskies by one with just over six minutes to play, before UConn ended the game on a 9–0 run. Enna Pehadzic was tabbed a second-team All-Conference selection while Harvey was named to the All-Freshman Team.

2019–20 *

(Postseason canceled due to the COVID-19 pandemic)

In a basketball season that will include an asterisk moving forward, USF was on the cusp of recording its seventh 20-win season in the last eight years and advancing to its seventh straight postseason tournament. However the COVID-19 pandemic led to the cancellation of the remainder of the NCAA basketball season. The Bulls endured a second consecutive year of season-ending and significant injuries, but still recorded a 19–13 record and advanced to the AAC Tournament semifinals for the seventh straight year. After getting as high as No. 21 in the AP and No. 20 in the Coaches poll, USF posted signature non-conference wins against No. 15 Texas, 64–57, and VCU, 77–55, and trailed No. 2 Baylor by three with three minutes left before falling in the end. In addition, the Bulls No. 5 UConn at the half and trailed by just five points entering the fourth quarter before UConn pulled away in its final AAC appearance at the Yuengling Center.

Tsineke, the team's leading scorer, was tabbed AAC Freshman of the Year, in addition to being named to the All-Freshmen Team and third team All-Conference. Pinzan, the league leader in assists per game, was named third team All-Conference.

2020–21 (NCAA Tournament)

Despite seeking a sense of normalcy, the Bulls dealt with COVID-19 obstacles all season. But USF still advanced to its seventh NCAA Tournament and its fourth appearance in the Round of 32. USF played a modified regular-season schedule of 24 games – four non-conference and 20 in the AAC – with next to no fans at home games due to restrictions. Eight games were either postponed or canceled, including seven straight, but USF still was 19–4 and 12–2 in the AAC. The Bulls nearly shocked the fourth-ranked Baylor Lady Bears, the defending national champion, but fell 67–62. In the next game, USF defeated the No. 6-ranked Mississippi State Bulldogs in overtime, the highest-ranked team it had ever beaten. It was the first of program-record 13-straight victories for USF, which rose to its highest ranking in program history, No. 12 in the February 15 Associated Press Top 25 poll.

After winning the AAC regular-season title, USF had an impressive showing when the league announced its postseason award winners. Five players were honored, and Fernandez was named the AAC Coach of the Year. Elisa Pinzan was tabbed the league's Most Improved Player, and Maria Alvarez was chosen as the Co-Sixth Player of the Year. Bethy Mununga and Elena Tsineke were named to the All-AAC first team, Pinzan was a second-team selection and Sydni Harvey earned third-team honors. Following USF's historic showing in the conference tournament, Harvey was named tournament Most Outstanding Player after averaging a team-high 16.0 points per game. Tsineke, the championship game's leading scorer (23 points), and Mununga joined Harvey on the All-Tournament Team. In addition, Fernandez was a finalist for the 2021 United States Marine Corps/WBCA NCAA Division I National Coach of the Year and was a semifinalist for the 2021 Werner Ladder Naismith Women's Coach of the Year.

2021–22 (NCAA Tournament)

With nearly every significant player returning from the AAC regular-season and tournament championship teams, expectations were soaring for the Bulls. USF boosted its stock by defeating No. 9 Oregon 71–62 in the Bad Boy Mowers Battle 4 Atlantis. Then in a standalone game, also in the Bahamas, the Bulls upended No. 7 Stanford, the defending national champion, 57–54 on Sydni Harvey's 3-pointer from the wing with 2.8 seconds remaining. The Bulls won five straight games to close out the AAC regular season, including a smashing 71–38 romp against Houston on a night in which the 50th anniversary of USF women's basketball was celebrated. The Bulls reached the AAC Tournament championship game but fell to top-seeded UCF 53–45. In the NCAA Tournament's opening round, the Bulls were beaten by Miami 78–66.

2022–23 (NCAA Tournament)

In 2022–23 South Florida posted a 27–7 overall record and held a 15–1 mark in conference action, which earned the squad the regular season title. The 2022–23 campaign was concluded on a high note, as the program made its ninth appearance in the NCAA Tournament, marking its eighth trip to the Big Dance in the last 11 years.

Included in their 27 wins were ranked victories against No. 22/18 Texas, 70–65, a gritty 66–65 overtime win versus No. 17/19 Arkansas in the San Diego Invitational, and a 67–65, comeback overtime triumph against ninth-seeded Marquette in the first round of March Madness. The season came to an end in the following round, as No. 1/1 South Carolina bested the Bulls, 76–45.

Elena Tsineke and Dulcy Fankam Mendjiadeu, the best players in The American all season, were recognized for just that as both were named Co-Players of the Year and were unanimous picks for First Team All-Conference. It marks the first time that the Bulls have had a player(s) named Player of the Year in The American and it's just the second time in conference history – the first since 2017 – that two individuals have shared the honor. Sammie Puisis was named the conference Newcomer of the Year – another first for South Florida – and was a Second Team selection while Carla Brito was named to the All-Freshman Team.

2023-24

South Florida finished the 2023–24 campaign 19–14 and 10–8 in league play. The 19 overall wins marked Fernandez's 13th straight and 17th total 19-win season, while it's the 10th time and fifth straight year the Bulls have collected 10-or more regular season conference victories.

The duo of Vittoria Blasigh and Romi Levy were recognized as two of the top players in the American with postseason accolades. Blasigh was tabbed the AAC Freshman of the Year and Levy earned AAC Newcomer of the Year, All-Conference second team, and All-Newcomer team honors. Blasigh is the fifth freshman in program history (fourth Bull in AAC history) to earn the honor, Levy is the second USF performer to earn Newcomer of the Year honors, following Sammie Puisis (2022–23) in back-to-back seasons.

2024-25 (NCAA Tournament)

The Bulls concluded the 2024-25 season with a 23–11 mark and 13–4 in league action, which marked Coach Fernandez's 14th straight 19-win season and 12th 20-win season. The program earned its fourth league title and 10th NCAA Tournament berth by winning the 2025 AAC Conference Tournament Championship by defeating Tulane, North Texas, and Rice in the span of three days.

USF's nonconference schedule was highlighted by a 65–56 win over No. 9/10 Duke (December 21). The win over the Blue Devils is the Bulls first Top-10 ranked victory since defeating No. 7/5 Stanford, 57–54 (November 26, 2021). The ranked victory was the 22nd-ranked win in program history, Head Coach Jose Fernandez's 20th-ranked win, and the program's 30th win against a Power-5 opponent.

South Florida women's basketball graduate guard Mama Dembele was named the AAC Defensive Player of the Year, and senior forward L'or Mputu was tabbed AAC Most Improved Player, Graduate guard Sammie Puisis landed on the All-Conference First Team, junior forward Carla Brito earned a spot on the All-Conference Second Team, and Dembele was also named to the All-Defensive Team after the regular season.

Dembele is the first player in program history to earn the Defensive Player of the Year distinction, while Mputu is the fourth player in program history and the third Bull in AAC history to be named the Most Improved Player of the Year.

=== Dallas Wings (2026–present) ===
On October, 27, 2025, Fernandez was named head coach of the Dallas Wings.

== Personal life ==
Fernandez and his wife, Tonya, live in Tampa with their daughters, Sydnie, Alex, Taylor, Brianna, and Brooke.

== Head coaching record ==
=== College ===
Record table
Season	Team	Overall	Conference	Standing	Postseason
South Florida Bulls (Conference USA) (2000–2005)
2000–01	South Florida	4–24	1–15	14th	
2001–02	South Florida	14–13	4–10	T–13th	
2002–03	South Florida	7–20	2–12	14th	
2003–04	South Florida	14–15	7–7	8th	WNIT First Round
2004–05	South Florida	21–11	9–5	T-5th	WNIT Second Round
South Florida Bulls (Big East Conference) (2005–2013)
2005–06	South Florida	19–12	9–7	T–6th	NCAA First Round
2006–07	South Florida	21–12	9–7	T–8th	WNIT Second Round
2007–08	South Florida	16–16	5–11	T–11th	WNIT First Round
2008–09	South Florida	27–10	8–8	8th	WNIT Champion
2009–10	South Florida	15–16	6–10	T–10th	WNIT First Round
2010–11	South Florida	12–19	3–13	T–13th	
2011–12	South Florida	19–16	8–8	9th	WNIT Third Round
2012–13	South Florida	22–11	9–7	T–6th	NCAA Second Round
South Florida Bulls (American Athletic Conference) (2013–2025)
2013–14	South Florida	23–13	13–5	3rd	WNIT Semifinal
2014–15	South Florida	27–8	15–3	2nd	NCAA Second Round
2015–16	South Florida	24–10	14–4	2nd	NCAA Second Round
2016–17	South Florida	24–9	11–5	3rd	NCAA First Round
2017–18	South Florida	26–8	13–3	2nd	NCAA First Round
2018–19	South Florida	19–16	7–9	T-5th	WNIT Second Round
2019–20	South Florida	19–13	10–6	4th	Postseason cancelled due to COVID-19
2020–21	South Florida	19–4	13–2	1st	NCAA Second Round
2021–22	South Florida	24–9	12–3	2nd	NCAA First Round
2022–23	South Florida	27–7	15–1	1st	NCAA Second Round
2023–24	South Florida	19–14	10–8	T–4th	
2024–25	South Florida	23–11	13–4	3rd	NCAA First Round
Total:		485–317 (.605)			
National champion Postseason invitational champion Conference regular season champion Conference regular season and conference tournament champion Division regular season champion Division regular season and conference tournament champion Conference tournament champion
