= 2021–22 South Florida Bulls women's basketball team =

American college basketball season

2021–22 South Florida Bulls women's basketball

NCAA Women's Tournament, first round
- Conference: American Athletic Conference
- Record: 24–9 (12–3 The American)
- Head coach: Jose Fernandez (22nd season)
- Associate head coach: Michele Woods-Baxter
- Assistant coaches: Danny Hughes; Yolisha Jackson
- Home arena: Yuengling Center

2021–22 American Athletic Conference women's basketball standings
	Conf.				Overall
Team	W		L	PCT	W		L	PCT
No. 24 UCF †	14	–	1	.933	26	–	4	.867
South Florida	12	–	3	.800	24	–	9	.727
Tulane	11	–	5	.688	21	–	10	.677
Temple	8	–	8	.500	13	–	15	.464
SMU	7	–	7	.500	14	–	15	.483
Houston	7	–	9	.438	18	–	16	.529
Memphis	6	–	9	.400	16	–	12	.571
Tulsa	5	–	8	.385	17	–	11	.607
Wichita State	5	–	11	.313	14	–	16	.467
East Carolina	4	–	11	.267	11	–	18	.379
Cincinnati	4	–	11	.267	11	–	17	.393
† 2022 AAC tournament winner Rankings from AP poll

The 2021–22 South Florida Bulls women's basketball team represented the University of South Florida in the 2021–22 NCAA Division I women's basketball season. The Bulls, coached by Jose Fernandez in his 22nd season, played their home games at the USF Sun Dome in Tampa, Florida. This was USF's ninth season as a member of the American Athletic Conference, known as The American or AAC. They finished the season 24–9, 12–3 in AAC play to finish in second place. They advanced to the championship game of the American Athletic Conference women's tournament, where they lost to UCF. They received an at-large bid to the NCAA women's tournament, where they lost to Miami in the first round.

== Previous season ==
The Bulls finished the 2020–21 season 19–4, 13–2 in AAC play to finish win their first ever American Athletic championship. USF won the AAC tournament by defeating UCF in the championship game. They received an automatic bid to the NCAA tournament as a No. 8 seed, where they defeated No. 9 seed Washington State in the first round before losing to No. 1 seed NC State in the second round.

== Media ==
All Bulls games aired on Bullscast Radio or CBS 1010 AM. All home games and home and away conference games were available on one of the ESPN networks or their streaming service, ESPN+.

== Roster ==
2021–22 South Florida Bulls women's basketball team
Players
Coaches

Pos.	#	Name	Height	Year	Previous school	Hometown
F	0	Odeth Betancourt	6 ft 2 in (1.88 m)	So	Panola College	San Cristóbal, Venezuela
G	1	Maria Alvarez	5 ft 7 in (1.7 m)	So	Miami Country Day School	Bal Harbour, Florida
G	2	Mihaela Lazić	5 ft 6 in (1.68 m)	RS Fr	Klasična Gimnazija	Slavonski Brod, Croatia
PG	3	Sydni Harvey	5 ft 10 in (1.78 m)	Jr	Brentwood Academy	Nashville, Tennessee
PG	4	Elisa Pinzan	5 ft 8 in (1.73 m)	Jr	Istituto Tecnico Algarotti Venezia	Murano, Italy
G	5	Elena Tsineke	5 ft 7 in (1.7 m)	So	Hellenic College of Thessaloniki	Thessaloniki, Greece
F/C	11	Patience Williams	6 ft 1 in (1.85 m)	Fr	Benilde-St. Margaret's High School; Florida SouthWestern State	Minneapolis, Minnesota
F	12	Cristina Bermejo	6 ft 1 in (1.85 m)	So	INS Sant Just Desvern	Sant Just Desvern, Spain
F	13	Sara Guerreiro	5 ft 8 in (1.73 m)	Fr		Seixal, Portugal
F	20	Bethy Mununga	6 ft 0 in (1.83 m)	Sr	Institut Sainte-Marie Jambes	Zellik, Belgium
C	21	Shae Leverett	6 ft 2 in (1.88 m)	Sr	South Effingham High School	Rincon, Georgia
G	22	Aerial Wilson	5 ft 10 in (1.78 m)	So	The RISE Centre; Memphis	Dundas, Ontario
G	24	Bella Weary	5 ft 6 in (1.68 m)	Fr	DME Academy	Jacksonville, Florida
F	32	Dulcy Fankam Mendjiadeu	6 ft 4 in (1.93 m)	RS Sr	Walters State Community College	Nkongsamba, Cameroon

Head coach

- Jose Fernandez (Miami-Dade Kendall)

Assistant coach(es)

- Michele Woods-Baxter (St. John Fisher College)
- Danny Hughes (TCU)
- Yolisha Jackson (Jacksonville)

Legend

- (C) Team captain
- (S) Suspended
- (I) Ineligible
- (W) Walk-on
- Injured
- Current redshirt

Roster

== Schedule ==
Date time, TV	Rank^{#}	Opponent^{#}	Result	Record	Site (attendance) city, state
Non-conference regular season
November 9, 2021*; 8:00 pm, ESPN+	No. 21	UTRGV	W 63–56	1–0	Yuengling Center (2,710); Tampa, FL
November 11, 2021*; 7:00 pm, ESPN+	No. 21	Alabama State	W 72–37	2–0	Yuengling Center (2,123); Tampa, FL
November 15, 2021*; 6:30 pm, SECN+	No. 23	at No. 16 Tennessee; AAC/SEC Challenge	L 49–52	2–1	Thompson–Boling Arena (6,017); Knoxville, TN
November 20, 2021*; 2:30 pm, FloHoops	No. 23	vs. Syracuse; Battle 4 Atlantis Quarterfinals	W 77–53	3–1	Imperial Arena (993); Paradise Island, Bahamas
November 21, 2021*; 12:00 pm, FloHoops	No. 23	vs. No. 2 UConn; Battle 4 Atlantis Semifinals	L 53–60	3–2	Imperial Arena (1,124); Paradise Island, Bahamas
November 22, 2021*; 2:30 pm, ESPNU	No. 23	vs. No. 9 Oregon; Battle 4 Atlantis 3rd place game	W 71–62	4–2	Imperial Arena (269); Paradise Island, Bahamas
November 26, 2021*; 12:00 pm, FloHoops	No. 18	vs. No. 7 Stanford; Baha Mar Hoops	W 57–54	5–2	Baha Mar Convention Center (205); Nassau, Bahamas
December 2, 2021*; 7:00 pm, ESPN+	No. 13	at UT Arlington	L 56–61	5–3	College Park Center (630); Arlington, TX
December 12, 2021*; 12:00 pm, ESPN+	No. 17	at VCU	W 64–57	6–3	Siegel Center (393); Richmond, VA
December 15, 2021*; 11:00 am, ESPN+	No. 16	Stetson	W 69–50	7–3	Yuengling Center (2,847); Tampa, FL
December 17, 2021*; 7:00 pm, ESPN+	No. 16	High Point	W 62–46	8–3	Yuengling Center (1,562); Tampa, FL
December 20, 2021*; 1:15 pm, FloHoops	No. 18	vs. West Virginia; West Palm Beach Invitational	W 77–55	9–3	Student Life Center; West Palm Beach, FL
December 21, 2021*; 1:15 pm, FloHoops	No. 18	vs. Ole Miss; West Palm Beach Invitational	L 53–61	9–4	Student Life Center; West Palm Beach, FL
December 29, 2021*; 4:00 pm, ESPN+	No. 22	Jacksonville	W 70–57	10–4	Yuengling Center (1,996); Tampa, FL
AAC regular season
January 2, 2022; 2:00 pm, ESPN+	No. 22	Memphis	Postponed		Yuengling Center; Tampa, FL
January 5, 2022; 7:00 pm, ESPN+	No. 24	at Cincinnati	W 61–46	11–4 (1–0)	Fifth Third Arena (310); Cincinnati, OH
January 12, 2022; 7:00 pm, ESPN+	No. 24	at Tulane	W 75–62	12–4 (2–0)	Devlin Fieldhouse (577); New Orleans, LA
January 16, 2022; 3:00 pm, ESPNU	No. 24	at UCF; War on I-4	L 57–61	12–5 (2–1)	Addition Financial Arena (2,763); Orlando, FL
January 19, 2022; 7:00 pm, ESPN+		Tulsa	W 66–63	13–5 (3–1)	Yuengling Center (1,596); Tampa, FL
January 22, 2022; 3:00 pm, ESPN+		Temple	W 75–67 ^{OT}	14–5 (4–1)	Yuengling Center (2,177); Tampa, FL
January 26, 2022; 3:00 pm, ESPN+		at SMU	W 62–56	15–5 (5–1)	Moody Coliseum (674); Dallas, TX
January 30, 2022; 4:00 pm, ESPN+		at Houston	W 55–35	16–5 (6–1)	Fertitta Center (566); Houston, TX
February 6, 2022; 12:00 pm, ESPN+		Tulane	L 55–67	16–6 (6–2)	Yuengling Center (1,683); Tampa, FL
February 9, 2022; 7:00 pm, ESPN+		at Temple	W 49–40	17–6 (7–2)	Liacouras Center (1,436); Philadelphia, PA
February 13, 2022; 2:00 pm, ESPN2		UCF; War on I-4	L 33–54	17–7 (7–3)	Yuengling Center (2,086); Tampa, FL
February 16, 2022; 7:00 pm, ESPN+		Cincinnati	W 54–45	18–7 (8–3)	Yuengling Center (1,654); Tampa, FL
February 22, 2022; 7:00 pm, ESPN+		Wichita State; Rescheduled from January 9	W 61–57	19–7 (9–3)	Yuengling Center (1,628); Tampa, FL
February 24, 2022; 7:00 pm, ESPN+		at Wichita State	W 47–46	20–7 (10–3)	Charles Koch Arena (1,037); Wichita, KS
February 27, 2022; 1:00 pm, ESPN+		at East Carolina	W 68–60	21–7 (11–3)	Williams Arena (753); Greenville, NC
March 2, 2022; 7:00 pm, ESPN+		Houston	W 71–38	22–7 (12–3)	Yuengling Center (2,196); Tampa, FL
AAC Women's Tournament
March 8, 2022; 7:00 pm, ESPN+	(2)	vs. (7) Memphis; Quarterfinals	W 63–53	23–7	Dickies Arena; Fort Worth, TX
March 9, 2022; 7:00 pm, ESPN+	(2)	vs. (6) Houston; Semifinals	W 58–50	24–7	Dickies Arena; Fort Worth, TX
March 10, 2022; 9:00 pm, ESPNU	(2)	vs. (1) No. 25 UCF; Championship	L 45–53	24–8	Dickies Arena; Fort Worth, TX
NCAA Women's Tournament
March 19, 2022*; 11:30 am, ESPN2	(8 G)	vs. (9 G) Miami (FL); First Round	L 66–78	24–9	Colonial Life Arena; Columbia, SC
*Non-conference game. ^{#}Rankings from AP Poll. (#) Tournament seedings in parentheses. G=Greensboro. All times are in EST.

== Rankings ==
Regular season polls
Poll	Pre- season	Week 2	Week 3	Week 4	Week 5	Week 6	Week 7	Week 8	Week 9	Week 10	Week 11	Week 12	Week 13	Week 14	Week 15	Week 16	Week 17	Week 18	Final
AP	21	23	18	13	17	16	18	22	24	24	RV								
Coaches	22	-	20	17	19	16	16	23	24	24	RV	RV	RV	RV	RV	RV	RV	RV	RV

Legend
	Increase in ranking
	Decrease in ranking
	Not ranked previous week
(RV)	Received votes

Coaches' Poll did not release a second poll at the same time as the AP.

== See also ==
- 2021–22 South Florida Bulls men's basketball team
