= American Conference women's basketball tournament =

- Conference basketball championship
- Sport: College basketball
- Conference: American Conference
- Number of teams: 11
- Format: Single-elimination tournament
- Current stadium: Dickies Arena
- Current location: Fort Worth, Texas
- Played: 2014–present
- Last contest: 2025
- Current champion: South Florida (2025)
- Most championships: UConn (7)
- TV partner: ESPN/ESPN2/ESPNU/ESPN3
- Official website: theamerican.org/wbball

The American Conference women's basketball tournament (sometimes known simply as The American Championship) is the conference tournament in women's basketball for the American Conference.

== History ==
It is a single-elimination tournament that involves all league schools. Its seeding is based on regular season records. The winner receives the conference's automatic bid to the NCAA women's basketball tournament, however the official conference championship is awarded to the team or teams with the best regular season record. It was announced that an agreement was made to keep the tournament at the Mohegan Sun Arena through 2020.

== Champions ==
=== Finals ===
Year	Champion	Score	Runner-up	MVP	Venue
2014	UConn	72–52	Louisville	Breanna Stewart, UConn	Mohegan Sun Arena (Uncasville, CT)
2015	UConn	84–70	South Florida	Kaleena Mosqueda-Lewis, UConn	Mohegan Sun Arena (Uncasville, CT)
2016	UConn	77–51	South Florida	Breanna Stewart, UConn	Mohegan Sun Arena (Uncasville, CT)
2017	UConn	100–44	South Florida	Katie Lou Samuelson, UConn	Mohegan Sun Arena (Uncasville, CT)
2018	UConn	70–54	South Florida	Azurá Stevens, UConn	Mohegan Sun Arena (Uncasville, CT)
2019	UConn	66–45	UCF	Napheesa Collier, UConn	Mohegan Sun Arena (Uncasville, CT)
2020	UConn	87–53	Cincinnati	Megan Walker, UConn	Mohegan Sun Arena (Uncasville, CT)
2021	South Florida	64–54	UCF	Sydni Harvey, South Florida	Dickies Arena (Fort Worth, TX)
2022	UCF	53–45	South Florida	Diamond Battles, UCF	Dickies Arena (Fort Worth, TX)
2023	East Carolina	46–44	Houston	Synia Johnson, East Carolina	Dickies Arena (Fort Worth, TX)
2024	Rice	61–41	East Carolina	Malia Fisher, Rice	Dickies Arena (Fort Worth, TX)
2025	South Florida	69–62	Rice	Carla Britto, South Florida	Dickies Arena (Fort Worth, TX)
2026	UTSA	54-40	Rice	Cheyenne Rowe, UTSA	Legacy Arena (Birmingham, AL)
2027					Yuengling Center (Tampa, FL)
2028					Yuengling Center (Tampa, FL)

=== Championships by school ===
School	Titles	Winning years	Runner-up	Runner-up years
UConn	7	2014, 2015, 2016, 2017, 2018, 2019, 2020	0	
South Florida	2	2021, 2025	5	2015, 2016, 2017, 2018, 2022
UCF	1	2022	2	2019, 2021
East Carolina	1	2023	1	2024
Rice	1	2024	1	2025
UTSA	1	2026	0	
Cincinnati	0		1	2020
Houston	0		1	2023
Louisville	0		1	2014

Among current schools, Charlotte, Florida Atlantic, Memphis, North Texas, Temple, Tulane, Tulsa, UAB, and Wichita State have never won the conference tournament.

Italics indicate school no longer sponsors women's basketball in The American.

== See also ==
- American Athletic Conference men's basketball tournament
