= 2009–10 Tulane Green Wave women's basketball team =

Intercollegiate basketball season

2009–10 Tulane Green Wave women's basketball

Big Easy Classic champion DoubleTree Classic champion C-USA regular season champion C-USA Tournament champion
- Conference: Conference USA
- Record: 26–6 (15–4 C-USA)
- Head coach: Lisa Stockton
- Assistant coaches: Shondra Johnson; Alan Frey; Michele Savage
- Home arena: Fogelman Arena

2009–10 Conference USA women's basketball standings
	Conf.				Overall
Team	W		L	PCT	W		L	PCT
Tulane†	12	–	4	.750	26	–	7	.788
SMU	10	–	6	.625	20	–	11	.645
Memphis	10	–	6	.625	20	–	14	.588
Houston	10	–	6	.625	17	–	15	.531
East Carolina	9	–	7	.563	23	–	11	.676
UAB	8	–	8	.500	17	–	15	.531
Rice	7	–	9	.438	13	–	17	.433
UCF	7	–	9	.438	11	–	16	.407
UTEP	6	–	10	.375	16	–	16	.500
Marshall	6	–	10	.375	14	–	16	.467
Tulsa	6	–	10	.375	12	–	16	.429
Southern Miss	5	–	11	.313	9	–	21	.300
† 2010 C-USA tournament winner Rankings from AP poll

The 2009–10 Tulane Green Wave women's basketball team represented Tulane University in the 2009–10 NCAA Division I women's basketball season. The Green Wave were coached by Lisa Stockton. The Green Wave were a member of Conference USA.

== Offseason ==
- July 10: Tulane women's basketball announced the addition of Shondra Johnson to the coaching staff. The New Orleans native and all-SEC performer at Alabama was a member of the coaching staff at Samford University.
- August 14: Head coach Lisa Stockton announced an addition to the team. Janique Kautsky will join the program. The 5-10 guard/forward comes to Tulane from Perth, Australia.

== Regular season ==
- The Green Wave will participate in the Navy Classic from November 20–21. In addition, the club will participate in the Big Easy Classic on December 4 and 5. From December 28–29, the club will host the Tulane DoubleTree Classic.

=== Roster ===
Number	Name	Height	Position	Class
23	Tiffany Aidoo	5-9	Guard	Junior
11	Roshaunda Barnes	5-5	Guard	Junior
44	Brett Benzio	6-3	Center	Sophomore
32	Chassity Brown	5-7	Guard	Senior
21	Olivia Grayson	5-8	Guard	Freshman
33	Indira Kaljo	5-10	Guard	Senior
35	Brittany Lindsey	6-1	Forward	Redshirt Junior
31	Brittany Chantel McDonald	6-1	Forward	Freshman
20	Danielle Nunn	5-9	Guard	Junior
42	Jennifer Nwokedi	6-1	Forward	Sophomore
25	Tyria Snow	5-8	Guard	Freshman

=== Schedule ===
	Date	Time (CST)	Opponent	Location	TU points	Opp. points	Record
1	13 Nov 09	5:30 p.m.	vs Louisiana-Monroe	Fogelman Arena	86	52	1-0
2	20 Nov 09	3:45 p.m.	vs Liberty	Annapolis, MD	52	63	1-1
3	21 Nov 09	6:00 p.m.	vs Loyola (MD)	Annapolis, MD	58	43	2–1
4	25 Nov 09	7:00 p.m.	vs LSU	Fogelman Arena	73	65	2-2
5	1 Dec 09	7:00 p.m.	at South Alabama	Mobile, AL	73	71	3-2
6	4 Dec 09	7:00 p.m.	vs Prairie View A&M	Fogelman Arena	67	63	4-2
7	5 Dec 09	3:30 p.m.	vs Longwood	New Orleans, LA (Lakefront Arena)	73	58	5-2
8	28 Nov 09	6:00 p.m.	at USF	Tampa, FL	76	72	6-2
9	20 Dec 09	2:00 p.m.	vs Stephen F. Austin	Fogelman Arena	84	51	7-2
10	22 Dec 09	7:00 p.m.	vs McNeese State	Fogelman Arena	75	45	8-2
11	28 Dec 09	6:00 p.m.	vs Long Island	Fogelman Arena	82	59	9-2
12	29 Dec 09	8:00 p.m.	vs Texas Tech	Fogelman Arena	67	49	10-2
13	4 Jan 10	7:00 p.m.	at Southeastern Louisiana	Hammond, LA	81	45	11-2
14	8 Jan 10	7:00 p.m.	vs Houston*	Fogelman Arena	68	70	11–3
15	10 Jan 10	1:00 p.m.	vs Rice*	Fogelman Arena	82	60	12-3
16	15 Jan 10	7:00 p.m.	at Tulsa*	Tulsa, OK	58	55	13-3
17	17 Jan 10	2:00 p.m.	at SMU*	Dallas, TX	59	70	13-4
18	23 Jan 10	2:00 p.m.	vs Southern Miss*	Fogelman Arena	80	63	14-4
19	28 Jan 10	7:00 p.m.	vs UTEP*	Fogelman Arena	57	47	15-4
20	31 Jan 10	1:00 p.m.	at UCF*	Orlando, FL	72	70	16-4
21	5 Feb 10	7:00 p.m.	vs Tulsa*	Fogelman Arena	67	80	16-5
22	7 Feb 10	1:00 p.m.	vs SMU*	Fogelman Arena	78	59	17-5
23	11 Feb 10	6:00 p.m.	at Marshall*	Huntington, WV	64	54	18-5
24	13 Feb 10	12:00 p.m.	at East Carolina*	Greenville, NC	56	51	19-5
25	18 Feb 10	7:00 p.m.	vs Memphis*	Fogelman Arena	86	61	20-5
26	20 Feb 10	4:00 p.m.	vs UAB*	Fogelman Arena	64	56	21-5
27	25 Feb 10	7:00 p.m.	at Rice*	Houston, TX	81	69	22-5
28	27 Feb 10	2:00 p.m.	at Houston*	Houston, TX	74	62	22-6
29	3 Mar 10	8:05 p.m.	at UTEP*	El Paso, TX	66	64	23-6

* Conference USA Game

== Player stats ==
Player	Games played	Minutes	Field goals	Three pointers	Free throws	Rebounds	Assists	Blocks	Steals	Points

== Postseason ==
=== Conference USA Tournament ===
	Date	Time (CST)	Opponent	Location	TU points	Opp. points	Record
Q	9 Mar 10	12:00 p.m.	vs UCF	Tulsa, OK (Reynolds Center)	63	62	24-6
S	10 Mar 10	5:00 p.m.	vs East Carolina	Tulsa, OK (Reynolds Center)	73	64	25-6
F	12 Mar 10	12:30 p.m.	vs UAB	Tulsa, OK (Reynolds Center)	62	54	26-6

=== NCAA basketball tournament ===
Round	Date	Time (CST)	Opponent	Location	TU points	Opp. points	Record
1	20 Mar 10	9:30 p.m.	at Georgia	Tempe, AZ (Wells Fargo Arena)	49	54	26-7

== Awards and honors ==
- Chassity Brown, All C-USA Second Team
- Danielle Nunn, All C-USA Third Team
- Olivia Grayson, All C-USA Freshman Team
- Lisa Stockton, C-USA Coach of the Year

== Team players drafted into the WNBA ==
Round	Pick	Player	WNBA club

== See also ==
- Tulane Green Wave
