= 2022 American Athletic Conference women's basketball tournament =

U.S. college basketball tournament

- Classification: Division I
- Season: 2021–22
- Teams: 11
- Site: Dickies Arena; Fort Worth, Texas
- Champions: UCF (1st title)
- Winning coach: Katie Abrahamson-Henderson (1st title)
- MVP: Diamond Battles (UCF)
- Television: ESPN+, ESPNU

2021–22 American Athletic Conference women's basketball standings
	Conf.				Overall
Team	W		L	PCT	W		L	PCT
No. 24 UCF †	14	–	1	.933	26	–	4	.867
South Florida	12	–	3	.800	24	–	9	.727
Tulane	11	–	5	.688	21	–	10	.677
Temple	8	–	8	.500	13	–	15	.464
SMU	7	–	7	.500	14	–	15	.483
Houston	7	–	9	.438	18	–	16	.529
Memphis	6	–	9	.400	16	–	12	.571
Tulsa	5	–	8	.385	17	–	11	.607
Wichita State	5	–	11	.313	14	–	16	.467
East Carolina	4	–	11	.267	11	–	18	.379
Cincinnati	4	–	11	.267	11	–	17	.393
† 2022 AAC tournament winner Rankings from AP poll

The 2022 American Athletic Conference women's basketball tournament was held March 7–10, 2022, at Dickies Arena in Fort Worth, Texas. The first three rounds were streamed on ESPN+ with the championship game on ESPNU. UCF won the tournament and received the AAC automatic bid to the 2022 NCAA tournament.

== Seeds ==
With the COVID-19 pandemic in the United States ongoing and the possibility of cancelled games, teams were required to have played a minimum of 75% of the average number of conference games played in order to be seeded by winning percentage for the conference tournament. Teams were seeded by conference record, with tiebreakers used to seed teams with identical conference records. The top five teams received byes to the quarterfinals.

Seed	School	Conference Record	Tiebreaker
1	UCF	14–1	
2	South Florida	12–3	
3	Tulane	11–5	
4	Temple	8–8	
5	SMU	7–7	
6	Houston	7–9	
7	Memphis	7–10	
8	Tulsa	5–8	
9	Wichita State	5–11	
10	East Carolina	4–11	2–0 vs. Cincinnati
11	Cincinnati	4–11	0–2 vs. East Carolina

== Schedule ==
Game	Time	Matchup	Score	Television	Attendance
First round – March 7, 2022
1	2:00 PM	No. 8 Tulsa vs. No. 9 Wichita State	88–86 (OT)	ESPN+	TBD
2	4:00 PM	No. 7 Memphis vs. No. 10 East Carolina	59–48	ESPN+	TBD
3	6:00 PM	No. 6 Houston vs. No. 11 Cincinnati	67–45	ESPN+	TBD
Quarterfinals – March 8, 2022
4	12:00 PM	No. 1 UCF vs. No. 8 Tulsa	69–54	ESPN+	TBD
5	2:00 PM	No. 5 SMU vs. No. 4 Temple	63–55	ESPN+	TBD
6	6:00 PM	No. 2 South Florida vs. Memphis	63–53	ESPN+	TBD
7	8:00 PM	No. 3 Tulane vs. No. 6 Houston	65–57	ESPN+	TBD
Semifinals – March 9, 2022
8	2:00 PM	No. 1 UCF vs. No. 5 SMU	61–28	ESPN+	TBD
9	4:00 PM	No. 2 South Florida vs. No. 6 Houston	58–50	ESPN+	TBD
Championship – March 10, 2022
10	2:15 PM	No. 1 UCF vs No. 2 South Florida	53–45	ESPNU	TBD
*Game times in CT. ()-Rankings denote tournament seeding.

== Bracket ==
* – Denotes overtime period

First round Monday, March 7
8	Tulsa	88*
9	Wichita State	86
7	Memphis	59
10	East Carolina	48
6	Houston	67
11	Cincinnati	45

Quarterfinals; Tuesday, March 8
1	UCF	69
8	Tulsa	54
4	Temple	55
5	SMU	63
2	South Florida	63
7	Memphis	53
3	Tulane	57
6	Houston	65

Semifinals; Wednesday, March 9
1	UCF	61
5	SMU	28
2	South Florida	58
6	Houston	50

Championship; Thursday, March 10
1	UCF	53
2	South Florida	45

*Game times: CT

== See also ==
- 2022 American Athletic Conference men's basketball tournament
- American Athletic Conference men's basketball tournament
- American Athletic Conference
