= Lisa Stockton =

American basketball player and coach (born 1964)

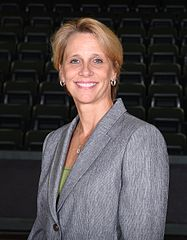
- Stockton in 2015

Biographical details
- Born: April 1, 1964 (age 62); Greensboro, North Carolina

Playing career
- 1983–1986: Wake Forest

Coaching career (HC unless noted)
- 1986–1987: North Carolina (asst.)
- 1987–1990: Greensboro
- 1990–1994: Georgia Tech (asst.)
- 1994–2024: Tulane

Head coaching record
- Overall: 654–369 (.639)

Accomplishments and honors

Championships
- 4× C-USA regular season (1997, 1999, 2007, 2010); 5× C-USA Tournament (1997, 1999, 2000, 2001, 2010)

Awards
- 2× C-USA Coach of the Year (2007, 2010); 2× Louisiana Coach of the Year (1995, 2010)

Lisa Dawn Stockton (born April 1) is a former American college basketball coach. She was the women's basketball head coach at Tulane University, born in Greensboro, North Carolina. She was named the Green Wave's 6th head basketball coach in 1994. As the winningest coach in Conference USA, she was named 2006–07 C-USA Coach of the Year, a distinction she again earned for the 2009–10 season.

Stockton announced her retirement following the 2023–24 basketball season. Stockton was inducted into the Tulane Hall of Fame in the fall of 2024.

== High school career ==
At Western Guilford High School, where Stockton graduated in 1982, she was all-conference four times and conference player of the year her senior year.

== College career ==
At Wake Forest, Stockton played women's basketball from 1983 to 1986. She scored 1,347 career points, ranking ninth on the program's all-time list. She led her team in assists the first two seasons. As a senior she scored 204 field goals, ranking eighth.

== After college ==
Though drafted by the National Women's Basketball Association, Stockton chose to coach instead, starting her career at Greensboro College.

== Head coaching record ==
Record table
Season	Team	Overall	Conference	Standing	Postseason
Greensboro Pride (Dixie Intercollegiate Athletic Conference) (1987–1990)
1987–88	Greensboro	20–7	10–4	T–2nd	
1988–89	Greensboro	25–12	9–3	T–2nd	
1989–90	Greensboro	18–8	8–2	T–1st	
Greensboro:		63–27 (.700)	27–9 (.750)		
Tulane Green Wave (Conference USA) (1994–2014)
1994–95	Tulane	19–10	9–3	2nd	NCAA First Round
1995–96	Tulane	21–10	9–5	T–2nd (Red)	NCAA First Round
1996–97	Tulane	27–5	12–2	1st (Red)	NCAA Second Round
1997–98	Tulane	21–7	12–4	2nd (Nat'l)	NCAA First Round
1998–99	Tulane	24–6	12–4	1st (Nat'l)	NCAA First Round
1999–00	Tulane	27–5	12–4	1st (Nat'l)	NCAA Second Round
2000–01	Tulane	22–10	12–4	1st (Nat'l)	NCAA First Round
2001–02	Tulane	24–11	8–6	5th	NCAA Second Round
2002–03	Tulane	19–10	8–6	T–3rd	NCAA First Round
2003–04	Tulane	10–18	3–11	T–11th	
2004–05	Tulane	11–16	3–11	T–12th	
2005–06	Tulane	15–12	8–8	T–6th	
2006–07	Tulane	26–7	13–3	1st	WNIT Second Round
2007–08	Tulane	16–14	6–10	T–9th	
2008–09	Tulane	18–14	9–7	6th	
2009–10	Tulane	26–7	12–4	1st	NCAA First Round
2010–11	Tulane	23–11	9–7	T–4th	WNIT Second Round
2011–12	Tulane	23–11	9–7	T–3rd	WNIT Second Round
2012–13	Tulane	24–9	11–5	3rd	WNIT Third Round
2013–14	Tulane	20–11	11–5	4th	WNIT First Round
Tulane Green Wave (American Athletic Conference) (2014–2024)
2014–15	Tulane	22–11	11–7	5th	NCAA First Round
2015–16	Tulane	23–12	11–7	5th	WNIT Third Round
2016–17	Tulane	18–15	7–9	T–5th	WNIT Third Round
2017–18	Tulane	14–17	5–11	T–8th	
2018–19	Tulane	15–15	5–11	T-8th	
2019–20	Tulane	14–17	8–8	5th	
2020–21	Tulane	18–9	12–6	4th	WNIT Second Round
2021–22	Tulane	21–10	11–5	3rd	WNIT Second Round
2022–23	Tulane	18–14	7–9	T–6th	WNIT First Round
2023–24	Tulane	12–20	3–15		
Tulane:		591–342 (.633)	268–203 (.569)		
Total:		654–369 (.639)			
National champion Postseason invitational champion Conference regular season champion Conference regular season and conference tournament champion Division regular season champion Division regular season and conference tournament champion Conference tournament champion

== See also ==
- List of college women's basketball career coaching wins leaders
