= Stony Brook Seawolves women's basketball =

American women's college basketball team

2025–26 Stony Brook Seawolves women's basketball team
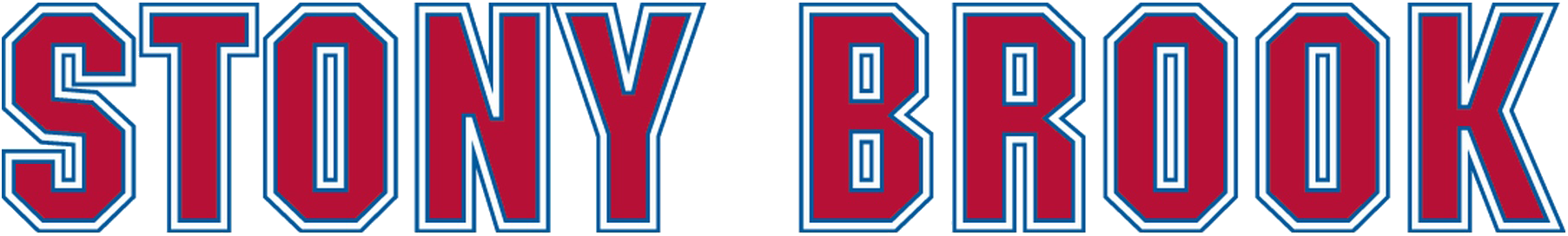
- University: Stony Brook University
- First season: 1969; 57 years ago
- Head coach: Joy McCorvey (2nd season)
- Location: Stony Brook, New York
- Arena: Stony Brook Arena (capacity: 4,160)
- Conference: Coastal Athletic Association
- Nickname: Seawolves
- Colors: Red, blue, and gray

NCAA Division I tournament appearances
- 2021

Conference tournament champions
- 2020, 2021

Conference regular-season champions
- 2020, 2024

Uniforms
Home	Away

The Stony Brook Seawolves women’s basketball team is the college basketball program representing Stony Brook University in Stony Brook, New York. The Seawolves currently participate as part of the NCAA Division I basketball, and compete in the Coastal Athletic Association. The Seawolves currently play their home games in the Stony Brook Arena.

Stony Brook reached the NCAA tournament for the first time in 2021, a year after the team's 28–3 season ended prematurely with the cancelation of the America East Championship and NCAA Tournament due to the COVID-19 pandemic.

== History ==
Stony Brook began play in the 1969–70 season at the Division III level. The program advanced to Division II beginning in the 1995–96 year, and fully transitioned to Division I in 1999, hiring Trish Roberts as head coach.

Stony Brook played two independent seasons as before joining the America East Conference in 2001. In Stony Brook's first America East season, the Seawolves finished in seventh place but earned two upsets in the tournament to advance to the finals. Stony Brook almost reached the NCAA Tournament but fell to Hartford 50–47. Roberts failed to reach double-digit victories in her next two seasons and resigned on August 25, 2004. She cited family issues but Newsday reported that several players left the team and Roberts clashed with first team All-Conference player Sherry Jordan.

Sacramento Monarchs assistant Maura McHugh was named interim head coach on September 10 and promoted to full-time head coach on April 26, 2005 after an 8–20 season. In McHugh's second season, Stony Brook won 20 games for the first time in program history and finished a program-best second place in the regular season. On December 2, 2005, Stony Brook played No. 19 Temple, its first ranked opponent in program history, and pulled the 58–56 upset. The Seawolves lost in the conference semifinals but qualified for the WNIT, where they lost to Hofstra in the program's first-ever postseason appearance. After another second-place finish in the conference regular season in 2006–07 at 14–2, the Seawolves were upset by UMBC in the quarterfinals and McHugh resigned three months later.

McHugh's assistant Michele Cherry was named her successor, but Cherry suffered three straight 20-loss seasons and was on course for a fourth before she resigned in the middle of the 2010–11 campaign, leading assistant Evelyn Thompson to handle head coaching duties for the remainder of the season.

On April 7, 2011, Canisius associate head coach Beth O'Boyle was named Stony Brook's fourth Division I head coach. O'Boyle went 4–26 in her first season and improved by 10 wins in each of the next two years. She won a program record 24 games in 2013–14 as Stony Brook returned to the America East Championship for the first time since 2002, but were blown out 70–46 by Albany. Stony Brook qualified for the 2014 WNIT and lost to Michigan 86–48 in Ann Arbor. The Wolverines' head coach was former Stony Brook player Kim Barnes Arico. On April 28, 2014, O'Boyle resigned to accept the head coaching position at VCU.

On June 15, 2014, Auburn assistant head coach Caroline McCombs was named as O'Boyle's successor. In McCombs' first two seasons, Stony Brook finished with 17 wins and in third place in the America East, earning bids to the WBI both times, losing to Siena in 2015 and Youngstown State in 2016. McCombs became the program's all-time winningest head coach on November 21, 2018 with her 67th win, surpassing Roberts. Stony Brook won its first game against a Power Five school by defeating Penn State 81–70 on November 25, 2018. Her first 20-win season came in 2018–19 but ended in the America East semifinals with a loss to Hartford. McCombs reached 100 career victories on January 2, 2020.

The 2019–20 season saw Stony Brook shatter program records, at one point owning a 22-game winning streak, the longest in the nation. Stony Brook defeated Pittsburgh in December for its second program Power Five victory. The Seawolves won their first America East regular season title after defeating Vermont to improve to 25–1 and 13–0 in conference. As the top seed, Stony Brook advanced to the America East Championship with a 28–3 record, set to face Maine at home, but the game was canceled a day before as the COVID-19 pandemic began to sweep through the United States. The Seawolves still earned the America East title as the highest seed remaining.

Stony Brook earned its redemption in the 2020–21 season. The Seawolves, as the second seed in the America East Tournament, earned a bye to the semifinals, routing UMass Lowell to set up a championship rematch with top-seeded Maine. On the road, Stony Brook came back from an 11-point deficit to upset Maine 64–60 and clinch its first trip to the NCAA Tournament in program history. Stony Brook lost 79–44 to Arizona in the first round. McCombs announced on April 2, 2021 that she would be leaving Stony Brook after seven years to be George Washington's new head coach.

On April 28, 2021, James Madison assistant Ashley Langford was hired to replace McCombs. In Langford's first season, Stony Brook finished 23–6 with wins over St. John's, Rutgers and Washington State. However, Stony Brook was banned from the America East tournament because the team announced it would be leaving the conference to join the Colonial Athletic Association (CAA). Stony Brook was invited to the WNIT, losing at VCU 56–48. In 2022–23, Stony Brook finished 18–13 in its first CAA season, losing to Northeastern in the second round of the conference tournament. Stony Brook won the 2023–24 CAA regular season title by going 25–3 overall and 16–2 in conference.

== Postseason ==
=== NCAA tournament results ===
The Seawolves have appeared in the NCAA Division I women's basketball tournament one time. Their overall combined record is 0–1.

Year	Seed	Round	Opponent	Result
2021	#14	First Round	#3 Arizona	L 44−79

=== WBIT results ===
The Seawolves played in the inaugural Women's Basketball Invitation Tournament (WBIT) in 2024. Their combined record is 1–1.

Year	Round	Opponent	Result
2024	First Round; Second Round	#1 James Madison; Illinois	W 81–70; L 62–79

=== WNIT results ===
The Seawolves achieved their first Women's National Invitation Tournament (WNIT) appearance in 2006. Their overall combined WNIT record is 0–3.

Year	Round	Opponent	Result
2006	First Round	Hofstra	L 65–92
2014	First Round	Michigan	L 48–86
2022	First Round	VCU	L 48–56

=== WBI results ===
The Seawolves have appeared in the Women's Basketball Invitational (WBI) two times. Their overall combined WBI record is 0–2.

Year	Round	Opponent	Result
2015	First Round	Siena	L 46–53
2016	First Round	Youngstown State	L 60–67

== Season-by-season results ==
Record table
Season	Coach	Overall	Conference	Standing	Postseason
Trish Roberts (Independent / America East) (1999–2004)
1999–00	Trish Roberts	18–10			
2000–01	Trish Roberts	16–12			
2001–02	Trish Roberts	16–14	7–9	7th	
2002–03	Trish Roberts	9–19	7–9	T–4th	
2003–04	Trish Roberts	7–21	6–12	T–8th	
Maura McHugh (America East) (2004–2007)
2004–05	Maura McHugh	8–20	6–12	9th	
2005–06	Maura McHugh	20–10	12–4	2nd	WNIT First Round
2006–07	Maura McHugh	18–11	14–2	2nd	
Michele Cherry (America East) (2007–2011)
2007–08	Michele Cherry	8–23	2–14	9th	
2008–09	Michele Cherry	6–23	4–12	7th	
2009–10	Michele Cherry	10–20	7–9	T–4th	
2010–11	Michele Cherry; Evelyn Thompson	7–23	3–13	8th	
Beth O'Boyle (America East) (2011–2014)
2011–12	Beth O'Boyle	4–26	1–15	9th	
2012–13	Beth O'Boyle	14–16	6–10	T–4th	
2013–14	Beth O'Boyle	24–9	13–3	2nd	WNIT First Round
Caroline McCombs (America East) (2014–2021)
2014–15	Caroline McCombs	17–14	10–6	3rd	WBI First Round
2015–16	Caroline McCombs	17–15	8–8	T–3rd	WBI First Round
2016–17	Caroline McCombs	12–18	5–11	8th	
2017–18	Caroline McCombs	18–12	10–6	T–3rd	
2018–19	Caroline McCombs	23–8	11–5	3rd	
2019–20	Caroline McCombs	28–3	14–2	1st	Postseason canceled due to COVID-19
2020–21	Caroline McCombs	15–6	11–3	2nd	NCAA First Round
Ashley Langford (America East / CAA) (2021–2024)
2021–22	Ashley Langford	23–6	14–4	2nd	WNIT First Round
2022–23	Ashley Langford	18–13	11–7	6th	
2023–24	Ashley Langford	28–5	16–2	1st	WBIT Second Round
Joy McCorvey (CAA) (2024–present)
2024–25	Joy McCorvey	0–0	0–0		
Total:		381–355 (.518)			
National champion Postseason invitational champion Conference regular season champion Conference regular season and conference tournament champion Division regular season champion Division regular season and conference tournament champion Conference tournament champion

== Conference awards ==
=== Coach of the Year ===
Coach	Year	Conference
Ashley Langford	2024	CAA
Caroline McCombs	2020	America East

=== Player of the Year ===
Player	Year	Conference
Gigi Gonzalez	2024	CAA
Mykeema Ford	2007	America East

America East Defensive Player of the Year

- Dana Ferraro – 2006
- Chikilra Goodman – 2014

America East Rookie of the Year

- Jessica Smith – 2004
- Ogechi Anyagaligbo – 2016

America East Sixth Player of the Year

- McKenzie Bushee – 2021

=== All-Conference First Team ===
Player	Years	Conference
Gigi Gonzalez	2024	CAA
Annie Warren	2022, 2023	America East, CAA
India Pagan	2020	America East
Jerell Matthews	2019	America East
Shania Johnson	2018, 2019	America East
Sabre Proctor	2014, 2015	America East
Chikilra Goodman	2014	America East
Jessica Smith	2007	America East
Mykeema Ford	2006, 2007	America East
Sherry Jordan	2002, 2003	America East

America East All-Conference Defensive Team

- Dana Ferraro – 2006, 2008
- Jessica Smith – 2007
- Kirsten Jeter – 2011
- Chikilra Goodman – 2014
- Jessica Ogunnorin – 2015
- Christina Scognamiglio – 2017
- Cheyenne Clark – 2020
- Hailey Zeise – 2021
