= Katie Abrahamson-Henderson =

American basketball player and coach (born 1966)

Biographical details
- Born: December 23, 1966 (age 59); Cedar Rapids, Iowa, U.S.

Playing career
- 1986–1988: Georgia
- 1988–1990: Iowa
- Position: Power Forward

Coaching career (HC unless noted)
- 1990–1992: Duquesne (asst.)
- 1992–1994: Maine (asst.)
- 1994–2000: Iowa State (asst.)
- 2000–2002: Michigan State (assoc. HC)
- 2002–2007: Missouri State
- 2007–2008: Washington (asst.)
- 2008–2010: Indiana (assoc. HC)
- 2010–2016: Albany
- 2016–2022: UCF
- 2022–2026: Georgia

Head coaching record
- Overall: 440–216 (.671)

Accomplishments and honors

Championships
- 4× America East regular season (2013–2016); 5× America East tournament (2012–2016) American Athletic Conference regular season (2022) American Athletic Conference tournament (2022)

Kay Noel "Katie" Abrahamson-Henderson (born December 23, 1966) is the former head coach of the University of Georgia's women's basketball team.

== Early life ==
Abrahamson-Henderson attended Washington High School in Cedar Rapids, Iowa, graduating in 1985. She was a basketball player, averaging 44 points per game and earning a place (1992) in the Washington Warriors Hall of Fame. She was named an All-American on both the Parade and USA Today teams, and ranked as one of the top five basketball players in the nation as a senior. She was also on the swim team, and considered attending college as a swimmer, but instead chose to focus on basketball. While in high school, she competed in the Iowa State Championships and placed first in the 50 yard freestyle, the 100 yard freestyle, and the freestyle relay.

== College ==
Many schools recruited Katie Abrahamson; she eventually chose to attend the University of Georgia, to play for Andy Landers, now a Women's Basketball Hall of Fame coach. In her freshman year, 1986, she helped the team win the Southeastern Conference title. She played one more year at Georgia, but then chose to transfer back to her home state and play at Iowa for Hall of Fame coach C. Vivian Stringer. She played for the Hawkeyes for two years, advancing to the NCAA Sweet Sixteen as a senior. Abrahamson-Henderson completed her studies at Iowa, receiving a B.S. in physical education and sports administration in 1990. After graduating from Iowa, she attended Duquesne University, where she earned an M.S. in education in 1992. She spent one year playing professional basketball in New Zealand.

== Coaching career ==
While playing basketball in high school and college, Abrahamson-Henderson had no interest in pursuing a coaching career, expecting instead to become a fitness trainer or run a fitness club. However, while she was at graduate school at Duquesne University, one of the assistant coaches at Iowa became the head coach at Duquesne and talked her into being a graduate assistant coach for the team.

She then went to the University of Maine to be an assistant coach for two years under Joanne McCallie. After Maine, she spent six years as an assistant coach at Iowa State under Bill Fennelly, working alongside Brenda Frese who would go on to become the head coach at Maryland. When McCallie took over the head coaching position at Michigan State, she persuaded Abrahamson-Henderson to join her as an associate head coach.

Abrahamson-Henderson took her first head coaching position at Missouri State (then Southwest Missouri State). She helped lead the team to two regular-season championships in the Missouri Valley Conference as well as three postseason conference championships. The team made three appearances in the NCAA tournament and won the WNIT in 2005. Following the 2007 season she unexpectedly resigned, and went on to accept an assistant coaching position at the University of Washington. After a single year at Washington, Indiana's head coach Felisha Legette-Jack hired her as the associate head coach.

In 2010, the University of Albany persuaded Abrahamson-Henderson to become its head coach; she remained for six years. Albany had a losing record in each of the five prior years, but Abrahamson-Henderson improved the team to 16–14 in her first year. In her second year, the team improved to finish second in the America East conference and earn a trip to the NCAA tournament. They finished first or tied for first in the conference each of the next four years, winning the conference tournament championship and an invitation to the NCAAs every year. In 2016 NCAAs, they upset fifth-seeded Florida, 61–59.

In 2016, the University of Central Florida persuaded Abrahamson-Henderson to become its new head coach. Similar to Albany, UCF had 5 consecutive losing seasons prior to Coach Abe's hiring, including a 7-23 record in 2015-16. Coach Abe would improve her squad instantly: a 21-12 record her first year, with a second round appearance in the WNIT. By her third year in 2018-19, UCF would go 26-7 and finish second place in the conference, earning their first NCAA Tournament bid since the 2010-11 season. In the 2021-22 season, Coach Abe would lead the Knights to their first regular season championship since 2004-05, and their first tournament championship since 2010-11 with a 53-45 victory over USF. That season, UCF would be ranked in both polls for the first time in school history.

On March 26, 2022, she was announced as the third head coach in program history at the University of Georgia. Abrahamson-Henderson left UGA in April 2026.

== Head coaching record ==
Record table
Season	Team	Overall	Conference	Standing	Postseason
Missouri State Lady Bears (Missouri Valley Conference) (2002–2007)
2002–03	Southwest Missouri State	18–13	11–7	4th	NCAA First Round
2003–04	Southwest Missouri State	28–4	16–2	1st	NCAA First Round
2004–05	Southwest Missouri State	25–8	15–3	1st	WNIT Champion
2005–06	Missouri State	17–15	7–11	T–6th	NCAA First Round
2006–07	Missouri State	7–21	3–15	10th	
Missouri State:		95–61 (.609)	52–38 (.578)		
Albany Great Danes (America East Conference) (2010–2016)
2010–11	Albany	16–14	9–7	5th	
2011–12	Albany	23–10	14–2	2nd	NCAA First Round
2012–13	Albany	27–4	17–0	1st	NCAA First Round
2013–14	Albany	28–5	15–1	1st	NCAA First Round
2014–15	Albany	24–9	14–2	T–1st	NCAA First Round
2015–16	Albany	28–5	15–1	T–1st	NCAA Second Round
Albany:		145–47 (.755)	84–13 (.866)		
UCF Knights (American Athletic Conference) (2016–2022)
2016–17	UCF	21–12	9–7	4th	WNIT Second Round
2017–18	UCF	22–11	12–4	3rd	WNIT Second Round
2018–19	UCF	26–7	13–3	2nd	NCAA First Round
2019–20	UCF	20–10	11–5	2nd	No postseason - COVID-19
2020–21	UCF	16–5	12–2	2nd	NCAA First Round
2021–22	UCF	26–4	14–1	1st	NCAA Second Round
UCF:		131–49 (.728)	68–26 (.723)		
Georgia Bulldogs (SEC) (2022–2026)
2022–23	Georgia	22–12	9–7	T–5th	NCAA Second Round
2023–24	Georgia	12–18	3–13	13th	
2024–25	Georgia	13–19	4–12	12th	
2025–26	Georgia	22–10	8–8	T–6th	NCAA First Round
Georgia:		69–59 (.539)	24–40 (.375)		
Total:		440–216 (.671)			
National champion Postseason invitational champion Conference regular season champion Conference regular season and conference tournament champion Division regular season champion Division regular season and conference tournament champion Conference tournament champion
