= Western Guilford High School =

American public school in North Carolina

Location
- 409 Friendway Rd; Greensboro, North Carolina 27410; United States; 36°04′56″N 79°54′29″W

Information
- School type: Public
- Established: 1968 (58 years ago)
- School district: Guilford County Schools
- CEEB code: 341675
- Principal: Keith Barnett
- Teaching staff: 73.46 (FTE)
- Grades: 9–12
- Enrollment: 1,243 (2024–2025)
- Student to teacher ratio: 16.92
- Colors: Black and gold
- Team name: Hornets
- Website: westernhs.gcsnc.com

Western Guilford High School is located in Greensboro, North Carolina, and is part of the Guilford County School system. The school has approximately 1,300 students, and its sports teams are the Fighting Hornets.

The school opened in the fall of 1968.

In September 2000, Western Guilford was renovated via public bond. The design of the new addition integrates different components of the campus by introducing new circulation patterns. A new entry gallery at the front entry to the school was designed, along with art and classroom additions that form an internal courtyard. The addition consists of four basic elements: Classroom addition to the vocational building, a new "auxiliary" gym, a two-story classroom addition, and a single-story art addition.

Keith Barnett is the principal of Western Guilford High. The Student-Teacher ratio is 18:1. The school's mascot is Buzz the Hornet, and the school colors are Black and Old Gold. Western is a member of the Metro 6A Conference, and the Athletic Director is Jerrod Harris.

Beginning the program in 2014, Western Guilford High School was North Carolina's first high school to offer College Board's AP Capstone Program. The AP Capstone Program, also known as the Advanced Placement Academy, is a challenging two-year program designed to train students for the independent research and collaborative projects common in college-level courses.

== Advanced Placement Academy ==
The Advanced Placement Capstone Academy was an option for students since the fall of 2014. Western Guilford is the first school in North Carolina to offer the College Board-approved AP Capstone Program. Students can apply to take part in various programs of study, such as AP Seminar and AP Research.

All Advanced Placement Academy students participate in enrichment sessions throughout the year. Sessions utilize SpringBoard materials to assist students in preparing for collegiate-level writing, test-taking, test-data analysis, college planning, and career exploration.

== Service Learning ==
- Service Learning Diploma: awarded to students who have completed a minimum of 200 hours of service learning in their high school years.
- Service Learning Exemplary Award: awarded to students who have completed a minimum of 100 hours of service learning in their high school years.
- The school has a group of 8 Service-Learning Ambassadors with a goal of promoting Service-Learning and hosting school-wide service projects.

== Athletics ==
- Baseball
- Basketball
- Cheerleading
- Cross country
- Football
- Golf
- Lacrosse
- Soccer
- Softball
- Swimming
- Tennis
- Track
- Volleyball
- Wrestling

== Demographics ==
- 47% Black
- 22% Hispanic
- 21% White
- 6% Multi-Racial
- 4% Asian
- <1.0% American Indian
- <1.0% Native Islander

== Notable alumni ==
- Saundra Baron — soccer goalkeeper, member of Trinidad and Tobago women's national team
- Lisa Stockton — women's college basketball head coach
