= 2020–21 Tulane Green Wave women's basketball team =

2020–21 Tulane Green Wave women's basketball

WNIT, Second Round
- Conference: American Athletic Conference
- Record: 18–9 (12–6 The American)
- Head coach: Lisa Stockton (27th season)
- Assistant coaches: Alan Frey; Chandra Dorsey; Olivia Grayson
- Home arena: Devlin Fieldhouse

2020–21 American Athletic Conference women's basketball standings
| | Conf. | | | | Overall |
| Team | W | | L | PCT | W | | L | PCT |
|---|---|---|---|---|---|---|---|---|
| No. 19 South Florida † | 13 | – | 2 | .867 | 19 | – | 4 | .826 |
| UCF | 12 | – | 2 | .857 | 16 | – | 5 | .762 |
| Houston | 12 | – | 5 | .706 | 17 | – | 8 | .680 |
| Tulane | 12 | – | 6 | .667 | 18 | – | 9 | .667 |
| Temple | 11 | – | 7 | .611 | 11 | – | 11 | .500 |
| East Carolina | 6 | – | 10 | .375 | 8 | – | 14 | .364 |
| Cincinnati | 6 | – | 12 | .333 | 8 | – | 16 | .333 |
| Tulsa | 4 | – | 13 | .235 | 5 | – | 14 | .263 |
| Wichita State | 2 | – | 9 | .182 | 6 | – | 12 | .333 |
| Memphis | 2 | – | 12 | .143 | 4 | – | 15 | .211 |
| SMU | 0 | – | 2 | .000 | 0 | – | 6 | .000 |
† 2021 AAC tournament winner SMU suspended their season on December 29, 2020; The American has declared a forfeit win for USF against Memphis for conference-standings purposes only as a result of the scheduled game from Jan. 17 that was not played. The teams' overall records are not affected. As of July 7, 2024; Rankings from AP poll

The 2020–21 Tulane Green Wave women's basketball team represented Tulane University during the 2020–21 NCAA Division I women's basketball season. The Green Wave, led by twenty-seventh year head coach Lisa Stockton, played their home games at Devlin Fieldhouse and were seventh year members of the American Athletic Conference.

== Media ==
All Green Wave games will be broadcast on WRBH 88.3 FM. A video stream for all home games will be on Tulane All-Access, ESPN3, or AAC Digital. Road games will typically be streamed on the opponents website, though conference road games could also appear on ESPN3 or AAC Digital.

== Roster ==
2020–21 Tulane Green Wave women's basketball team
Players
Coaches

| Pos. | # | Name | Height | Year | Previous school | Hometown |
|---|---|---|---|---|---|---|
| G | 0 | Arsula Clark | 5 ft 9 in (1.75 m) | Sr | Douglasville HS; Louisiana–Monroe | Miami, FL |
| G | 1 | Kaila Anderson | 5 ft 5 in (1.65 m) | Sr | University Lab | Kenner, LA |
| G | 2 | Erin Gutierrez | 5 ft 9 in (1.75 m) | Jr | Nova | Pembroke Pines, FL |
| G | 11 | Salma Bates | 5 ft 7 in (1.7 m) | So | John Curtis Christian | Kenner, LA |
| G | 12 | Sierra Cheatham | 6 ft 0 in (1.83 m) | Sr | Clear Springs | Houston, TX |
| G | 14 | Dynah Jones | 5 ft 9 in (1.75 m) | Jr | John Curtis | New Orleans, LA |
| F | 15 | Anijah Bates | 6 ft 3 in (1.91 m) | So | Oak Ridge | Orlando, FL |
| F | 21 | Irina Parau | 6 ft 1 in (1.85 m) | So | Nicolae Balcescu | Cluj-Napoca, Romania |
| F | 22 | McKenzi Carter | 6 ft 1 in (1.85 m) | Fr | Fort Worth Country Day | Fort Worth, TX |
| F | 23 | Krystal Freeman | 6 ft 0 in (1.83 m) | Sr | Pineville | Pineville, LA |
| G | 24 | Chiara Gratini | 5 ft 7 in (1.7 m) | Fr | | Turin, Italy |
| G | 25 | JerKaila Jordan | 5 ft 9 in (1.75 m) | Fr | John Curtis Christian | New Orleans, LA |
| F | 30 | Dene' Mimms | 6 ft 5 in (1.96 m) | RS So | Warren Easton Charter | New Orleans, LA |
| F | 42 | Mia Heide | 6 ft 3 in (1.91 m) | Jr | Austin | Austin, TX |

Head coach

- Lisa Stockton (Wake Forest)

Assistant coach(es)

- Alan Frey (New Orleans)
- Chandra Dorsey (Mississippi)
- Olivia Grayson (Tulane)

Legend

- (C) Team captain
- (S) Suspended
- (I) Ineligible
- (W) Walk-on
- Injured
- Current redshirt

Roster

== Schedule and results ==
| Date time, TV | Rank^{#} | Opponent^{#} | Result | Record | Site (attendance) city, state |
Regular season
| Nov 25, 2020*; 7:00 pm, ESPN+ | | Nicholls State | W 88–43 | 1–0 | Devlin Fieldhouse (100); New Orleans, LA |
| Nov 27, 2020*; 5:00 pm | | Texas Southern | Canceled | | Devlin Fieldhouse; New Orleans, LA |
| Dec 1, 2020*; 12:00 pm, ESPN+ | | at South Alabama | W 77–73 | 2–0 | Mitchell Center (263); Mobile, AL |
| Dec 3, 2020*; 5:00 pm, ACCNX | | at Georgia Tech | L 51–55 | 2–1 | McCamish Pavilion (1,200); Atlanta, GA |
| Dec 6, 2020*; 2:00 pm | | Southeastern Louisiana | Postponed | | Devlin Fieldhouse; New Orleans, LA |
| Dec 9, 2020*; 6:30 pm | | at Middle Tennessee | W 81–78 | 3–1 | Murphy Center; Murfreesboro, TN |
| Dec 15, 2020; 5:00 pm, ESPN+ | | at UCF | L 62–66 | 3–2 (0–1) | Addition Financial Arena (898); Orlando, FL |
| Dec 19, 2020*; 5:00 pm, ESPN+ | | Southeastern Louisiana | W 70–54 | 4–2 | Devlin Fieldhouse (10); New Orleans, LA |
| Dec 22, 2020; 11:00 am, ESPN+ | | at East Carolina | L 64–72 | 4–3 (0–2) | Williams Arena at Minges Coliseum (17); Greenville, NC |
| Dec 30, 2020; 6:00 pm | | Temple | Postponed | | Devlin Fieldhouse; New Orleans, LA |
| Jan 2, 2021; 5:00 pm, ESPN+ | | Memphis | W 80–44 | 5–3 (1–2) | Devlin Fieldhouse (100); New Orleans, LA |
| Jan 6, 2021; 3:00 pm, ESPN+ | | at Houston | W 76–62 | 6–3 (2–2) | Fertitta Center; Houston, TX |
| Jan 9, 2021; 1:00 pm, ESPN+ | | at Cincinnati | W 68–49 | 7–3 (3–2) | Fifth Third Arena; Cincinnati, OH |
| Jan 13, 2021; 6:00 pm, ESPN+ | | No. 16 South Florida | L 53–72 | 7–4 (3–3) | Devlin Fieldhouse (100); New Orleans, LA |
| Jan 16, 2021; 1:00 pm, ESPN+ | | at Tulsa | W 65–54 | 8–4 (4–3) | Reynolds Center (100); Tulsa, OK |
| Jan 23, 2021; 1:00 pm | | SMU | Canceled | | Devlin Fieldhouse; New Orleans, LA |
| Jan 27, 2021; 6:00 pm, ESPN+ | | Houston | L 64–71 | 8–5 (4–4) | Devlin Fieldhouse; New Orleans, LA |
| Jan 30, 2021; 12:00 pm, ESPN+ | | Temple | W 80–44 | 9–5 (5–4) | Devlin Fieldhouse; New Orleans, LA |
| Jan 31, 2021; 11:00 am, ESPNU | | Temple | W 71–69 | 10–5 (6–4) | Devlin Fieldhouse; New Orleans, LA |
| Feb 3, 2021; 3:00 pm, ESPN+ | | at Wichita State | W 57–55 | 11–5 (7–4) | Charles Koch Arena (1,078); Wichita, KS |
| Feb 7, 2021; 2:00 pm, ESPN+ | | Cincinnati | W 61–59 | 12–5 (8–4) | Devlin Fieldhouse; New Orleans, LA |
| Feb 10, 2021; 3:30 pm, ESPN+ | | Tulsa | W 64–47 | 13–5 (9–4) | Devlin Fieldhouse; New Orleans, LA |
| Feb 13, 2021; 7:00 pm, ESPN+ | | Wichita State | W 79–63 | 14–5 (10–4) | Devlin Fieldhouse; New Orleans, LA |
| Feb 14, 2021; 1:00 pm | | at SMU | Canceled | | Moody Coliseum; Dallas, TX |
| Feb 17, 2021; 6:00 pm, ESPN+ | | UCF | L 61–63 | 14–6 (10–5) | Devlin Fieldhouse; New Orleans, LA |
| Feb 20, 2021; 6:00 pm, ESPN+ | | at No. 12 South Florida | L 69–78 | 14–7 (10–6) | Yuengling Center (479); Tampa, FL |
| Feb 23, 2021; 6:30 pm, ESPN+ | | at Memphis | W 72–52 | 15–7 (11–6) | Elma Roane Fieldhouse (207); Memphis, TN |
| Mar 2, 2021; 6:00 pm, ESPN+ | | East Carolina | W 77–60 | 16–7 (12–6) | Devlin Fieldhouse; New Orleans, LA |
AAC Women's Tournament
| Mar 9, 2021; 11:00 am, ESPN+ | (4) | vs. (5) Temple | W 83–73 | 17–7 | Dickies Arena; Fort Worth, TX |
| Mar 10, 2021; 4:30 pm, ESPN+ | (4) | vs. (1) No. 20 South Florida | L 47–51 | 17–8 | Dickies Arena; Fort Worth, TX |
WNIT
| Mar 19, 2021; 8:00 pm, FloSports | | vs. Illinois; First Round | W 75–67 | 18–8 | My Town Movers Fieldhouse; Collierville, TN |
| Mar 20, 2021; 8:00 pm, FloSports | | vs. Ole Miss; Second Round | L 61–72 | 18–9 | My Town Movers Fieldhouse; Collierville, TN |
*Non-conference game. ^{#}Rankings from AP Poll. (#) Tournament seedings in parentheses. All times are in Central Time.

== Rankings ==
| + Regular season polls | Poll | Pre- Season | Week 2 | Week 3 | Week 4 | Week 5 | Week 6 | Week 7 | Week 8 | Week 9 | Week 10 | Week 11 | Week 12 | Week 13 | Week 14 | Week 15 | Week 16 | Week 17 | Week 18 | Week 19 | Final |
| AP | | | | | | | | | | | | | | | | | | | | | |
| Coaches | | | | | | | | | | | | | | | | | | | | | |

Legend
| | Increase in ranking |
| | Decrease in ranking |
| | Not ranked previous week |
| (RV) | Received Votes |

== See also ==
- 2020–21 Tulane Green Wave men's basketball team
