= 2021–22 UCF Knights women's basketball team =

Intercollegiate basketball season

2021–22 UCF Knights women's basketball

Cancún Challenge Riviera Division champions AAC regular season & tournament champions

NCAA tournament, second round
- Conference: American Athletic Conference

Ranking
- Coaches: No. 24
- AP: No. 24
- Record: 26–3 (14–1 The American)
- Head coach: Katie Abrahamson-Henderson (6th season)
- Assistant coaches: Tahnee Balerio; Nykesha Sales; Isoken Uzamere
- Home arena: Addition Financial Arena

2021–22 American Athletic Conference women's basketball standings
| | Conf. | | | | Overall |
| Team | W | | L | PCT | W | | L | PCT |
|---|---|---|---|---|---|---|---|---|
| No. 24 UCF † | 14 | – | 1 | .933 | 26 | – | 4 | .867 |
| South Florida | 12 | – | 3 | .800 | 24 | – | 9 | .727 |
| Tulane | 11 | – | 5 | .688 | 21 | – | 10 | .677 |
| Temple | 8 | – | 8 | .500 | 13 | – | 15 | .464 |
| SMU | 7 | – | 7 | .500 | 14 | – | 15 | .483 |
| Houston | 7 | – | 9 | .438 | 18 | – | 16 | .529 |
| Memphis | 6 | – | 9 | .400 | 16 | – | 12 | .571 |
| Tulsa | 5 | – | 8 | .385 | 17 | – | 11 | .607 |
| Wichita State | 5 | – | 11 | .313 | 14 | – | 16 | .467 |
| East Carolina | 4 | – | 11 | .267 | 11 | – | 18 | .379 |
| Cincinnati | 4 | – | 11 | .267 | 11 | – | 17 | .393 |
† 2022 AAC tournament winner Rankings from AP poll

The 2021–22 UCF Knights women's basketball team represented the University of Central Florida during the 2021–22 NCAA Division I basketball season. The Knights compete in Division I of the National Collegiate Athletic Association (NCAA) and the American Athletic Conference (The American). The Knights, in the program's 45th season of basketball, were led by sixth-year head coach Katie Abrahamson-Henderson, and play their home games at the Addition Financial Arena on the university's main campus in Orlando, Florida.

The Knights finished their regular season 22–3 and were American Athletic Conference champions at 14–1, winning the conference tournament and an automatic bid to the 2022 NCAA Division I women's basketball tournament, where they defeated Florida in the first round before losing to UConn in the second round.

== Roster ==
2021–22 UCF Knights women's basketball team
Players
Coaches

| Pos. | # | Name | Height | Year | Previous school | Hometown |
|---|---|---|---|---|---|---|
| G | 0 | Laila Jewett | 5 ft 10 in (1.78 m) | Fr | Bishop Ireton | Woodbridge, VA |
| G | 1 | Tay Sanders | 6 ft 1 in (1.85 m) | Sr | Bartow; Chipola | Bartow, FL |
| G | 3 | Diamond Battles | 5 ft 8 in (1.73 m) | Sr | Winter Haven | Winter Haven, FL |
| G | 4 | Kiera Brown | 5 ft 9 in (1.75 m) | RS Jr | Palm Beach Gardens | Rivera Beach, FL |
| F | 5 | Masseny Kaba | 6 ft 3 in (1.91 m) | Sr | Cathedral | Dorchester, MA |
| G | 11 | Becca Ripley | 6 ft 0 in (1.83 m) | RS Sr | New Hampton | Stratham, NH |
| G | 14 | Asia Todd | 5 ft 9 in (1.75 m) | Jr | Clayton; Liberty | Clayton, NC |
| G | 23 | Alisha Lewis | 5 ft 7 in (1.7 m) | Jr | Strath Haven; Syracuse | Wallingford, PA |
| F | 24 | Jnaya Walker | 6 ft 1 in (1.85 m) | Sr | Bolingbrook HS; Trinity Valley | Bolingbrook, IL |
| G | 25 | Ahna Burney | 5 ft 8 in (1.73 m) | Jr | DME Sports Academy | Vancouver, WA |
| F | 30 | Neila Luma | 6 ft 0 in (1.83 m) | RS Sr | Bethlehem Catholic; George Washington | Macungie, PA |
| G | 31 | Shania Meertens | 5 ft 8 in (1.73 m) | RS Sr | Winter Springs; Clemson | Winter Springs, FA |
| F | 32 | Britney Smith | 6 ft 3 in (1.91 m) | Sr | Boone | Orlando, FL |
| F | 33 | Destiny Thomas | 6 ft 2 in (1.88 m) | Jr | Forest Park | Atlanta, GA |
| F | 42 | Ashton Verhulst | 6 ft 2 in (1.88 m) | So | Bishop Miege | Desoto, KS |
| G | | Savannah Henderson | 6 ft 1 in (1.85 m) | Fr | Timber Creek | Orlando, FL |

Head coach

- Katie Abrahamson-Henderson (Iowa)

Assistant coach(es)

- Tahnee Balerio (Missouri State)
- Nykesha Sales (Connecticut)
- Isoken Uzamere (Hofstra)

Legend

- (C) Team captain
- (S) Suspended
- (I) Ineligible
- (W) Walk-on
- Injured
- Current redshirt

Roster
Last update: March 13, 2022

== Schedule and results ==
| Date time, TV | Rank^{#} | Opponent^{#} | Result | Record | Site (attendance) city, state |
Non-conference regular season
| November 9, 2021*; 6:00 pm, ESPN+ | | Duquesne | W 68–39 | 1–0 | Addition Financial Arena (2,558); Orlando, FL |
| November 12, 2021*; 6:00 pm, ESPN+ | | No. 15 Tennessee | L 41–49 | 1–1 | Addition Financial Arena (2,819); Orlando, FL |
| November 17, 2021*; 7:00 pm, ACCNX | | at Virginia | W 59–38 | 2–1 | John Paul Jones Arena (1,432); Charlottesville, VA |
| November 21, 2021*; 2:00 pm, ESPN+ | | Belmont | W 57–45 | 3–1 | Addition Financial Arena (2,385); Orlando, FL |
| November 26, 2021*; 6:30 pm, FloHoops | | vs. Idaho State; Cancún Challenge Riviera Division | W 58–41 | 4–1 | Hard Rock Hotel Riviera Maya (103); Cancún, Mexico |
| November 27, 2021*; 4:00 pm, FloHoops | | vs. USC; Cancún Challenge Riviera Division | W 56–47 | 5–1 | Hard Rock Hotel Riviera Maya (114); Cancún, Mexico |
| December 2, 2021*; 6:00 pm, ESPN+ | | Arkansas | W 52–51 | 6–1 | Addition Financial Arena (2,777); Orlando, FL |
| December 12, 2021*; 2:00 pm, ESPN+ | | at Mercer | W 61–47 | 7–1 | Hawkins Arena (972); Macon, GA |
| December 14, 2021*; 6:00 pm, FloHoops | | at Seton Hall | W 68–56 | 8–1 | Walsh Gymnasium (613); South Orange, NJ |
| December 18, 2021*; 7:30 pm, BTN+ | | at Iowa | L 61–69 | 8–2 | Carver–Hawkeye Arena (6,236); Iowa City, IA |
| December 29, 2021*; 5:00 pm, ESPN+ | | at Princeton | Postponed | | Jadwin Gymnasium; Princeton, NJ |
AAC regular season
| January 5, 2022; 7:00 pm, ESPN+ | | at Tulane | W 64–55 | 9–2 (1–0) | Devlin Fieldhouse (542); New Orleans, LA |
| January 8, 2022; 1:00 pm, ESPN+ | | at East Carolina | W 52–43 | 10–2 (2–0) | Williams Arena at Minges Coliseum (534); Greenville, NC |
| January 11, 2022; 6:00 pm, ESPN+ | | Houston | W 62–59 | 11–2 (3–0) | Addition Financial Arena (2,411); Orlando, FL |
| January 16, 2022; 3:00 pm, ESPNU | | No. 24 South Florida; War on I-4 | W 61–57 | 12–2 (4–0) | Addition Financial Arena (2,763); Orlando, FL |
| January 19, 2022; 8:00 pm, ESPN+ | | at SMU | Canceled | | Moody Coliseum; Dallas, TX |
| January 22, 2022; 2:00 pm, ESPN+ | | at Cincinnati | L 57–61 | 12–3 (4–1) | Fifth Third Arena (626); Cincinnati, OH |
| January 26, 2022; 6:00 pm, ESPN+ | | Tulane | W 69–67 | 13–3 (5–1) | Addition Financial Arena (2,371); Orlando, FL |
| January 29, 2022; 2:00 pm, ESPN+ | | at Wichita State | W 68–50 | 14–3 (6–1) | Charles Koch Arena (1,283); Wichita, KS |
| January 31, 2022; 3:00 pm, ESPN+ | | Temple; Rescheduled from January 2 | W 64–55 | 15–3 (7–1) | Addition Financial Arena (2,177); Orlando, FL |
| February 5, 2022; 4:00 pm, ESPN+ | | Memphis | W 71–57 | 16–3 (8–1) | Addition Financial Arena (2,712); Orlando, FL |
| February 9, 2022; 8:00 pm, ESPN+ | | at Houston | W 54–44 | 17–3 (9–1) | Fertitta Center (344); Houston, TX |
| February 13, 2022; 2:00 pm, ESPN2 | | at South Florida; War on I-4 | W 54–33 | 18–3 (10–1) | Yuengling Center (2,086); Tampa, FL |
| February 16, 2022; 2:00 pm, ESPN+ | | at Wichita State | W 60–35 | 19–3 (11–1) | Addition Financial Arena (2,289); Orlando, FL |
| February 19, 2022; 2:00 pm, ESPN+ | | at Temple | W 68–31 | 20–3 (12–1) | McGonigle Hall (1,173); Philadelphia, PA |
| February 26, 2022; 2:00 pm, ESPN+ | | Cincinnati | W 74–39 | 21–3 (13–1) | Addition Financial Arena (2,806); Orlando, FL |
| March 2, 2022; 4:00 pm, ESPN+ | | Tulsa | W 61–48 | 22–3 (14–1) | Addition Financial Arena (2,435); Orlando, FL |
AAC Women's Tournament
| March 8, 2022; 1:00 pm, ESPN+ | (1) No. 25 | vs. (8) Tulsa; Quarterfinals | W 69–54 | 23–3 | Dickies Arena; Fort Worth, TX |
| March 9, 2022; 3:00 pm, ESPN+ | (1) No. 25 | vs. (6) SMU; Semifinals | W 61–28 | 24–3 | Dickies Arena; Fort Worth, TX |
| March 10, 2022; 9:00 pm, ESPNU | (1) No. 25 | vs. (2) South Florida; Championship | W 53–45 | 25–3 | Dickies Arena; Fort Worth, TX |
NCAA Women's Tournament
| March 19, 2022*; 3:30 pm, ESPNews | (7 B) No. 24 | vs. (10 B) Florida; First Round | W 69–52 | 26–3 | Harry A. Gampel Pavilion (5,073); Storrs, CT |
| March 21, 2022*; 9:00 pm, ESPN | (7 B) No. 24 | at (2 B) No. 5 UConn; Second Round | L 47–52 | 26–4 | Harry A. Gampel Pavilion (10,167); Storrs, CT |
*Non-conference game. ^{#}Rankings from AP Poll. (#) Tournament seedings in parentheses. B=Bridgeport. All times are in Eastern Time.

== Rankings ==
2021–22 NCAA Division I women's basketball rankings

Regular season polls
| Poll | Pre- Season | Week 2 | Week 3 | Week 4 | Week 5 | Week 6 | Week 7 | Week 8 | Week 9 | Week 10 | Week 11 | Week 12 | Week 13 | Week 14 | Week 15 | Week 16 | Week 17 | Week 18 | Final |
|---|---|---|---|---|---|---|---|---|---|---|---|---|---|---|---|---|---|---|---|
| AP | | | | | | | | | | | RV | | | | RV | RV | RV | 25 | 24 |
| Coaches | RV | - | RV | RV | RV | RV | RV | RV | RV | RV | RV | RV | RV | RV | RV | 25 | 23 | 24 | 24 |

Legend
| | Increase in ranking |
| | Decrease in ranking |
| | Not ranked previous week |
| (RV) | Received votes |

== See also ==
- 2021–22 UCF Knights men's basketball team
