= Brett Benzio =

American basketball player

Personal information
- Born: April 27, 1990 (age 35); Winfield, Illinois, U.S.
- Listed height: 6 ft 3 in (1.91 m)

Career information
- High school: Jensen Beach (Palm City, Florida)
- College: Tulane (2008–2012)
- WNBA draft: 2012: undrafted
- Position: Center
- Number: 44

Career highlights
- Conference USA All-Freshman team (2009)

Brett Benzio (born April 27, 1990) is an American basketball center who played college basketball for the Tulane Green Wave. She grew up in Carol Stream, Illinois and went to high school in Florida. She is the 3rd child of Edward and Barbara Benzio of Palm City, and sibling to Brooke Benzio (31), Brian Benzio (27), and Brittney Benzio (23) (who was a member of the Georgia Southern University Lady Eagles basketball team). Her father Edward was also a collegiate athlete, who wrestled for Indiana. Her oldest sister Brooke is an attorney located in South Florida, and her brother is a recent graduate of the University of Florida.

== Playing career ==
=== High school ===
Benzio is from Palm City, Florida, located on the Treasure Coast, just north of West Palm Beach, and averaged 12 points per game and almost two blocks per contest in her first 90 games of high school. She helped Jensen Beach win the 4A State championship in 2007 as she was named Second Team All-State by the Florida Sports Writers Association. As a junior, she was a First Team All-Conference selection. Other accolades included All-Area honors as both a junior and sophomore, and was All-Area Honorable Mention as a freshman. As a senior, she averaged 15 points and 12 rebounds per game; recorded 94 blocked shots (3.5 per game), 65 steals (2.4) and 56 assists (2.1).

In high school, she was a two-sport athlete. She also was First Team All-State in volleyball (in which she also won a state championship), and a multiple time all-area selection. Off the court, she was an AP Scholar Award winner and was named her high school team's scholar athlete of the Year in both 2005 and 2006

=== Tulane Green Wave ===
On November 14, 2007, Benzio, a 6-3 forward from Jensen Beach High School in Florida signed a National Letter of Intent to play with the Green Wave. Benzio averaged 9.3 rebounds per game in her freshman year. Among all freshmen in the NCAA, her average was tied for second with Ashley Palmer of Long Island, only 0.2 rebounds back of UNLV's Jamie Smith. The 296 rebounds she gained during the season were the fourth most in a single-season in Tulane history, and the most ever among freshmen. She averaged 8.9 points per game, and was the only freshman in the nation averaging a double-double before a mid-January bout with mono limited her productivity. In addition, she ranked seventh in C-USA with 1.47 blocks per game. She turned in nine double-doubles with 13 double-digit scoring games and 15 double-figure rebounding games. On January 9, Brett Benzio had seven blocked seven shots against Houston.

=== Tulane statistics ===
Legend
GP	Games played	GS	Games started	MPG	Minutes per game
FG%	Field goal percentage	3P%	3-point field goal percentage	FT%	Free throw percentage
RPG	Rebounds per game	APG	Assists per game	SPG	Steals per game
BPG	Blocks per game	PPG	Points per game	**Bold**	Career high

Year	Team	GP	Points	FG%	FT%	RPG	APG	SPG	BPG	PPG
2008-09	Tulane	32	275	46.8%	63.4%	**9.3**	**1.4**	**1.0**	1.5	8.6
2009-10	Tulane	28	210	51.9%	**66.7%**	7.1	1.1	0.5	1.2	7.5
2010-11	Tulane	32	233	51.9%	64.3%	7.4	0.9	0.7	**2.3**	7.3
2011-12	Tulane	**34**	**319**	**52.4%**	51.4%	9.1	1.2	0.8	2.1	**9.4**
Career		126	1037	50.6%	60.4%	8.3	1.2	0.7	1.8	8.2

== Awards and honors ==
- Conference USA All-Freshmen Team (2008–09)
- Tulane Double Tree Classic All-Tournament Team (2008)
- Tulane Double Tree Classic Most Valuable Player (2008)
- Honorable Mention list by the Louisiana Sports Writer's Association (2009)
