= 2008–09 Tulane Green Wave women's basketball team =

Intercollegiate basketball season

2008–09 Tulane Green Wave women's basketball

Conference USA Tournament, Second Round
- Conference: Conference USA
- Record: 18–14 ( C-USA)
- Head coach: Lisa Stockton
- Assistant coaches: Shanna Cook; Alan Frey; Michele Savage
- Home arena: Fogelman Arena

The 2008–09 Tulane Green Wave women's basketball team represented Tulane University in the 2008–09 NCAA Division I women's basketball season. The Green Wave were coached by Lisa Stockton. The Green Wave were a member of Conference USA.

== Exhibition ==
Date	Location	Opponent	Green Wave Points	Opp. Points	Record
Nov. 8/08	Fogelman Arena	Houston Jaguars	59	34	1-0

== Preseason WNIT ==
Date	Location	Opponent	Green Wave Points	Opp. Points	Record
Nov. 14/08	Fogleman Arena	Illinois State	75	62	1-0
Nov. 16/08	Tempe, AZ	Arizona State	53	86	1-1
Nov. 21/08	Richmond, VA	VCU	49	65	1-2

== Regular season ==
=== Roster ===
Number	Name	Height	Position	Class
23	Tiffany Aidoo	5-9	Guard	Junior
11	Roshaunda Barnes	5-5	Guard	Junior
44	Brett Benzio	6-3	Center	Sophomore
32	Chassity Brown	5-7	Guard	Senior
21	Olivia Grayson	5-8	Guard	Freshman
33	Indira Kaljo	5-10	Guard	Senior
35	Brittany Lindsey	6-1	Forward	Redshirt Junior
31	Brittany Chantel McDonald	6-1	Forward	Freshman
20	Danielle Nunn	5-9	Guard	Junior
42	Jennifer Nwokedi	6-1	Forward	Sophomore
25	Tyria Snow	5-8	Guard	Freshman

=== Schedule ===
- The Green Wave hosted the UNO-Tulane Big Easy Classic on December 6, 2008. In addition, the Green Wave also hosted the Tulane Double Tree Classic from December 20 to December 21.
- On January 9, Brett Benzio had seven blocked seven shots against Houston.

Date	Location	Opponent	Green Wave Points	Opp. Points	Record
Nov. 24/08	Baton Rouge, LA	Louisiana State	47	63	0-1
Nov. 26/08	Fogelman Arena	Louisiana-Lafayette	80	65	1-1
Nov. 28/08	Monroe, LA	Louisiana-Monroe	62	60	2-1
Dec. 5/08	Lake Front Arena	Jackson State	74	48	3-1
Dec. 6/08	Fogelman Arena	Indiana State	66	55	4-1
Dec. 17/08	Thibodaux, LA	Nicholls State	108	66	5-1
Dec. 20/08	Fogelman Arena	Alabama State	80	48	6-1
Dec. 21/08	Fogelman Arena	Providence	68	46	7-1
Dec. 28/08	Fogelman Arena	Temple	71	75	7-2
Dec. 30/08	Fogelman Arena	South Florida	66	80	7-3
Jan. 2/09	El Paso, TX	UTEP	57	48	8-3
Jan. 4/09	Atlanta, GA	Georgia Tech	52	69	8-4
Jan. 9/09	Fogelman Arena	Houston	56	58	8-5
Jan. /09					
Jan. /09					

== Player stats ==
- GP: Games played
- MPG: Minutes per game
- FG%: Field goal percentage
- 3FG%: 3-point field goal percentage
- FT%: Free throw percentage
- RPG: Rebounds per game
- APG: Assists per game
- PPG: Points per game

Player	GP	MPG	FG %	3FG%	FT%	RPG	APG	Steals	Blocks	PPG
Brittany Lindsey	32	25.2	.483	.000	.544	4.6	0.9	28	33	11.8
Indira Kaljo	32	21.5	.415	.420	.659	2.4	0.8	29	1	9.4
Megan Valicevic	32	27.5	.412	.316	.766	4.5	1.5	36	2	9.2
Chassity Brown	32	24.2	.366	.277	.552	3.1	1.9	59	11	8.6
Brett Benzio	32	29.6	.468	.000	.634	9.3	1.4	32	47	8.6
Ashley Langford	32	31.4	.341	.348	.811	3.3	5.8	59	3	6.7
Tiffany Aidoo	32	15.8	.306	.179	.557	2.0	0.9	30	1	4.3
Roshaunda Barnes	32	14.7	.315	.125	.565	2.1	1.9	36	6	3.8
Tia Jackson	19	6.2	.474	.000	.533	0.5	0.5	5	1	1.4
Kiara Slaton	19	7.6	524	.000	.400	1.7	0.2	3	1	1.3
Jennifer Nwokedi	17	5.2	.350	.000	.000	1.0	0.0	2	5	0.8

- March 4: Indira Kaljo was named the Conference USA Newcomer of the Year. She was a transfer from Ventura College in California. Statistically, she has posted three-point shooting numbers on pace to set Tulane records in career three-point percentage. During the season, Kaljo ranked 14th in the NCAA in three-point percentage at .428 (62-of-145) and third in C-USA (which has lower per game requirements for rankings). Kaljo's 62 three-pointers are tied for fourth most in Tulane single-season history with Nikki Luckhurst (2007–08). Her 2.07 made three-pointers per game are third in C-USA.
- Ashley Langford finished her Tulane career by setting new single-season assist records. She has had 10 games with 10 or more assists, and holds 10 of the top 13 single-game assists records. Her 722 assists have led to 1,685 Tulane points (280 layups, 202 jumpers, 228 three-pointers). During this season, she reached the 1,000-point plateau. Between points and assists combined, Langford has led to 2,732 of Tulane's 8,021 points (34.0 percent).
- Brett Benzio averaged 9.3 rebounds per game in her freshman year. Among all freshmen in the NCAA, her average was tied for second with Ashley Palmer of Long Island, only 0.2 rebounds back of UNLV's Jamie Smith. The 296 rebounds she gained during the season were the fourth most in a single-season in Tulane history, and the most ever among freshmen. She averaged 8.9 points per game, and was the only freshman in the nation averaging a double-double before a mid-January bout with mono limited her productivity. In addition, she ranked seventh in C-USA with 1.47 blocks per game. She turned in nine double-doubles with 13 double-digit scoring games and 15 double-figure rebounding games.

== Postseason ==
=== Conference USA Tournament ===
- March 3:The Conference USA Women's Basketball Championship will be hosted by Tulane's Fogelman Arena for the first time since 1999. The tournament will be played from March 5–8.
- March 5:The sixth seeded Green Wave played its first game of the Conference USA Tournament and beat Tulsa 49–44. Brett Benzio recorded a double-double with 10 points and 10 rebounds, while Indira Kaljo scored 12 points. The victory was Lisa Stockton's 300th win at Tulane.

The Green Wave forced 22 Tulsa turnovers. In the second half, the Green Wave scored the first fifteen points.

- March 6: The Green Wave fell in the C-USA tournament at Fogelman Arena for the first time. Southern Mississippi picked up their first win over Tulane in New Orleans since 1997 with a 72–55 win in the quarterfinals of the C-USA tournament.

Brittany Lindsey led Tulane with 16 points and tied her career-high in rebounds with 11. Junior guard Indira Kaljo added 12 points. Senior Ashley Langford handed out seven assists to finish with 722 for her career. Langford finishes her Tulane career 19th in scoring with 1,047 points.

== Awards and honors ==
- Brett Benzio, Conference USA All-Freshmen Team
- Brett Benzio, Doubletree Classic All-Tournament Team
- Brett Benzio, Doubletree Classic Most Valuable Player
- Brett Benzio, Honorable Mention list by the Louisiana Sports Writer's Association
- Indira Kaljo, Conference USA Newcomer of the Year
- Ashley Langford, recipient of the Conference USA Spirit of Service award
- Ashley Langford, Conference USA Scholar Athlete for Women's Basketball
- Ashley Langford, Doubletree Classic All-Tournament Team
- Ashley Langford, Third Team All-Louisiana

== Team players drafted into the WNBA ==
No one from the Green Wave was selected in the 2009 WNBA draft.

== See also ==
- Tulane Green Wave
