= Tulane Green Wave women's basketball =

2025–26 Tulane Green Wave women's basketball team
- University: Tulane University
- Head coach: Ashley Langford (2nd season)
- Location: New Orleans, Louisiana
- Arena: Avron B. Fogelman Arena in Devlin Fieldhouse (capacity: 3,600)
- Conference: The American
- Nickname: Green Wave
- Colors: Olive green and sky blue

NCAA Division I tournament second round
- 1997, 2000, 2002

NCAA Division I tournament appearances
- 1995, 1996, 1997, 1998, 1999, 2000, 2001, 2002, 2003, 2010, 2015

Conference tournament champions
- 1997, 1999, 2000, 2001, 2010

Uniforms
Home	Away	Alternate

The Tulane Green Wave women's basketball team represents Tulane University in NCAA Division I college baseball. The team competes in the American Athletic Conference. They play home games on campus in Avron B. Fogelman Arena in Devlin Fieldhouse, the 9th-oldest active basketball venue in the nation. The team's last appearance in the NCAA Division I women's basketball tournament was in 2015.

== History ==
Women's basketball at Avron B. Fogelman Arena in Devlin Fieldhouse

Tulane's women's basketball program has found continuous success under Lisa Stockton, who began coaching at Tulane in 1995. That year, Stockton led the team to its first NCAA Tournament appearance and was named Metro Conference Coach of the Year. That first appearance began a string of 9 consecutive NCAA Tournament berths. The team earned regular-season C-USA championships 4 times, the last in the 2009–10 season, when they finished with a 23–6 record (14–2 in C-USA). In addition, the program won the C-USA tournament 5 times: 1996–97, 1998–99, 1999–2000, 2000–01, and 2009–10. Lisa Stockton was twice named C-USA Coach of the Year (2006–07 and 2009–10).

2006–07 seniors Jami Montagnino (ranked 5th in NCAA Division I teams in free-throw percentage) and D'Aundra Henry proved essential to the team's success, both hitting 1,000 points for their careers in that season. That team was upset by Rice 64–52 in the C-USA semifinals in Tulsa, Oklahoma, and did not receive an at-large bid to the 2007 NCAA Tournament. With a final record of 25–6, they became the first team with 25 or more wins and six or fewer losses not to make it into the 64-team bracket, along with a 26–3 Montana team. Following a 62–53 win over UAB in the 2010 C-USA Tournament Final, the team advanced to the NCAA Tournament for the first time since 2003. During the 2011–12 season, senior Brett Benzio became the second female and third Tulane basketball player ever to reach 1,000 points and 1,000 rebounds in a season.

== Team achievements ==
=== Yearly records ===
Record table
Season	Coach	Overall	Conference	Standing	Postseason
Metro Conference (1994–1995)
1994–95	Lisa Stockton	19–10	---	---	NCAA First Round
Conference USA (1995–2014)
1995–96	Lisa Stockton	22–10	9–5	T-2nd (Red)	NCAA First Round
1996–97	Lisa Stockton	27–5	12–2	1st (Red)	NCAA Second Round
1997–98	Lisa Stockton	21–7	12–4	2nd (Nat'l)	NCAA First Round
1998–99	Lisa Stockton	24–6	12–4	1st (Nat'l)	NCAA First Round
1999–00	Lisa Stockton	27–5	12–4	1st (Nat'l)	NCAA Second Round
2000–01	Lisa Stockton	22–10	12–4	1st (Nat'l)	NCAA First Round
2001–02	Lisa Stockton	24–11	8–6	5th	NCAA Second Round
2002–03	Lisa Stockton	19–10	10–4	T-3rd	NCAA First Round
2003–04	Lisa Stockton	10–18	3–11	T-11th	
2004–05	Lisa Stockton	11–16	3–11	T-12th	
2005–06	Lisa Stockton	15–12	8–8	T-6th	
2006–07	Lisa Stockton	26–7	13–3	1st	WNIT Second Round
2007–08	Lisa Stockton	16–14	6–10	T-9th	
2008–09	Lisa Stockton	18–14	9–7	6th	
2009–10	Lisa Stockton	26–7	12–4	1st	NCAA First Round
2010–11	Lisa Stockton	23–11	9–7	T-4th	WNIT Second Round
2011–12	Lisa Stockton	23–11	9–7	T-3rd	WNIT Second Round
2012–13	Lisa Stockton	24–9	11–5	3rd	WNIT Third Round
2013–14	Lisa Stockton	20–10	11–5	4th	WNIT First Round
American Athletic Conference (2014–present)
2014–15	Lisa Stockton	22–11	11–7	5th	NCAA First Round
2015–16	Lisa Stockton	23–12	11–7	5th	WNIT Third Round
2016–17	Lisa Stockton	18–15	7–9	T-5th	WNIT Third Round
2017–18	Lisa Stockton	14–17	5–11	T-8th	
2018–19	Lisa Stockton	15–15	5–11	T-9th	
2019–20	Lisa Stockton	14–17	8–8	5th	
2020–21	Lisa Stockton	18–9	8–8	4th	WNIT Second Round
2021–22	Lisa Stockton	20–9	11–5	3rd	WNIT Second Round
Total:		560–309 (.644)			
National champion Postseason invitational champion Conference regular season champion Conference regular season and conference tournament champion Division regular season champion Division regular season and conference tournament champion Conference tournament champion

=== Postseason tournament appearances ===
Under Lisa Stockton, the Green Wave have appeared in 18 postseason tournaments.

==== NCAA Tournaments ====
Year	Seed	Round	Opponent	Result	Overall
1995	#15	First Round	#2 Texas Tech	L 72–87	0–1 (.000)
1996	#14	First Round	#3 Colorado	L 75–83	0–1 (.000)
1997	#4	First Round	#13 UCSB	W 72–69	1–1 (.500)
1997	#4	Second Round	#5 George Washington	L 67–81	1–1 (.500)
1998	#12	First Round	#5 Kansas	L 68–72	0–1 (.000)
1999	#6	First Round	#11 St. Joseph's	L 72–83	0–1 (.000)
2000	#6	First Round	#11 Vermont	W 65–60	1–1 (.500)
2000	#6	Second Round	#3 Texas Tech	L 59–76	1–1 (.500)
2001	#10	First Round	#7 Florida State	L 70–72	0–1 (.000)
2002	#10	First Round	#7 Colorado State	W 73–69	1–1 (.500)
2002	#10	Second Round	#2 Stanford	L 55–77	1–1 (.500)
2003	#11	First Round	#6 Minnesota	L 48–68	0–1 (.000)
2010	#12	First Round	#5 Georgia	L 59–64	0–1 (.000)
2015	#12	First Round	#5 Mississippi State	L 47–57	0–1 (.000)
11 appearances					3–11 (.214)

==== Women's National Invitation Tournaments ====
Year	Round	Opponent	Result	Overall
2007	First Round	Jackson State	W 76–43	1–1 (.500)
2007	Second Round	Mississippi State	L 73–79	1–1 (.500)
2011	First Round	Southern	W 61–31	1–1 (.500)
2011	Second Round	Oral Roberts	L 86–92	1–1 (.500)
2012	First Round	Mississippi Valley State	W 68–61	1–1 (.500)
2012	Second Round	Texas Tech	L 55–69	1–1 (.500)
2013	First Round	Sam Houston State	W 65–57	2–1 (.667)
2013	Second Round	Arkansas	W 60–48	2–1 (.667)
2013	Third Round	Auburn	L 52–72	2–1 (.667)
2014	First Round	Mississippi State	L 68–77	0–1 (.000)
2016	First Round	Alabama	W 53–52	2–1 (.667)
2016	Second Round	Georgia Tech	W 64–61	2–1 (.667)
2016	Third Round	Florida Gulf Coast	L 61–73	2–1 (.667)
2017	First Round	UT Arlington	W 62–53	2–1 (.667)
2017	Second Round	Grambling	W 66–49	2–1 (.667)
2017	Third Round	Alabama	L 72–64	2–1 (.667)
2021	First Round	Illinois St.	W 75–67	1–1 (.500)
2021	Second Round	Ole Miss	L 72–61	1–1 (.500)
8 appearances				10–8 (.556)

== Green Wave in professional basketball ==
The following Green Wave players have played in the WNBA:

- Janell Burse
- Grace Daley
- Barbara Farris
- Teana Miller
- Gwen Slaughter
