= 2021 American Athletic Conference women's basketball tournament =

- Classification: Division I
- Season: 2020–21
- Teams: 10
- Site: Dickies Arena; Fort Worth, Texas
- Champions: South Florida (1st title)
- Winning coach: Jose Fernandez (1st title)
- MVP: Sydni Harvey (South Florida)
- Television: ESPN+, ESPNU

2020–21 American Athletic Conference women's basketball standings
| | Conf. | | | | Overall |
| Team | W | | L | PCT | W | | L | PCT |
|---|---|---|---|---|---|---|---|---|
| No. 19 South Florida † | 13 | – | 2 | .867 | 19 | – | 4 | .826 |
| UCF | 12 | – | 2 | .857 | 16 | – | 5 | .762 |
| Houston | 12 | – | 5 | .706 | 17 | – | 8 | .680 |
| Tulane | 12 | – | 6 | .667 | 18 | – | 9 | .667 |
| Temple | 11 | – | 7 | .611 | 11 | – | 11 | .500 |
| East Carolina | 6 | – | 10 | .375 | 8 | – | 14 | .364 |
| Cincinnati | 6 | – | 12 | .333 | 8 | – | 16 | .333 |
| Tulsa | 4 | – | 13 | .235 | 5 | – | 14 | .263 |
| Wichita State | 2 | – | 9 | .182 | 6 | – | 12 | .333 |
| Memphis | 2 | – | 12 | .143 | 4 | – | 15 | .211 |
| SMU | 0 | – | 2 | .000 | 0 | – | 6 | .000 |
† 2021 AAC tournament winner SMU suspended their season on December 29, 2020; The American has declared a forfeit win for USF against Memphis for conference-standings purposes only as a result of the scheduled game from Jan. 17 that was not played. The teams' overall records are not affected. As of July 7, 2024; Rankings from AP poll

The 2021 American Athletic Conference women's basketball tournament was the postseason tournament held March 8–11, 2021, in the Dickies Arena in Fort Worth, Texas. South Florida won the tournament, its first, and earned an automatic bid to the NCAA tournament.

== Seeds ==
All of the teams in the American Athletic Conference, except for SMU, will qualify for the tournament. SMU canceled their season after going 0–6, so they did not compete in the conference tournament. Teams are seeded based on conference record, and then a tiebreaker system will be used. Teams seeded 7–10 play in opening round, and teams seeded 1–6 receive a bye to the quarterfinals.

| Seed | School | Conference | Overall |
|---|---|---|---|
| 1 | South Florida ‡# | 13–2 | 16–3 |
| 2 | UCF # | 12–2 | 14–3 |
| 3 | Houston # | 12–5 | 15–6 |
| 4 | Tulane # | 12–6 | 16–7 |
| 5 | Temple # | 11–7 | 11–10 |
| 6 | East Carolina # | 6–10 | 8–13 |
| 7 | Cincinnati | 6–12 | 7–15 |
| 8 | Tulsa | 4–13 | 5–13 |
| 9 | Wichita State | 2–9 | 5–11 |
| 10 | Memphis | 2–12 | 4–15 |
‡ – American Athletic Conference regular season champions. # – Received a first-round bye in the conference tournament. Overall records are as of the end of the regular season.

== Schedule ==
| Session | Game | Time* | Matchup^{#} | Score | Television | Attendance |
First round – Monday, March 8
| 1 | 1 | 2:30 PM | No. 9 Wichita State vs. No. 8 Tulsa | 76–64 | ESPN+ | |
| 1 | 2 | 5:30 PM | No. 10 Memphis vs. No. 7 Cincinnati | 67–78 | ESPN+ | |
Quarterfinals – Tuesday, March 9
| 2 | 3 | Noon | No. 5 Temple vs. No. 4 Tulane | 73–83 | ESPN+ | |
| 2 | 4 | 3:00 PM | No. 9 Wichita State vs. No. 1 USF | 44–48 | ESPN+ | |
| 3 | 5 | 7:00 PM | No. 7 Cincinnati vs. No. 2 UCF | 43–53 | ESPN+ | |
| 3 | 6 | 10:00 PM | No. 6 East Carolina vs. No. 3 Houston | 63–73 | ESPN+ | |
Semifinals – Wednesday, March 10
| 4 | 7 | 5:30 PM | No. 4 Tulane vs. No. 1 USF | 47–51 | ESPN+ | |
| 4 | 8 | 8:30 PM | No. 3 Houston vs. No. 2 UCF | 39–61 | ESPN+ | |
Championship – Thursday, March 11
| 5 | 9 | 10:00 PM | No. 1 USF vs. No. 2 UCF | 64–54 | ESPNU | |
*Game times in ET. #-Rankings denote tournament seeding.

== Bracket ==
First round Monday, March 8
8 | Tulsa | 64
9 | Wichita State | 76
7 | Cincinnati | 78
10 | Memphis | 67

Quarterfinals; Tuesday, March 9
4 | Tulane | 83
5 | Temple | 73
1 | USF | 48
9 | Wichita State | 44
2 | UCF | 53
7 | Cincinnati | 43
3 | Houston | 73
6 | East Carolina | 63

Semifinals; Wednesday, March 10
1 | USF | 51
4 | Tulane | 47
2 | UCF | 61
3 | Houston | 39

Championship game Thursday, March 11
1 | USF | 64
2 | UCF | 54

Note: * denotes overtime

== See also ==
- 2021 American Athletic Conference men's basketball tournament
