= 2020–21 South Florida Bulls women's basketball team =

American college basketball season

2020–21 South Florida Bulls women's basketball

AAC regular season champions AAC tournament champions

NCAA tournament, second round
- Conference: American Athletic Conference

Ranking
- Coaches: No. 18
- AP: No. 19
- Record: 19–4 (13–2 AAC)
- Head coach: Jose Fernandez (21st season)
- Associate head coach: Michele Woods-Baxter
- Assistant coaches: Danny Hughes; Yolisha Jackson
- Home arena: Yuengling Center

2020–21 American Athletic Conference women's basketball standings
	Conf.				Overall
Team	W		L	PCT	W		L	PCT
No. 19 South Florida †	13	–	2	.867	19	–	4	.826
UCF	12	–	2	.857	16	–	5	.762
Houston	12	–	5	.706	17	–	8	.680
Tulane	12	–	6	.667	18	–	9	.667
Temple	11	–	7	.611	11	–	11	.500
East Carolina	6	–	10	.375	8	–	14	.364
Cincinnati	6	–	12	.333	8	–	16	.333
Tulsa	4	–	13	.235	5	–	14	.263
Wichita State	2	–	9	.182	6	–	12	.333
Memphis	2	–	12	.143	4	–	15	.211
SMU	0	–	2	.000	0	–	6	.000
† 2021 AAC tournament winner SMU suspended their season on December 29, 2020; The American has declared a forfeit win for USF against Memphis for conference-standings purposes only as a result of the scheduled game from Jan. 17 that was not played. The teams' overall records are not affected. As of July 7, 2024; Rankings from AP poll

The 2020–21 South Florida Bulls women's basketball team represented the University of South Florida during the 2020–21 NCAA Division I women's basketball season. The season marked the 48th women's basketball season for USF, the eighth as a member of the American Athletic Conference, and the 21st under head coach Jose Fernandez. The Bulls played their home games at Yuengling Center on the university's Tampa, Florida campus. The 2020–21 team was the first in USF women's basketball history to win a regular season conference championship, doing so on March 2, 2021 with a win against rival Central Florida. Nine days later they beat Central Florida again to win their first ever conference tournament. Despite their 18–3 record being one of the best in the nation and being ranked 19th in the AP Poll at the time of selection, the Bulls were selected as the eighth seed in the Mercado Region of the 2021 NCAA tournament. Their season ended on March 23, 2021 with the Bulls losing to No. 1 seed NC State in the Round of 32.

== Previous season ==
The Bulls finished the 2019–20 season 18–12, 10–6 in AAC play to finish in fourth place. They entered as the No. 4 seed in the AAC tournament, where they were eliminated by eventual champion UConn in the semifinal. Due to the COVID-19 pandemic, the NCAA tournament was canceled.

== Roster ==
2020–21 South Florida Bulls women's basketball team
Players
Coaches

Pos.	#	Name	Height	Year	Previous school	Hometown
C	0	Tereza Vitulova	6 ft 2 in (1.88 m)	RS Jr	Sportovni Gymnazium	Domašov, Czech Republic
G	1	Maria Alvarez	5 ft 7 in (1.7 m)	So	Miami Country Day School	Bal Harbour, Florida
G	2	Mihaela Lazić	5 ft 6 in (1.68 m)	RS Fr	Klasična Gimnazija	Slavonski Brod, Croatia
PG	3	Sydni Harvey	5 ft 10 in (1.78 m)	Jr	Brentwood Academy	Nashville, Tennessee
PG	4	Elisa Pinzan	5 ft 8 in (1.73 m)	Jr	Istituto Tecnico Algarotti Venezia	Murano, Italy
G	5	Elena Tsineke	5 ft 7 in (1.7 m)	So	Hellenic College of Thessaloniki	Thessaloniki, Greece
F	11	Jade Blagrove	6 ft 2 in (1.88 m)	Fr	Calandlyceum	Barendrecht, Netherlands
F	12	Cristina Bermejo	6 ft 1 in (1.85 m)	So	INS Sant Just Desvern	Sant Just Desvern, Spain
F	13	Sara Guerreiro	5 ft 8 in (1.73 m)	Fr		Seixal, Portugal
F	20	Bethy Mununga	6 ft 0 in (1.83 m)	Sr	Institut Sainte-Marie Jambes	Zellik, Belgium
C	21	Shae Leverett	6 ft 2 in (1.88 m)	Sr	South Effingham High School	Rincon, Georgia
F	22	Kristýna Brabencová	6 ft 0 in (1.83 m)	So	KŠPA Kladno	Brno, Czech Republic
F/C	24	Angelee Rodriguez	6 ft 2 in (1.88 m)	Fr	St. Thomas Aquinas High School	Las Piedras, Puerto Rico
C	31	Beatriz Jordão	6 ft 3 in (1.91 m)	Jr	Quinta dos Lombos	Pombal, Portugal
F	34	Silvia Serrat	6 ft 1 in (1.85 m)	Sr	Joaquim Blume High School	Banyoles, Spain

Head coach

- Jose Fernandez (Florida International University)

Assistant coach(es)

- Michele Woods-Baxter (St. John Fisher College)
- Danny Hughes (Texas Christian University)
- Yolisha Jackson (Jacksonville University)

Legend

- (C) Team captain
- (S) Suspended
- (I) Ineligible
- (W) Walk-on
- Injured
- Current redshirt

Roster
Last update: January 15, 2021

== Preseason ==
=== AAC preseason media poll ===
On October 28, The American released the preseason Poll and other preseason awards. USF was selected as the preseason #1 team in the conference for the first time in program history.

Coaches Poll
Predicted finish	Team	Votes (1st place)
1	South Florida	98 (8)
2	UCF	79 (1)
3	Tulane	78
4	Cincinnati	73 (2)
5	Temple	57
6	Wichita State	54
7	Houston	49
8	Memphis	40
9	East Carolina	36
10	SMU	31
11	Tulsa	10

=== Preseason awards ===
- All-AAC Second Team - Elisa Pinzan
- All-AAC Second Team - Elena Tsineke

== Schedule and results ==
=== COVID-19 impact ===
Due to the ongoing COVID-19 pandemic, the Bulls' schedule was subject to change, including the cancellation or postponement of individual games, the cancellation of the entire season, or games played either with minimal fans or without fans in attendance, and just essential personnel.

- The December 19 home game against Houston was postponed to January 9 due to COVID issues with the Cougars.
- Both games scheduled against SMU were canceled after the Mustangs canceled their season on December 29.
- The January 17 home game against Memphis was canceled due to COVID issues with the Tigers. Memphis refused to travel to Tampa, citing non-COVID related health reasons with the team, but played a game three days later without complaints, so The American declared a forfeit win to USF for conference standings purposes.
- The January 20 game at Wichita State was postponed due to COVID issues with the Shockers. The game was never rescheduled.
- The January 23 game at East Carolina was postponed due to COVID issues with the Bulls. The game was never rescheduled.
- The January 27 home game against Temple was postponed due to COVID issues with the Bulls. The game was never rescheduled.
- The January 30 home game against Cincinnati was postponed until February 17 due to COVID issues with the Bulls.
- The February 7 game at UCF was postponed until March 4 due to COVID issues with both programs.

=== Schedule ===
Date time, TV	Rank^{#}	Opponent^{#}	Result	Record	Site city, state
Regular season
November 28, 2020*; 4:00 p.m., ESPN+	No. (RV)	Jacksonville	W 84–46	1–0	Yuengling Center; Tampa, FL
December 1, 2020*; 7:00 p.m., ESPN+	No. (RV)	No. 4 Baylor	L 62–67	1–1	Yuengling Center; Tampa, FL
December 5, 2020*; 7:00 p.m., ESPN+	No. (RV)	No. 6 Mississippi State	W 67–63^{OT}	2–1	Yuengling Center; Tampa, FL
December 13, 2020*; 2:00 p.m., ESPN+	No. (RV)	Stetson	W 84–46	3–1	Yuengling Center; Tampa, FL
December 16, 2020; 3:00 p.m., ESPN+	No. 23	at Memphis	W 65–58	4–1 (1–0)	Elma Roane Fieldhouse; Memphis, TN
December 19, 2020; 7:00 p.m., ESPN+	No. 23	Houston	Postponed (rescheduled for Jan. 9)		Yuengling Center; Tampa, FL
December 22, 2020; 2:00 p.m., ESPN+	No. 21	at Cincinnati	W 73–61	5–1 (2–0)	Fifth Third Arena; Cincinnati, OH
December 30, 2020; 7:00 p.m., ESPN+	No. 21	at Tulsa	W 63–35	6–1 (3–0)	Reynolds Center; Tulsa, OK
January 2, 2021; 4:00 p.m., ESPN+	No. 21	East Carolina	W 71–58	7–1 (4–0)	Yuengling Center; Tampa FL
January 6, 2021; 7:00 p.m., ESPN+	No. 18	Wichita State	W 66–48	8–1 (5–0)	Yuengling Center; Tampa FL
January 9, 2021; 7:00 p.m., ESPN+	No. 18	Houston	W 80–51	9–1 (6–0)	Yuengling Center; Tampa FL
January 13, 2021; 7:00 p.m., ESPN+	No. 16	at Tulane	W 72–53	10–1 (7–0)	Devlin Fieldhouse; New Orleans, LA
January 17, 2021; 4:00 p.m., ESPNU	No. 16	Memphis	W 2–0 (Forfeit) (Note: Memphis refused to travel to Tampa citing non-COVID related health reasons with the team, but played a game three days later without complaints, so The American declared a forfeit win to USF for conference standings purposes. This forfeit does not effect either team's overall record, only the conference records.)	10–1 (8–0)	Yuengling Center; Tampa FL
January 20, 2021; 7:00 p.m., ESPN+	No. 14	at Wichita State	Postponed (never rescheduled)		Charles Koch Arena; Wichita, KS
January 23, 2021; 1:00 p.m., ESPN+	No. 14	at East Carolina	Postponed (never rescheduled)		Williams Arena at Minges Coliseum; Greenville, NC
January 27, 2021; 4:00 p.m., ESPN+	No. 13	Temple	Postponed (never rescheduled)		Yuengling Center; Tampa FL
January 30, 2021; 3:00 p.m., ESPN+	No. 13	Cincinnati	Postponed (rescheduled for Feb. 17)		Yuengling Center; Tampa FL
February 3, 2021; 7:00 p.m., ESPN+	No. 14	at SMU	Canceled		Moody Coliseum; Dallas, TX
February 7, 2021; 12:00 p.m., ESPN2	No. 14	at UCF; War on I-4	Postponed (rescheduled for Mar. 4)		Addition Financial Arena; Orlando, FL
February 13, 2021; 4:00 p.m., ESPN+	No. 14	Tulsa	W 67–46	11–1 (9–0)	Yuengling Center; Tampa FL
February 17, 2021; 7:00 p.m., ESPN+	No. 12	SMU	Canceled		Yuengling Center; Tampa, FL
February 17, 2021; 7:00 p.m., ESPN+	No. 12	Cincinnati	W 69–65^{OT}	12–1 (10–0)	Yuengling Center; Tampa FL
February 20, 2021; 7:00 p.m., ESPN+	No. 12	Tulane	W 78–69	13–1 (11–0)	Yuengling Center; Tampa FL
February 24, 2021; 3:30 p.m., ESPN+	No. 13	at Temple	W 56–47	14–1 (12–0)	Liacouras Center; Philadelphia, PA
February 27, 2021; 3:00 p.m., ESPN+	No. 13	at Houston	L 49–67	14–2 (12–1)	Fertitta Center; Houston, TX
March 2, 2021; 5:30 p.m., ESPN+	No. 15	UCF; War on I-4	W 65–62	15–2 (13–1)	Yuengling Center; Tampa, FL
March 4, 2021; 5:00 p.m., ESPN+	No. 15	at UCF; War on I-4	L 45–58	15–3 (13–2)	Addition Financial Arena; Orlando, FL
AAC Tournament
March 9, 2021; 3:00 p.m., ESPN+	(1) No. 20	vs. (9) Wichita State; AAC Tournament Quarterfinal	W 48–44	16–3	Dickies Arena; Fort Worth, TX
March 10, 2021; 5:30 p.m., ESPN+	(1) No. 20	vs. (4) Tulane; AAC Tournament Semifinal	W 51–47	17–3	Dickies Arena; Fort Worth, TX
March 11, 2021; 10:00 p.m., ESPNU	(1) No. 20	vs. (2) UCF; AAC Championship Game/War on I-4	W 64–54	18–3	Dickies Arena; Fort Worth, TX
NCAA tournament
March 21, 2021; 9:30 p.m., ESPN2	(8) No. 19	vs. (9) Washington State; NCAA Tournament First Round	W 57–53	19–3	Frank Erwin Center; Austin, TX
March 23, 2021; 3:00 p.m., ESPN2	(8) No. 19	vs. (1) No. 3 NC State; NCAA Tournament Second Round	L 67–79	19–4	Alamodome; San Antonio, TX
*Non-conference game. ^{#}Rankings from AP Poll. (#) Tournament seedings in parentheses. All times are in Eastern Time.

== Rankings ==
Regular season polls
Poll	Pre- season	Week 2	Week 3	Week 4	Week 5	Week 6	Week 7	Week 8	Week 9	Week 10	Week 11	Week 12	Week 13	Week 14	Week 15	Week 16	Week 17	Final
AP	(RV)	(RV)	(RV)	23	21	21	18	16	14	13	14	14	12	13	15	20	19	19
Coaches	(RV)	(RV)	(RV)	24	22	22	19	17	14	16	16	15	15	13	14	18	18	18

Legend
	Increase in ranking
	Decrease in ranking
	Not ranked previous week
(RV)	Received votes

== Player honors ==
=== AAC Player of the Week ===
- Elisa Pinzan - Week 2
- Bethy Mununga - Week 6
- Elisa Pinzan - Week 8

=== AAC Most Improved Player of the Year ===
- Elisa Pinzan

=== AAC Sixth Player of the Year ===
- Maria Alvarez

=== First Team All-AAC ===
- Bethy Mununga
- Elena Tsineke

=== Second Team All-AAC ===
- Elisa Pinzan

=== Third Team All-AAC ===
- Sydni Harvey

=== AAC All-Tournament Team ===
- Sydni Harvey
- Elena Tsineke
- Bethy Mununga

=== AAC Tournament Most Outstanding Player ===
- Sydni Harvey

== Other honors ==
=== AAC Coach of the Year ===
- Jose Fernandez

== See also ==
- 2020–21 South Florida Bulls men's basketball team
