= 2007 Women's National Invitation Tournament =

College basketball postseason tournament

- Teams: 48
- Finals site: Arena-Auditorium, Laramie, Wyoming
- Champions: Wyoming (1st title)
- Runner-up: Wisconsin (3rd title game)
- Winning coach: Joe Legerski (1st title)
- Attendance: 15,462 (championship game)

The 2007 Women's National Invitation Tournament (WNIT) was a single-elimination tournament of 48 National Collegiate Athletic Association (NCAA) Division I teams that did not participate in the 2007 NCAA Division I women's basketball tournament.

The teams were deemed the "best of the rest" from the 31 Division I conferences were joined by 17 at-large selections.

The final four of the tournament paired Wisconsin against Western Kentucky and Wyoming against 2006 WNIT champion Kansas State. Wisconsin (23–12) defeated Western Kentucky 79–72. Meanwhile, across the country, Wyoming and Kansas State played a triple-overtime thriller. The Cowgirls eventually pulled out the victory, holding Kansas State to a single point in the third overtime, and winning 89–79.

The championship game of the WNIT was played Saturday, March 31, 2007, in front of 15,462 fans at the Arena-Auditorium in Laramie, Wyoming (the largest crowd in Wyoming Cowgirl History). Wyoming dominated the game and won 72–56, bringing the Cowgirls their first postseason championship win. They also became the first Mountain West Conference team to win the tournament.

== Region 1 ==
Round 1 March 14–16
Wyoming	84
Nevada	56
San Diego	63
UC Santa Barbara	75
Iona	91
Long Island	79
Illinois State	71***
Rice	61

Round 2 March 16–19
Missouri	67
Wyoming	73
Oregon	70
UC Santa Barbara	54
Indiana	74
Iona	71
South Dakota State	61
Illinois State	48

Round 3 March 20–22
Wyoming	64
Oregon	62
Indiana	53
South Dakota State	60

Quarterfinals; March 22–25
Wyoming	70
South Dakota State	59

(***) denotes triple overtime

== Region 2 ==
Round 1 March 14–16
W. Carolina	91
E. Tennessee St.	63
UAB	81
Davidson	77
Utah	78
Montana	70
Stephen F. Austin	50
Southern Illinois	58

Round 2 March 16–19
Virginia Tech	74
Western Carolina	64
Auburn	74
UAB	60
Illinois	59
Utah	48
Kansas State	72
Southern Illinois	46

Round 3 March 20–22
Virginia Tech	73
Auburn	81
Illinois	51
Kansas State	66

Quarterfinals; March 22–25
Auburn	54
Kansas State	67

== Region 3 ==
Round 1 March 14–16
Tulane	76
Jackson State	43
Minnesota	97
Illinois-Chicago	54
Hartford	70
Bucknell	54
Seton Hall	60
Dartmouth	39

Round 2 March 16–19
Mississippi State	79
Tulane	73
W. Kentucky	73
Minnesota	57
South Carolina	81
Hartford	40
Hofstra	64
Seton Hall	52

Round 3 March 20–22
Mississippi State	56
W. Kentucky	59
South Carolina	59
Hofstra	64

Quarterfinals; March 22–25
W. Kentucky	72
Hofstra	54

== Region 4 ==
Round 1 March 14–16
Charlotte	72
High Point	45
Saint Joseph's	52
Coppin State	67
Arkansas State	59
Murray State	52
Oakland	56
Kentucky	65

Round 2 March 16–19
Virginia	74
Charlotte	72
S. Florida	66
Coppin State	49
Wisconsin	77
Arkansas State	45
Ball State	82
Kentucky	85

Round 3 March 20–22
Virginia	73
S. Florida	72
Wisconsin	67
Kentucky	61

Quarterfinals; March 22–25
Virginia	78
Wisconsin	84

== Semifinals and final ==
Semifinals; March 26–29
Wyoming	89***
Kansas State	79
W. Kentucky	72
Wisconsin	79

Championship; March 31
Wyoming	72
Wisconsin	56

(***) denotes triple overtime

== See also ==
- 2007 National Invitation Tournament
