= 2019–20 Atlantic Coast Conference women's basketball season =

- League: NCAA Division I
- Sport: Basketball
- Teams: 15
- TV partner(s): ACC Network, ESPN, Regional Sports Networks

WNBA Draft
- Top draft pick: Jocelyn Willoughby, Virginia
- Picked by: Phoenix Mercury, 10th overall

2019–20 NCAA Division I women's basketball season
- Regular Season Champions: Louisville
- Runners-up: NC State
- Season MVP: Dana Evans, Louisville

ACC Tournament
- Champions: NC State
- Finals MVP: Aislinn Konig (NC State)

Atlantic Coast Conference women's basketball seasons
- ← 2018–19 2020–21 →

2019–20 ACC women's basketball standings
	Conf.				Overall
Team	W		L	PCT	W		L	PCT
No. 6 Louisville	16	–	2	.889	28	–	4	.875
No. 8 NC State†	14	–	4	.778	28	–	4	.875
Duke	12	–	6	.667	18	–	12	.600
No. 18 Florida State	11	–	7	.611	24	–	8	.750
Virginia Tech	11	–	7	.611	21	–	9	.700
Boston College	11	–	7	.611	20	–	12	.625
Georgia Tech	10	–	8	.556	20	–	11	.645
Syracuse	9	–	9	.500	16	–	15	.516
Virginia	8	–	10	.444	13	–	17	.433
Notre Dame	8	–	10	.444	13	–	18	.419
Miami (FL)	7	–	11	.389	15	–	15	.500
North Carolina	7	–	11	.389	16	–	14	.533
Wake Forest	7	–	11	.389	16	–	16	.500
Clemson	3	–	15	.167	8	–	23	.258
Pittsburgh	1	–	17	.056	5	–	26	.161
† 2020 ACC tournament winner As of March 5, 2020; Rankings from AP poll

The 2019–20 Atlantic Coast Conference women's basketball season began with practices in October 2018, followed by the start of the 2019–20 NCAA Division I women's basketball season in November. Conference play started in January 2020 and will conclude in March with the 2020 ACC women's basketball tournament at the Greensboro Coliseum in Greensboro, NC.

The postseason was cut short due to the COVID-19 outbreak. On March 12, the NCAA announced the tournament would be cancelled, along with all remaining winter and spring championships. The NCAA tournament and WNIT were both cancelled before they began.

== Head coaches ==
=== Coaching changes ===
- Georgia Tech fired MaChelle Joseph amid controversy after the 18–19 season. In April, Nell Fortner was announced as the new head coach.
- Sylvia Hatchell stepped down after 33 years as North Carolina's head coach after an investigation determined she had made “racially insensitive” comments and pressured injured players to compete. Courtney Banghart was announced as the new head coach on April 30.

=== Coaches ===
Team	Head coach	Previous job	Years at school	Record at school	ACC record	ACC titles	NCAA Tournaments	NCAA Final Fours	NCAA Championships
Boston College	Joanna Bernabei-McNamee	Albany	2	14–16	3–13	0	0	0	0
Clemson	Amanda Butler	Florida	2	20–13	9–7	0	1	0	0
Duke	Joanne P. McCallie	Michigan State	13	312–95	6–10	4	10	0	0
Florida State	Sue Semrau	Wisconsin (Assistant)	23	541–249	196–144	2	15	0	0
Georgia Tech	Nell Fortner	Auburn	1	0–0	0–0	0	0	0	0
Louisville	Jeff Walz	Maryland (Assistant)	13	332–99	145–50	1	5	3	0
Miami	Katie Meier	Charlotte	15	277–172	111–103	1	8	0	0
NC State	Wes Moore	Chattanooga	7	140–57	63–33	0	4	0	0
North Carolina	Courtney Banghart	Princeton	1	0–0	0–0	0	0	0	0
Notre Dame	Muffet McGraw	Lehigh	33	835–233	417–87	5	6	9	2
Pittsburgh	Lance White	Florida State (Assistant)	2	11–20	2–14	0	0	0	0
Syracuse	Quentin Hillsman	Syracuse (Assistant)	13	288–145	66–40	0	6	1	0
Virginia	Tina Thompson	Texas (associate head coach)	2	12–19	5–11	0	0	0	0
Virginia Tech	Kenny Brooks	James Madison	4	65–40	16–32	0	0	0	0
Wake Forest	Jennifer Hoover	High Point	8	98–124	30–84	0	0	0	0

Notes:

- Year at school includes 2019–20 season.
- Overall and ACC records are from time at current school and are through the end the 2018–19 season.
- NCAA Tournament appearances are from time at current school only.
- NCAA Final Fours and Championship include time at other schools

== Preseason ==
=== Preseason watch lists ===
Below is a table of notable preseason watch lists.

Lieberman	Drysdale	Miller	McClain	Leslie
Taja Cole – Virginia Tech	Haley Gorecki – Duke; Aislinn Konig – NC State; Jocelyn Willoughby – Virginia	Francesca Pan – Georgia Tech; Sam Brunelle – Notre Dame	Leaonna Odom – Duke; Kiah Gillespie – Florida State	Jade Williams – Duke; Beatrice Mompremier – Miami; Elissa Cunane – NC State; Janelle Bailey – North Carolina

=== ACC Women's Basketball Tip-off ===
Prior to the start of the season, the ACC hosted a media day at the Westin Hotel in Charlotte, North Carolina. At the media day, the head coaches voted on the finishing order of the teams, an All-ACC team, a Preseason Player of the Year, and Newcomers to watch. The media day was hosted on October 3, 2019. A selected group of student athletes also took questions from the media on this day.

At the media day, both the head coaches and the Blue Ribbon Panel predicted that Louisville would be league champion.

==== ACC preseason polls ====
2019 ACC Women's Basketball Preseason Polls
Head coaches	Blue Ribbon Panel
1. Louisville – (13) 223; 2. NC State – (2) 201; 3. Florida State – 190; 4. Miami – 185; 5. Notre Dame – 159; 6. Syracuse – 150; 7. Duke – 143; 8. Clemson – 105; 9. North Carolina – 92; 10. Virginia Tech – 91; 11. Georgia Tech – 70; 12. Virginia – 67; 13. Boston College – 58; 14. Pittsburgh – 41; 15. Wake Forest – 25	1. Louisville – (34) 713; 2. NC State – (8) 637; 3. Florida State – (3) 623; 4. Notre Dame – (4) 580; 5. Miami – 579; 6. Syracuse – 497; 7. Duke – 432; 8. Clemson – 353; 9. North Carolina – 343; 10. Virginia Tech – 291; 11. Virginia – 229; 12. Georgia Tech – 225; 13. Boston College – 168; 14. Pittsburgh – 122; 15. Wake Forest – 89

==== Preseason All-ACC Teams ====
2019 ACC Women's Basketball Preseason All-ACC Teams
Head coaches	Blue Ribbon Panel
Kobi Thornton – Clemson; Haley Gorecki – Duke; Kicki Ekhomu – Florida State; Kiah Gillespie – Florida State; Elizabeth Balogun – Louisville; Beatrice Mompremier – Miami; Elissa Cunane – NC State; Aislinn Konig – NC State; Janelle Bailey – North Carolina; Jocelyn Willoughby – Virginia	Kobi Thornton – Clemson; Haley Gorecki – Duke; Kicki Ekhomu – Florida State; Kiah Gillespie – Florida State; Elizabeth Balogun – Louisville; Dana Evans – Louisville; Beatrice Mompremier – Miami; Elissa Cunane – NC State; Janelle Bailey – North Carolina; Jocelyn Willoughby – Virginia

==== Preseason ACC Player of the Year ====
2019 ACC Women's Basketball Preseason Player of the Year
Head coaches	Blue Ribbon Panel
Beatrice Mompremier – Miami	Beatrice Mompremier – Miami

==== Newcomer Watchlist ====
2019 ACC Women's Basketball Newcomer Watchlists
Head coaches	Blue Ribbon Panel
River Baldwin – Florida State; Nyah Green – Louisville; Jakia Brown-Turner – NC State; Sam Brunelle – Notre Dame; Anaya Peoples – Notre Dame	River Baldwin – Florida State; Nyah Green – Louisville; Jakia Brown-Turner – NC State; Sam Brunelle – Notre Dame; Anaya Peoples – Notre Dame

== Regular season ==
=== Rankings ===
Legend
Increase in ranking
Decrease in ranking
Not ranked previous week
First Place votes shown in ()

		Pre	Wk 2	Wk 3	Wk 4	Wk 5	Wk 6	Wk 7	Wk 8	Wk 9	Wk 10	Wk 11	Wk 12	Wk 13	Wk 14	Wk 15	Wk 16	Wk 17	Wk 18	Wk 19	Final
Boston College	AP																			RV	RV
Boston College	C																				N/A
Clemson	AP																				
Clemson	C																				N/A
Duke	AP	RV																RV	RV	RV	RV
Duke	C																RV	RV	RV	RV	N/A
Florida State	AP	12	12	12	12 т	8	8	8	8	8	11	13	14	14	17	14	17	19	22	18	19
Florida State	C	13	13	13	10	8	8	8	8	11	13	14	14	18	14	18	22	23	20	20	N/A
Georgia Tech	AP											RV									
Georgia Tech	C						RV	RV	RV		RV										N/A
Louisville	AP	9	9	8	8	2 (5)	7	6	7	7	7	5 (2)	5 (2)	5 (1)	5 (1)	9	5	5	4	6	6
Louisville	C	9	9	9	2 (5)	7	7	7	7	7	4 (1)	3	4 (1)	4	9	6	5	5	6	7	N/A
Miami	AP	18 т	17	16	19	21	25	RV	24	23	RV										
Miami	C	19	17	18	22	RV		RV	RV												N/A
North Carolina	AP	RV				RV	RV														
North Carolina	C																				N/A
NC State	AP	14	14	14	12 т	13	9	9	9	9	9	9	8	7	7	4	10	8	10	8	8
NC State	C	12	12	12	12	9	9	9	9	8	10	8	7	7	4	10	11	10	8	8	N/A
Notre Dame	AP	16	15	RV	RV	RV															
Notre Dame	C	14	RV	RV	RV																N/A
Pittsburgh	AP																				
Pittsburgh	C																				N/A
Syracuse	AP	21	20	17	18	RV					RV										
Syracuse	C	17	15	16	RV					RV											N/A
Virginia	AP																				
Virginia	C																				N/A
Virginia Tech	AP																		RV		
Virginia Tech	C																				N/A
Wake Forest	AP																				
Wake Forest	C																				N/A

Note: The Coaches Poll releases a final poll after the NCAA tournament, but the AP Poll does not release a poll at this time. Due to the cancellation of the NCAA and WNIT tournaments, the Coaches Poll did not release a final poll.

=== Conference matrix ===
This table summarizes the head-to-head results between teams in conference play. Each team played 18 conference games, and at least 1 against each opponent. This marked the first year that teams played an eighteen-game conference schedule.

	Boston College	Clemson	Duke	Florida State	Georgia Tech	Louisville	Miami	North Carolina	NC State	Notre Dame	Pittsburgh	Syracuse	Virginia	Virginia Tech	Wake Forest
vs. Boston College	–	68–70	85–73	56–65	48–55	81–70; 68–48	64–75	75–93	72–54	65–75; 55–56	70–79; 59–70	89–79; 81–88	69–52	70–49	54–67
vs. Clemson	70–68	–	58–62	81–64; 81–54	49–47; 56–44	75–50	68–64; 63–48	86–72	79–60	55–71	67–75 (OT)	59–46	70–51	71–50	63–58; 66–52
vs. Duke	73–85	62–58	–	64–66	46–58	60–55	55–74	61–71; 54–73	63–60; 65–70	47–50	56–73	58–88	66–63; 47–62	67–72 (OT); 70–56	60–58
vs. Florida State	65–56	64–81; 54–81	66–64	–	67–52; 65–62	59–67	62–73; 61–79	64–78	68–51	70–67	41–66	90–89 (OT)	55–63	62–86	65–70; 67–78
vs. Georgia Tech	55–48	47–49; 44–56	58–46	52–67; 62–65	–	58–47	54–61; 54–49 (OT)	67–60 (OT)	61–65	59–51	48–77	64–82	51–61	64–61 (OT)	65–60; 52–62
vs. Louisville	70–81; 48–68	50–75	55–60	67–59	47–58	–	41–87	67–74	59–66	54–86; 49–82	49–83; 47–79	58–62; 59–51	56–71	53–70	61–75
vs. Miami	75–64	64–68; 48–63	74–55	73–62; 79–61	61–54; 49–54 (OT)	87–41	–	78–58	50–48	76–53	54–73	62–77	69–64	69–45	56–59; 63–79
vs. North Carolina	93–75	72–86	71–61; 73–54	78–64	60–67 (OT)	74–67	58–78	–	60–66; 76–68	83–65	62–70	74–56	47–65; 68–78	76–70; 72–63	82–79 (OT)
vs. NC State	54–72	60–79	60–63; 70–65	51–68	65–61	66–59	48–50	66–60; 68–76	–	56–90	44–88	60–69	60–80; 64–75	69–76; 59–71	45–59
vs. Notre Dame	75–65; 56–55	71–55	50–47	67–70	51–59	86–54; 82–49	53–76	65–83	90–56	–	52–60; 52–74	74–63 (OT); 70–72	90–60	68–62	71–75
vs. Pittsburgh	79–70; 70–59	75–67 (OT)	73–56	66–41	77–48	83–49; 79–47	73–54	70–62	88–44	60–52; 74–52	–	69–51; 71–53	66–55	68–56	48–53
vs. Syracuse	79–89; 88–81	46–59	88–58	89–90 (OT)	82–64	62–58; 51–59	77–62	56–74	69–60	63–74 (OT); 72–70	51–69; 53–71	–	57–41	65–67	65–60
vs. Virginia	52–69	54–70	63–66; 62–47	63–55	61–51	71–56	64–69	65–47; 78–68	80–60; 75–64	60–90	55–66	41–57	–	69–61; 76–86	0–0
vs. Virginia Tech	49–70	50–71	72–67 (OT); 56–70	86–62	61–64 (OT)	70–53	45–69	70–76; 63–72	76–69; 71–59	62–68	56–68	67–65	61–69; 86–76	–	62–56; 62–73
vs. Wake Forest	67–54	58–63; 52–66	58–60	70–65; 78–67	60–65; 62–52	75–61	59–56; 79–63	79–82 (OT)	59–45	75–71	53–48	60–65	0–0	56–62; 73–62	–
Total	11–7	3–15	12–6	11–7	10–8	16–2	7–11	7–11	14–4	8–10	1–17	9–9	8–10	11–7	7–11

=== Player of the week ===
Throughout the conference regular season, the Atlantic Coast Conference offices named a Player(s) of the week and a Rookie(s) of the week.

Week	Player of the week	Rookie of the week	Reference
Week 1 – Nov. 11	Jocelyn Willoughby – Virginia	Elizabeth Kitley – Virginia Tech	
Week 2 – Nov. 18	Nausia Woolfolk – Florida State	Malu Tshitenge – North Carolina	
Week 3 – Nov. 25	Haley Gorecki – Duke	Kylie Kornegay-Lucas – Virginia	
Week 3 – Nov. 25	Beatrice Mompremier – Miami	Kylie Kornegay-Lucas – Virginia	
Week 4 – Dec. 2	Dana Evans – Louisville	Anaya Peoples – Notre Dame	
Week 5 – Dec. 9	Kiah Gillespie – Florida State	Amber Brown – Pittsburgh	
Week 6 – Dec. 16	Elissa Cunane – NC State	Sam Brunelle – Notre Dame	
Week 7 – Dec. 23	Kiah Gillespie (2) – Florida State	River Baldwin – Florida State	
Week 7 – Dec. 23	Beatrice Mompremier (2) – Miami	River Baldwin – Florida State	
Week 8 – Dec. 30	Kendall Spray – Clemson	River Baldwin (2) – Florida State	
Week 9 – Jan 6	Elissa Cunane (2) – NC State	Amber Brown (2) – Pittsburgh	
Week 10 – Jan 13	Jocelyn Willoughby (2) – Virginia	Shemera Williams – Virginia	
Week 11 – Jan 20	Dana Evans (2) – Louisville	Amari Robinson – Clemson	
Week 12 – Jan 27	Leaonna Odom – Duke	Shemera Williams (2) – Virginia	
Week 13 – Feb 3	Emma Guy – Boston College	Dayshanette Harris – Pittsburgh	
Week 13 – Feb 3	Janelle Bailey – North Carolina	Dayshanette Harris – Pittsburgh	
Week 14 – Feb 10	Kiah Gillespie (2) – Florida State	Katlyn Gilbert – Notre Dame	
Week 15 – Feb 17	Taylor Soule – Boston College	Elizabeth Kitley (2) – Virginia Tech	
Week 16 – Feb 24	Taylor Soule (2) – Boston College	Elizabeth Kitley (3) – Virginia Tech	
Week 17 – Mar 2	Haley Gorecki (2) – Duke	Sam Brunelle (2) – Notre Dame	

== Postseason ==
=== ACC tournament ===
First round
12	North Carolina	73
13	Wake Forest	83
10	Notre Dame	65
15	Pittsburgh	67
11	Miami	56
14	Clemson	71

Second round
8	Syracuse	67
9	Virginia	50
5	Virginia Tech	55
13	Wake Forest	58
7	Georgia Tech	68
15	Pittsburgh	58
6	Boston College	85
14	Clemson	58

Quarterfinals
1	Louisville	71
8	Syracuse	46
4	Florida State	76
13	Wake Forest	47
2	NC State	57
7	Georgia Tech	48
3	Duke	77
6	Boston College	84

Semifinals
1	Louisville	60
4	Florida State	62
2	NC State	82
6	Boston College	75

Championship
4	Florida State	66
2	NC State	71

== Honors and awards ==
=== ACC Awards ===
2019 ACC Women's Basketball Individual Awards
Award	Recipient(s)
Player of the Year	Dana Evans – Louisville
Coach of the Year	Joanna Bernabei-McNamee – Boston College
Defensive Player of the Year	Kylee Shook – Louisville
Freshman of the Year	Elizabeth Kitley – Virginia Tech
Sixth Player of the Year	Trinity Baptiste – Virginia Tech
Most Improved Player	Taylor Soule – Boston College

2019 ACC Women's Basketball All-Conference Teams (Blue Ribbon Panel)
First Team	Second Team	Honorable Mention	Freshman Team
Haley Gorecki – Duke; Kiah Gillespie – Florida State; Nicki Ekhomu – Florida State; Dana Evans – Louisville; Jazmine Jones – Louisville; Kylee Shook – Louisville; Elissa Cunane – NC State; Janelle Bailey – North Carolina; Kiara Lewis – Syracuse; Jocelyn Willoughby – Virginia	Emma Guy – Boston College; Taylor Soule – Boston College; Leaonna Odom – Duke; Aisha Sheppard – Virginia Tech; Ivana Raca – Wake Forest	Francesca Pan – Georgia Tech; Aislinn Konig – NC State; Taylor Koenen – North Carolina; Destinee Walker – Notre Dame; Taja Cole – Virginia Tech	Amari Robinson – Clemson; Jakia Brown-Turner – NC State; Malu Tshitenge – North Carolina; Sam Brunelle – Notre Dame; Katlyn Gilbert – Notre Dame; Anaya Peoples – Notre Dame; Dayshanette Harris – Pittsburgh; Elizabeth Kitley – Virginia Tech

2019 ACC Women's Basketball All-Conference Teams (head coaches)
First Team	Second Team	Honorable Mention	Freshman Team
Emma Guy – Boston College; Haley Gorecki – Duke; Kiah Gillespie – Florida State; Nicki Ekhomu – Florida State; Dana Evans – Louisville; Jazmine Jones – Louisville; Elissa Cunane – NC State; Kiara Lewis – Syracuse; Jocelyn Willoughby – Virginia; Aisha Sheppard – Virginia Tech	Leaonna Odom – Duke; Francesca Pan – Georgia Tech; Kylee Shook – Louisville; Aislinn Konig – NC State; Ivana Raca – Wake Forest	Taylor Soule – Boston College; Janelle Bailey – North Carolina; Taylor Koenen – North Carolina	Amari Robinson – Clemson; Jada Boyd – NC State; Jakia Brown-Turner – NC State; Malu Tshitenge – North Carolina; Sam Brunelle – Notre Dame; Katlyn Gilbert – Notre Dame; Dayshanette Harris – Pitt; Elizabeth Kitley – Virginia Tech

2019 ACC Women's Basketball All-ACC Defensive Team
Player	Team
Haley Gorecki	Duke
Jazmine Jones	Louisville
Kylee Shook	Louisville
Mykea Gray	Miami
Taja Cole	Virginia Tech

== WNBA draft ==
The ACC lead all conferences with eight players selected in the 2020 WNBA Draft. This is the second year in a row that the ACC has had the most selections of any conference. The ACC has had at least one first round selection in the past fifteen WNBA Drafts. The next longest such streak is six.

Player	Team	Round	Pick #	Position	School
Jocelyn Willoughby	Phoenix Mercury	1	10	G	Virginia
Jazmine Jones	New York Liberty	1	12	G	Louisville
Kylee Shook	New York Liberty	2	13	F	Louisville
Leaonna Odom	New York Liberty	2	15	F	Duke
Beatrice Mompremier	Los Angeles Sparks	2	20	F	Miami
Kobi Thornton	Atlanta Dream	3	27	F	Clemson
Haley Gorecki	Seattle Storm	3	31	G	Duke
Kiah Gillespie	Chicago Sky	3	32	F	Florida State
