= Kianna Smith =

American basketball player (born 1999)

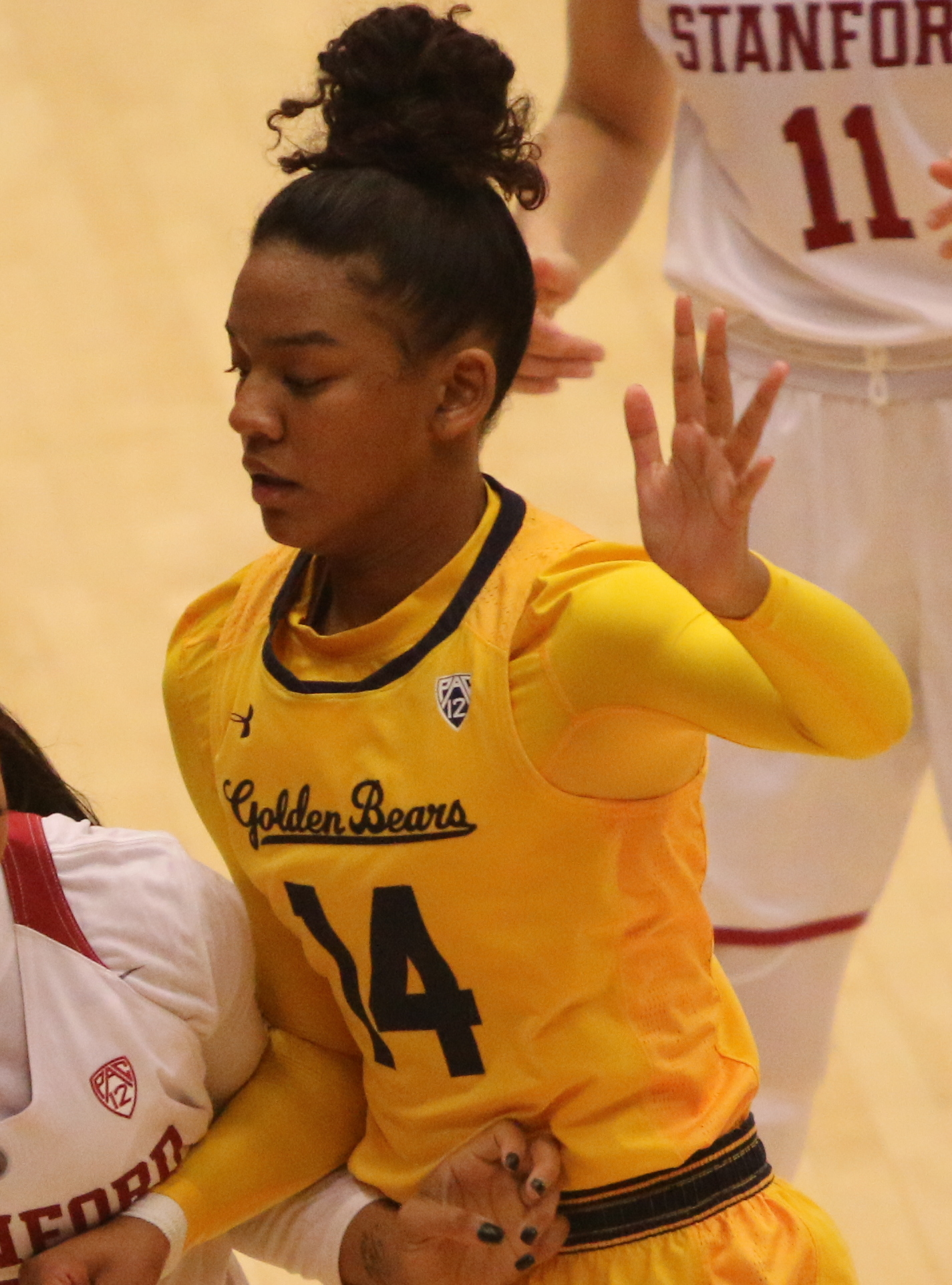
- Smith with California in 2019

No. 14 – Samsung Life Blueminx
- Position: Point guard / shooting guard
- League: WNBA

Personal information
- Born: June 10, 1999 (age 27) Moreno Valley, California, U.S.
- Listed height: 6 ft 0 in (1.83 m)

Career information
- High school: John W. North (Riverside, California); Troy (Fullerton, California)
- College: California (2017–2019); Louisville (2020–2022)
- WNBA draft: 2022: 2nd round, 16th overall pick
- Drafted by: Los Angeles Sparks
- Playing career: 2022–present

Career history
- 2022: Los Angeles Sparks
- 2022–present: Samsung Life Blueminx

Career highlights
- Pac-12 All-Freshman Team (2018); McDonald's All-American (2017)
- Stats at WNBA.com
- Stats at Basketball Reference

Kianna Smith (born June 10, 1999) is an American-South Korean professional basketball player for the Samsung Life Blueminx. She played college basketball for the California Golden Bears and the Louisville Cardinals. Smith graduated from Troy High School in Fullerton, California, where she was rated a five-star recruit by ESPN and earned McDonald's All-American honors.

== Early life ==
Smith was born in Moreno Valley, California on June 10, 1999. She grew up playing against her older brother, Jamal, in their backyard, which she credits to her development as a basketball player. She played basketball for John W. North High School in Riverside, California before transferring to Troy High School in Fullerton, California for her junior season. Her school was located across the street from California State University, Fullerton, where her father served as associate head coach of the men's basketball team and Jamal played for the team. Due to the proximity of Cal State Fullerton, Smith often worked out with the men's team at Titan Gym after school.

She averaged 15 points per game as a junior at Troy, and received Orange County Register All-County First Team honors. As a senior, Smith averaged 21.3 points, 5.5 rebounds, about four assists and three steals per game, helping her team reach the California Interscholastic Federation (CIF) Open Division semifinals. She was named Orange County Register Player of the Year and won the John R. Wooden Award as the top player in the CIF Southern Section Division I. Smith was selected to play in the McDonald's All-American Game. She competed for West Coast Premier on the Amateur Athletic Union circuit alongside Kennedy Burke and Destiny Littleton.

=== Recruiting ===
Smith was considered a five-star recruit and the fifth-best guard in the 2017 class by ESPN. She committed to play college basketball for California under head coach Lindsay Gottlieb, becoming the program's first commit of her class. In November 2016, Smith signed her National Letter of Intent with California.

== College career ==
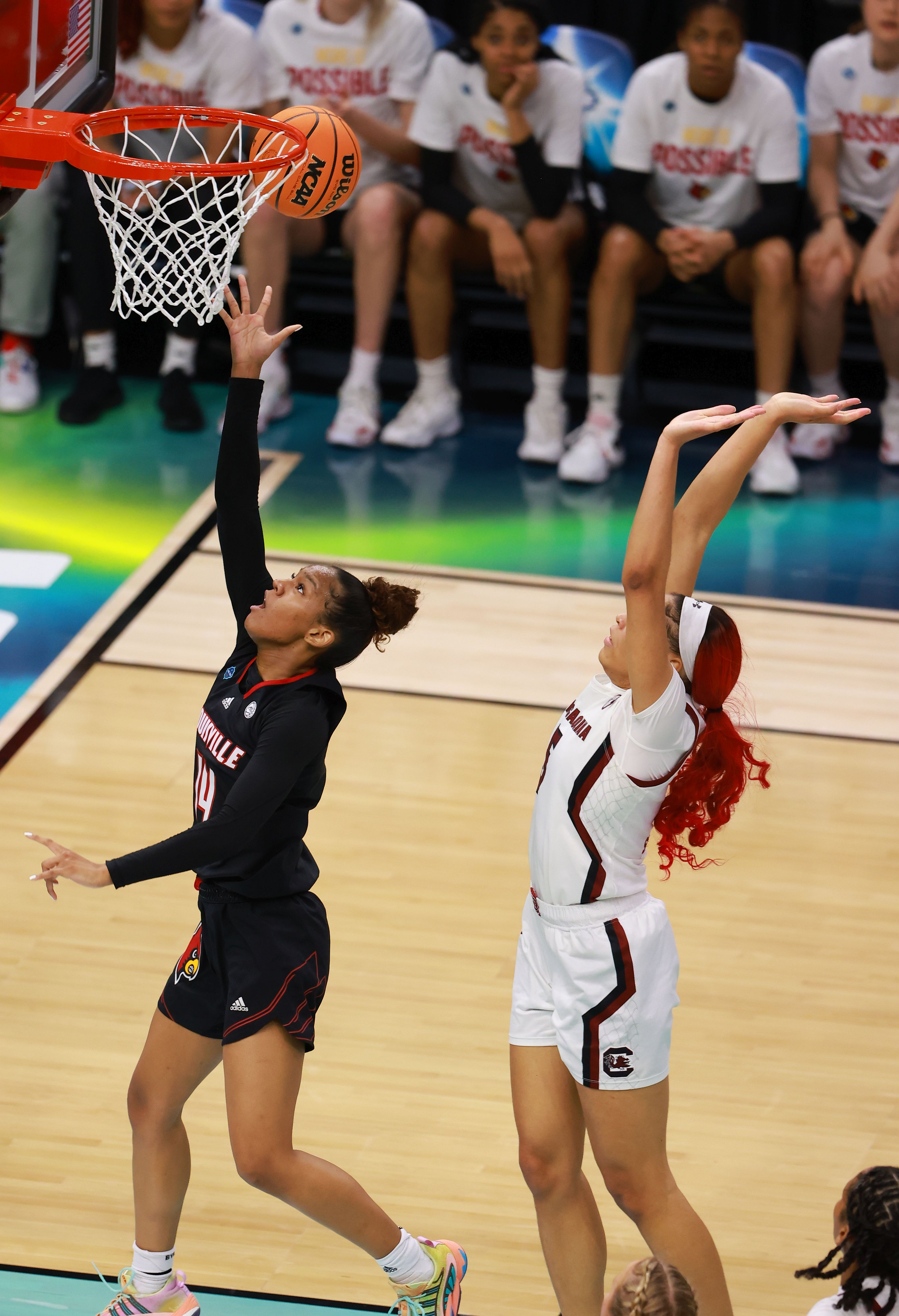
Smith (left) with Louisville at the Final Four of the 2022 NCAA tournament

On November 24, 2017, Smith recorded 17 points and 12 assists for California in an 87–66 win against Manhattan. She was named National Freshman of the Week by the United States Basketball Writers Association after posting 14 points, eight assists and four rebounds in a 62–52 victory over Kentucky on December 21. At the first round of the NCAA Division I Tournament on March 16, 2018, Smith recorded a season-high 20 points and eight assists in a 68–62 loss to Virginia. As a freshman, Smith averaged 8.6 points and 4.8 assists per game, earning Pac-12 All-Freshman honors. On February 8, 2019, she scored a sophomore season-high 20 points in a 105–82 loss to third-ranked Oregon. She averaged 9.8 points per game as a sophomore.

Following her sophomore season, Smith transferred to Louisville, and sat out for one season as a redshirt due to NCAA transfer rules. She was drawn to Louisville because of head coach Jeff Walz's history of developing Women's National Basketball Association (WNBA) players, to learn from future professional players on the team and to contend for a national title. During her redshirt year, Smith was a member of the scout team and regularly played one-on-one against Jazmine Jones. Before her junior season, she was appointed a team co-captain with Dana Evans. Smith missed the first two games of the season with an illness, but made her Louisville debut on December 4, 2020. During the game, she recorded a season-high 21 points, six rebounds and six assists in a 116–75 win against DePaul. On February 11, 2021, she scored 21 points again in an 85–70 win against Georgia Tech. Smith helped guide her team to a runner-up finish at the 2021 ACC tournament and made the all-tournament first team. As a junior, she averaged 11.4 points and 2.2 assists per game. Smith assumed a leading role for Louisville as a senior with the graduation of Evans. On December 16, she scored a career-high 22 points, shooting 5-of-7 from three-point range, in an 82–38 win against Eastern Kentucky. Smith helped Louisville reach the Final Four of the NCAA tournament. As a senior, she averaged 12 points, three rebounds and 2.7 assists per game.

== Professional career ==
Smith was selected in the second round, with the 16th overall pick, in the 2022 WNBA draft by the Los Angeles Sparks. Following the preseason, she was waived by the Sparks on May 4. Smith returned to the team on July 4 after signing a seven-day hardship contract. She played in two games and re-signed with the Sparks on another seven-day contract on July 26. On August 2, Smith signed with the team for the rest of the season. As a rookie, she averaged 2.6 points and shot 31.4 percent from the field in 10.3 minutes per game. Smith was traded on January 16, 2023, to the Connecticut Sun.

On September 16, 2022, Smith was selected with the first pick in the Women's Korean Basketball League (WKBL) draft by Samsung Life Blueminx. She made her debut on November 1, posting 21 points, five assists and four rebounds in an 85–69 win over Bucheon Hana 1Q. Smith set the rookie single-game scoring record in her first game.

== Career statistics ==
Legend
GP	Games played	GS	Games started	MPG	Minutes per game	RPG	Rebounds per game
APG	Assists per game	SPG	Steals per game	BPG	Blocks per game	PPG	Points per game
TO	Turnovers per game	FG%	Field-goal percentage	3P%	3-point field-goal percentage	FT%	Free-throw percentage
**Bold**	Career best	°	League leader

=== WNBA Regular season ===
Year	Team	GP	GS	MPG	FG%	3P%	FT%	RPG	APG	SPG	BPG	TO	PPG
2022	Los Angeles	11	0	10.3	.314	.278	1.000	0.8	0.5	0.4	0.0	0.4	2.6
Career	1 year, 1 team	11	0	10.3	.314	.278	1.000	0.8	0.5	0.4	0.0	0.4	2.6

=== College ===
Year	Team	GP	GS	MPG	FG%	3P%	FT%	RPG	APG	SPG	BPG	TO	PPG
2017–18	California	32	31	31.8	38.6	31.9	68.6	2.7	**4.8**	0.8	0.2	2.3	8.6
2018–19	California	33	33	**33.7**	39.9	35.0	65.5	2.4	2.8	0.6	**0.5**	1.7	9.8
2019–20	Louisville	1	0	0.0	0.0	0.0	0.0	0.0	0.0	0.0	0.0	0.0	0.0
2020–21	Louisville	28	20	27.8	**44.4**	**37.9**	**80.0**	**3.9**	2.2	0.9	0.4	**1.1**	11.4
2021–22	Louisville	**34**	**34**	28.9	42.9	36.7	68.8	3.0	2.7	**1.0**	0.3	1.3	**12.0**
**Career**		128	118	30.4	41.6	35.6	70.0	2.9	3.1	0.8	0.3	1.6	10.4
Statistics retrieved from Sports-Reference.

== Personal life ==
Smith is the daughter of Kelly and John Smith. Her mother is South Korean and her father, who is American, serves as head men's basketball coach at Cal Poly and played collegiately at UNLV and Dominican University of California. Her older brother, Jamal, played basketball for Cal State Fullerton and Cal Poly before turning professional, and she has a younger sister, Kylee. Smith's grandfather, Fred "Lucky" Smith, was drafted by the Milwaukee Bucks in the 1968 NBA draft following a college career at Hawaii. Her uncle, Steve, served as an assistant coach for the Connecticut Sun of the WNBA.
