= 2019–20 Louisville Cardinals women's basketball team =

Intercollegiate basketball season

2019–20 Louisville Cardinals women's basketball

ACC regular season champions Paradise Jam champions
- Conference: Atlantic Coast Conference

Ranking
- Coaches: No. 7
- AP: No. 6
- Record: 28–4 (16–2 ACC)
- Head coach: Jeff Walz (13th season)
- Assistant coaches: Stephanie Norman; Sam Purcell; Jonneshia Pineda
- Home arena: KFC Yum! Center

2019–20 ACC women's basketball standings
	Conf.				Overall
Team	W		L	PCT	W		L	PCT
No. 6 Louisville	16	–	2	.889	28	–	4	.875
No. 8 NC State†	14	–	4	.778	28	–	4	.875
Duke	12	–	6	.667	18	–	12	.600
No. 18 Florida State	11	–	7	.611	24	–	8	.750
Virginia Tech	11	–	7	.611	21	–	9	.700
Boston College	11	–	7	.611	20	–	12	.625
Georgia Tech	10	–	8	.556	20	–	11	.645
Syracuse	9	–	9	.500	16	–	15	.516
Virginia	8	–	10	.444	13	–	17	.433
Notre Dame	8	–	10	.444	13	–	18	.419
Miami (FL)	7	–	11	.389	15	–	15	.500
North Carolina	7	–	11	.389	16	–	14	.533
Wake Forest	7	–	11	.389	16	–	16	.500
Clemson	3	–	15	.167	8	–	23	.258
Pittsburgh	1	–	17	.056	5	–	26	.161
† 2020 ACC tournament winner As of March 5, 2020; Rankings from AP poll

The 2019–20 Louisville Cardinals women's basketball team represented the University of Louisville during the 2019–20 NCAA Division I women's basketball season. The Cardinals, were led by 13th-year head coach Jeff Walz, and played their home games at the KFC Yum! Center in their sixth year in the Atlantic Coast Conference.

The Cardinals finished the season 28–4 and 16–2 in ACC play. They finished as the regular season ACC champions and earned the first seed in the ACC tournament. They defeated Syracuse in the Quarterfinals before losing to eventual champions NC State in the Semifinals. The NCAA tournament was cancelled due to the COVID-19 outbreak.

== Previous season ==
The Cardinals finished the 2018–19 season at 32–4, 14–2 in ACC play to finish in a tie for first place. They advanced to the championship game of the ACC women's tournament where they lost to Notre Dame. They received an at-large for the NCAA women's tournament as a number one seed in the Albany Region. In the tournament, they defeated Robert Morris and Michigan in the first and second rounds, Oregon State in the sweet sixteen before losing to Connecticut in the elite eight.

== Off-season ==
=== Recruiting class ===
College recruiting
Name	Hometown	School	Height	Weight	Commit date
Nyah Green; G	Allen, Texas	Allen High School	6 ft 1 in (1.85 m)	N/A	
Nyah Green; G	Recruit ratings: ESPN: (98)				
Norika Konno; PG	Sendai, Japan	Seiwa Gakuen	5 ft 10 in (1.78 m)	N/A	
Norika Konno; PG	Recruit ratings: ESPN: (90)				
Ramani Parker; F	Fresno, California	Montverde Academy	6 ft 4 in (1.93 m)	N/A	
Ramani Parker; F	Recruit ratings: ESPN: (90)				
Overall recruit ranking:
Note: In many cases, Scout, Rivals, 247Sports, On3, and ESPN may conflict in their listings of height and weight.; In these cases, the average was taken. ESPN grades are on a 100-point scale.; Sources:

== Roster ==
2019–20 Louisville Cardinals women's basketball team
Players
Coaches

Pos.	#	Name	Height	Year	Previous school	Hometown
F	0	Ramani Parker	6 ft 4 in (1.93 m)	Fr	Montverde Academy	Fresno, CA
G	1	Dana Evans	5 ft 6 in (1.68 m)	Jr	West Side Leadership Academy	Gary, IN
G	2	Yacine Diop	5 ft 10 in (1.78 m)	RS Sr	Seton-La Salle; Pittsburgh	Dakar, Senegal
G	3	Seygan Robins	5 ft 10 in (1.78 m)	So	Mercer County	Harrodsburg, KY
G	4	Elizabeth Balogun	6 ft 1 in (1.85 m)	So	Hamilton Heights Christian Academy; Georgia Tech	Chattanooga, TN
G	5	Mykasa Robinson	5 ft 7 in (1.7 m)	So	Ashland Blazer	Ashland, KY
G	11	Norika Konno	5 ft 10 in (1.78 m)	Fr	Seiwa Gakuen	Sendai, Japan
G	12	Lindsey Duvall	5 ft 9 in (1.75 m)	RS So	Bullitt East	Mount Washington, KY
G	14	Kianna Smith	6 ft 0 in (1.83 m)	Jr	Troy; California	Moreno Valley, CA
F	21	Kylee Shook	6 ft 4 in (1.93 m)	Sr	Mesa Ridge	Colorado Springs, CO
F	22	Elizabeth Dixon	6 ft 5 in (1.96 m)	So	Ridgeway; Georgia Tech	Memphis, TN
G	23	Jazmine Jones	6 ft 0 in (1.83 m)	Sr	Florida A&M Developmental	Tallahassee, FL
G	24	Jessica Laemmle	5 ft 2 in (1.57 m)	Sr	Mercy Academy	Louisville, KY
F	30	Molly Lockhart	6 ft 3 in (1.91 m)	RS Fr	Butler	Louisville, KY
G	31	Nyah Green	6 ft 1 in (1.85 m)	Fr	Allen	Allen, TX
F	33	Bionca Dunham	6 ft 2 in (1.88 m)	Sr	Imhotep Institute Charter	Philadelphia, PA

Head coach

- Jeff Walz (Northern Kentucky)

Assistant coach(es)

- Stephanie Norman (Arizona State)
- Sam Purcell (Auburn)
- Jonneshia Pineda (Georgia Southwestern State)

Legend

- (C) Team captain
- (S) Suspended
- (I) Ineligible
- (W) Walk-on
- Injured
- Current redshirt

Roster
Last update: November 25, 2019

== Rankings ==
Regular season ranking movement Legend: ██ Increase in ranking. ██ Decrease in ranking. ██ Not ranked the previous week. RV=Received votes.
Poll	Pre- Season	Week 2	Week 3	Week 4	Week 5	Week 6	Week 7	Week 8	Week 9	Week 10	Week 11	Week 12	Week 13	Week 14	Week 15	Week 16	Week 17	Week 18	Week 19	Final
AP	9	9	8	8	2 (5)	7	6	7	7	7	5 (2)	5 (2)	5 (1)	5 (1)	9	5	5	4	6	6
Coaches	9	9	9	2 (5)	7	7	7	7	7	4 (1)	3	4 (1)	4	9	6	5	5	6	7	N/A

Coaches did not release a Week 2 poll and AP does not release a final poll. Due to the cancellation of the NCAA Tournament, the coaches poll did not release a final ranking.

== Schedule and results ==
Date time, TV	Rank^{#}	Opponent^{#}	Result	Record	Site (attendance) city, state
Exhibition
February 2, 2020*; 2:00 p.m.	No. 5	USA	L 54–97	–	KFC Yum! Center (12,008); Louisville, KY
Regular season
November 5, 2019*; 7:00 p.m., ACCNX	No. 9	Western Kentucky	W 75–56	1–0	KFC Yum! Center (8,304); Louisville, KY
November 8, 2019*; 7:00 p.m., ACCNX	No. 9	Murray State	W 76–40	2–0	KFC Yum! Center (7,922); Louisville, KY
November 14, 2019*; 6:00 p.m., ACCN	No. 9	Central Michigan	W 76–63	3–0	KFC Yum! Center (7,605); Louisville, KY
November 21, 2019*; 6:30 p.m., ACCN	No. 8	UT Chattanooga	W 86–37	4–0	KFC Yum! Center (7,703); Louisville, KY
November 24, 2019*; 1:00 p.m., ACCNX	No. 8	Boise State	W 92–82	5–0	KFC Yum! Center (8,331); Louisville, KY
November 28, 2019*; 1:00 p.m.	No. 8	vs. UT Arlington; Paradise Jam	W 76–67	6–0	Sports and Fitness Center; St. Thomas, USVI
November 29, 2019*; 1:00 p.m.	No. 8	vs. Oklahoma State; Paradise Jam	W 69–48	7–0	Sports and Fitness Center; St. Thomas, USVI
November 30, 2019*; 3:15 p.m.	No. 8	vs. No. 1 Oregon; Paradise Jam	W 72–62	8–0	Sports and Fitness Center; St. Thomas, USVI
December 5, 2019*; 8:00 p.m., BTN	No. 2	at Ohio State; ACC–Big Ten Women's Challenge	L 60–67	8–1	Value City Arena (3,807); Columbus, OH
December 8, 2019*; 2:00 p.m.	No. 2	at Northern Kentucky	W 85–57	9–1	BB&T Arena (2,042); Highland Heights, KY
December 15, 2019*; 1:00 p.m., ESPN	No. 7	at No. 14 Kentucky; Rivalry	W 67–66	10–1	Rupp Arena (11,256); Lexington, KY
December 19, 2019*; 7:00 p.m.	No. 6	at UT Martin	W 71–63 ^{2OT}	11–1	Skyhawk Center (1,156); Martin, TN
December 29, 2019; 2:00 p.m., ESPN2	No. 7	Syracuse	W 62–58	12–1 (1–0)	KFC Yum! Center (10,084); Louisville, KY
January 2, 2020; 7:00 p.m., ACCN	No. 7	at Clemson	W 75–50	13–1 (2–0)	Littlejohn Coliseum (1,196); Clemson, SC
January 5, 2020; 2:00 p.m., ACCN	No. 7	Duke	W 60–55	14–1 (3–0)	KFC Yum! Center (10,123); Louisville, KY
January 9, 2020; 8:00 p.m., ACCN	No. 7	at Miami (FL)	W 87–41	15–1 (4–0)	Watsco Center (930); Coral Gables, FL
January 12, 2020; 2:00 p.m., ACCNX	No. 7	Wake Forest	W 75–61	16–1 (5–0)	KFC Yum! Center (9,414); Louisville, KY
January 16, 2020; 7:00 p.m., ACCNX	No. 5	at Boston College	W 81–70	17–1 (6–0)	Conte Forum (1,137); Chestnut Hill, MA
January 19, 2020; 1:00 p.m., ESPN2	No. 5	at North Carolina	W 74–67	18–1 (7–0)	Carmichael Arena (4,027); Chapel Hill, North Carolina
January 23, 2020; 8:00 p.m., RSN	No. 5	Virginia	W 71–56	19–1 (8–0)	KFC Yum! Center (7,776); Louisville, KY
January 26, 2020; 4:00 p.m., ACCN	No. 5	Pittsburgh	W 83–49	20–1 (9–0)	KFC Yum! Center (11,624); Louisville, KY
January 30, 2020; 7:00 p.m., ESPNews	No. 5	at Notre Dame	W 86–54	21–1 (10–0)	Edmund P. Joyce Center (7,719); Notre Dame, IN
February 6, 2020; 8:00 p.m., ACCN	No. 5	No. 17 Florida State	L 59–67	21–2 (10–1)	KFC Yum! Center (8,314); Louisville, KY
February 9, 2020; 2:00 p.m., ESPN2	No. 5	at Syracuse	L 51–59	21–3 (10–2)	Carrier Dome (2,894); Syracuse, NY
February 13, 2020; 8:00 p.m., ACCN	No. 9	at No. 4 NC State	W 66–59	22–3 (11–2)	Reynolds Coliseum (5,575); Raleigh, NC
February 16, 2020; 3:00 p.m., ACCN	No. 9	Notre Dame	W 82–49	23–3 (12–2)	KFC Yum! Center (12,086); Louisville, KY
February 20, 2020; 6:00 p.m., RSN	No. 5	at Georgia Tech	W 58–47	24–3 (13–2)	McCamish Pavilion (1,188); Atlanta, GA
February 23, 2020; 2:00 p.m., ACCNX	No. 5	at Pittsburgh	W 79–47	25–3 (14–2)	Petersen Events Center (2,318); Pittsburgh, PA
February 27, 2020; 6:00 p.m., ACCN	No. 5	Boston College	W 68–48	26–3 (15–2)	KFC Yum! Center (8,514); Louisville, KY
March 1, 2020; 12:00 p.m., ACCN	No. 5	Virginia Tech	W 70–53	27–3 (16–2)	KFC Yum! Center (10,423); Louisville, KY
ACC Women's Tournament
March 6, 2020; 2:00 p.m., RSN	(1) No. 4	vs. (8) Syracuse; Quarterfinals	W 71–46	28–3	Greensboro Coliseum (3,811); Greensboro, NC
March 7, 2020; 12:00 p.m., ESPNU	(1) No. 4	vs. (4) No. 22 Florida State; Semifinals	L 60–62	28–4	Greensboro Coliseum (6,751); Greensboro, NC
*Non-conference game. ^{#}Rankings from AP Poll. (#) Tournament seedings in parentheses. All times are in Eastern.
