= 2019–20 Clemson Tigers women's basketball team =

Women's college basketball season

2019–20 Clemson Tigers women's basketball
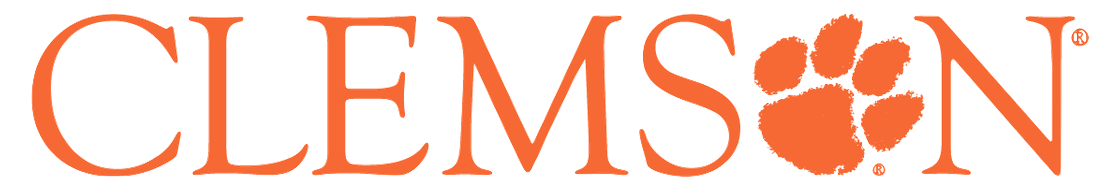
- Conference: Atlantic Coast Conference
- Record: 8–23 (3–15 ACC)
- Head coach: Amanda Butler (2nd season)
- Assistant coaches: Shimmy Grey-Miller (2nd season); Joy Cheek (2nd season); Daniel Barber (2nd season)
- Home arena: Littlejohn Coliseum

2019–20 ACC women's basketball standings
	Conf.				Overall
Team	W		L	PCT	W		L	PCT
No. 6 Louisville	16	–	2	.889	28	–	4	.875
No. 8 NC State†	14	–	4	.778	28	–	4	.875
Duke	12	–	6	.667	18	–	12	.600
No. 18 Florida State	11	–	7	.611	24	–	8	.750
Virginia Tech	11	–	7	.611	21	–	9	.700
Boston College	11	–	7	.611	20	–	12	.625
Georgia Tech	10	–	8	.556	20	–	11	.645
Syracuse	9	–	9	.500	16	–	15	.516
Virginia	8	–	10	.444	13	–	17	.433
Notre Dame	8	–	10	.444	13	–	18	.419
Miami (FL)	7	–	11	.389	15	–	15	.500
North Carolina	7	–	11	.389	16	–	14	.533
Wake Forest	7	–	11	.389	16	–	16	.500
Clemson	3	–	15	.167	8	–	23	.258
Pittsburgh	1	–	17	.056	5	–	26	.161
† 2020 ACC tournament winner As of March 5, 2020; Rankings from AP poll

The 2019–20 Clemson Tigers women's basketball team represented Clemson University during the 2019–20 college basketball season. The Tigers were led by second year head coach Amanda Butler. The Tigers, members of the Atlantic Coast Conference, played their home games at Littlejohn Coliseum.

The Tigers finished the season 8–23 and 3–15 in ACC play to finish in fourteenth place. As the fourteenth seed in the ACC tournament, they defeated Miami in the First Round before losing to Boston College in the Second Round. The NCAA tournament and WNIT were cancelled due to the COVID-19 outbreak.

Following the conclusion of the 2019–20 season, senior Kobi Thornton was drafted in the third round of the WNBA draft (27th overall) by the Atlanta Dream.

== Previous season ==
The Tigers finished the 2018–19 season 20–13, 9–7 in ACC play to finish in seventh place. They lost to Louisville in the quarterfinals of the ACC tournament. They received an at-large bid to the NCAA women's tournament—which was their first trip since 2002—where they defeated South Dakota in the first round before losing to Mississippi State in the second round.

== Offseason ==
=== Departures ===
Name	Number	Pos.	Height	Year	Hometown	Reason for departure
Danielle Edwards	5	G	5'7"	Senior	Perry Hall, MD	Graduated
Camreé Clegg	10	G	5'5"	Freshman	Westland, MI	Transferred to St. John's
Taylor Hosendove	11	G	6'1"	Freshman	Atlanta, GA	Transferred to Georgia State
Aliyah Collier	12	G	5'9"	Senior	Augusta, GA	Graduated
Simone Westbrook	20	G	5'8"	Graduate Student	Chandler, AZ	Graduated
Keniece Purvis	22	G	5'7"	(redshirt) Senior	Greensboro, NC	Graduated

=== 2019 recruiting class ===
College recruiting information
Name	Hometown	School	Height	Weight	Commit date
Danae McNeal; G	Swansea, South Carolina	Swansea High School	6 ft 0 in (1.83 m)	N/A	
Danae McNeal; G	Recruit ratings: ESPN: (96)				
Amari Robinson; F	Douglasville, Georgia	Douglas County High School	6 ft 0 in (1.83 m)	N/A	
Amari Robinson; F	Recruit ratings: ESPN: (90)				
Kaylee Sticker; G	Dawsonville, Georgia	Dawson County High School	6 ft 0 in (1.83 m)	N/A	
Kaylee Sticker; G	Recruit ratings: ESPN: (89)				
Overall recruit ranking:
Note: In many cases, Scout, Rivals, 247Sports, On3, and ESPN may conflict in their listings of height and weight.; In these cases, the average was taken. ESPN grades are on a 100-point scale.; Sources:

== Roster ==
2019–20 Clemson Tigers women's basketball team
Players
Coaches

Pos.	#	Name	Height	Year	Previous school	Hometown
G	00	Delicia Washington	5 ft 10 in (1.78 m)	Sr	Baker County; Florida	Macclenny, FL
G	1	Destiny Thomas	5 ft 10 in (1.78 m)	Jr	Pelham	Pelham, GA
G	2	Kaylee Sticker	5 ft 11 in (1.8 m)	Fr	Dawson County	Dawsonville, GA
G	3	Kendall Spray	5 ft 5 in (1.65 m)	RS Jr	Wilson Central; UT Martin	Nashville, TN
F	5	Amari Robinson	6 ft 0 in (1.83 m)	Fr	Douglas County	Douglasville, GA
G	11	Isis Lopes	5 ft 10 in (1.78 m)	Fr	Caulfield Grammar School	Melbourne, Australia
G	12	Hannah Hank	6 ft 2 in (1.88 m)	Fr	Forestville	Port Lincoln, Australia
G	21	Skylar Blackstock	5 ft 11 in (1.8 m)	So	Wando	Charleston, SC
G	22	Danae McNeal	6 ft 0 in (1.83 m)	Fr	Swansea High School	Swansea, SC
C	24	Mikayla Hayes	6 ft 3 in (1.91 m)	RS So	Park Center; Florida	Minneapolis, MN
G	31	Shania Meertens	5 ft 8 in (1.73 m)	Jr	Winter Springs; Northwest Florida State College	Winter Springs, FL
G	32	Chyna Cotton	5 ft 10 in (1.78 m)	Sr	Southwest Atlanta Christian	Monroe, GA
F	35	Nique Cherry	6 ft 1 in (1.85 m)	Jr	Heidelberg; Jones County Junior College	Laurel, MS
F	44	Kobi Thornton	6 ft 2 in (1.88 m)	Sr	Randolph-Clay	Cuthbert, GA
C	55	Tylar Bennett	6 ft 4 in (1.93 m)	Jr	Detroit Country Day	Redford, MI

Head coach

- Amanda Butler (Florida)

Assistant coach(es)

- Shimmy Gray–Miller (Michigan)
- Joy Cheek (Duke)
- Daniel Barber (Florida)

Legend

- (C) Team captain
- (S) Suspended
- (I) Ineligible
- (W) Walk-on
- Injured
- Current redshirt

Roster
Last update: October 28, 2019

== Schedule ==
Date time, TV	Rank^{#}	Opponent^{#}	Result	Record	High points	High rebounds	High assists	Site (attendance) city, state
Exhibition
October 29, 2019*; 7:00 p.m.		Lander	L 72–74	–	23 – Spray	10 – Robinson	4 – Thomas	Littlejohn Coliseum (375); Clemson, SC
Regular Season
November 6, 2019*; 7:00 p.m., ACCNX		Furman	W 77–71	1–0	16 – Tied	6 – 3 tied	6 – Spray	Littlejohn Coliseum (1,217); Clemson, SC
November 9, 2019*; 1:00 p.m., ACCNX		Navy	L 52–65	1–1	18 – Thornton	8 – Robinson	2 – 3 tied	Littlejohn Coliseum (1,184); Clemson, SC
November 12, 2019*; 7:00 p.m., ACCNX		Alabama	L 54–67	1–2	25 – Thornton	8 – Thornton	5 – Meertens	Littlejohn Coliseum (1,233); Clemson, SC
November 18, 2019*; 11:00 a.m., ACCNX		Alabama State	W 76–43	2–2	15 – Meertens	10 – Robinson	5 – Meertens	Littlejohn Coliseum (4,297); Clemson, SC
November 21, 2019*; 7:00 p.m.		at Penn State	L 55–68	2–3	16 – Thornton	8 – Robinson	5 – Spray	Bryce Jordan Center (1,740); University Park, PA
November 24, 2019*; 2:00 p.m., ACCN		No. 5 South Carolina; Rivalry	L 48–84	2–4	10 – Thornton	10 – Thornton	2 – Blackstock	Littlejohn Coliseum (2,840); Clemson, SC
November 29, 2019*; 5:45 p.m.		vs. No. 9 Maryland; Daytona Beach Invitational	L 44–63	2–5	14 – Robinson	8 – Robinson	3 – Thomas	Ocean Center (312); Daytona Beach, FL
November 30, 2019*; 8:00 p.m.		Alcorn State; Daytona Beach Invitational	W 77–46	3–5	16 – Sticker	9 – Hank	6 – Thomas	Ocean Center (103); Daytona Beach, FL
December 4, 2019*; 9:00 p.m, BTN		at Iowa; ACC–Big Ten Women's Challenge	L 60–74	3–6	17 – Thornton	5 – Tied	2 – 4 tied	Carver–Hawkeye Arena (5,884); Iowa City, IA
December 8, 2019; 12:00 p.m., ACCRSN		No. 8 Florida State	L 64–81	3–7 (0–1)	19 – Spray	9 – Thornton	4 – Meertens	Littlejohn Coliseum (1,052); Clemson, SC
December 15, 2019*; 2:00 p.m.		Mercer	W 65–61	4–7	15 – Hank	10 – Robinson	3 – Thomas	Hawkins Arena (1,484); Macon, GA
December 20, 2019*; 2:00 p.m., ACCNX		North Carolina A&T	L 74–82	4–8	27 – Robinson	9 – Thornton	7 – Thomas	Littlejohn Coliseum (1,071); Clemson, SC
December 29, 2019; 4:00 p.m., ACCRSN		at Notre Dame	W 71–55	5–8 (1–1)	24 – Spray	6 – Thornton	12 – Thomas	Joyce Center (8,569); Notre Dame, IN
January 2, 2020; 7:00 p.m., ACCNX		No. 7 Louisville	L 50–75	5–9 (1–2)	11 – Hank	9 – Cherry	1 – 4 tied	Littlejohn Coliseum (1,196); Clemson, SC
January 9, 2020; 7:00 p.m., ACCNX		at Wake Forest	L 58–63	5–10 (1–3)	14 – Spray	7 – Thornton	3 – Thomas	Lawrence Joel Veterans Memorial Coliseum (737); Winston-Salem, NC
January 12, 2020; 2:00 p.m., ACCNX		at Georgia Tech	L 47–49	5–11 (1–4)	17 – Meertens	5 – Meertens	3 – Thomas	McCamish Pavilion (1,620); Atlanta, GA
January 16, 2020; 7:00 p.m., ACCNX		Pittsburgh	W 75–67 ^{OT}	6–11 (2–4)	20 – Robinson	9 – Robinson	4 – Spray	Littlejohn Coliseum (1,329); Clemson, SC
January 19, 2020; 12:00 p.m., ESPNU		Duke	W 62–58	7–11 (3–4)	16 – Tied	12 – Spray	5 – Thomas	Littlejohn Coliseum (1,718); Clemson, SC
January 23, 2020; 6:00 p.m., ACCN		at Miami (FL)	L 64–68	7–12 (3–5)	14 – Tied	8 – Thornton	5 – Thomas	Watsco Center (1,316); Coral Gables, FL
January 26, 2020; 1:00 p.m., ACCRSN		at Virginia Tech	L 50–71	7–13 (3–6)	13 – Hayes	11 – Robinson	3 – Robinson	Cassell Coliseum (1,839); Blacksburg, VA
January 30, 2020; 7:00 p.m., ACCRSN		No. 7 NC State	L 60–79	7–14 (3–7)	14 – Meertens	6 – Hayes	3 – Meertens	Littlejohn Coliseum (1,257); Clemson, SC
February 2, 2020; 2:00 p.m., ACCNX		at North Carolina	L 72–86	7–15 (3–8)	22 – Thornton	6 – Tied	2 – 3 Tied	Carmichael Arena (1,952); Chapel Hill, NC
February 6, 2020; 7:00 p.m., ACCNX		at Virginia	L 54–70	7–16 (3–9)	19 – Robinson	8 – Robinson	3 – Thomas	John Paul Jones Arena (2,229); Charlottesville, VA
February 9, 2020; 12:00 p.m., ACCRSN		Boston College	L 68–70	7–17 (3–10)	17 – Spray	9 – Robinson	8 – Thomas	Littlejohn Coliseum (1,437); Clemson, SC
February 13, 2020; 7:00 p.m., ACCNX		Wake Forest	L 52–66	7–18 (3–11)	14 – Robinson	6 – Thornton	5 – Thomas	Littlejohn Coliseum (1,197); Clemson, SC
February 16, 2020; 1:00 p.m., ACCN		Miami (FL)	L 48–63	7–19 (3–12)	19 – Thornton	11 – Thornton	4 – Spray	Littlejohn Coliseum (1,384); Clemson, SC
February 20, 2020; 6:00 p.m., ACCN		at Syracuse	L 46–59	7–20 (3–13)	12 – Thornton	7 – Thornton	3 – Tied	Carrier Dome (1,592); Syracuse, NY
February 27, 2020; 7:00 p.m., ACCRSN		at No. 19 Florida State	L 54–81	7–21 (3–14)	13 – Thornton	7 – Cherry	4 – Thomas	Donald L. Tucker Civic Center (2,836); Tallahassee, FL
March 1, 2020; 2:00 p.m., ACCNX		Georgia Tech	L 44–56	7–22 (3–15)	11 – Thornton	6 – Meertens	3 – Meertens	Littlejohn Coliseum (1,484); Clemson, SC
ACC Women's Tournament
March 4, 2020; 6:30 p.m., RSN	(14)	vs. (11) Miami; First Round	W 71–56	8–22	27 – Thornton	7 – Thornton	4 – Spray	Greensboro Coliseum (2,795); Greensboro, NC
March 5, 2020; 8:00 p.m., RSN	(14)	vs. (6) Boston College; Second Round	L 73–85	8–23	20 – Meertens	5 – Meertens	3 – Tied	Greensboro Coliseum (3,638); Greensboro, NC
*Non-conference game. ^{#}Rankings from AP Poll. (#) Tournament seedings in parentheses. All times are in Eastern.

== Rankings ==
Regular season polls
Poll	Pre- Season	Week 2	Week 3	Week 4	Week 5	Week 6	Week 7	Week 8	Week 9	Week 10	Week 11	Week 12	Week 13	Week 14	Week 15	Week 16	Week 17	Week 18	Week 19	Final
AP																				N/A
Coaches																				

Legend
	Increase in ranking
	Decrease in ranking
	Not ranked previous week
(RV)	Received Votes

== See also ==
- 2019–20 Clemson Tigers men's basketball team
