= 2019–20 Notre Dame Fighting Irish women's basketball team =

Intercollegiate basketball season

2019–20 Notre Dame Fighting Irish women's basketball
- Conference: Atlantic Coast Conference
- Record: 13–18 (8–10 ACC)
- Head coach: Muffet McGraw (33rd season)
- Associate head coach: Carol Owens (20th season)
- Assistant coaches: Beth Cunningham (8th season); Michaela Mabrey (1st season)
- Home arena: Edmund P. Joyce Center

2019–20 ACC women's basketball standings
	Conf.				Overall
Team	W		L	PCT	W		L	PCT
No. 6 Louisville	16	–	2	.889	28	–	4	.875
No. 8 NC State†	14	–	4	.778	28	–	4	.875
Duke	12	–	6	.667	18	–	12	.600
No. 18 Florida State	11	–	7	.611	24	–	8	.750
Virginia Tech	11	–	7	.611	21	–	9	.700
Boston College	11	–	7	.611	20	–	12	.625
Georgia Tech	10	–	8	.556	20	–	11	.645
Syracuse	9	–	9	.500	16	–	15	.516
Virginia	8	–	10	.444	13	–	17	.433
Notre Dame	8	–	10	.444	13	–	18	.419
Miami (FL)	7	–	11	.389	15	–	15	.500
North Carolina	7	–	11	.389	16	–	14	.533
Wake Forest	7	–	11	.389	16	–	16	.500
Clemson	3	–	15	.167	8	–	23	.258
Pittsburgh	1	–	17	.056	5	–	26	.161
† 2020 ACC tournament winner As of March 5, 2020; Rankings from AP poll

The 2019–20 Notre Dame Fighting Irish women's basketball team represented the University of Notre Dame during the 2019–20 NCAA Division I women's basketball season. The Fighting Irish, led by 33rd year head coach Muffet McGraw, played their home games at Edmund P. Joyce Center as members of the Atlantic Coast Conference.

The Fighting Irish finished the season 13–18 and 8–10 in ACC play to finish in a tie for ninth place. As the tenth seed in the ACC tournament, they lost to Pittsburgh in the First Round. The NCAA tournament and WNIT were cancelled due to the COVID-19 outbreak.

== Previous season ==
The Fighting Irish finished the 2018–19 season at 35–4, 14–2 in ACC play to finish in a tie for first place. With a bye in the second round of the ACC women's tournament they would beat North Carolina in the quarterfinals and then would go on to beat Syracuse in the semifinals. In the rematch of the 2017 championship game the Fighting Irish would avenge that lose by beating Louisville. They received an automatic bid for the NCAA women's tournament as a number one seed in the Chicago Regional. The Fighting Irish made it to the Championship game by beating Bethune-Cookman, Michigan State, Texas A&M, Stanford, and Connecticut. In the championship game against Baylor, the Lady Bears got out to and early lead in the first quarter 25–14 and would lead at halftime by double digits 43–31. The Fighting Irish would outscore the Lady Bears in the third and fourth quarters and would have the lead 77–76 late in the fourth quarter, but Baylor found a way to win 82–81.

== Offseason ==
=== Departures ===
Name	Number	Pos.	Height	Year	Hometown	Notes
Jordan Nixon	0	G	5'8"	Freshman	New York City, NY	Transferred to Texas A&M
Marina Mabrey	2	G	5'8"	Senior	Belmar, NJ	Drafted in the 2019 WNBA draft (2nd round, 19th overall)
Jackie Young	5	G	6'0"	Junior	Princeton, IN	Drafted in the 2019 WNBA Draft (1st round, 1st overall)
Brianna Turner	11	F	6'3"	Red-shirt Senior	Pearland, TX	Drafted in the 2019 WNBA Draft (1st round, 11th overall)
Arike Ogunbowale	24	G	5'8"	Senior	Milwaukee, WI	Drafted in the 2019 WNBA Draft (1st round, 5th overall)
Jessica Shepard	32	F	6'5"	Senior	Fremont, NE	Drafted in the 2019 WNBA Draft (2nd round, 16th overall)
Danielle Patterson	33	F	6'2"	Sophomore	Brooklyn, NY	Transferred to Indiana
Maureen Butler	40	F	6'1"	Senior	Lionia, MI	Graduated

=== 2019 recruiting class ===
College recruiting
Name	Hometown	School	Height	Weight	Commit date
Samantha Brunelle; F	Ruckersville, VA	William Monroe High School	6 ft 2 in (1.88 m)	N/A	
Samantha Brunelle; F	Recruit ratings: ESPN: (98)				
Anaya Peoples; PG	Danville, IL	Schlarman Academy	5 ft 10 in (1.78 m)	N/A	
Anaya Peoples; PG	Recruit ratings: ESPN: (98)				
Overall recruit ranking:
Note: In many cases, Scout, Rivals, 247Sports, On3, and ESPN may conflict in their listings of height and weight.; In these cases, the average was taken. ESPN grades are on a 100-point scale.; Sources:

=== Incoming transfers ===
Name	Number	Pos.	Height	Year	Hometown	Notes
Marta Sniezek	13	G	5'8"	Graduate Transfer	McLean, VA	Transferred from Stanford
Destinee Walker	24	G	5'10"	Graduate Transfer	Orlando, FL	Transferred from North Carolina

== Roster ==
2018–19 Notre Dame Fighting Irish women's basketball team
Players
Coaches

Pos.	#	Name	Height	Year	Previous school	Hometown
G	2	Kaitlin Cole	5 ft 10 in (1.78 m)	Sr	Sylvania Northview	Toledo, OH
G	3	Margaret Murdock (W)	5 ft 8 in (1.73 m)	So	New Trier High School	Glencoe, IL
G	5	Catherine Murdock (W)	5 ft 8 in (1.73 m)	So	New Trier High School	Glencoe, IL
G	10	Katlyn Gilbert	5 ft 10 in (1.78 m)	Fr	Heritage Christian	Indianapolis, IN
G	12	Abby Prohaska	5 ft 10 in (1.78 m)	Fr	Lakota West	Liberty Township, OH
G	13	Marta Sniezek	5 ft 8 in (1.73 m)	Sr	National Cathedral; Stanford	McLean, VA
G	20	Nicole Benz	5 ft 8 in (1.73 m)	Jr	William S. Hart	Valencia, CA
G	21	Anaya Peoples	5 ft 10 in (1.78 m)	Fr	Schlarman Academy	Danville, IL
F	22	Danielle Cosgrove	6 ft 4 in (1.93 m)	So	Sachem East	Holbrook, NY
G	24	Destinee Walker	5 ft 10 in (1.78 m)	Sr	Lake Highland Prep; North Carolina	Orlando, FL
C	30	Mikayla Vaughn	6 ft 3 in (1.91 m)	Jr	Paul VI Catholic	Philadelphia, PA
F	33	Sam Brunelle	6 ft 2 in (1.88 m)	Fr	William Monroe High School	Ruckersville, VA
F	40	Kathleen Keyes (W)	4 ft 11 in (1.5 m)	Fr	Ridgewood High School	Ridgewood, NJ

Head coach

- Muffet McGraw (Saint Joseph's)

Assistant coach(es)

- Carol Owens (Northern Illinois)
- Beth Cunningham (Notre Dame)
- Michaela Mabrey (Notre Dame)

Legend

- (C) Team captain
- (S) Suspended
- (I) Ineligible
- (W) Walk-on
- Injured
- Current redshirt

Roster
Last update: November 30, 2019

== Schedule and results ==
Date time, TV	Rank^{#}	Opponent^{#}	Result	Record	Site (attendance) city, state
Non-conference Regular season
November 5, 2019*; 7:00 pm, ESPN+	No. 16	at Fordham	W 60–55	1–0	Rose Hill Gymnasium (3,200); Bronx, NY
November 8, 2019*; 6:30 pm, ACCNX	No. 16	Loyola-Maryland	W 84–60	2–0	Edmund P. Joyce Center (7,613); South Bend, IN
November 11, 2019*; 7:00 pm, ESPN2	No. 15	Tennessee	L 63–74	2–1	Edmund P. Joyce Center (7,801); South Bend, IN
November 14, 2019*; 8:00 pm, ACCN	No. 15	No. 16 Michigan State	L 69–72	2–2	Edmund P. Joyce Center (7,556); South Bend, IN
November 20, 2019*; 7:00 pm, ACCNX		Toledo	W 54–51	3–2	Edmund P. Joyce Center (7,269); South Bend, IN
November 23, 2019*; 7:00 pm, BTN Plus		at No. 21 Michigan	W 76–72	4–2	Crisler Center (4,008); Ann Arbor, MI
November 28, 2019*; 1:30 pm		vs. Florida Gulf Coast; Cancún Challenge	L 60–69	4–3	Hard Rock Hotel Riviera (235); Cancún, Mexico
November 29, 2019*; 11:00 am		vs. South Dakota State; Cancún Challenge	L 59–65	4–4	Hard Rock Hotel Riviera (259); Cancún, Mexico
November 30, 2019*; 11:00 am		vs. No. 21 South Florida; Cancún Challenge	W 67–51	5–4	Hard Rock Hotel Riviera (174); Cancún, Mexico
December 4, 2019*; 8:00 pm, ACCN		Minnesota; ACC-Big Ten Women's Challenge	L 67–75	5–5	Edmund P. Joyce Center (7,093); South Bend, IN
December 8, 2019*; 4:00 pm, ESPN		at No. 4 Connecticut; Jimmy V Classic/Rivalry	L 57–81	5–6	Harry A. Gampel Pavilion (10,167); Storrs, CT
December 11, 2019*; 6:30 pm, ACCN		No. 16 DePaul	L 94–105	5–7	Edmund P. Joyce Center (7,148); South Bend, IN
Exhibition
December 21, 2019*; 1:00 pm		Guelph	W 92–61	5–7	Edmund P. Joyce Center (7,286); South Bend, IN
ACC Regular season
December 29, 2019; 4:00 pm, ACCRSN		Clemson	L 55–71	5–8 (0–1)	Edmund P. Joyce Center (8,569); South Bend, IN
January 2, 2020; 7:00 pm, ACCNX		at Pittsburgh	W 60–52	6–8 (1–1)	Petersen Events Center (1,368); Pittsburgh, PA
January 5, 2020; 4:00 pm, ACCN		at Syracuse	L 63–74 ^{OT}	6–9 (1–2)	Carrier Dome (4,306); Syracuse, NY
January 9, 2020; 7:00 pm, ACCNX		Boston College	L 65–75	6–10 (1–3)	Edmund P. Joyce Center (7,487); South Bend, IN
January 12, 2020; 4:00 pm, ACCN		No. 9 NC State	L 56–90	6–11 (1–4)	Edmund P. Joyce Center (7,861); South Bend, IN
January 16, 2020; 8:00 pm, ACCN		at Duke	L 47–50	6–12 (1–5)	Cameron Indoor Stadium (3,022); Durham, NC
January 19, 2020; 1:00 pm, ACCN		Miami (FL)	W 76–53	7–12 (2–5)	Edmund P. Joyce Center (8,059); South Bend, IN
January 26, 2020; 2:00 pm, ACCNX		at Virginia	L 60–90	7–13 (2–6)	John Paul Jones Arena (5,117); Charlottesville, VA
January 30, 2020; 7:00 pm, ESPNews		No. 5 Louisville	L 54–86	7–14 (2–7)	Edmund P. Joyce Center (7,719); South Bend, IN
February 2, 2020; 2:00 pm, ACCN		at Georgia Tech	W 59–51	8–14 (3–7)	McCamish Pavilion (1,749); Atlanta, GA
February 6, 2020; 7:00 pm, ACCNX		at Wake Forest	W 75–71	9–14 (4–7)	LJVM Coliseum (760); Winston-Salem, NC
February 9, 2020; 4:00 pm, ACCN		Pittsburgh	W 74–52	10–14 (5–7)	Edmund P. Joyce Center (7,916); South Bend, IN
February 13, 2020; 7:00 pm, ACCNX		at Boston College	L 55–56	10–15 (5–8)	Conte Forum (1,318); Chestnut Hill, MA
February 16, 2020; 3:00 pm, ACCN		at No. 9 Louisville	L 49–82	10–16 (5–9)	KFC Yum! Center (12,086); Louisville, KY
February 20, 2020; 8:00 pm, ACCRSN		Virginia Tech	L 62–68	10–17 (5–10)	Edmund P. Joyce Center (7,401); South Bend, IN
February 23, 2020; 12:00 pm, ACCN		Syracuse	W 72–70	11–17 (6–10)	Edmund P. Joyce Center (8,086); South Bend, IN
February 27, 2020; 7:00 pm, ACCNX		North Carolina	W 83–65	12–17 (7–10)	Edmund P. Joyce Center (7,639); South Bend, IN
March 1, 2020; 2:00 pm, ESPN2		at No. 19 Florida State	W 70–67	13–17 (8–10)	Donald L. Tucker Center (4,360); Tallahassee, FL
ACC Women's Tournament
March 4, 2020; 3:30 pm, RSN	(10)	vs. (15) Pittsburgh; First round	L 65–67	13–18	Greensboro, NC (2,795); Greensboro Coliseum
*Non-conference game. ^{#}Rankings from AP Poll. (#) Tournament seedings in parentheses. All times are in Eastern.

== Rankings ==
2019–20 NCAA Division I women's basketball rankings

Regular season polls
Poll	Pre- Season	Week 2	Week 3	Week 4	Week 5	Week 6	Week 7	Week 8	Week 9	Week 10	Week 11	Week 12	Week 13	Week 14	Week 15	Week 16	Week 17	Week 18	Week 19	Week 20	Final
AP	16	15	RV	RV	RV																
Coaches	14	RV	RV	RV																	

Legend
	Increase in ranking
	Decrease in ranking
	No change
(RV)	Received votes
(NR)	Not ranked
