= 2016–17 Louisville Cardinals women's basketball team =

Intercollegiate basketball season

2016–17 Louisville Cardinals women's basketball

NCAA tournament, Sweet Sixteen
- Conference: Atlantic Coast Conference

Ranking
- Coaches: No. 12
- AP: No. 13
- Record: 29–8 (12–4 ACC)
- Head coach: Jeff Walz (10th season)
- Assistant coaches: Stephanie Norman; Samantha Williams; Sam Purcell
- Home arena: KFC Yum! Center

2016–17 ACC women's basketball standings
	Conf.				Overall
Team	W		L	PCT	W		L	PCT
No. 2 Notre Dame^{†}	15	–	1	.938	33	–	4	.892
No. 9 Duke	13	–	3	.813	28	–	6	.824
No. 10 Florida State	13	–	3	.813	28	–	7	.800
No. 13 Louisville	12	–	4	.750	29	–	8	.784
No. 17 NC State	12	–	4	.750	23	–	9	.719
No. 21 Syracuse	11	–	5	.688	22	–	11	.667
No. 16 Miami (FL)	10	–	6	.625	24	–	9	.727
Virginia	7	–	9	.438	20	–	13	.606
Wake Forest	6	–	10	.375	16	–	16	.500
Georgia Tech	5	–	11	.313	22	–	14	.611
Virginia Tech	4	–	12	.250	20	–	14	.588
Pittsburgh	4	–	12	.250	13	–	17	.433
Clemson	3	–	13	.188	15	–	16	.484
North Carolina	3	–	13	.188	15	–	16	.484
Boston College	2	–	14	.125	9	–	21	.300
† 2017 ACC tournament winner As of March 29, 2017; Rankings from AP poll

The 2016–17 Louisville Cardinals women's basketball team represented the University of Louisville during the 2016–17 NCAA Division I women's basketball season. The Cardinals, led by tenth-year head coach Jeff Walz, played their home games at the KFC Yum! Center and were in their third year in the Atlantic Coast Conference. They finished the season 29–8, 12–4 in ACC play to finish in a tie for fourth place. They advanced to the semifinals of the ACC women's tournament where they lost to Notre Dame. They received an at-large bid to the NCAA women's tournament where they defeated Chattanooga and Tennessee in the first and second rounds before losing to Baylor in the Sweet Sixteen.

== Roster ==
2016–17 Louisville Cardinals women's basketball team
Players
Coaches

Pos.	#	Name	Height	Year	Previous school	Hometown
G	0	Briahanna Jackson	5 ft 6 in (1.68 m)	RS Sr	IMG Academy/Freedom; UCF	Tampa, Florida
F	2	Myisha Hines-Allen	6 ft 2 in (1.88 m)	Jr	Montclair	Montclair, New Jersey
F	3	Sam Fuehring	6 ft 3 in (1.91 m)	Jr	Immaculate Conception	Wanaque, New Jersey
F	4	Mariya Moore	6 ft 0 in (1.83 m)	Jr	Salesian	Hercules, California
G	10	Sydney Zambrotta	5 ft 9 in (1.75 m)	Fr	Christ the King	North Babylon, New York
G	11	Arica Carter	5 ft 8 in (1.73 m)	Jr	Lloyd C. Bird	Long Beach, California
F	13	Cortnee Walton	6 ft 3 in (1.91 m)	RS Sr	St. Mary's	Surprise, Arizona
G	15	Taylor Johnson	5 ft 7 in (1.7 m)	RS Sr	Lincoln-Way East; Loyola-Chicago	Frankfort, Illinois
F	21	Kylee Shook	6 ft 4 in (1.93 m)	Fr	Mesa Ridge	Colorado Springs, Colorado
G	22	Brianna Jones	5 ft 9 in (1.75 m)	So	North Babylon	North Babylon, New York
G	23	Jazmine Jones	6 ft 0 in (1.83 m)	Fr	Florida A&M Developmental	Tallahassee, Florida
G	24	Jessica Laemmle	5 ft 2 in (1.57 m)	Fr	Mercy Academy	Louisville, Kentucky
G	25	Asia Durr	5 ft 10 in (1.78 m)	So	St. Pius X Catholic	Douglasville, Georgia
F	33	Bionca Dunham	6 ft 2 in (1.88 m)	Fr	Imhotep Institute Charter	Philadelphia, Pennsylvania
C	40	Ciera Johnson	6 ft 4 in (1.93 m)	Fr	Ducanville	Duncanville, Texas

Head coach

- Jeff Walz (Northern Kentucky)

Assistant coach(es)

- Stephanie Norman (Arizona State)
- Samantha Williams (Auburn)
- Sam Purcell (Auburn)

Legend

- (C) Team captain
- (S) Suspended
- (I) Ineligible
- (W) Walk-on
- Injured
- Current redshirt

== Media ==
Once again select Cardinals games will be broadcast on WHAS. Some of the games will be on the ACC RSN. Additional ACC games will air on ESPN3.

All Cardinals basketball games will air on Learfield Sports on WKRD 790 AM or WVKY 101.7 FM, depending on conflicts with Louisville and Kentucky football and men's basketball games.

== Schedule ==
Date time, TV	Rank^{#}	Opponent^{#}	Result	Record	Site (attendance) city, state
Exhibition
11/06/2016*; 2:00 pm	No. 5	Lindsey Wilson	W 94–50		KFC Yum! Center (1,927); Louisville, KY
Regular season
11/11/2016*; 8:00 pm	No. 5	at UT Martin	W 100–57	1–0	Skyhawk Arena (3,351); Martin, TN
11/13/2016*; 2:00 pm, ACCN Extra	No. 5	Belmont	W 73–50	2–0	KFC Yum! Center (8,347); Louisville, KY
11/16/2016*; 8:00 pm	No. 5	at Middle Tennessee	W 91–72	3–0	Murphy Center (4,516); Murfreesboro, TN
11/19/2016*; 4:30 pm, ACCN Extra	No. 5	Bowling Green; Hall of Fame Women's Challenge	W 83–58	4–0	KFC Yum! Center (8,194); Louisville, KY
11/20/2016*; 4:30 pm, ACCN Extra	No. 5	Lafayette; Hall of Fame Women's Challenge	W 92–48	5–0	KFC Yum! Center (7,668); Louisville, KY
11/21/2016*; 7:30 pm, ACCN Extra	No. 4	Chattanooga; Hall of Fame Women's Challenge	W 63–47	6–0	KFC Yum! Center (7,719); Louisville, KY
11/27/2016*; 1:00 pm, ESPN2	No. 4	vs. No. 3 South Carolina; Hall of Fame Women's Challenge	L 59–83	6–1	MassMutual Center; Springfield, MA
12/01/2016*; 7:00 pm, ACCN Extra	No. 7	No. 5 Maryland; ACC–Big Ten Women's Challenge	L 72–78	6–2	KFC Yum! Center (7,816); Louisville, KY
12/04/2016*; 2:00 pm, ACCN Extra	No. 7	No. 17 Kentucky; The Battle for the Bluegrass	W 69–67 ^{OT}	7–2	KFC Yum! Center (12,245); Louisville, KY
12/11/2016*; 2:00 pm, ACCN Extra	No. 8	WKU	W 68–61	8–2	KFC Yum! Center (9,168); Louisville, KY
12/14/2016*; 7:00 pm, ACCN Extra	No. 8	South Dakota State	W 83–30	9–2	KFC Yum! Center (7,408); Louisville, KY
12/16/2016*; 7:00 pm, ACCN Extra	No. 8	College of Charleston	W 86–58	10–2	KFC Yum! Center (7,567); Louisville, KY
12/18/2016*; 2:00 pm, ACCN Extra	No. 8	Evansville	W 89–47	11–2	KFC Yum! Center (8,320); Louisville, KY
12/21/2016*; 8:00 pm	No. 8	at Vanderbilt	W 78–66	12–2	Memorial Gymnasium (2,779); Nashville, TN
12/28/2016; 7:00 pm, ACCN Extra	No. 8	No. 25 Syracuse	W 91–76	13–2 (1–0)	KFC Yum! Center (8,586); Louisville, KY
01/02/2017; 7:00 pm, ESPNU	No. 8	at No. 13 Duke	L 55–58	13–3 (1–1)	Cameron Indoor Stadium (3,309); Durham, NC
01/05/2017; 7:00 pm, ACCN Extra	No. 8	at Virginia	W 86–81 ^{OT}	14–3 (2–1)	John Paul Jones Arena (2,490); Charlottesville, VA
01/08/2017; 4:00 pm, RSN	No. 8	Pittsburgh	W 73–52	15–3 (3–1)	KFC Yum! Center (8,039); Louisville, KY
01/12/2017; 4:00 pm, ACCN Extra	No. 9	at No. 7 Florida State	L 65–72	15–4 (3–2)	Donald L. Tucker Center (4,092); Tallahassee, FL
01/15/2017; 1:30 pm, ESPN2	No. 9	No. 14 Miami (FL)	W 63–59	16–4 (4–2)	KFC Yum! Center (10,016); Louisville, KY
01/18/2017; 7:00 pm, ACCN Extra	No. 9	Georgia Tech	W 91–51	17–4 (5–2)	KFC Yum! Center (7,606); Louisville, KY
01/22/2017*; 2:00 pm, ESPN2	No. 9	at No. 23 South Florida	W 66–52	18–4	USF Sun Dome (2,334); Tampa, FL
01/26/2017; 7:00 pm, ACCN Extra	No. 9	at Clemson	W 60–46	19–4 (6–2)	Littlejohn Coliseum (352); Clemson, SC
01/29/2017; 2:00 pm, ACCN Extra	No. 9	at Pittsburgh	W 63–48	20–4 (7–2)	Petersen Events Center (3,152); Pittsburgh, PA
02/02/2017; 7:00 pm, ACCN Extra	No. 9	No. 19 NC State	L 70–72	20–5 (7–3)	KFC Yum! Center (8,251); Louisville, KY
02/06/2017; 7:00 pm, ESPN2	No. 12	at No. 7 Notre Dame	L 66–85	20–6 (7–4)	Edmund P. Joyce Center (8,325); South Bend, IN
02/09/2017; 7:00 pm, ACCN Extra	No. 12	at Virginia Tech	W 88–70	21–6 (8–4)	Cassell Coliseum (1,723); Blacksburg, VA
02/12/2017; 3:00 pm, RSN	No. 12	Boston College	W 68–43	22–6 (9–4)	KFC Yum! Center (9,306); Louisville, KY
02/19/2017; 12:00 pm, ESPNU	No. 14	North Carolina	W 87–57	23–6 (10–4)	KFC Yum! Center (9,739); Louisville, KY
02/23/2017; 7:00 pm, ACCN Extra	No. 14	Virginia	W 66–55	24–6 (11–4)	KFC Yum! Center (7,981); Louisville, KY
02/26/2017; 2:00 pm, ACCN Extra	No. 14	at Wake Forest	W 75–46	25–6 (12–4)	LJVM Coliseum (1,297); Winston-Salem, NC
ACC Women's Tournament
03/02/2017; 11:00 am, RSN	(5) No. 14	vs. (13) Clemson; Second Round	W 68–46	26–6	HTC Center (2,613); Conway, SC
03/03/2017; 11:00 am, RSN	(5) No. 14	vs. (4) No. 17 NC State; Quarterfinals	W 59–58	27–6	HTC Center (3,004); Conway, SC
03/04/2017; 12:00 pm, ESPNU	(5) No. 14	vs. (1) No. 3 Notre Dame; Semifinals	L 73–84	27–7	HTC Center (3,600); Conway, SC
NCAA Women's Tournament
03/18/2017*; 1:30 pm, ESPN2	(4 O) No. 13	(13 O) Chattanooga; First Round	W 82–62	28–7	KFC Yum! Center (5,441); Louisville, KY
03/20/2017*; 6:30 pm, ESPN2	(4 O) No. 13	(5 O) Tennessee; Second Round	W 75–64	29–7	KFC Yum! Center (5,698); Louisville, KY
03/24/2017*; 9:00 pm, ESPN2	(4 O) No. 13	vs. (1 O) No. 5 Baylor; Sweet Sixteen	L 63–97	29–8	Chesapeake Energy Arena (3,499); Oklahoma City, OK
*Non-conference game. ^{#}Rankings from AP Poll. (#) Tournament seedings in parentheses. O=Oklahoma City Region. All times are in Eastern.

== Rankings ==
2016–17 NCAA Division I women's basketball rankings

Regular season polls
Poll	Pre- Season	Week 2	Week 3	Week 4	Week 5	Week 6	Week 7	Week 8	Week 9	Week 10	Week 11	Week 12	Week 13	Week 14	Week 15	Week 16	Week 17	Week 18	Week 19	Final
AP	5	5	4	7	8	8	8	8	8	9	9	9	9	12	14	14	13	13	13	N/A
Coaches	8	6	4	7	8	8	8	8	9	8	8	8	7	14	13	14	12	12	12	12

Legend
	Increase in ranking
	Decrease in ranking
	Not ranked previous week
(RV)	Received Votes

== See also ==
- 2016–17 Louisville Cardinals men's basketball team
