= 2019–20 Duke Blue Devils women's basketball team =

Intercollegiate basketball season

2019–20 Duke Blue Devils women's basketball
- Conference: Atlantic Coast Conference

Ranking
- Coaches: No. RV
- AP: No. RV
- Record: 18–12 (12–6 ACC)
- Head coach: Joanne P. McCallie (13th season)
- Assistant coaches: Sam Miller; Jim Corrigan; Wanisha Smith
- Home arena: Cameron Indoor Stadium

2019–20 ACC women's basketball standings
	Conf.				Overall
Team	W		L	PCT	W		L	PCT
No. 6 Louisville	16	–	2	.889	28	–	4	.875
No. 8 NC State†	14	–	4	.778	28	–	4	.875
Duke	12	–	6	.667	18	–	12	.600
No. 18 Florida State	11	–	7	.611	24	–	8	.750
Virginia Tech	11	–	7	.611	21	–	9	.700
Boston College	11	–	7	.611	20	–	12	.625
Georgia Tech	10	–	8	.556	20	–	11	.645
Syracuse	9	–	9	.500	16	–	15	.516
Virginia	8	–	10	.444	13	–	17	.433
Notre Dame	8	–	10	.444	13	–	18	.419
Miami (FL)	7	–	11	.389	15	–	15	.500
North Carolina	7	–	11	.389	16	–	14	.533
Wake Forest	7	–	11	.389	16	–	16	.500
Clemson	3	–	15	.167	8	–	23	.258
Pittsburgh	1	–	17	.056	5	–	26	.161
† 2020 ACC tournament winner As of March 5, 2020; Rankings from AP poll

The 2019–20 Duke Blue Devils women's basketball team represented Duke University during the 2019–20 NCAA Division I women's basketball season. Returning as head coach was Joanne P. McCallie in her 13th season. The team played its home games at Cameron Indoor Stadium in Durham, North Carolina as members of the Atlantic Coast Conference.

The Blue Devils finished the season 18–12 and 12–6 in ACC play to finish in third place. As the third seed in the ACC tournament, they lost to Boston College in the Quarterfinals. The NCAA tournament and WNIT were cancelled due to the COVID-19 outbreak.

== Previous season ==
The 2018-19 Blue Devils finished the season 15–15, 6–10 in ACC play to finish tied for tenth place in the regular season. They were the eleventh seed in the ACC women's tournament, where they won their first game against Pittsburgh and fell to Florida State in the Second Round. They did not receive an invitation to a post-season tournament.

== Off-season ==
=== Recruiting class ===
College recruiting
Name	Hometown	School	Height	Weight	Commit date
Jaida Patrick; G	West Haverstraw, NY	Saddle River Day School	6 ft 0 in (1.83 m)	N/A	
Jaida Patrick; G	Recruit ratings: ESPN: (95)				
Azana Baines; G	Blackwood, NJ	Gloucester Catholic High School	6 ft 1 in (1.85 m)	N/A	
Azana Baines; G	Recruit ratings: ESPN: (95)				
Jennifer Ezeh; F	Landover, MD	New Hope Academy	6 ft 2 in (1.88 m)	N/A	
Jennifer Ezeh; F	Recruit ratings: ESPN: (95)				
Jada Claude; F	Fayetteville, GA	Whitewater High School	6 ft 0 in (1.83 m)	N/A	
Jada Claude; F	Recruit ratings: ESPN: (89)				
Overall recruit ranking:
Note: In many cases, Scout, Rivals, 247Sports, On3, and ESPN may conflict in their listings of height and weight.; In these cases, the average was taken. ESPN grades are on a 100-point scale.; Sources:

== Roster ==
2019–20 Duke Blue Devils women's basketball team
Players
Coaches

Pos.	#	Name	Height	Year	Previous school	Hometown
G/F	0	Jaida Patrick	5 ft 10 in (1.78 m)	Fr	Saddle River Day	West Haverstraw, NY
G	2	Haley Gorecki	6 ft 0 in (1.83 m)	GS	William Fremd	Palatine, IL
G	3	Miela Goodchild	5 ft 10 in (1.78 m)	So	Moreton Bay College	Queensland, Australia
G/F	4	Jada Claude	6 ft 0 in (1.83 m)	Fr	Whitewater	Fayetteville, GA
F	5	Leaonna Odom	6 ft 2 in (1.88 m)	Sr	Chaminade	Lompoc, CA
G	11	Azana Baines	6 ft 1 in (1.85 m)	RS Fr	Gloucester Catholic	Blackwood, NJ
G	12	Mikayla Boykin	5 ft 9 in (1.75 m)	RS Fr	Clinton	Clinton, NC
C	13	Uchenna Nwoke	6 ft 6 in (1.98 m)	So	South Grand Prairie High School	Grand Prairie, TX
G	15	Kyra Lambert	5 ft 9 in (1.75 m)	GS	Samuel Clemens	Cibolo, TX
F	22	Jennifer Ezeh	6 ft 3 in (1.91 m)	Fr	New Hope Academy	Nibo, Nigeria
F/C	24	Onome Akinbode-James	6 ft 3 in (1.91 m)	So	Blair Academy	Blairstown, NJ
F/C	25	Jade Williams	6 ft 5 in (1.96 m)	Jr	Owensboro Catholic	Owensboro, KY
C	30	Emily Schubert	6 ft 4 in (1.93 m)	RS Sr	Elizabethton	Elizabethton, TN
G	32	Jayda Adams	6 ft 0 in (1.83 m)	Jr	Mater Dei	Irvine, CA

Head coach

- Joanne P. McCallie (Northwestern)

Assistant coach(es)

- Sam Miller (Adrian)
- Jim Corrigan (Duke)
- Wanisha Smith (Duke)

Legend

- (C) Team captain
- (S) Suspended
- (I) Ineligible
- (W) Walk-on
- Injured
- Current redshirt

Roster
Last update: November 8, 2019

== Rankings ==
2019–20 NCAA Division I women's basketball rankings

Regular season polls
Poll	Pre- Season	Week 2	Week 3	Week 4	Week 5	Week 6	Week 7	Week 8	Week 9	Week 10	Week 11	Week 12	Week 13	Week 14	Week 15	Week 16	Week 17	Week 18	Week 19	Final
AP	RV																RV	RV	RV	RV
Coaches																RV	RV	RV	RV	N/A;"

Legend
	Increase in ranking
	Decrease in ranking
	No change
(RV)	Received votes
(NR)	Not ranked

Coaches did not release a Week 2 poll and AP does not release a final poll. Due to the cancellation of the NCAA Tournament, the coaches poll did not release a final ranking.

== Schedule ==
Date time, TV	Rank^{#}	Opponent^{#}	Result	Record	High points	High rebounds	High assists	Site (attendance) city, state
Exhibition
November 3, 2019*; 2:00 p.m.		Alaska Anchorage	W 91–59	–	19 – Tied	15 – Gorecki	4 – Tied	Cameron Indoor Stadium; Durham, NC
Regular season
November 5, 2019*; 7:00 p.m., ACCNX		High Point	W 93–57	1–0	19 – Odom	8 – Baines	5 – Goodchild	Cameron Indoor Stadium (2,662); Durham, NC
November 10, 2019*; 4:00 p.m., SECN+		at No. 6 Texas A&M	L 58–79	1–1	16 – Gorecki	5 – Baines	2 – Tied	Reed Arena (3,289); College Station, TX
November 14, 2019*; 8:30 p.m., MWN		at UNLV	W 57–45	2–1	15 – Gorecki	8 – Goodchild	4 – Gorecki	Thomas & Mack Center (1,001); Las Vegas, NV
November 17, 2019*; 3:00 p.m., ACCN		Northwestern	L 42–63	2–2	11 – Williams	9 – Gorecki	7 – Odom	Cameron Indoor Stadium (4,118); Durham, NC
November 21, 2019*; 7:00 p.m., ACCNX		Idaho State	W 85–66	3–2	30 – Gorecki	7 – Tied	4 – Tied	Cameron Indoor Stadium (2,718); Durham, NC
November 24, 2019*; 2:00 p.m., ACCNX		Troy	W 99–85	4–2	26 – Goodchild	13 – Gorecki	5 – Gorecki	Cameron Indoor Stadium (2,833); Durham, NC
November 27, 2019*; 7:00 p.m., ACCNX		Davidson	W 82–52	5–2	25 – Gorecki	12 – Akinbode-James	4 – Gorecki	Cameron Indoor Stadium (2,784); Durham, NC
November 29, 2019*; 1:00 p.m., ACCNX		Penn	W 66–50	6–2	23 – Odom	16 – Odom	10 – Gorecki	Cameron Indoor Stadium (2,809); Durham, NC
December 4, 2019*; 7:00 p.m., Big Ten Network		at Nebraska; ACC–Big Ten Women's Challenge	L 79–83	6–3	20 – Odom	7 – Tied	4 – Gorecki	Pinnacle Bank Arena (4,013); Lincoln, NE
December 8, 2019; 2:00 p.m., ACCNX		Boston College	W 85–73	7–3 (1–0)	27 – Gorecki	14 – Odom	7 – Gorecki	Cameron Indoor Stadium (3,005); Durham, NC
December 19, 2019*; 2:00 p.m., ACCNX		at No. 5 South Carolina	L 46–89	7–4	11 – Goodchild	6 – Lambert	3 – Akinbode-James	Colonial Life Arena (11,024); Columbia, SC
December 29, 2019*; 2:00 p.m., ESPN+		at Florida Gulf Coast	L 56–78	7–5	19 – Gorecki	10 – Gorecki	2 – Tied	Alico Arena (3,267); Fort Myers, FL
January 2, 2020; 6:00 p.m., ACCNX		Wake Forest	L 58–60	7–6 (1–1)	17 – Gorecki	7 – Williams	2 – 3 tied	Cameron Indoor Stadium (3,416); Durham, NC
January 5, 2020; 2:00 p.m., ACCN		at No. 7 Louisville	L 55–60	7–7 (1–2)	20 – Gorecki	7 – Baines	5 – Gorecki	KFC Yum! Center (10,123); Louisville, KY
January 9, 2020; 6:00 p.m., ACCN		at Virginia	L 63–66	7–8 (1–3)	27 – Gorecki	7 – Akinbode-James	5 – Gorecki	John Paul Jones Arena (2,206); Charlottesville, VA
January 12, 2020; 3:00 p.m., RSN		Virginia Tech	W 72–67 ^{OT}	8–8 (2–3)	17 – Gorecki	12 – Gorecki	3 – Tied	Cameron Indoor Stadium (3,088); Durham, NC
January 16, 2020; 8:00 p.m., ACCN		Notre Dame	W 50–47	9–8 (3–3)	13 – Tied	9 – Gorecki	2 – 3 tied	Cameron Indoor Stadium (3,022); Durham, NC
January 19, 2020; 12:00 p.m., ESPNU		at Clemson	L 58–62	9–9 (3–4)	20 – Odom	7 – Gorecki	7 – Gorecki	Littlejohn Coliseum (1,718); Clemson, SC
January 23, 2020; 8:00 p.m., ACCN		at Syracuse	W 88–58	10–9 (4–4)	23 – Odom	10 – Odom	9 – Gorecki	Carrier Dome (2,106); Syracuse, NY
January 26, 2020; 2:00 p.m., ACCNX		Georgia Tech	W 58–46	11–9 (5–4)	18 – Gorecki	10 – Akinbode-James	3 – Tied	Cameron Indoor Stadium (3,451); Durham, NC
February 2, 2020; 2:00 p.m., ACCNX		No. 7 NC State	L 60–63	11–10 (5–5)	21 – Gorecki	7 – Gorecki	3 – Gorecki	Cameron Indoor Stadium (4,209); Durham, NC
February 6, 2020; 6:00 p.m., ACCN		North Carolina; Rivalry	W 71–61	12–10 (6–5)	25 – Gorecki	12 – Gorecki	8 – Gorecki	Cameron Indoor Stadium (5,686); Durham, NC
February 9, 2020; 2:00 p.m., ACCNX		at Miami (FL)	W 74–55	13–10 (7–5)	16 – Williams	10 – Gorecki	7 – Gorecki	Watsco Center (1,435); Coral Gables, FL
February 13, 2020; 6:00 p.m., ACCN		at Pittsburgh	W 73–56	14–10 (8–5)	20 – Odom	9 – Akinbode-James	7 – Gorecki	Petersen Events Center (876); Pittsburgh, PA
February 16, 2020; 1:00 p.m., ACCN		No. 14 Florida State	W 66–64	15–10 (9–5)	21 – Gorecki	7 – Akinbode-James	4 – Williams	Cameron Indoor Stadium (4,303); Durham, NC
February 20, 2020; 7:00 p.m., ACCNX		Virginia	W 62–47	16–10 (10–5)	17 – Odom	12 – Odom	5 – Boykin	Cameron Indoor Stadium (3,154); Durham, NC
February 24, 2020; 7:00 p.m., ESPN2		at No. 8 NC State	W 70–65	17–10 (11–5)	24 – Gorecki	7 – Odom	5 – Gorecki	Reynolds Coliseum (5,580); Raleigh, NC
February 27, 2020; 7:00 p.m., ACCNX		at Virginia Tech	L 56–70	17–11 (11–6)	16 – Odom	7 – Odom	5 – Gorecki	Cassell Coliseum (1,603); Blacksburg, VA
March 1, 2020; 2:00 p.m., ESPN2		North Carolina; Rivalry	W 73–54	18–11 (12–6)	23 – Gorecki	10 – Williams	5 – Gorecki	Cameron Indoor Stadium (4,916); Durham, NC
ACC Women's Tournament
March 6, 2020; 8:00 p.m., RSN	(3)	vs. (6) Boston College; Quarterfinals	L 77–84	18–12	25 – Gorecki	10 – Gorecki	5 – 3 tied	Greensboro Coliseum (5,492); Greensboro, NC
*Non-conference game. ^{#}Rankings from AP Poll,. (#) Tournament seedings in parentheses. All times are in Eastern Time.

== See also ==
- 2019–20 Duke Blue Devils men's basketball team
