= Otto Brown =

American football player (1947–2006)

No. 31, 21, 22, 32
- Position: Safety

Personal information
- Born: January 12, 1947; Tallahassee, Florida, U.S.
- Died: December 5, 2006 (aged 59); Dallas, Texas, U.S.
- Listed height: 6 ft 1 in (1.85 m)
- Listed weight: 188 lb (85 kg)

Career information
- High school: Tallahassee (FL) FAMU Developmental Research
- College: Prairie View A&M (1965–1968)
- NFL draft: 1969: undrafted

Career history
- Dallas Cowboys (1969); New York Giants (1970–1973); The Hawaiians (1974)

Career NFL statistics
- Interceptions: 2
- Fumble recoveries: 1
- Sacks: 2
- Stats at Pro Football Reference

Otto Brown (January 12, 1947 – December 5, 2006) was an American professional football safety in the National Football League for the Dallas Cowboys and New York Giants. He played college football at Prairie View A&M University.

== Early life ==
Brown attended Florida A&M University Developmental Research School, where he practiced football and baseball. He accepted a football scholarship from Prairie View A&M University under head coach Hoover J. Wright.

He played as a running back, before being converted into a cornerback. He also was a punt return specialist. He received the Thomas Burton Award for the school's athlete having the highest grade average in science.

He missed his senior season, after being dismissed from Prairie View A&M following an incident of burned campus buildings, in response to the killing of halfback Wesley Davidson. In 1970, he filed a suit against the school arguing the violation of his civil rights.

== Professional career ==
=== Dallas Cowboys ===
Brown was signed as an undrafted free agent by the Dallas Cowboys after the 1969 NFL/AFL draft. As a rookie, he played mostly on special teams. He started in the last game and the playoffs over Phil Clark at right cornerback. In 1970, he was tried at strong safety before being released on September 10.

=== New York Giants ===
In September 1970, he was signed by the New York Giants to their taxi squad. On September 23, he was activated after Scott Eaton suffered a knee injury. In 1971, he started 8 games at left cornerback. In 1971, he appeared in 13 games (one start) and had one interception. In 1973, he was initially waived on September 4 and later re-signed.

=== The Hawaiians ===
In 1974, he signed a contract with The Hawaiians of the World Football League. He was a starter at cornerback and played in 20 games, while making 3 interceptions.
