= Kylee Shook =

American basketball player (born 1998)

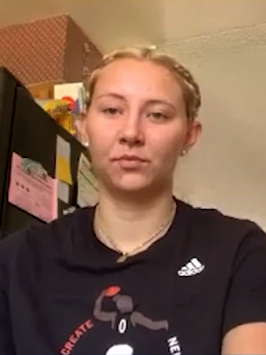
- Shook in 2020

Personal information
- Born: March 18, 1998 (age 28) Fort Carson, Colorado, U.S.
- Listed height: 6 ft 5 in (1.96 m)
- Listed weight: 200 lb (91 kg)

Career information
- High school: Mesa Ridge (Colorado Springs, Colorado)
- College: Louisville (2016–2020)
- WNBA draft: 2020: 2nd round, 13th overall pick
- Drafted by: New York Liberty
- Playing career: 2020–present
- Position: Center
- Number: 26

Career history
- 2020–2022: New York Liberty

Career highlights
- ACC Defensive Player of the Year (2020); ACC All-Defensive Team (2020); First-team All-ACC (2020); McDonald's All-American (2016)
- Stats at Basketball Reference

Kylee Annette Shook (born March 18, 1998) is an American professional basketball player. She played college basketball for the Louisville Cardinals.

== College career ==
Shook played college basketball for the Louisville Cardinals from 2016 to 2020, in her freshman season, she averaged 5.2 points, 3.3 rebounds and 0.5 assists per game. In her sophomore season, she averaged 4.9 points, 3.6 rebounds and 0.5 assists per game. In her junior year, she averaged 7.1 points, 6 rebounds and 0.7 assists per game. In her senior year, she averaged 10.1 points, 8.1 rebounds and 1 assist per game. Shook finished her Louisville career as the program's all-time leader in blocked shots, with 223. She was named the ACC Defensive Player of the Year, and also earned All-ACC First Team and All-ACC Defensive Team honors.

== Professional career ==
On April 17, 2020, the New York Liberty selected Shook as the 13th pick in the 2020 WNBA draft.

== Career statistics ==
=== WNBA career statistics ===
Legend
GP	Games played	GS	Games started	MPG	Minutes per game	RPG	Rebounds per game
APG	Assists per game	SPG	Steals per game	BPG	Blocks per game	PPG	Points per game
TO	Turnovers per game	FG%	Field-goal percentage	3P%	3-point field-goal percentage	FT%	Free-throw percentage
**Bold**	Career best	°	League leader

==== Regular season ====
Year	Team	GP	GS	MPG	FG%	3P%	FT%	RPG	APG	SPG	BPG	TO	PPG
2020	New York	20	0	14.5	.405	.176	**.824**	2.8	0.6	**0.4**	**0.5**	1.0	4.1
2021	New York	**30**	**19**	**18.9**	**.467**	**.393**	.800	**4.0**	**1.4**	0.3	**0.5**	1.3	**5.7**
Career	2 years, 1 team	50	19	17.1	.446	.346	.818	3.5	1.0	0.3	0.5	1.2	5.0

=== College ===
Year	Team	GP	GS	MPG	FG%	3P%	FT%	RPG	APG	SPG	BPG	TO	PPG
2016–17	Louisville	35	13	13.3	47.3	38.8	66.7	3.3	0.5	0.2	1.0	0.8	5.2
2017–18	Louisville	**39**	1	13.9	45.9	38.2	68.4	3.6	0.5	0.4	1.3	0.8	4.9
2018–19	Louisville	35	3	19.4	**51.0**	**39.6**	71.4	6.0	0.7	0.6	1.5	**0.7**	7.1
2019–20	Louisville	32	28	**26.7**	46.3	36.8	**76.3**	**8.1**	**1.0**	**1.0**	**2.7**	1.0	**10.1**
**Career**		141	45	18.0	47.6	38.2	72.3	5.1	0.7	0.5	1.6	0.8	6.7
Statistics retrieved from Sports-Reference.

== Personal life ==
Shook is the daughter of Kristine and US Army veteran Gerald Shook, and also has a brother.
