= Jeff Walz =

American basketball player-coach

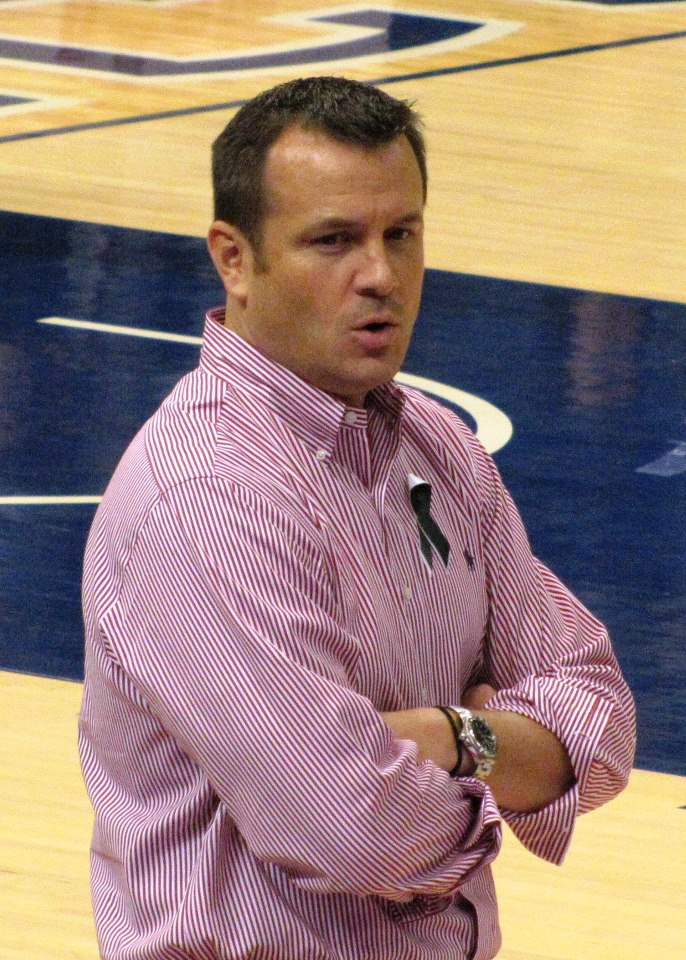

Current position
- Title: Head coach
- Team: Louisville
- Conference: ACC
- Record: 515–154 (.770)

Biographical details
- Born: October 27, 1971 (age 54); Fort Thomas, Kentucky, U.S.

Coaching career (HC unless noted)
- 1996–1997: Western Kentucky (asst.)
- 1997–2001: Nebraska (asst.)
- 2001–2002: Minnesota (asst.)
- 2002–2007: Maryland (asst.)
- 2007–present: Louisville

Head coaching record
- Overall: 515–154 (.770)

Accomplishments and honors

Championships
- NCAA Women's Division I Basketball Championship (2006) (asst); 4× NCAA Regional—Final Four (2009, 2013, 2018, 2022); ACC tournament (2018); 4× ACC regular season (2018, 2019, 2020, 2021)

Jeffrey Jacob Walz (born October 27, 1971) is the head coach of the women's basketball team at the University of Louisville. In his second year as a head coach, he guided his team to a national championship appearance at the 2009 NCAA Division I women's basketball tournament, and led the Cardinals to a second championship game appearance in 2013.

== High school ==
Walz attended Highlands High School in Fort Thomas, Kentucky.

== College ==
Walz completed his undergraduate studies at Northern Kentucky, attending on a basketball scholarship. He graduated in 1995, earning a Bachelor of Science in secondary education, and went on to complete a master's degree at Western Kentucky in 1997 while serving as a women's basketball graduate assistant coach under Paul Sanderford.

== Coaching ==
Walz began coaching middle school and high school teams before finishing college. His first college position was assistant to Paul Sanderford at Western Kentucky, where he coached his sister Jaime Walz, who earned Kentucky "Miss Basketball" honors in 1996.

When Sanderford moved to take the head coach position at the University of Nebraska–Lincoln, Walz followed him as an assistant. While at Nebraska, he helped the program go to a school record three consecutive NCAA appearances.

In 2002, Walz accepted a position as assistant to Brenda Frese (then Brenda Oldfield) at Minnesota. Frese won AP Coach of the Year honors after improving Minnesota from 8–20 to 22–8. The University of Maryland persuaded her to accept the head coaching position and Walz also made the move. He spent five seasons at Maryland, helping them to become a national power, including a national championship at the 2006 NCAA Division I women's basketball tournament.

Walz made the transition to head coach in 2007, accepting an offer from the University of Louisville. The school moved into the top 15 in attendance in his first year, averaging 6,456 fans per game, and attracting a total of 77,480 people that season.

When the women's team (along with the U of L men's team) moved to the KFC Yum! Center in 2010, attendance took another major jump. In both of the first two seasons that the Cardinals women spent at the KFC Yum! Center (2010–11 and 2011–12), the team ranked second in national attendance behind Tennessee.

Walz received a pay increase from his athletic director Tom Jurich, prior to the 2012–13 season.

Walz took the 2012–13 team to the national championship game, falling to UConn 93–60.

== Awards and honors ==
- 2008—Maggie Dixon Award

== Head coaching record ==
Record table
Season	Team	Overall	Conference	Standing	Postseason
Louisville Cardinals (Big East) (2007–2013)
2007–08	Louisville	26–10	10–6	T-5th	NCAA Sweet Sixteen
2008–09	Louisville	34–5	14–2	2nd	NCAA Runner-Up
2009–10	Louisville	14–18	5–11	T-12th	WBI First Round
2010–11	Louisville	22–13	10–6	T-5th	NCAA Sweet Sixteen
2011–12	Louisville	23–10	10–6	T-6th	NCAA Second Round
2012–13	Louisville	29–9	11–5	T-3rd	NCAA Runner-Up
Louisville Cardinals (The American) (2013–2014)
2013–14	Louisville	33–5	16–2	2nd	NCAA Elite Eight
Louisville Cardinals (ACC) (2014–present)
2014–15	Louisville	27–7	12–4	3rd	NCAA Sweet Sixteen
2015–16	Louisville	26–8	15–1	2nd	NCAA Second Round
2016–17	Louisville	29–8	12–4	T-4th	NCAA Sweet Sixteen
2017–18	Louisville	36–3	15–1	T-1st	NCAA Final Four
2018–19	Louisville	32–4	14–2	T-1st	NCAA Elite Eight
2019–20	Louisville	28–4	16–2	1st	Tournament Cancelled
2020–21	Louisville	26–4	14–2	1st	NCAA Elite Eight
2021–22	Louisville	29–5	16–2	2nd	NCAA Final Four
2022–23	Louisville	26–12	12–6	T-4th	NCAA Elite Eight
2023–24	Louisville	24–10	12–6	T-5th	NCAA First Round
2024–25	Louisville	22–11	13–5	T-4th	NCAA Second Round
2025–26	Louisville	29–8	15–3	2nd	NCAA Sweet Sixteen
2026–27	Louisville	0–0	0–0		
Louisville:		515–154 (.770)	242–76 (.761)		
Total:		515–154 (.770)			
National champion Postseason invitational champion Conference regular season champion Conference regular season and conference tournament champion Division regular season champion Division regular season and conference tournament champion Conference tournament champion
