= Jazmine Jones =

American basketball player (born 1996)

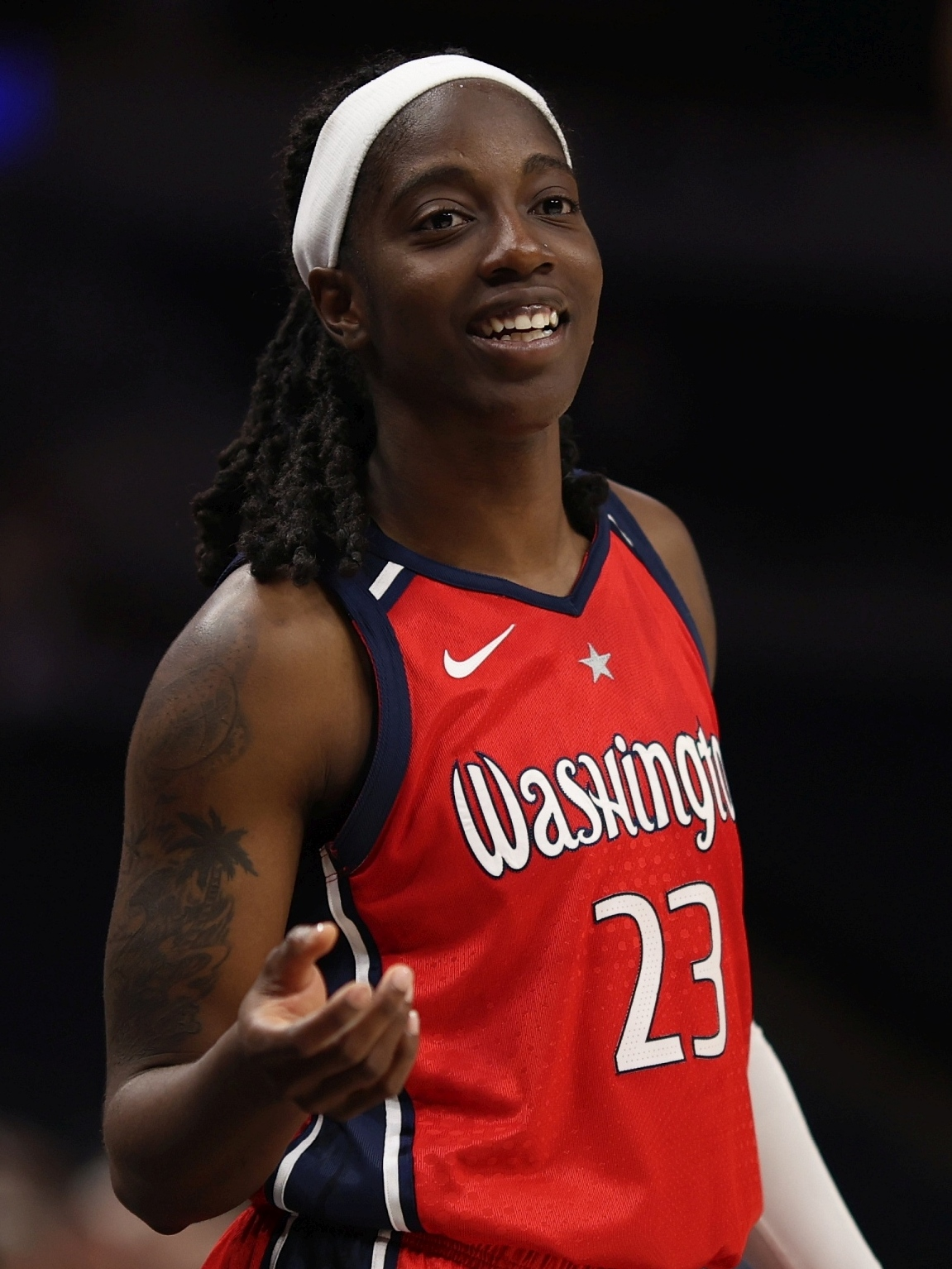
- Jones with the Washington Mystics in 2023

No. 23 – Free agent
- Position: Small forward / shooting guard

Personal information
- Born: October 15, 1996 (age 30) Tallahassee, Florida, U.S.
- Listed height: 6 ft 0 in (1.83 m)
- Listed weight: 160 lb (73 kg)

Career information
- High school: Florida A&M Developmental (Tallahassee, Florida)
- College: Louisville (2016–2020)
- WNBA draft: 2020: 1st round, 12th overall pick
- Drafted by: New York Liberty
- Playing career: 2020–present

Career history
- 2020–2021: New York Liberty
- 2021–2022: Tarbes Gespe Bigorre
- 2022: New York Liberty
- 2022: Hatayspor
- 2022–2023: Ramat Hasharon
- 2023: Washington Mystics
- 2023–2024: Panathinaikos

Career highlights
- WNBA All-Rookie Team (2020); First-team All-ACC (2020); ACC All-Defensive Team (2020)
- Stats at Basketball Reference

Jazmine Jones (born October 15, 1996) is an American basketball player who last played for Panathinaikos of the Greek League. She played college basketball for the Louisville Cardinals of the Atlantic Coast Conference. She was drafted by the New York Liberty in the 2020 WNBA draft.

== High school career ==
Jones received a scholarship offer from Florida State in eighth grade. She attended Florida A&M University Developmental Research School and was coached by Ericka Cromartie. She was a two-time Florida state champion and was the 2016 Florida Gatorade Player of the Year. Jones finished her career with more than 2,000 points, 1,000 rebounds, 500 assists, and 500 steals. She committed to Louisville in her senior year.

== College career ==
Jones played in a program-record 144 games at Louisville and contributed to a school-record 125 wins. She averaged 4.5 points and 2.6 rebounds per game as a freshman. Jones averaged 8.9 points per game as a sophomore and 7.6 points per game as a junior. As a senior, she averaged 14.1 points, 5.0 rebounds, 3.4 assists and 1.5 steals per game. She was selected to the All-ACC First Team, All-ACC Defensive Team and ACC All-Tournament Team and was also named a WBCA All-American honorable mention.

== Professional career ==
Jones was selected with the 12th pick of the 2020 WNBA draft by the New York Liberty. She has also signed with the French team Tarbes Gespe Bigorre.

In her rookie season, Jones played 20 games and averaged 10.8 points, 4.1 rebounds and 2.3 assists. In the sophomore season, she played 27 games but had a drop in minutes (going from 21.4 to 16.6) and a drop in points, rebounds and assists (down to 5.9, 2.4 and 1.1 assists respectively).

On February 4, 2022, the Liberty waived Jones. She was claimed off waivers a few days later by the Indiana Fever but was waived on May 1, 2022. A month into the 2022 season on June 15, she was signed by the Connecticut Sun and played that day, recording 1 point and 1 assist in 11 minutes against the Atlanta Dream (winning the game 105 - 92). She was waived 9 days later on June 24. Two days later on June 26, she would sign the first of three 7-day contracts with the Sun and played 5 more games for them between June 26 and July 19.

The Washington Mystics signed Jones on August 10, 2022, and she played one game for the team on August 14, recording 1 rebound and no other stats in 3 minutes of playing time. She finished the season with the team and signed to their training camp roster for the 2023 season on January 23, 2023.

== Career statistics ==
Legend
GP	Games played	GS	Games started	MPG	Minutes per game	RPG	Rebounds per game
APG	Assists per game	SPG	Steals per game	BPG	Blocks per game	PPG	Points per game
TO	Turnovers per game	FG%	Field-goal percentage	3P%	3-point field-goal percentage	FT%	Free-throw percentage
**Bold**	Career best	°	League leader

=== WNBA ===
==== Regular season ====
Year	Team	GP	GS	MPG	FG%	3P%	FT%	RPG	APG	SPG	BPG	TO	PPG
2020	New York	20	**2**	**21.4**	**.404**	.333	**.788**	**4.1**	**2.3**	**1.4**	**0.5**	2.9	**10.8**
2021	New York	**27**	0	16.6	.356	**.383**	.761	2.4	1.1	0.5	0.4	1.6	5.9
2022	Connecticut	7	0	6.3	.286	.000	.400	0.1	0.1	0.3	0.0	**0.4**	0.9
2022	Washington	1	0	3.0	.000	.000	.000	1.0	0.0	0.0	0.0	0.0	0.0
Career	3 years, 3 teams	55	2	16.8	.378	.347	.763	2.7	1.4	0.8	0.3	1.9	6.9

==== Postseason ====
Year	Team	GP	GS	MPG	FG%	3P%	FT%	RPG	APG	SPG	BPG	TO	PPG
2021	New York	1	0	3.0	.000	.000	.000	0.0	0.0	0.0	0.0	0.0	0.0
Career	1 year, 1 team	1	0	3.0	.000	.000	.000	0.0	0.0	0.0	0.0	0.0	0.0

Legend
GP	Games played	GS	Games started	MPG	Minutes per game	RPG	Rebounds per game
APG	Assists per game	SPG	Steals per game	BPG	Blocks per game	PPG	Points per game
TO	Turnovers per game	FG%	Field-goal percentage	3P%	3-point field-goal percentage	FT%	Free-throw percentage
**Bold**	Career best	°	League leader

=== College ===
Year	Team	GP	GS	MPG	FG%	3P%	FT%	RPG	APG	SPG	BPG	TO	PPG
2016–17	Louisville	37	1	15.1	46.6	0.0	65.9	2.6	1.0	0.7	0.1	**1.2**	4.5
2017–18	Louisville	**39**	**39**	26.8	52.5	22.2	73.2	4.6	2.3	**1.5**	0.2	2.0	8.9
2018–19	Louisville	36	36	23.3	52.0	26.9	64.4	4.6	2.5	1.1	**0.5**	1.6	7.6
2019–20	Louisville	32	31	**29.5**	**53.9**	**37.8**	**76.3**	**5.0**	**3.4**	**1.5**	0.3	2.3	**14.1**
**Career**		144	107	23.5	52.0	31.3	71.4	4.2	2.3	1.2	0.3	1.7	8.6
Statistics retrieved from Sports-Reference.

== Club honors ==
=== Panathinaikos ===
- 1× Greek Cup Winner: 2024

== Personal life ==
Jones is the daughter of Reginald and Felicia Jones. Her father played football at Florida A&M. Her brother Reginald Jr. played football at Florida International University while sister GiGi played basketball at Appalachian State and Jacksonville.
