= 2018–19 Louisville Cardinals women's basketball team =

Intercollegiate basketball season

2018–19 Louisville Cardinals women's basketball

ACC regular season co-champions

NCAA tournament, Elite Eight
- Conference: Atlantic Coast Conference

Ranking
- Coaches: No. 6
- AP: No. 5
- Record: 32–4 (14–2 ACC)
- Head coach: Jeff Walz (12th season)
- Assistant coaches: Stephanie Norman; Samantha Williams; Sam Purcell
- Home arena: KFC Yum! Center

2018–19 ACC women's basketball standings
	Conf.				Overall
Team	W		L	PCT	W		L	PCT
No. 3 Notre Dame†	14	–	2	.875	35	–	4	.897
No. 5 Louisville	14	–	2	.875	32	–	4	.889
No. 10 NC State	12	–	4	.750	28	–	6	.824
No. 19 Miami (FL)	12	–	4	.750	25	–	9	.735
No. 12 Syracuse	11	–	5	.688	25	–	9	.735
No. 25 Florida State	10	–	6	.625	24	–	9	.727
Clemson	9	–	7	.563	20	–	13	.606
North Carolina	8	–	8	.500	18	–	15	.545
Georgia Tech	7	–	9	.438	17	–	13	.567
Virginia Tech	6	–	10	.375	22	–	12	.647
Duke	6	–	10	.375	15	–	15	.500
Virginia	5	–	11	.313	12	–	19	.387
Boston College	3	–	13	.188	14	–	16	.467
Pittsburgh	2	–	14	.125	11	–	20	.355
Wake Forest	1	–	15	.063	10	–	20	.333
† 2019 ACC tournament winner As of March 7, 2019; Rankings from AP poll

The 2018–19 Louisville Cardinals women's basketball team represented the University of Louisville during the 2018–19 NCAA Division I women's basketball season. The Cardinals, led by 12th-year head coach Jeff Walz, played their home games at the KFC Yum! Center in their fifth year in the Atlantic Coast Conference. They finished the season 32–4, 14–2 in ACC play to win a share of the regular season title. They advanced to the championship game of the ACC women's tournament where they lost to Notre Dame. They received the at-large bid to the NCAA women's tournament as a No. 1 seed in the Albany region where they defeated Robert Morris and Michigan in the first and second rounds, Oregon State in the sweet sixteen before losing to Connecticut in the elite eight.

== Previous season ==
The Cardinals finished the 2017–18 season at 36–3, 15–1 in ACC play to finish in a tie for first place. They won the ACC women's tournament. They received an automatic bid for the NCAA women's tournament as a number one seed. In the tournament, they advanced to the Final Four where they lost to Mississippi State.

== Off-season ==
=== Recruiting class ===
College recruiting
Name	Hometown	School	Height	Weight	Commit date
Mykasa Robinson; G	Ashland, KY	Ashland Blazer	5 ft 7 in (1.70 m)	N/A	
Mykasa Robinson; G	Recruit ratings: ESPN: (97)				
Seygan Robins; G	Harrodsburg, KY	Mercer County	5 ft 10 in (1.78 m)	N/A	
Seygan Robins; G	Recruit ratings: ESPN: (97)				
Molly Lockhart; F	Louisville, KY	Butler	6 ft 1 in (1.85 m)	N/A	
Molly Lockhart; F	Recruit ratings: ESPN: (90)				
Overall recruit ranking:
Note: In many cases, Scout, Rivals, 247Sports, On3, and ESPN may conflict in their listings of height and weight.; In these cases, the average was taken. ESPN grades are on a 100-point scale.; Sources:

== Roster ==
2017–18 Louisville Cardinals women's basketball team
Players
Coaches

Pos.	#	Name	Height	Year	Previous school	Hometown
G	1	Dana Evans	5 ft 6 in (1.68 m)	So	West Side Leadership Academy	Gary, IN
G	2	Yacine Diop (injured)	5 ft 10 in (1.78 m)	RS Sr	Seton-La Salle; Pittsburgh	Dakar, Senegal
F	3	Sam Fuehring	6 ft 3 in (1.91 m)	Sr	Immaculate Conception	Wanaque, NJ
G	4	Seygan Robins	5 ft 10 in (1.78 m)	Fr	Mercer County	Harrodsburg, KY
G	5	Mykasa Robinson	5 ft 7 in (1.7 m)	Fr	Ashland Blazer	Ashland, KY
G	11	Arica Carter	5 ft 8 in (1.73 m)	RS Sr	Lloyd C. Bird	Long Beach, CA
G	12	Lindsey Duvall	5 ft 9 in (1.75 m)	RS Fr	Bullitt East	Mount Washington, KY
F	21	Kylee Shook	6 ft 4 in (1.93 m)	Jr	Mesa Ridge	Colorado Springs, CO
G	23	Jazmine Jones	6 ft 0 in (1.83 m)	Jr	Florida A&M Developmental	Tallahassee, FL
G	24	Jessica Laemmle	5 ft 2 in (1.57 m)	Jr	Mercy Academy	Louisville, KY
G	25	Asia Durr	5 ft 10 in (1.78 m)	Sr	St. Pius X Catholic	Douglasville, GA
F	30	Molly Lockhart	6 ft 1 in (1.85 m)	Fr	Butler	Louisville, KY
F	33	Bionca Dunham	6 ft 2 in (1.88 m)	Jr	Imhotep Institute Charter	Philadelphia, PA

Head coach

- Jeff Walz (Northern Kentucky)

Assistant coach(es)

- Stephanie Norman (Arizona State)
- Samantha Williams (Auburn)
- Sam Purcell (Auburn)

Legend

- (C) Team captain
- (S) Suspended
- (I) Ineligible
- (W) Walk-on
- Injured
- Current redshirt

Roster
Last update: October 18, 2018

== Rankings ==
Regular season ranking movement Legend: ██ Increase in ranking. ██ Decrease in ranking. ██ Not ranked the previous week. RV=Received votes.
Poll	Pre- Season	Week 2	Week 3	Week 4	Week 5	Week 6	Week 7	Week 8	Week 9	Week 10	Week 11	Week 12	Week 13	Week 14	Week 15	Week 16	Week 17	Week 18	Week 19	Final
AP	5	5	5	5	5	4	3	3	3	2 (10)	4	4	3 (2)	2 (3)	2 (3)	4	3	3	5	N/A
Coaches	4	4	4	4	4	3	3	3	3	2 (9)	4	4	3	2 (3)	2 (2)	4-T	3	3	5	6

Coaches did not release a Week 2 poll and AP does not release a final poll.

== Schedule and results ==
Date time, TV	Rank^{#}	Opponent^{#}	Result	Record	Site (attendance) city, state
Regular season
November 6, 2018*; 7:00 pm	No. 5	at Western Kentucky	W 102–80	1–0	E. A. Diddle Arena (3,476); Bowling Green, KY
November 9, 2018*; 7:00 pm	No. 5	at Chattanooga	W 75–49	2–0	McKenzie Arena (1,147); Chattanooga, TN
November 19, 2018*; 9:00 pm	No. 5	at Boise State	W 74–55	3–0	Taco Bell Arena (4,125); Boise, ID
November 23, 2018*; 5:30 pm	No. 5	vs. No. 19 Arizona State; South Point Thanksgiving Shootout	W 58–56	4–0	South Point Arena (1,276); Enterprise, NV
November 24, 2018*; 3:00 pm	No. 5	vs. Hartford; South Point Thanksgiving Shootout	W 86–69	5–0	South Point Arena (989); Enterprise, NV
November 26, 2018*; 7:00 pm	No. 5	Miami (OH)	W 95–73	6–0	KFC Yum! Center (7,544); Louisville, KY
November 29, 2018*; 7:00 pm	No. 5	Nebraska; ACC–Big Ten Women's Challenge	W 85–68	7–0	KFC Yum! Center (7,363); Louisville, KY
December 2, 2018*; 2:00 pm	No. 5	Tennessee State	W 107–52	8–0	KFC Yum! Center (7,762); Louisville, KY
December 4, 2018*; 7:00 pm	No. 5	UT Martin	W 102–62	9–0	KFC Yum! Center (7,004); Louisville, KY
December 9, 2018*; 2:00 pm, ACCN Extra	No. 5	No. 19 Kentucky; Battle for the Bluegrass	W 80–75	10–0	KFC Yum! Center (13,786); Louisville, KY
December 15, 2018*; 11:30 am	No. 4	Northern Kentucky	W 92–59	11–0	KFC Yum! Center (7,781); Louisville, KY
December 20, 2018*; 7:00 pm	No. 3	at Central Michigan	W 72–68	12–0	McGuirk Arena (2,833); Mount Pleasant, MI
January 3, 2019; 7:00 pm, ACCN Extra	No. 3	North Carolina	W 73–66	13–0 (1–0)	KFC Yum! Center (8,506); Louisville, KY
January 6, 2019; 2:00 pm, ACCN Extra	No. 3	at Duke	W 73–51	14–0 (2–0)	Cameron Indoor Stadium (4,148); Durham, NC
January 10, 2019; 7:00 pm, ESPN	No. 2	at No. 1 Notre Dame	L 68–82	14–1 (2–1)	Edmund P. Joyce Center (9,149); Notre Dame, IN
January 13, 2019; 2:00 pm, ACCN Extra	No. 2	Georgia Tech	W 61–44	15–1 (3–1)	KFC Yum! Center (10,514); Louisville, KY
January 17, 2019; 7:00 pm, ACCN Extra	No. 4	Virginia	W 91–43	16–1 (4–1)	KFC Yum! Center (7,834); Louisville, KY
January 20, 2019; 1:00 pm, ACCN Extra	No. 4	at Wake Forest	W 73–49	17–1 (5–1)	LJVM Coliseum (1,193); Winston-Salem, NC
January 24, 2019; 7:00 pm, RSN	No. 4	at No. 22 Florida State	W 68–49	18–1 (6–1)	Donald L. Tucker Center (3,446); Tallahassee, FL
January 27, 2019; 2:00 pm, ACCN Extra	No. 4	Pittsburgh	W 70–42	19–1 (7–1)	KFC Yum! Center (10,067); Louisville, KY
January 31, 2019*; 7:00 pm, ESPN	No. 3	No. 2 Connecticut	W 78–69	20–1	KFC Yum! Center (17,023); Louisville, KY
February 2, 2019; 2:00 pm, ACCN Extra	No. 3	at Clemson	W 76–44	21–1 (8–1)	Littlejohn Coliseum (1,537); Clemson, SC
February 7, 2019; 7:00 pm, ACCN Extra	No. 2	No. 15 Syracuse	W 76–51	22–1 (9–1)	KFC Yum! Center (8,521); Louisville, KY
February 10, 2019; 12:00 pm, RSN	No. 2	at Virginia Tech	W 72–63	23–1 (10–1)	Cassell Coliseum (2,006); Blacksburg, VA
February 17, 2019; 3:00 pm, ESPN2	No. 2	No. 20 Miami (FL)	L 73–79	23–2 (10–2)	KFC Yum! Center (12,193); Louisville, KY
February 21, 2019; 7:00 pm, ACCN Extra	No. 4	at Virginia	W 71–49	24–2 (11–2)	John Paul Jones Arena (2,588); Charlottesville, VA
February 24, 2019; 2:00 pm, ACCN Extra	No. 4	Boston College	W 87–51	25–2 (12–2)	KFC Yum! Center (11,132); Louisville, KY
February 28, 2019; 7:00 pm, ACCN Extra	No. 3	No. 10 NC State	W 92–62	26–2 (13–2)	KFC Yum! Center (10,602); Louisville, KY
March 3, 2019; 2:00 pm, ACCN Extra	No. 3	at Pittsburgh	W 67–40	27–2 (14–2)	Petersen Events Center (1,381); Pittsburgh, PA
ACC Women's Tournament
March 8, 2019; 7:00 pm, RSN	(2) No. 3	vs. (7) Clemson; Quarterfinals	W 75–67	28–2	Greensboro Coliseum (5,646); Greensboro, NC
March 9, 2019; 2:30 pm, ESPNU	(2) No. 3	vs. (3) No. 9 NC State; Semifinals	W 78–68	29–2	Greensboro Coliseum (6,943); Greensboro, NC
March 10, 2019; 12:00 pm, ESPN2	(1) No. 3	vs. (2) No. 4 Notre Dame; Championship Game	L 79–99	29–3	Greensboro Coliseum (10,104); Greensboro, NC
NCAA Women's Tournament
March 22, 2019*; 12:00 pm, ESPN2	(1 A) No. 5	(16 A) Robert Morris; First Round	W 69–34	30–3	KFC Yum! Center (6,593); Louisville, KY
March 24, 2019*; 12:00 pm, ESPN2	(1 A) No. 5	(8 A) Michigan; Second Round	W 71–50	31–3	KFC Yum! Center (7,725); Louisville, KY
March 29, 2019*; 9:30 pm, ESPN	(1 A) No. 5	vs. (4 A) No. 11 Oregon State; Sweet Sixteen	W 61–44	32–3	Times Union Center (8,765); Albany, NY
March 31, 2019*; 12:00 pm, ESPN	(1 A) No. 5	vs. (2 A) No. 2 Connecticut; Elite Eight	L 73–80	32–4	Times Union Center (9,204); Albany, NY
*Non-conference game. ^{#}Rankings from AP Poll. (#) Tournament seedings in parentheses. A=Albany Region. All times are in Eastern.
