= Florida A&M University Developmental Research School =

K-12 school affiliated with Florida A&M

Coordinates: 30°24′49.6″N 84°17′18.2″W

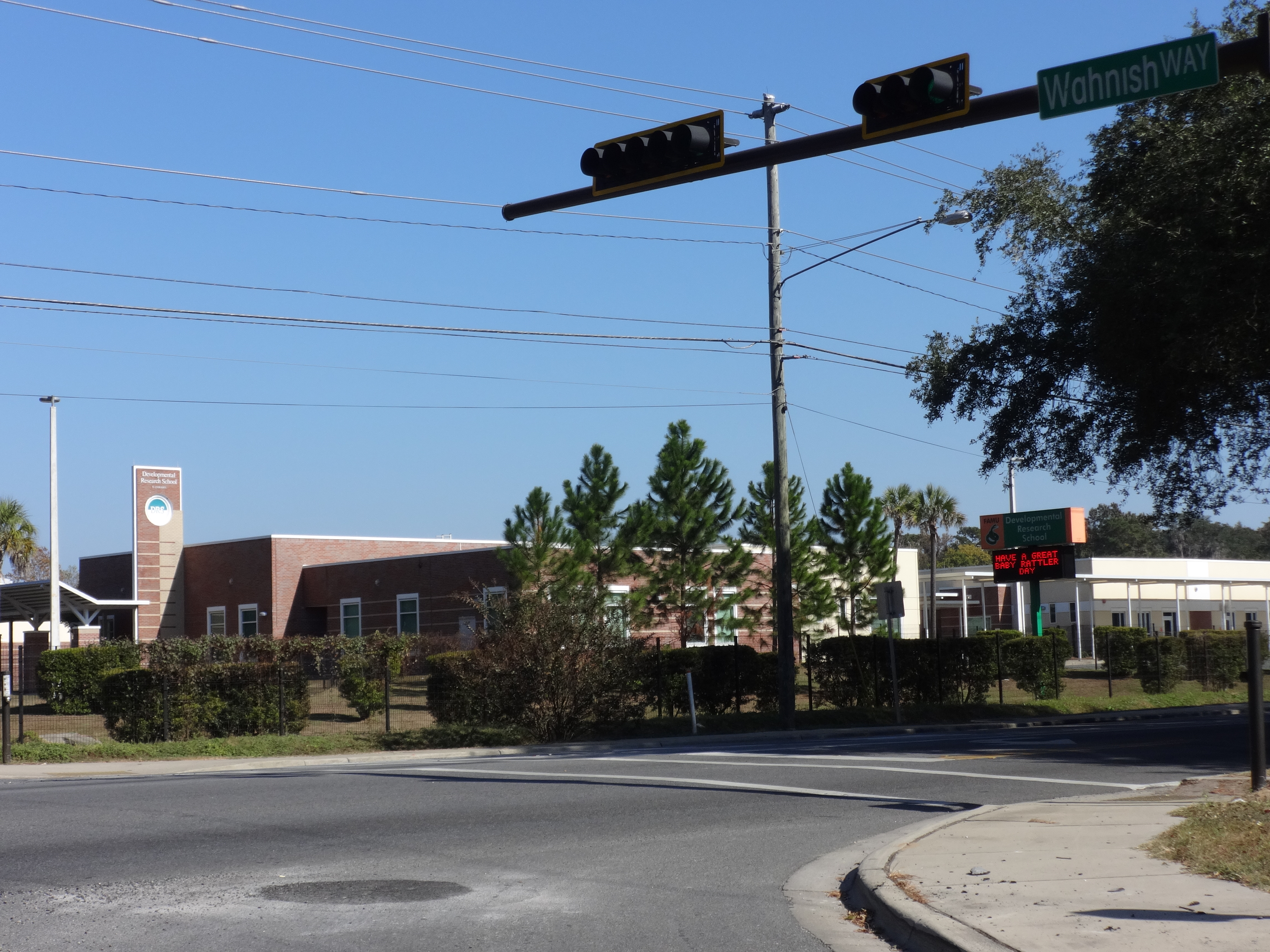
Florida A&M University Developmental Research School

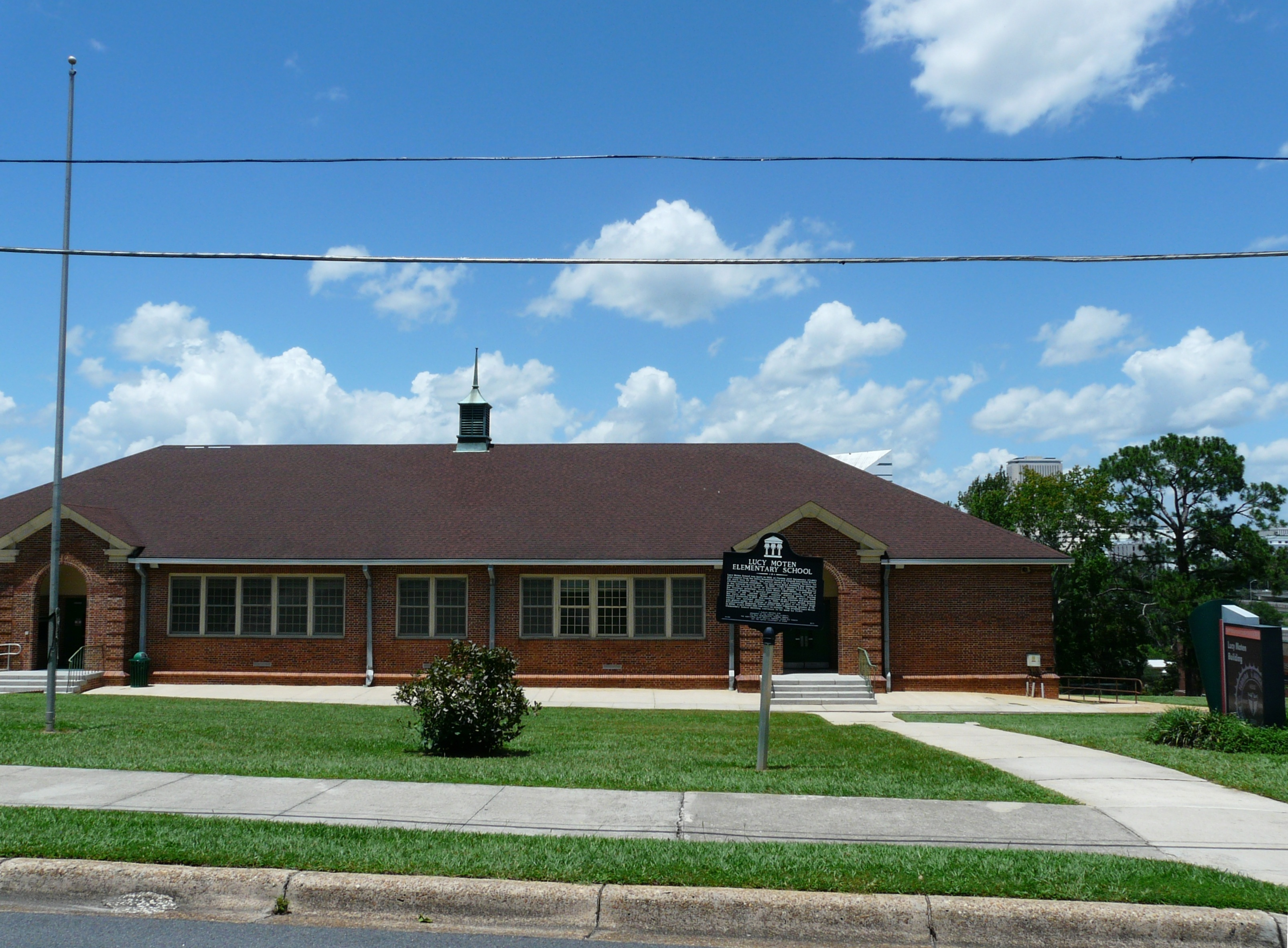
1932 location

Florida A&M University Developmental Research School (FAMU-DRS) is a K-12 laboratory school in Tallahassee, Florida, affiliated with Florida A&M University.

It was established in 1887 with elementary grades, before expanding to junior high school at a later point. Its original location was a temporary facility at 424 Osceola Street. In its history it was known as the Demonstration Elementary School and The Model School. It was named the Lucy Moten Elementary at Florida A&M University in 1932. Its name changed from a "laboratory school" to the current one around the time the Sidney Martin Developmental Research School Act of 1991 passed.

== Notable alumni ==
- Otto Brown, former NFL player
- Ron Dugans, former NFL player
- Earl Holmes, former NFL player
- Chris Jackson, current NFL player
- Taylor Jacobs, former NFL player
- Jazmine Jones, current WNBA player
- Sam Madison, Assistant coach for the Kansas City Chiefs and former NFL player
