= 2019–20 Cincinnati Bearcats women's basketball team =

Intercollegiate basketball season

2019–20 Cincinnati Bearcats women's basketball
- Conference: American Athletic Conference
- Record: 22–10 (11–5 The American)
- Head coach: Michelle Clark-Heard (2nd season)
- Assistant coaches: Melissa Kolbe; Semeka Randall-Lay; Heath Alexander
- Home arena: Fifth Third Arena

2019–20 American Athletic Conference women's basketball standings
	Conf.				Overall
Team	W		L	PCT	W		L	PCT
No. 5 UConn	16	–	0	1.000	26	–	3	.897
Cincinnati	11	–	5	.688	20	–	9	.690
UCF	11	–	5	.688	19	–	9	.679
South Florida	10	–	6	.625	18	–	12	.600
Tulane	8	–	8	.500	13	–	16	.448
Temple	7	–	9	.438	15	–	14	.517
Wichita State	7	–	9	.438	15	–	14	.517
SMU	7	–	9	.438	13	–	15	.464
East Carolina	6	–	10	.375	9	–	20	.310
Houston	5	–	11	.313	12	–	18	.400
Memphis	4	–	12	.250	13	–	16	.448
Tulsa	4	–	12	.250	9	–	20	.310
† 2020 AAC tournament winner As of March 4, 2020; Rankings from AP poll

The 2019–20 Cincinnati Bearcats women's basketball team represented the University of Cincinnati during the 2019–20 NCAA Division I women's basketball season. The season marked the seventh for the Bearcats as members of the American Athletic Conference. The Bearcats, led by second year head coach Michelle Clark-Heard, played their home games at Fifth Third Arena.

== Previous season ==
Cincinnati finished the previous season 24–11, 12–4 in AAC play to finish in third place. They advanced to the semifinals of the American Athletic women's tournament where they lost to UCF. They received an automatic bid Women's National Invitation Tournament where they defeated Youngstown State, Minnesota, Butler in the first, second and third rounds before losing to TCU in the quarterfinals.

== Media ==
All games will have a video stream on Bearcats TV, ESPN3, or AAC Digital Network

== Offseason ==
=== Departing players ===
Name	Number	Pos.	Height	Year	Hometown	Notes
Nikira Goings	2	G	5'8"	Senior	Marietta, Georgia	Graduated
Michaela Porter	10	G	5'9"	Sophomore	Pittsburgh, Pennsylvania	Transferred to Appalachian State
Brianna Livingston	13	G	5'9"	Sophomore	Scarborough, Ontario	Transferred to Monmouth
Maya Benham	20	F	5'10"	Senior	Douglasville, Georgia	Graduated
Monique Thompson	22	G	5'8"	Graduate Student	Long Beach, California	Graduated
Chelsea Warren	25	F	5'9"	Senior	Red Oak, Texas	Graduated
I'Liyah Green	35	C	6'2"	RS Sophomore	Louisville, Kentucky	Transferred to EKU
Andeija Puckett	40	C	6'2"	Sophomore	Griffin, Georgia	Transferred to Ole Miss

=== 2019 Recruits ===
College recruiting information
Name	Hometown	School	Height	Weight	Commit date
Aleah Nelson; G	Nottingham, MD	{{{highschool}}}	5 ft 6 in (1.68 m)	N/A	
Aleah Nelson; G	Recruit ratings: ESPN: (90)				
Jada Scott; G	Townsend, GA	Frederica Academy	6 ft 1 in (1.85 m)	N/A	
Jada Scott; G	Recruit ratings: ESPN: (87)				
Jadyn Scott; F	Townsend, GA	Frederica Academy	6 ft 1 in (1.85 m)	N/A	
Jadyn Scott; F	Recruit ratings: ESPN: (88)				
Jana Abdullah; F	Alexandria, Egypt	King Integrated American School	6 ft 2 in (1.88 m)	N/A	
Jana Abdullah; F	Recruit ratings: No ratings found				
Jordan Tuff; G	Kernersville, NC	Connections Academy	5 ft 8 in (1.73 m)	N/A	
Jordan Tuff; G	Recruit ratings: ESPN: (88)				
Sofia Gritzali; G	Thessaloniki, Greece	Hellenic College of Thessaloniki	5 ft 6 in (1.68 m)	N/A	
Sofia Gritzali; G	Recruit ratings: No ratings found				
Chellia Watson; G	Winder, GA	Winder-Barrow	5 ft 8 in (1.73 m)	N/A	
Chellia Watson; G	Recruit ratings: No ratings found				
Overall recruit ranking:
Note: In many cases, Scout, Rivals, 247Sports, On3, and ESPN may conflict in their listings of height and weight.; In these cases, the average was taken. ESPN grades are on a 100-point scale.; Sources:

=== Incoming transfers ===
Name	Num.	Pos.	Height	Year	Hometown	Previous school
Arame Niang	15	F	6'3"	RS Junior	Rufisque, Senegal	Western Kentucky
Nesma Khalifa	22	C	6'4"	Sophomore	Alexandria, Egypt	Tallahassee CC

== Roster ==
2019–20 Cincinnati Bearcats women's basketball team
Players
Coaches

Pos.	#	Name	Height	Year	Previous school	Hometown
G	2	Aleah Nelson	5 ft 6 in (1.68 m)	Fr	McDonogh School	Nottingham, MD
G	3	Jada Scott	6 ft 1 in (1.85 m)	Fr	Frederica Academy	Townsend, GA
F	4	Angel Rizor	6 ft 0 in (1.83 m)	Sr	East Wake	Zebulon, NC
F	5	Jana Abdullah	6 ft 2 in (1.88 m)	Fr	King Integrated American School	Alexandria, Egypt
F	10	Jadyn Scott	6 ft 1 in (1.85 m)	Fr	Frederica Academy	Townsend, GA
G	11	Sam Rodgers	5 ft 10 in (1.78 m)	Sr	Lakota East	Cincinnati, OH
G	12	Antoinette Miller	5 ft 6 in (1.68 m)	Sr	Southfield-Lathrup	Detroit, MI
G	14	Addaya Moore	5 ft 10 in (1.78 m)	RS So	Illinois	Granite City, IL
F	15	Arame Niang	6 ft 3 in (1.91 m)	RS Jr	Western Kentucky	Rufisque, Senegal
G	21	Jordan Tuff	5 ft 8 in (1.73 m)	Fr	Connections Academy	Kernersville, NC
C	22	Nesma Khalifa	6 ft 4 in (1.93 m)	So	Tallahassee CC	Alexandria, Egypt
F	23	Iimar’i Thomas	5 ft 11 in (1.8 m)	Jr	Sacred Heart Cathedral Prep	Oakland, CA
G	30	Florence Sifa	5 ft 7 in (1.7 m)	Sr	Jacksonville College	Bujumbura, Burundi
G	33	Sofia Gritzali	5 ft 6 in (1.68 m)	Fr	Hellenic College of Thessaloniki	Thessaloniki, Greece
G	35	Chellia Watson	5 ft 8 in (1.73 m)	Fr	Winder-Barrow	Winder, GA

Head coach

- Michelle Clark-Heard (Western Kentucky)

Assistant coach(es)

- Melissa Kolbe (Wittenberg)
- Semeka Randall-Lay (Tennessee)
- Heath Alexander (Oregon)

Legend

- (C) Team captain
- (S) Suspended
- (I) Ineligible
- (W) Walk-on
- Injured
- Current redshirt

Roster

== Schedule and results ==
Date time, TV	Rank^{#}	Opponent^{#}	Result	Record	Site (attendance) city, state
Exhibition
10/29/2019*; 7:00 pm, Bearcats TV		University of Charleston	W 67–52		Fifth Third Arena (613); Cincinnati, OH
Non-conference regular season
11/05/2019*; 7:00 pm, Bearcats TV		Utah	W 68–62	1–0	Fifth Third Arena (737); Cincinnati, OH
11/10/2019*; 2:00 pm, Bearcats TV		Saint Louis	L 50–60	1–1	Fifth Third Arena (883); Cincinnati, OH
11/13/2019*; 7:00 pm, Bearcats TV		Ohio State	L 73–78 ^{OT}	1–2	Fifth Third Arena (1,219); Cincinnati, OH
11/16/2019*; 2:00 pm, Bearcats TV		Ball State	W 63–56	2–2	Fifth Third Arena (960); Cincinnati, OH
11/19/2019*; 7:00 pm, Bearcats TV		Chattanooga	W 72–53	3–2	Fifth Third Arena (788); Cincinnati, OH
11/27/2019*; 2:30 pm		vs. Iowa; Puerto Rico Clasico	L 61–69	3–3	Coliseo Ruben Rodriguez (100); San Juan, PR
11/28/2019*; 2:30 pm		vs. Bucknell; Puerto Rico Clasico	L 48–56	3–4	Coliseo Ruben Rodriguez (100); San Juan, PR
12/5/2019*; 6:00 pm, Bearcats TV		at VCU	W 58–56	4–4	Stuart C. Siegel Center (438); Richmond, VA
12/8/2019*; 7:00 pm, Bearcats TV		Miami (OH)	W 98–68	5–4	Fifth Third Arena (1,057); Cincinnati, OH
12/14/2019*; 2:00 pm, Bearcats TV		at Xavier; Crosstown Shootout	W 85–78	6–4	Cintas Center (5,180); Cincinnati, OH
12/17/2019*; 7:00 pm, Bearcats TV		Alabama A&M	W 62–47	7–4	Fifth Third Arena (718); Cincinnati, OH
12/21/2019*; 2:00 pm, Bearcats TV		Pittsburgh	W 69–53	8–4	Fifth Third Arena (886); Cincinnati, OH
12/30/2019*; 7:00 pm, Bearcats TV		Coppin State	W 86–40	9–4	Fifth Third Arena (1,084); Cincinnati, OH
AAC regular season
01/05/2020; 7:00 pm, ESPN2		at South Florida	L 68–76	9–5 (0–1)	Yuengling Center (2,204); Tampa, FL
01/08/2020; 8:00 pm, ADN		at Memphis	W 73–66	10–5 (1–1)	Elma Roane Fieldhouse (411); Memphis, TN
01/12/2020; 2:00 pm, ESPN2		UCF	W 81–64	11–5 (2–1)	Fifth Third Arena (1,258); Cincinnati, OH
01/18/2020; 4:30 pm, ESPN3		at Tulane	L 59–64	11–6 (2–2)	Devlin Fieldhouse (1,003); New Orleans, LA
01/22/2020; 7:00 pm, ESPN3		Houston	W 85–66	12–6 (3–2)	Fifth Third Arena (865); Cincinnati, OH
01/26/2020; 2:00 pm, ESPNU		Temple	W 86–81	13–6 (4–2)	Fifth Third Arena (1,443); Cincinnati, OH
01/30/2020; 7:00 pm, SNY/ESPN3		at No. 4 UConn	L 50–80	13–7 (4–3)	Harry A. Gampel Pavilion (8,026); Storrs, CT
02/02/2020; 12:00 pm, ESPNU		South Florida	W 60–55	14–7 (5–3)	Fifth Third Arena (1,141); Cincinnati, OH
02/08/2020; 3:00 pm		at SMU	W 73–58	15–7 (6–3)	Moody Coliseum (663); Dallas, TX
02/12/2020; 11:00 am, ADN		Tulsa	W 78–53	16–7 (7–3)	Fifth Third Arena (1,952); Cincinnati, OH
02/15/2020; 2:00 pm, ESPN3		at UCF	L 42–49	16–8 (7–4)	CFE Arena (3,483); Orlando, FL
02/18/2020; 8:00 pm, ADN		at Houston	W 74–65	17–8 (8–4)	Fertitta Center (590); Houston, TX
02/23/2020; 4:00 pm, ESPNU		Tulane	W 87–63	18–8 (9–4)	Fifth Third Arena (3,272); Cincinnati, OH
02/26/2020; 7:00 pm, SNY/ESPN3		No. 6 UConn	L 58–105	18–9 (9–5)	Fifth Third Arena (5,607); Cincinnati, OH
02/29/2020; 3:00 pm, ESPN3		at Wichita State	W 75–54	19–9 (10–5)	Charles Koch Arena (2,436); Wichita, KS
03/02/2020; 7:00 pm, Bearcats TV		East Carolina	W 76–53	20–9 (11–5)	Fifth Third Arena (789); Cincinnati, OH
AAC Women's Tournament
03/07/2020; 8:00 pm, ESPN3	(3)	vs. (11) Memphis; Quarterfinals	W 94–52	21–9	Mohegan Sun Arena (4,860); Uncasville, CT
03/08/2020; 6:30 pm, ESPNU	(3)	vs. (2) UCF; Semifinals	W 57–51	22–9	Mohegan Sun Arena (5,677); Uncasville, CT
03/09/2020; 7:00 pm, ESPN2	(3)	vs. (1) UConn; Championship	L 53–87	22–10	Mohegan Sun Arena (5,430); Uncasville, CT
*Non-conference game. ^{#}Rankings from AP Poll. (#) Tournament seedings in parentheses. All times are in EST.

== See also ==
- 2019–20 Cincinnati Bearcats men's basketball team
