= 2019–20 St. John's Red Storm women's basketball team =

American college basketball season

2019–20 St. John's Red Storm women's basketball
- Conference: Big East Conference
- Record: 19–12 (11–7 Big East)
- Head coach: Joe Tartamella (8th season)
- Assistant coaches: Jonath Nicholas; Rory Kuhn; Shenneika Smith
- Home arena: Carnesecca Arena

2019–20 Big East Conference women's basketball standings
	Conf.				Overall
Team	W		L	PCT	W		L	PCT
No. 15 DePaul	15	–	3	.833	28	–	5	.848
Marquette	13	–	5	.722	24	–	8	.750
Butler	11	–	7	.611	19	–	11	.633
Creighton	11	–	7	.611	19	–	11	.633
Seton Hall	11	–	7	.611	19	–	12	.613
St. John's	11	–	7	.611	19	–	12	.613
Villanova	11	–	7	.611	18	–	13	.581
Providence	3	–	15	.167	13	–	19	.406
Georgetown	2	–	16	.111	5	–	25	.167
Xavier	2	–	16	.111	3	–	27	.100
† 2020 Big East tournament winner As of April 1, 2020; Rankings from AP poll

The 2019–20 St. John's Red Storm women's basketball team represented St. John's University during the 2019–20 NCAA Division I women's basketball season. The Red Storm, led by sighth-year head coach Joe Tartamella, played their games at Carnesecca Arena and were members of the Big East Conference.

== Roster ==
2018–19 St. John's Red Storm women's basketball team
Players
Coaches

Pos.	#	Name	Height	Year	Previous school	Hometown
G	0	Alisha Kebbe	5 ft 10 in (1.78 m)	Sr	Neumann-Goretti	Philadelphia, PA
G	1	Unique Drake	5 ft 7 in (1.7 m)	Fr	Westwood	Columbia, SC
G	2	Leilani Correa	6 ft 0 in (1.83 m)	Fr	Manchester Township	Manchester, NJ
G	3	Tiana England	5 ft 7 in (1.7 m)	RS Jr	Stamford	Stamford, CT
F	4	Raven Farley	6 ft 4 in (1.93 m)	Jr	Queen of Peace	Elizabeth, NJ
G	5	Shamachya Duncan	5 ft 6 in (1.68 m)	Sr	The Patrick School	Staten Island, NY
F	11	Cecilia Holmberg	6 ft 2 in (1.88 m)	Fr	BC Luleå	Bjarred, Sweden
F	14	Sophia Nolan	6 ft 1 in (1.85 m)	Fr	Marquette Catholic	Valparaiso, IN
G	21	Qadashah Hoppie	5 ft 7 in (1.7 m)	Jr	The Patrick School	Staten Island, NY
G	23	Camree Gregg (redshirt)	5 ft 5 in (1.65 m)	So	Wayne Memorial	Westland, MI
G	25	Alissa Alston	5 ft 8 in (1.73 m)	RS Sr	Upper Room Christian Academy; Ole Miss	New Haven, CT
G	30	Kadaja Bailey	6 ft 0 in (1.83 m)	So	St. Mary's	Long Beach, NY
F	41	Emma Nolan	6 ft 1 in (1.85 m)	Fr	Marquette Catholic	Valparaiso, IN

Head coach

- Joe Tartamella (James Madison)

Assistant coach(es)

- Jonath Nicholas (Trinity (TX))
- Rory Kuhn (SUNY Cortland)
- Shenneika Smith (St. John's)

Legend

- (C) Team captain
- (S) Suspended
- (I) Ineligible
- (W) Walk-on
- Injured
- Current redshirt

Roster

== Schedule ==
Date time, TV	Rank^{#}	Opponent^{#}	Result	Record	Site (attendance) city, state
Non-conference regular season
Nov 5, 2019*; 5:00 pm, ESPN+		at St. Bonaventure	W 68–56	1–0	Reilly Center (1,071); St. Bonaventure, NY
Nov 13, 2019*; 7:00 pm, ESPN3		LaFayette	W 76–44	2–0	Carnesecca Arena (488); Queens, NY
Nov 17, 2019*; 2:00 pm, FloSports		at James Madison	L 73–76	2–1	JMU Convocation Center (1,942); Harrisonburg, VA
Nov 22, 2019*; 7:30 pm, ESPN3		Wake Forest	W 82–74	3–1	Carnesecca Arena (841); Queens, NY
Nov 25, 2019*; 7:00 pm, ESPN3		Massachusetts	W 82–71	4–1	Carnesecca Arena (582); Queens, NY
Nov 30, 2019*; 4:30 pm		vs. IUPUI; Lady Rebel Round-Up	L 78–85	4–2	Cox Pavilion; Las Vegas, NV
Dec 1, 2019*; 2:00 pm		at UNLV; Lady Rebel Round-Up	L 75–79 ^{OT}	4–3	Cox Pavilion; Las Vegas, NV
Dec 6, 2019*; 7:00 pm		at Yale	W 80–66	5–3	Lee Amphitheater (398); New Haven, CT
Dec 9, 2019*; 5:00 pm, ESPN3		Army	W 96–60	6–3	Carnesecca Arena (555); Queens, NY
Dec 15, 2019*; 2:00 pm		at No. 8 Florida State	L 70–74	6–4	Donald L. Tucker Center (2,563); Tallahassee, FL
Dec 20, 2019*; 1:00 pm, ESPN3		Fairfield	W 71–69 ^{OT}	7–4	Carnesecca Arena (407); Queens, NY
Big East regular season
Dec 29, 2019; 2:00 pm, BEDN		at Xavier	W 75–67	8–4 (1–0)	Cintas Center (589); Cincinnati, OH
Dec 31, 2019; 4:00 pm, BEDN		at Butler	W 67–42	9–4 (2–0)	Hinkle Fieldhouse (646); Indianapolis, IN
Jan 3, 2020; 7:00 pm, BEDN		Georgetown	W 71–54	10–4 (3–0)	Carnesecca Arena (537); Queens, NY
Jan 5, 2020; 2:00 pm, CBSSN		Villanova	L 62–67 ^{OT}	10–5 (3–1)	Carnesecca Arena (784); Queens, NY
Jan 10, 2020; 8:00 pm, BEDN		at Marquette	L 85–94	10–6 (3–2)	Al McGuire Center (901); Milwaukee, WI
Jan 12, 2020; 1:00 pm, FS1		at No. 15 DePaul	L 69–74	10–7 (3–3)	McGrath-Phillips Arena (1,622); Chicago, IL
Jan 17, 2020; 11:00 am, BEDN		Providence	W 64–58	11–7 (4–3)	Carnesecca Arena (5,602); Queens, NY
Jan 19, 2020; 2:00 pm, BEDN		Creighton	W 63–58	12–7 (5–3)	Carnesecca Arena (467); Queens, NY
Jan 26, 2020; 6:30 pm, FS1		at Seton Hall	W 82–66	13–7 (6–3)	Walsh Gymnasium (1,052); South Orange, NJ
Jan 31, 2020; 7:00 pm, BEDN		at Villanova	L 64–66 ^{OT}	13–8 (6–4)	Finneran Pavilion (861); Villanova, PA
Feb 2, 2020; 2:00 pm, BEDN		at Georgetown	W 74–68	14–8 (7–4)	McDonough Arena (1,113); Washington, D.C.
Feb 7, 2020; 7:00 pm, BEDN		No. 14 DePaul	L 65–71	14–9 (7–5)	Carnesecca Arena (610); Queens, NY
Feb 9, 2020; 2:00 pm, BEDN		Marquette	L 57–67	14–10 (7–6)	Carnesecca Arena (621); Queens, NY
Feb 14, 2020; 7:00 pm, FS2		at Creighton	W 77–70	15–10 (8–6)	D. J. Sokol Arena (1,287); Omaha, NE
Feb 16, 2020; 1:00 pm, BEDN		at Providence	L 53–54	15–11 (8–7)	Alumni Hall (602); Providence, RI
Feb 22, 2020; 2:00 pm, BEDN		Seton Hall	W 77–76	16–11 (9–7)	Carnesecca Arena (936); Queens, NY
Feb 28, 2020; 7:00 pm, BEDN		Butler	W 85–80	17–11 (10–7)	Carnesecca Arena (525); Queens, NY
Mar 1, 2020; 4:00 pm, BEDN		Xavier	W 74–37	18–11 (11–7)	Carnesecca Arena (4,260); Queens, NY
Big East Women's Tournament
Mar 7, 2019; 9:30 pm, FS2	(3)	vs. (6) Creighton; Quarterfinals	W 70–54	19–11	Wintrust Arena (2,010); Chicago, IL
Mar 8, 2019; 8:30 pm, FS1	(3)	vs. (2) Marquette; Semifinals	L 55–78	19–12	Wintrust Arena (2,372); Chicago, IL
*Non-conference game. ^{#}Rankings from AP Poll. (#) Tournament seedings in parentheses.
