= 2019–20 UCF Knights women's basketball team =

Intercollegiate basketball season

2019–20 UCF Knights women's basketball
- Conference: American Athletic Conference
- Record: 20–10 (11–5 The American)
- Head coach: Katie Abrahamson-Henderson (4th season)
- Assistant coaches: Tahnee Balerio; Nykesha Sales; Isoken Uzamere
- Home arena: CFE Arena

2019–20 American Athletic Conference women's basketball standings
	Conf.				Overall
Team	W		L	PCT	W		L	PCT
No. 5 UConn	16	–	0	1.000	26	–	3	.897
Cincinnati	11	–	5	.688	20	–	9	.690
UCF	11	–	5	.688	19	–	9	.679
South Florida	10	–	6	.625	18	–	12	.600
Tulane	8	–	8	.500	13	–	16	.448
Temple	7	–	9	.438	15	–	14	.517
Wichita State	7	–	9	.438	15	–	14	.517
SMU	7	–	9	.438	13	–	15	.464
East Carolina	6	–	10	.375	9	–	20	.310
Houston	5	–	11	.313	12	–	18	.400
Memphis	4	–	12	.250	13	–	16	.448
Tulsa	4	–	12	.250	9	–	20	.310
† 2020 AAC tournament winner As of March 4, 2020; Rankings from AP poll

The 2019–20 UCF Knights women's basketball team represented the University of Central Florida during the 2019–20 NCAA Division I basketball season. The Knights compete in Division I of the National Collegiate Athletic Association (NCAA) and the American Athletic Conference (The American). The Knights, in the program's 43rd season of basketball, were led by fourth-year head coach Katie Abrahamson-Henderson, and played their home games at the CFE Arena on the university's main campus in Orlando, Florida.

They finished the season 19–9, 11–5 in AAC play to finish in second place in the regular season. In the 2020 American Athletic Conference women's basketball tournament at the Mohegan Sun Arena in Uncasville, Connecticut they reached the semi-final, where they were ousted by the Cincinnati Bearcats 57-51.

== Media ==
All UCF games had an audio or video broadcast available. For conference play, UCF games were typically available on ESPN3, AAC Digital, or UCF Knights All-Access. Road games not on ESPN3 or AAC Digital had an audio broadcast available on the UCF portal. All non-conference home games were streamed exclusively on UCF Knights All-Access. Select non-conference road games had a stream available through the opponent's website. The audio broadcast for home games was only available through UCF Knights All-Access.

== Roster ==
2019–20 UCF Knights women's basketball team
Players
Coaches

Pos.	#	Name	Height	Year	Previous school	Hometown
G	0	Sianni Martin	5 ft 8 in (1.73 m)	RS Sr	Neumann Goretti HS; Towson	Philadelphia, PA
G	1	Georgia Gayle	5 ft 9 in (1.75 m)	Jr	Bradfield School; Northwest Florida State College	Sheffield, UK
G	2	Korneila Wright	5 ft 7 in (1.7 m)	Sr	Jones HS	Orlando, FL
G	3	Diamond Battles	5 ft 8 in (1.73 m)	So	Winter Haven HS	Winter Haven, FL
F	5	Masseny Kaba	6 ft 3 in (1.91 m)	Jr	Cathedral HS	Dorchester, MA
G/F	10	Courtajia Sanders	6 ft 1 in (1.85 m)	Jr	Bartow HS	Bartow, FL
G	11	Becca Ripley	6 ft 0 in (1.83 m)	RS So	New Hampshire School	Stratham, NH
F	23	Caroline Daniels	6 ft 0 in (1.83 m)	Fr	Forest HS	Ocala, FL
F	24	Jnaya Walker	6 ft 1 in (1.85 m)	Jr	Bolingbrook HS; Trinity Valley Community College	Bolingbrook, IL
G	25	Ahna Burney	5 ft 8 in (1.73 m)	Fr	DME Sports Academy	Vancouver, WA
F	32	Britney Smith	6 ft 3 in (1.91 m)	So	Boone HS	Orlando, FL
F	33	Destiny Thomas	6 ft 2 in (1.88 m)	Fr	Forest Park HS	Atlanta, GA
F	45	Grace Stant	6 ft 0 in (1.83 m)	RS Sr	Rumson-Fair Haven HS; Villanova	Red Bank, NJ
G	55	Breyanna Frazier	5 ft 8 in (1.73 m)	Fr	Marist HS	Jersey City, NJ

Head coach

- Katie Abrahamson-Henderson (Iowa)

Assistant coach(es)

- Tahnee Balerio (Missouri State)
- Nykesha Sales (Connecticut)
- Isoken Uzamere (Hofstra)

Legend

- (C) Team captain
- (S) Suspended
- (I) Ineligible
- (W) Walk-on
- Injured
- Current redshirt

Roster

== Schedule and results ==
Date time, TV	Rank^{#}	Opponent^{#}	Result	Record	Site (attendance) city, state
Non-conference regular season
11/06/2019*; 11:00 am		Pittsburgh	W 74–58	1–0	Addition Financial Arena (6,973); Orlando, FL
11/09/2019*; 8:00 pm, ESPN+		at Belmont	L 37–72	1–1	Curb Event Center (878); Nashville, TN
11/13/2019*; 7:00 pm, ESPN+		at Florida Gulf Coast	L 50–72	1–2	Alico Arena (3,077); Fort Myers, FL
11/16/2019*; 4:00 pm, ESPN3		at Stephen F. Austin	W 63–57	2–2	Johnson Coliseum (2,147); Nacogdoches, TX
11/24/2019*; 2:00 pm		Delaware	W 75–49	3–2	Addition Financial Arena (3,434); Orlando, FL
11/27/2019*; 1:00 pm		Stetson	W 66–40	4–2	Additional Financial Arena (3,256); Orlando, FL
11/30/2019*; 4:30 pm		vs. No. 11 UCLA; Cavalier Classic	L 56–61	4–3	Jones Arena; Charlottesville, VA
12/01/2019*; 1:00 pm		vs. James Madison; Cavalier Classic	L 43–46	4–4	Jones Arena (277); Charlottesville, VA
12/17/2019*; 6:00 pm		Quinnipiac	W 80–58	5–4	Additional Financial Arena (3,213); Orlando, FL
12/20/2019*; 2:30 pm		Saint Mary's; UCF Holiday Tournament	W 67–58	6–4	Additional Financial Arena (3,165); Orlando, FL
12/21/2019*; 1:30 pm		Wright State; UCF Holiday Tournament	W 69–53	7–4	Addition Financial Arena (3,377); Orlando, FL
12/30/2019*; 6:00 pm		Central Michigan	W 64–58	8–4	Addition Financial Arena (3,438); Orlando, FL
AAC regular season
01/05/2020; 12:00 pm, CBSSN		East Carolina	W 91–55	9–4 (1–0)	Addition Financial Arena (3,329); Orlando, FL
01/12/2020; 7:00 pm, ESPN2		at Cincinnati	L 64–81	9–5 (1–1)	Fifth Third Arena (1,258); Cincinnati, OH
01/16/2020; 6:00 pm, ESPN3		No. 4 Connecticut	L 52–59	9–6 (1–2)	Addition Financial Arena (5,175); Orlando, FL
01/19/2020; 3:00 pm, ESPN2		at South Florida; War on I-4	W 64–57	10–6 (2–2)	Yuengling Center (3,017); Tampa, FL
01/22/2020; 8:00 pm		at Tulane	L 59–60	10–7 (2–3)	Devlin Fieldhouse (588); New Orleans, LA
01/25/2020; 2:00 pm		Memphis	W 82–66	11–7 (3–3)	Addition Financial Arena (3,423); Orlando, FL
01/29/2020; 7:00 pm		at Temple	L 65–67	11–8 (3–4)	McGonigle Hall (1,277); Philadelphia, PA
02/01/2020; 2:00 pm		SMU	W 67–57	12–8 (4–4)	Additional Financial Arena (3,505); Orlando, FL
02/05/2020; 8:00 pm		at Tulsa	W 62–49	13–8 (5–4)	Reynolds Center (755); Tulsa, OK
02/12/2020; 8:00 pm		at Houston	W 67–49	14–8 (6–4)	Fertitta Center (674); Houston, TX
02/15/2020; 2:00 pm, ESPN3		Cincinnati	W 49–42	15–8 (7–4)	Additional Financial Arena (3,483); Orlando, FL
02/19/2020; 6:00 pm, ESPN3		South Florida; War on I-4	W 56–48	16–8 (8–4)	Additional Financial Arena (3,992); Orlando, FL
02/22/2020; 1:00 pm, ESPN3		at No. 6 Connecticut	L 53–66	16–9 (8–5)	Gampel Pavilion (10,167); Storrs, CT
02/26/2020; 6:00 pm, ESPN3		Temple	W 67–64	17–9 (9–5)	Addition Financial Arena (3,385); Orlando, FL
02/29/2020; 3:00 pm		at Memphis	W 67–59	18–9 (10–5)	Elma Roane Fieldhouse (511); Memphis, TN
03/02/2020; 7:00 pm, CBSSN		Wichita State	W 95–50	19–9 (11–5)	Addition Financial Arena (3,491); Orlando, FL
AAC Women's Tournament
03/07/2020; 6:00 pm, ESPN3	(2)	vs. (7) Wichita State; Quarterfinals	W 65–32	20–9	Mohegan Sun Arena; Uncasville, CT
03/08/2020; 6:30 pm, ESPNU	(2)	vs. (3) Cincinnati; Semifinals	L 51–57	20–10	Mohegan Sun Arena; Uncasville, CT
*Non-conference game. ^{#}Rankings from AP Poll. (#) Tournament seedings in parentheses. All times are in Eastern Time.

== Rankings ==
2019–20 NCAA Division I women's basketball rankings

+ Regular season polls	Poll	Pre- Season	Week 2	Week 3	Week 4	Week 5	Week 6	Week 7	Week 8	Week 9	Week 10	Week 11	Week 12	Week 13	Week 14	Week 15	Week 16	Week 17	Week 18	Week 19	Final
AP																				N/A	
Coaches	RV																				

Legend
	Increase in ranking
	Decrease in ranking
	Not ranked previous week
(RV)	Received votes

== See also ==
- 2019–20 UCF Knights men's basketball team
