= Joe Tartamella =

American basketball coach

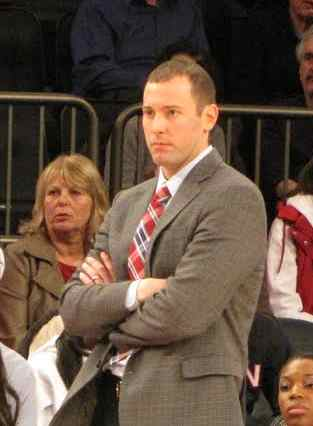
- Tartamella in 2013

Current position
- Title: Head coach
- Team: St. John's
- Conference: Big East
- Record: 261–185 (.585)

Biographical details
- Born: June 2, 1979 (age 47); St. James, New York, U.S.
- Education: James Madison

Coaching career (HC unless noted)
- 2004–2005: SUNY Maritime College (Asst.)
- 2005–2008: St. John's (Asst.)
- 2008–2012: St. John's (Assoc. HC)
- 2012–present: St. John's

Head coaching record
- Overall: 261–185 (.585)

Accomplishments and honors

Championships
- Big East tournament championship (2016)

Awards
- Big East Conference Coach of the Year (2023)

Joe Tartamella (born June 2, 1979) is the current head coach of the St. John's University women's basketball team.

== Head coaching record ==
Record table
Season	Team	Overall	Conference	Standing	Postseason
St. John's (Big East Conference) (2012–present)
2012–13	St. John's	18–13	11–5	T–3rd	NCAA 1st Round
2013–14	St. John's	23–11	13–5	2nd	NCAA 2nd Round
2014–15	St. John's	23–11	11–7	4th	WNIT Third Round
2015–16	St. John's	23–10	11–7	4th	NCAA 1st Round
2016–17	St. John's	22–12	11–7	T–4th	WNIT Third Round
2017–18	St. John's	19–15	9–9	T–5th	WNIT Quarterfinal
2018–19	St. John's	15–16	7–11	T–8th	
2019–20	St. John's	19–12	11–7	T–3rd	
2020–21	St. John's	8–15	4–12	8th	
2021–22	St. John's	12–19	7–12	7th	
2022–23	St. John's	23–9	13–7	T–4th	NCAA 1st Round
2023–24	St. John's	18–15	11–7	T–3rd	WBIT Second Round
2024–25	St. John's	16–15	5–13	T–8th	
2025–26	St. John's	22–12	11–9	T–5th	WBIT First Round
St. John's:		261–185 (.585)	135–118 (.534)		
Total:		261–185 (.585)			
National champion Postseason invitational champion Conference regular season champion Conference regular season and conference tournament champion Division regular season champion Division regular season and conference tournament champion Conference tournament champion
