= 2019–20 Drexel Dragons women's basketball team =

American college basketball season

2019–20 Drexel Dragons women's basketball

CAA regular season co-champions
- Conference: Colonial Athletic Association
- Record: 23–7 (16–2 CAA)
- Head coach: Denise Dillon (17th season)
- Assistant coaches: Amy Mallon (16th season); Stacy Weiss (8th season); Michelle Baker (6th season)
- Home arena: Daskalakis Athletic Center

2019–20 CAA women's basketball standings
	Conf.				Overall
Team	W		L	PCT	W		L	PCT
Drexel	16	–	2	.889	23	–	7	.767
James Madison	16	–	2	.889	25	–	4	.862
William & Mary	12	–	6	.667	21	–	8	.724
Towson	9	–	9	.500	14	–	15	.483
Northeastern	9	–	9	.500	13	–	16	.448
Elon	8	–	10	.444	12	–	17	.414
Delaware	8	–	10	.444	14	–	16	.467
Charleston	6	–	12	.333	13	–	17	.433
UNC Wilmington	6	–	12	.333	10	–	20	.333
Hofstra	0	–	18	.000	3	–	27	.100
† 2020 CAA tournament winner Rankings from AP poll

The 2019–20 Drexel Dragons women's basketball team represented Drexel University during the 2019–20 NCAA Division I women's basketball season. The Dragons, led by seventeenth-year head coach Denise Dillon, played their home games at the Daskalakis Athletic Center in Philadelphia, Pennsylvania as members of the Colonial Athletic Association. They finished the season 23–7, 16–2 in CAA play to finish in first place. Before they could play in the CAA tournament however, the tournament was cancelled due to the COVID-19 pandemic.

== Offseason ==
=== Departures ===
Name	Number	Pos.	Height	Year	Hometown	Notes
Eline Maesschalck	10	F	5'11"	Senior	Aalst, Belgium	Graduated
Tereza Kracikova	34	C	6'2"	Senior	Prague, Czech Republic	Graduated

=== 2019 recruiting class ===
College recruiting information
Name	Hometown	School	Height	Weight	Commit date
Brianne Borcky; PF	Glen Mills, PA	Garnet Valley HS	6 ft 0 in (1.83 m)	N/A	Aug 29, 2017
Brianne Borcky; PF	Recruit ratings: No ratings found				
AJ Davis; F	Baltimore, MD	McDonogh School	6 ft 1 in (1.85 m)	N/A	Dec 13, 2017
AJ Davis; F	Recruit ratings: No ratings found				
Hetta Saatman; C	Lancaster, PA	Linden Hall	6 ft 3 in (1.91 m)	N/A	May 15, 2018
Hetta Saatman; C	Recruit ratings: No ratings found				
Maria Ferariu; W	Braşov, Romania	Roland Park Country School	6 ft 1 in (1.85 m)	N/A	Aug 29, 2018
Maria Ferariu; W	Recruit ratings: No ratings found				
Overall recruit ranking:
Note: In many cases, Scout, Rivals, 247Sports, On3, and ESPN may conflict in their listings of height and weight.; In these cases, the average was taken. ESPN grades are on a 100-point scale.; Sources: "Drexel 2019 Basketball Commitments". Rivals.; "Drexel Dragons". ESPN.; "2019 Team Ranking". Rivals.

== Roster ==
2019–20 Drexel Dragons women's basketball team
Players
Coaches

Pos.	#	Name	Height	Year	Previous school	Hometown
G	1	Keishana Washington	5 ft 7 in (1.7 m)	So	Durham Elite Prep	Pickering, Ontario
F	2	Hetta Saatman	6 ft 2 in (1.88 m)	Fr	Linden Hall	Lancaster, PA
F	3	AJ Davis	6 ft 1 in (1.85 m)	Fr	McDonogh School	Baltimore, MD
G	4	Kayla Bacon	5 ft 8 in (1.73 m)	Jr	Seton Keough	Owings Mills, MD
G	5	Maria Ferariu (redshirt)	6 ft 0 in (1.83 m)	Fr	Roland Park Country School	Brașov, Romania
G	11	Aubree Brown	5 ft 11 in (1.8 m)	RS Sr	Archbishop Wood	Philadelphia, PA
G	12	Hannah Nihill	5 ft 3 in (1.6 m)	Jr	Cardinal O'Hara	Drexel Hill, PA
F	15	Brianne Borcky	6 ft 0 in (1.83 m)	Fr	Garnet Valley HS	Glen Mills, PA
F	20	Kate Connolly	6 ft 1 in (1.85 m)	So	Souderton Area HS	Harleysville, PA
G	22	Maura Hendrixson	5 ft 9 in (1.75 m)	So	Cardinal O'Hara HS (PA)	Garnet Valley, PA
F	23	Bailey Greenberg	5 ft 11 in (1.8 m)	Sr	Archbishop Wood	North Wales, PA
F	24	Niki Metzel	6 ft 2 in (1.88 m)	Sr	Rutgers Prep	Princeton, NJ
F	30	Mariah Leonard	5 ft 10 in (1.78 m)	RS Jr	Broad Run	Ashburn, VA
G	50	Ana Ferariu	5 ft 9 in (1.75 m)	Sr	Johannes Honterus	Brașov, Romania

Head coach

- Denise Dillon (Villanova)

Assistant coach(es)

- Amy Mallon (Saint Joseph's)
- Stacy Weiss (Drexel)
- Michelle Baker (Saint Joseph's)

Legend

- (C) Team captain
- (S) Suspended
- (I) Ineligible
- (W) Walk-on
- Injured
- Current redshirt

Roster
Last update: June 25, 2018

== Schedule and results ==
Date time, TV	Rank^{#}	Opponent^{#}	Result	Record	High points	High rebounds	High assists	Site (attendance) city, state
Exhibition
August 17, 2019*; 10:00 am		at Greece U16	W 78–61		15 – Washington	–	–	Athens, Greece
August 20, 2019*; 9:00 am		at Greece	W 64–51		20 – Greenberg	6 – Tied	–	P.A.O.K. Sports Arena; Thessaloniki, Greece
August 22, 2019*; 10:00 am		at Northern Greece	W 92–37		12 – Borcky	–	7 – Nihill	Anatolia College Gym; Thessaloniki, Greece
October 26, 2019*; 2:00 pm		Jefferson						Daskalakis Athletic Center; Philadelphia, PA
Non-conference regular season
November 5, 2019*; 6:00 pm, ESPN3		at Quinnipiac	W 66–62	1–0	31 – Greenberg	12 – Greenberg	4 – Brown	People's United Center (478); Hamden, CT
November 9, 2019*; 2:00 pm		Davidson; Preseason WNIT First Round	W 74–63	2–0	31 – Greenberg	6 – Tied	7 – Nihill	Daskalakis Athletic Center (716); Philadelphia, PA
November 11, 2019*; 8:00 pm		at No. 18 DePaul; Preseason WNIT Quarterfinals	L 57–81	2–1	17 – Greenberg	4 – Tied	3 – A. Ferariu	McGrath-Phillips Arena (1,335); Chicago, IL
November 16, 2019*; 2:00 pm		Pacific; Preseason WNIT Consolation	L 51–58	2–2	11 – Tied	6 – A. Ferariu	4 – Brown	Daskalakis Athletic Center (437); Philadelphia, PA
November 24, 2019*; 2:00 pm		Richmond	W 58–52	3–2	25 – Greenberg	5 – Tied	7 – Brown	Daskalakis Athletic Center (701); Philadelphia, PA
November 30, 2019*; 2:00 pm		vs. Buffalo; Saint Joseph's Tournament semifinals	L 59–63	3–3	16 – Greenberg	8 – Greenberg	7 – Brown	Hagan Arena (538); Philadelphia, PA
December 1, 2019*; ESPN+, 2:00 pm		at Saint Joseph's; Saint Joseph's Tournament 3rd Place	W 62–52	4–3	24 – Greenberg	7 – Brown	9 – Brown	Hagan Arena (572); Philadelphia, PA
December 4, 2019*; 5:00 pm		Villanova	W 54–52 ^{OT}	5–3	20 – Greenberg	10 – Metzel	4 – Tied	Daskalakis Athletic Center (775); Philadelphia, PA
December 8, 2019*; 2:00 pm		at Bucknell	L 49–60	5–4	16 – Greenberg	6 – Greenberg	7 – Brown	Sojka Pavilion (871); Lewisburg, PA
December 17, 2019*; 11:30 am, NBCS+		La Salle	W 69–31	6–4	16 – Greenberg	6 – Tied	5 – Brown	Daskalakis Athletic Center (634); Philadelphia, PA
December 20, 2019*; 11:30 am, ESPN+		at Penn; Battle of 33rd Street	L 49–53	6–5	13 – Gerenberg	8 – Tied	3 – Tied	Palestra (781); Philadelphia, PA
December 30, 2019*; 4:30 pm		Maine	W 70–57	7–5	32 – Greenberg	7 – A. Ferariu	7 – Brown	Daskalakis Athletic Center (668); Philadelphia, PA
CAA regular season
January 3, 2020; 6:30 pm		at Charleston	L 59–73	7–6 (0–1)	18 – Greenberg	9 – Greenberg	6 – Nihill	TD Arena (377); Charleston, SC
January 5, 2020; 1:00 pm		at UNC Wilmington	W 73–72 ^{OT}	8–6 (1–1)	22 – Greenberg	9 – Metzel	8 – Brown	Trask Coliseum (451); Wilmington, NC
January 10, 2020; 7:00 pm, NBCS+		Northeastern	W 50–41	9–6 (2–1)	13 – Tied	6 – Leonard	3 – Washington	Daskalakis Athletic Center (699); Philadelphia, PA
January 12, 2020; 7:00 pm		Hofstra	W 74–54	10–6 (3–1)	14 – Washington	6 – Leonard	5 – Nihill	Daskalakis Athletic Center (580); Philadelphia, PA
January 19, 2020; 2:00 pm, NBCS+		Delaware	W 63–59 ^{OT}	11–6 (4–1)	26 – Greenberg	6 – Tied	8 – Brown	Daskalakis Athletic Center (759); Philadelphia, PA
January 24, 2020; 7:00 pm		at Elon	W 55–53 ^{OT}	12–6 (5–1)	13 – Tied	8 – Tied	6 – Nihill	Schar Center (483); Elon, NC
January 26, 2020; 2:00 pm		at William & Mary	W 61–54	13–6 (6–1)	16 – Metzel	6 – Greenberg	6 – Brown	Kaplan Arena (813); Williamsburg, VA
January 31, 2020; 7:00 pm		Towson	W 59–50	14–6 (7–1)	19 – Greenberg	7 – 3 Tied	6 – Brown	Daskalakis Athletic Center (731); Philadelphia, PA
February 2, 2020; 2:00 pm		James Madison	W 70–48	15–6 (8–1)	27 – Washington	8 – Greenberg	7 – Brown	Daskalakis Athletic Center (768); Philadelphia, PA
February 7, 2020; 5:00 pm		at Hofstra	W 45–32	16–6 (9–1)	10 – Leonard	10 – Greenberg	5 – Brown	Hofstra Arena (260); Hempstead, NY
February 9, 2020; 2:05 pm		at Northeastern	W 67–51	17–6 (10–1)	14 – Tied	10 – Greenberg	4 – Brown	Cabot Center (605); Boston, MA
February 16, 2020; 1:00 pm, NBCSPHI		at Delaware	W 52–32	18–6 (11–1)	14 – Washington	7 – Brown	5 – Nihill	Bob Carpenter Center (1,652); Newark, DE
February 21, 2020; 7:00 pm, NBCS+		William & Mary	W 87–74 ^{OT}	19–6 (12–1)	25 – Washington	7 – Metzel	7 – Nihill	Daskalakis Athletic Center (627); Philadelphia, PA
February 23, 2020; 2:00 pm		Elon	W 66–47	20–6 (13–1)	16 – Washington	7 – Tied	7 – Brown	Daskalakis Athletic Center (977); Philadelphia, PA
February 28, 2020; 7:00 pm		at James Madison	L 39–69	20–7 (13–2)	10 – Washington	4 – Greenberg	2 – Tied	JMU Convocation Center (2,543); Harrisonburg, VA
March 1, 2020; 2:00 pm		at Towson	W 63–60	21–7 (14–2)	20 – Greenberg	6 – 3 Tied	5 – Tied	SECU Arena (802); Towson, MD
March 5, 2020; 7:00 pm, NBCS+		UNC Wilmington	W 52–50	22–7 (15–2)	16 – Greenberg	5 – Tied	5 – Nihill	Daskalakis Athletic Center (649); Philadelphia, PA
March 7, 2020; 1:00 pm		Charleston	W 72–60	23–7 (16–2)	18 – Washington	5 – Nihill	8 – Nihill	Daskalakis Athletic Center (908); Philadelphia, PA
CAA Tournament
March 12, 2020; 12:00 pm	(1)	vs. (9) UNC Wilmington; Quarterfinals	Cancelled due to the COVID-19 pandemic					Schar Center; Elon, NC
*Non-conference game. ^{#}Rankings from AP. (#) Tournament seedings in parentheses. All times are in Eastern Time.

== Rankings ==
+ Regular season polls	Poll	Pre- Season	Week 2	Week 3	Week 4	Week 5	Week 6	Week 7	Week 8	Week 9	Week 10	Week 11	Week 12	Week 13	Week 14	Week 15	Week 16	Week 17	Week 18	Week 19	Week 20	Final
AP																					N/A	
Coaches																	RV					

Legend
	Increase in ranking
	Decrease in ranking
	Not ranked previous week
RV	Received votes
NR	Not ranked
( )	Number of first place votes

^ Coaches did not release a Week 2 poll

== See also ==
- 2019–20 Drexel Dragons men's basketball team
