= 2020 Big East women's basketball tournament =

- Classification: Division I
- Season: 2019–20
- Teams: 10
- Site: Wintrust Arena; Chicago, IL
- Champions: DePaul (5th title)
- Winning coach: Doug Bruno (5th title)
- Television: FS1, FS2, BEDN

2019–20 Big East Conference women's basketball standings
	Conf.				Overall
Team	W		L	PCT	W		L	PCT
No. 15 DePaul	15	–	3	.833	28	–	5	.848
Marquette	13	–	5	.722	24	–	8	.750
Butler	11	–	7	.611	19	–	11	.633
Creighton	11	–	7	.611	19	–	11	.633
Seton Hall	11	–	7	.611	19	–	12	.613
St. John's	11	–	7	.611	19	–	12	.613
Villanova	11	–	7	.611	18	–	13	.581
Providence	3	–	15	.167	13	–	19	.406
Georgetown	2	–	16	.111	5	–	25	.167
Xavier	2	–	16	.111	3	–	27	.100
† 2020 Big East tournament winner As of April 1, 2020; Rankings from AP poll

The 2020 Big East women's basketball tournament took place March 6–9, 2020 and was held at Wintrust Arena in Chicago, Illinois. The winner received the conference's automatic bid to the eventually cancelled 2020 NCAA tournament.

== Seeds ==
2019 Big East women's basketball tournament seeds and results
Seed	School	Conf.	Over.	Tiebreaker
1	‡ † – DePaul	15–3	25-5	
2	† – Marquette	13-5	22-7	
3	† – St. John's	11–7	18-11	
4	† – Seton Hall	11-7	18-11	
5	† – Butler	11-7	19-10	
6	† – Creighton	11-7	18-10	
7	Villanova	11-7	17-12	
8	Providence	3-15	12-18	
9	Georgetown	2-16	5-24	
10	Xavier	2–16	3-26	
‡ – Big East regular season champions, and tournament No. 1 seed. † – Received a single-bye in the conference tournament. Overall records include all games played in the Big East tournament.

== Schedule ==
Game	Time*	Matchup^{#}	Television	Attendance
First round – Friday, March 6
1	11:00 AM	#9 Georgetown vs. #8 Providence	BEDN	
2	1:30 PM	#10 Xavier vs. #7 Villanova	BEDN	
Quarterfinals – Saturday, March 7
3	12:00 PM	#1 DePaul vs. #8 Providence	FS2	
4	2:30 PM	#4 Seton Hall vs #5 Butler	FS2	
5	6:00 PM	#2 Marquette vs. #7 Villanova	FS2	
6	8:30 PM	#3 St. John's vs. #6 Creighton	FS2	
Semifinals – Sunday, March 8
7	5:00 PM	#1 DePaul vs. #4 Seton Hall	FS1	
8	7:30 PM	#2 Marquette vs. #3 St. John's	FS1	
Championship – Monday, March 9
9	7:00 PM	#1 DePaul vs. #2 Marquette	FS1	
*Game Times in CT. #-Rankings denote tournament seed

== Bracket ==
First round March 6
8	Providence	49
9	Georgetown	46
7	Villanova	64
10	Xavier	56

Quarterfinals; March 7
1	DePaul	97
8	Providence	59
4	Seton Hall	83
5	Butler	57
2	Marquette	72
7	Villanova	59
3	St. John's	70
6	Creighton	54

Semifinals; March 8
1	DePaul	83
4	Seton Hall	80
2	Marquette	78
3	St. John's	55

Championship; March 9
1	DePaul	88
2	Marquette	74

* denotes overtime period

== See also ==
- 2020 Big East men's basketball tournament
