= 2019–20 DePaul Blue Demons women's basketball team =

Intercollegiate basketball season

2019–20 DePaul Blue Demons women's basketball
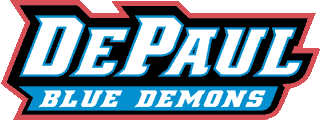

Big East Conference Tournament Champions
- Conference: Big East Conference

Ranking
- Coaches: No. 14
- AP: No. 15
- Record: 28–5 (15–3 Big East)
- Head coach: Doug Bruno (34th season)
- Assistant coaches: Jill M. Pizzotti; Lisa Ryckbosch; Candis Blankson
- Home arena: Wintrust Arena; McGrath-Phillips Arena

2019–20 Big East Conference women's basketball standings
	Conf.				Overall
Team	W		L	PCT	W		L	PCT
No. 15 DePaul	15	–	3	.833	28	–	5	.848
Marquette	13	–	5	.722	24	–	8	.750
Butler	11	–	7	.611	19	–	11	.633
Creighton	11	–	7	.611	19	–	11	.633
Seton Hall	11	–	7	.611	19	–	12	.613
St. John's	11	–	7	.611	19	–	12	.613
Villanova	11	–	7	.611	18	–	13	.581
Providence	3	–	15	.167	13	–	19	.406
Georgetown	2	–	16	.111	5	–	25	.167
Xavier	2	–	16	.111	3	–	27	.100
† 2020 Big East tournament winner As of April 1, 2020; Rankings from AP poll

The 2019–20 DePaul Blue Demons women's basketball team represented DePaul University during the 2019–20 NCAA Division I women's basketball season. The Blue Demons, led by thirty-fourth year head coach Doug Bruno, played their home games at the Wintrust Arena and the McGrath-Phillips Arena as members of the Big East Conference. They finished the season 28–5, 15–3 in Big East play to finish in first place. DePaul won the Big East Conference tournament championship game over Marquette, 88–74. The NCAA tournament was cancelled due to the COVID-19 outbreak.

== Previous season ==
They finished the season 26–8, 14–4 in Big East play to finish in second place. DePaul won the Big East Conference tournament championship game over Marquette, 74–73. They were upset in the first round by Missouri State in the NCAA women's tournament.

== Roster ==
2019–20 DePaul Blue Demons women's basketball team
Players
Coaches

Pos.	#	Name	Height	Year	Previous school	Hometown
G	1	Keke Rimmer	5 ft 10 in (1.78 m)	Fr	Proviso East	Maywood, IL
G	2	Maya Stovall	5 ft 7 in (1.7 m)	Fr	Parkway North	St. Louis, MO
G	3	Deja Church	5 ft 10 in (1.78 m)	Jr	Southfield A&T; Michigan	Southfield, MI
G	10	Lexi Held	5 ft 10 in (1.78 m)	So	Cooper	Burlington, KY
G	11	Sonya Morris	5 ft 10 in (1.78 m)	So	Incarnate Word	St. Charles, MO
F	14	Hannah Purcell	6 ft 0 in (1.83 m)	Fr	Annandale	Annadale, MN
G	15	Jolene Daninger	5 ft 7 in (1.7 m)	So	Andover	Andover, MN
G	20	Kelly Campbell	5 ft 10 in (1.78 m)	Sr	Saint John Vianney	Wall, NJ
F	22	Chante Stonewall	6 ft 1 in (1.85 m)	Sr	University	Normal, IL
G	23	Dee Bekelja	5 ft 8 in (1.73 m)	Jr	Solon	Solon, OH
F	24	Kayla Caudle	6 ft 1 in (1.85 m)	Fr	Vernon Hills	Vernon Hills, IL
G	30	Marisa Warren	5 ft 8 in (1.73 m)	Fr	Incarnate Word Academy	O'Fallon, MO
F	32	Dege Jean	6 ft 2 in (1.88 m)	Fr	Rich South	Richton Park, IL
F	42	Kiara Dallmann	6 ft 2 in (1.88 m)	Jr	Sheboygan North; Iowa Western	Sheboygan, WI

Head coach

- Doug Bruno (DePaul)

Assistant coach(es)

- Jill M. Pizzotti (Southeast Missouri State)
- Lisa Ryckbosch (Georgetown)
- Candis Blankson (DePaul)

Legend

- (C) Team captain
- (S) Suspended
- (I) Ineligible
- (W) Walk-on
- Injured
- Current redshirt

Roster
Last update: April 1, 2020

== Schedule ==
Date time, TV	Rank^{#}	Opponent^{#}	Result	Record	Site (attendance) city, state
Exhibition
October 29, 2019; 5:00 p.m.	No. 18	Saint Xavier	W 124–60	–	Wintrust Arena; Chicago, IL
Non-conference regular season
November 8, 2019*; 4:30 p.m.	No. 18	Miami (OH); Preseason WNIT	W 98–79	1–0	Wintrust Arena; Chicago, IL
November 11, 2019*; 7:00 p.m.	No. 18	Drexel; Preseason WNIT	W 81–57	2–0	McGrath-Phillips Arena (1,335); Chicago, IL
November 14, 2019*; 9:00 p.m.	No. 18	at No. 7 Oregon State; Preseason WNIT	L 77–98	2–1	Gill Coliseum (4,430); Corvallis, OR
November 22, 2019*; 11:00 a.m.	No. 19	Arkansas State; Maggie Dixon Classic	W 109–64	3–1	McGrath-Phillips Arena; Chicago, IL
November 23, 2019*; 3:30 p.m.	No. 19	No. 16 Miami (FL); Maggie Dixon Classic	W 89–83	4–1	McGrath-Phillips Arena (1,608); Chicago, IL
November 26, 2019*; 4:30 p.m.	No. 16	Milwaukee	W 94–65	5–1	Wintrust Arena; Chicago, IL
December 1, 2019*; 2:00 p.m., BTN+	No. 16	at Northwestern	W 70–68	6–1	Welsh–Ryan Arena (1,416); Evanston, IL
December 7, 2019*; 1:00 p.m., ESPN3	No. 16	at Green Bay	W 76–65	7–1	Kress Events Center (2,023); Green Bay, WI
December 11, 2019*; 5:30 p.m., ACCN	No. 16	at Notre Dame	W 105–94	8–1	Edmund P. Joyce Center (7,148); South Bend, IN
December 14, 2019*; 3:30 p.m.	No. 16	Alabama State	W 105–76	9–1	Wintrust Arena (4,620); Chicago, IL
December 16, 2019*; 7:00 p.m., FS1	No. 16	No. 2 Connecticut	L 74–84	9–2	Wintrust Arena (2,621); Chicago, IL
December 20, 2019*; 7:00 p.m.	No. 16	at Loyola-Chicago	W 83–76	10–2	Gentile Arena (756); Chicago, IL
Big East regular season
December 29, 2019; 4:00 p.m., BEDN	No. 16	Marquette	W 89–71	11–2 (1–0)	McGrath-Phillips Arena (2,321); Chicago, IL
January 3, 2020; 5:30 p.m., FS2	No. 16	at Providence	W 80–67	12–2 (2–0)	Alumni Hall (632); Providence, RI
January 5, 2020; 1:00 p.m., BEDN	No. 16	at Creighton	W 74–71	13–2 (3–0)	D. J. Sokol Arena (842); Omaha, NE
January 10, 2020; 7:00 p.m., BEDN	No. 15	Seton Hall	W 85–68	14–2 (4–0)	McGrath-Phillips Arena (1,653); Chicago, IL
January 12, 2020; 12:00 p.m., FS1	No. 15	St. John's	W 74–69	15–2 (5–0)	McGrath-Phillips Arena (1,622); Chicago, IL
January 17, 2020; 6:00 p.m., BEDN	No. 14	at Xavier	W 91–68	16–2 (6–0)	Cintas Center (481); Cincinnati, OH
January 19, 2020; 1:00 p.m., BEDN	No. 14	at Butler	W 80–65	17–2 (7–0)	Hinkle Fieldhouse (591); Indianapolis, IN
January 24, 2020; 7:00 p.m., BEDN	No. 11	Villanova	W 85–69	18–2 (8–0)	McGrath-Phillips Arena (1,506); Chicago, IL
January 26, 2020; 2:00 p.m., BEDN	No. 11	Georgetown	W 92–66	19–2 (9–0)	McGrath-Phillips Arena (1,899); Chicago, IL
January 31, 2020 p.m., BEDN	No. 11	Creighton	L 61–63	19–3 (9–1)	Wintrust Arena (1,664); Chicago, IL
February 2, 2020; 1:00 p.m., BEDN	No. 11	Providence	W 93–71	20–3 (10–1)	Wintrust Arena (1,650); Chicago, IL
February 7, 2020; 6:00 p.m., BEDN	No. 14	at St. John's	W 71–65	21–3 (11–1)	Carnesecca Arena (610); New York, NY
February 9, 2020; 12:00 p.m., BEDN	No. 14	at Seton Hall	W 86–76	22–3 (12–1)	Walsh Gymnasium (1,656); South Orange, NJ
February 14, 2020; 7:00 p.m., BEDN	No. 13	Butler	W 89–60	23–3 (13–1)	McGrath-Phillips Arena (1,779); Chicago, IL
February 16, 2020; 2:00 p.m., BEDN	No. 13	Xavier	W 97–65	24–3 (14–1)	McGrath-Phillips Arena (2,380); Chicago, IL
February 21, 2020; 6:00 p.m., BEDN	No. 12	at Georgetown	W 87–69	25–3 (15–1)	McDonough Gymnasium (291); Washington, D.C.
February 23, 2020; 12:00 p.m., BEDN	No. 12	at Villanova	L 58–76	25–4 (15–2)	Finneran Pavilion (2,421); Villanova, PA
March 1, 2020; 2:00 p.m., FS2	No. 16	at Marquette	L 83–90	25–5 (15–3)	Al McGuire Center (2,671); Milwaukee, WI
Big East Women's Tournament
March 7, 2020; 12:00 p.m., FS2	(1) No. 18	(8) Providence; Quarterfinals	W 97–59	26–5	Wintrust Arena; Chicago, IL
March 8, 2020; 5:00 p.m., FS1	(1) No. 18	Seton Hall; Semifinals	W 83–80	27–5	Wintrust Arena; Chicago, IL
March 9, 2020; 7:00 p.m., FS1	(1) No. 15	(2) Marquette; Final	W 88–74	28–5	Wintrust Arena (2,340); Chicago, IL
*Non-conference game. ^{#}Rankings from AP Poll. (#) Tournament seedings in parentheses. All times are in Central Time.

== Rankings ==
Ranking movements Legend: ██ Increase in ranking ██ Decrease in ranking т = Tied with team above or below
	Week																				
Poll	Pre	1	2	3	4	5	6	7	8	9	10	11	12	13	14	15	16	17	18	19	Final
AP	18т	18	19	16	16	16	16	16	16	16	15	14	11	11	14	13	12	16	18	15	15
Coaches	20	20	17	15	16	16	16	17	17	15	12	12	14	13	12	15	16	14	14	Not released	

^Coaches' Poll did not release a second poll at the same time as the AP.

== See also ==
2019–20 DePaul Blue Demons men's basketball team
