= 2020 American Athletic Conference women's basketball tournament =

- Classification: Division I
- Season: 2019–20
- Teams: 12
- Site: Mohegan Sun Arena; Uncasville, Connecticut
- Champions: UConn (7th title)
- Winning coach: Geno Auriemma (7th title)
- MVP: Megan Walker (UConn)
- Attendance: 30,102
- Television: ESPNU, ESPN2, ESPN3

2019–20 American Athletic Conference women's basketball standings
	Conf.				Overall
Team	W		L	PCT	W		L	PCT
No. 5 UConn	16	–	0	1.000	26	–	3	.897
Cincinnati	11	–	5	.688	20	–	9	.690
UCF	11	–	5	.688	19	–	9	.679
South Florida	10	–	6	.625	18	–	12	.600
Tulane	8	–	8	.500	13	–	16	.448
Temple	7	–	9	.438	15	–	14	.517
Wichita State	7	–	9	.438	15	–	14	.517
SMU	7	–	9	.438	13	–	15	.464
East Carolina	6	–	10	.375	9	–	20	.310
Houston	5	–	11	.313	12	–	18	.400
Memphis	4	–	12	.250	13	–	16	.448
Tulsa	4	–	12	.250	9	–	20	.310
† 2020 AAC tournament winner As of March 4, 2020; Rankings from AP poll

The 2020 American Athletic Conference women's basketball tournament was a postseason tournament that was held March 6–9, 2020, in the Mohegan Sun Arena in Uncasville, Connecticut. UConn won the tournament, their seventh consecutively, and earned an automatic bid to the 2020 NCAA Division I women's basketball tournament.

== Seeds ==
All the teams in the American Athletic Conference will qualify for the tournament. Teams are seeded based on conference record, and then a tiebreaker system will be used. Teams seeded 5–12 play in the opening round, and teams seeded 1–4 received a bye to the quarterfinals.

Seed	School	Conference	Overall	Tiebreaker
1	UConn	16–0	26–3	
2	UCF	11–5	20–9	2–0 vs. USF
3	Cincinnati	11–5	19–9	1–1 vs. USF
4	South Florida	10–6	18–12	
5	Tulane	8–8	13–16	
6	SMU	7–9	13–15	
7	Wichita State	7–9	15–14	
8	Temple	7–9	15–14	
9	East Carolina	6–10	9–20	
10	Houston	5–11	12–18	
11	Memphis	4–12	13–16	1–0 vs. Tulsa
12	Tulsa	4–12	9–20	0–1 vs. Memphis
‡ – American Athletic Conference regular season champions. # – Received a first-round bye in the conference tournament. Overall record are as of the end of the regular season.

== Schedule ==
All tournament games are nationally televised on an ESPN network:

Session	Game	Time*	Matchup^{#}	Score	Television	Attendance
First round – Friday, March 6
1	1	12:00 PM	No. 12 Tulsa vs. No. 5 Tulane	61–67	ESPN3	3,972
1	2	2:00 PM	No. 9 East Carolina vs. No. 8 Temple	57–67	ESPN3	3,972
2	3	6:00 PM	No. 10 Houston vs. No. 7 Wichita State	62–74	ESPN3	4,400
2	4	8:00 PM	No. 11 Memphis vs. No. 6 SMU	76–65	ESPN3	4,400
Quarterfinals – Saturday, March 7
3	5	12:00 PM	No. 5 Tulane vs. No. 4 USF	50–64	ESPN3	5,763
3	6	2:00 PM	No. 8 Temple vs. No. 1 UConn	61–94	ESPN3	5,763
4	7	6:00 PM	No. 7 Wichita State vs. No. 2 UCF	32–65	ESPN3	4,860
4	8	8:00 PM	No. 11 Memphis vs. No. 3 Cincinnati	52–94	ESPN3	4,860
Semifinals – Sunday, March 8
5	9	4:00 PM	No. 4 USF vs. No. 1 UConn	38-79	ESPN2	5,677
5	10	6:30 PM	No. 2 UCF vs. No. 3 Cincinnati	51–57	ESPNU	5,677
Championship – Monday, March 9
6	11	7:00 PM	No. 1 UConn vs. No. 3 Cincinnati	87–53	ESPN2	5,430
*Game times in ET. #-Rankings denote tournament seeding.

== Bracket ==
First round Friday, March 6
8	Temple	67
9	East Carolina	57
5	Tulane	67
12	Tulsa	61
7	Wichita St.	72
10	Houston	64
6	SMU	65
11	Memphis	76

Quarterfinals; Saturday, March 7
1	UConn	94
8	Temple	61
4	South Florida	64
5	Tulane	50
2	UCF	65
7	Wichita State	32
3	Cincinnati	94
11	Memphis	52

Semifinals; Sunday, March 8
1	UConn	79
4	South Florida	38
2	UCF	51
3	Cincinnati	57

Championship game Monday, March 9
1	UConn	87
3	Cincinnati	53

Note: * denotes overtime
