= 2019–20 UConn Huskies women's basketball team =

Intercollegiate basketball season

2019–20 UConn Huskies women's basketball

AAC regular season champions AAC Tournament champions
- Conference: American Athletic Conference

Ranking
- Coaches: No. 4
- AP: No. 5
- Record: 29–3 (16–0 The American)
- Head coach: Geno Auriemma (35th season)
- Associate head coach: Chris Dailey (35th season)
- Assistant coaches: Shea Ralph (12th season); Jasmine Lister (2nd season)
- Home arena: Harry A. Gampel Pavilion; XL Center

2019–20 American Athletic Conference women's basketball standings
	Conf.				Overall
Team	W		L	PCT	W		L	PCT
No. 5 UConn	16	–	0	1.000	26	–	3	.897
Cincinnati	11	–	5	.688	20	–	9	.690
UCF	11	–	5	.688	19	–	9	.679
South Florida	10	–	6	.625	18	–	12	.600
Tulane	8	–	8	.500	13	–	16	.448
Temple	7	–	9	.438	15	–	14	.517
Wichita State	7	–	9	.438	15	–	14	.517
SMU	7	–	9	.438	13	–	15	.464
East Carolina	6	–	10	.375	9	–	20	.310
Houston	5	–	11	.313	12	–	18	.400
Memphis	4	–	12	.250	13	–	16	.448
Tulsa	4	–	12	.250	9	–	20	.310
† 2020 AAC tournament winner As of March 4, 2020; Rankings from AP poll

The 2019–20 UConn Huskies women's basketball team represented the University of Connecticut (UConn) during the 2019–20 NCAA Division I women's basketball season. The Huskies, led by Hall of Fame head coach Geno Auriemma in his 35th season at UConn, split their home games between Harry A. Gampel Pavilion and the XL Center and were in their seventh and final season as members of the American Athletic Conference (The American).

UConn had a record of 26–3 during the regular season. They went 16–0 in the AAC and were the conference regular season champions. Then, they won the AAC tournament. UConn received an automatic bid to the 2020 NCAA Division I women's basketball tournament, but the tournament was cancelled due to the COVID-19 pandemic. The team finished the season ranked number 5 in the AP poll.

The Huskies left The American to join several of their former conference mates in the Big East Conference in July 2020.

== Media ==
Every UConn women's game was televised. Excluding exhibitions, most Huskies games aired on SNY, an ESPN network, or a CBS network. Exhibition games and games that aired on SNY were also streamed on Husky Vision. Every game was broadcast on the UConn IMG Sports Network with an extra audio broadcast available online to listen to through Husky Vision.

== Off-season ==
=== Departures ===
Name	Number	Pos.	Height	Year	Hometown	Reason for departure
Mikayla Coombs	4	G	5'8"	Sophomore	Buford, GA	Transferred to Georgia
Napheesa Collier	24	F	6'1"	Senior	O'Fallon, MO	Graduated / 2019 WNBA draft
Katie Lou Samuelson	33	G/F	6'3"	Senior	Huntington Beach, CA	Graduated / 2019 WNBA draft
Alexis Gordon	34	G/F	6'0"	Sophomore	Fort Worth, TX	Transferred at midseason to Texas Tech

=== Incoming transfers ===
Name	Number	Pos.	Height	Year	Hometown	Previous school
Evelyn Adebayo	14	F	6'1"	RS Senior	London, England	Transferred from Murray State. Was eligible to play immediately since Adebayo graduated from Murray State.
Evina Westbrook	22	G	6'0"	Junior	Salem, OR	Transferred from Tennessee. Under NCAA transfer rules, Westbrook sat out the 2019–20 season, and had two years of remaining eligibility starting in 2020–21.

=== Recruits ===
College recruiting information
Name	Hometown	School	Height	Weight	Commit date
Aubrey Griffin; W	Ossining, NY	Ossining Senior School	6 ft 1 in (1.85 m)	N/A	
Aubrey Griffin; W	Recruit ratings: ESPN: (98)				
Overall recruit ranking:
Note: In many cases, Scout, Rivals, 247Sports, On3, and ESPN may conflict in their listings of height and weight.; In these cases, the average was taken. ESPN grades are on a 100-point scale.; Sources: "2019 Player Commits". ESPN. Archived from the original on September 19, 2019.

== Roster ==
2019–20 UConn Huskies women's basketball team
Players
Coaches

Pos.	#	Name	Height	Year	Previous school	Hometown
F	3	Megan Walker	6 ft 1 in (1.85 m)	Jr	Monacan	Chesterfield, VA
G	5	Crystal Dangerfield	5 ft 5 in (1.65 m)	Sr	Blackman	Murfreesboro, TN
G	10	Molly Bent	5 ft 9 in (1.75 m)	Sr	Tabor Academy	Centerville, MA
G	13	Christyn Williams	5 ft 11 in (1.8 m)	So	Central Arkansas Christian	Little Rock, AR
F	14	Evelyn Adebayo	6 ft 1 in (1.85 m)	RS Sr	Murray State	London, England
F	20	Olivia Nelson-Ododa	6 ft 5 in (1.96 m)	So	Winder-Barrow	Winder, GA
G	22	Evina Westbrook (redshirt)	6 ft 0 in (1.83 m)	Jr	Tennessee	Salem, OR
G	24	Anna Makurat	6 ft 1 in (1.85 m)	Fr	Sport Championship School	Sierakowice, Poland
F	25	Kyla Irwin (injured)	6 ft 2 in (1.88 m)	Sr	State College	State College, PA
F	32	Batouly Camara	6 ft 2 in (1.88 m)	RS Sr	Kentucky	New York, NY
G	44	Aubrey Griffin	6 ft 1 in (1.85 m)	Fr	Ossining	Ossining, NY

Head coach

- Geno Auriemma (West Chester)

Assistant coach(es)

- Chris Dailey (Rutgers)
- Shea Ralph (Connecticut)
- Jasmine Lister (Vanderbilt)

Legend

- (C) Team captain
- (S) Suspended
- (I) Ineligible
- (W) Walk-on
- Injured
- Current redshirt

Roster

== Schedule ==
Date time, TV	Rank^{#}	Opponent^{#}	Result	Record	High points	High rebounds	High assists	Site (attendance) city, state
Exhibition
November 3, 2019*; 1:00 pm, HuskyVision	No. 5	Jefferson	W 103–40		28 – Walker	11 – Nelson-Ododa	8 – Dangerfield	Harry A. Gampel Pavilion (5,328); Storrs, CT
November 6, 2019*; 7:00 pm, HuskyVision	No. 5	Trevecca Nazarene	W 99–54		28 – Walker	8 – Walker	5 – Nelson-Ododa	XL Center (6,205); Hartford, CT
January 27, 2020*; 7:00 pm, ESPN2	No. 4	United States	L 64–79		22 – Walker	7 – Walker	4 – Dangerfield	XL Center (13,919); Hartford, CT
Regular season
November 10, 2019*; 1:00 pm, SNY	No. 5	California	W 72–61	1–0	24 – Williams	13 – Nelson-Ododa	4 – Nelson-Ododa	Harry A. Gampel Pavilion (9,294); Storrs, CT
November 13, 2019*; 7:00 pm, SECN	No. 4	at Vanderbilt	W 64–51	2–0	25 – Walker	12 – Nelson-Ododa	5 – Makurat	Memorial Gymnasium (2,961); Nashville, TN
November 17, 2019; 1:00 pm, SNY	No. 4	at Temple	W 83–54	3–0 (1–0)	19 – Williams	10 – Nelson-Ododa	7 – Makurat	Liacouras Center (3,278); Philadelphia, PA
November 19, 2019*; 7:00 pm, CBSSN	No. 4	Virginia	W 83–44	4–0	19 – Walker	9 – Walker	5 – Tied	XL Center (7,728); Hartford, CT
November 24, 2019*; 3:00 pm, ESPN	No. 4	at Ohio State	W 73–62	5–0	23 – Dangerfield	12 – Nelson-Ododa	6 – Dangerfield	Value City Arena (8,909); Columbus, OH
November 26, 2019*; 7:00 pm, ESPN+	No. 4	at Dayton	W 75–37	6–0	23 – Walker	12 – Walker	6 – Irwin	UD Arena (4,348); Dayton, OH
December 5, 2019*; 6:30 pm, FS1	No. 4	at Seton Hall	W 92–78	7–0	29 – Walker	12 – Griffin	5 – Irwin	Walsh Gymnasium (1,656); South Orange, NJ
December 8, 2019*; 4:00 pm, ESPN	No. 4	Notre Dame; Jimmy V Classic/Rivalry	W 81–57	8–0	26 – Walker	13 – Walker	5 – Dangerfield	Harry A. Gampel Pavilion (10,167); Storrs, CT
December 16, 2019*; 8:00 pm, FS1	No. 2	at No. 16 DePaul	W 84–74	9–0	22 – Tied	13 – Walker	7 – Walker	Wintrust Arena (2,621); Chicago, IL
December 22, 2019*; 4:00 pm, CBSSN	No. 2	vs. Oklahoma; Hall of Fame Holiday Showcase	W 97–53	10–0	27 – Nelson-Ododa	15 – Tied	6 – Dangerfield	Mohegan Sun Arena (7,238); Uncasville, CT
January 2, 2020; 7:00 pm, SNY	No. 1	Wichita State	W 83–55	11–0 (2–0)	22 – Dangerfield	9 – Nelson-Ododa	6 – Williams	XL Center (7,550); Hartford, CT
January 5, 2020; 4:00 pm, SNY	No. 1	at SMU	W 80–42	12–0 (3–0)	21 – Williams	10 – Nelson-Ododa	8 – Dangerfield	Moody Coliseum (2,310); University Park, TX
January 9, 2020*; 7:00 pm, ESPN	No. 1	No. 6 Baylor	L 58–74	12–1	21 – Williams	9 – Williams	3 – Walker	XL Center (12,415); Harford, CT
January 11, 2020; 1:00 pm, SNY	No. 1	Houston	W 91–51	13–1 (4–0)	22 – Walker	7 – 3 tied	5 – Williams	XL Center (10,868); Hartford, CT
January 14, 2020; 8:00 pm, SNY	No. 4	at Memphis	W 68–56	14–1 (5–0)	24 – Dangerfield	9 – Tied	3 – 3 tied	Elma Roane Fieldhouse (1,027); Memphis, TN
January 16, 2020; 6:00 pm, SNY	No. 4	at UCF	W 59–52	15–1 (6–0)	19 – Walker	12 – Nelson-Ododa	5 – Dangerfield	Addition Financial Arena (5,175); Orlando, FL
January 19, 2020; 12:00 pm, SNY	No. 4	Tulsa	W 92–34	16–1 (7–0)	24 – Walker	7 – Nelson-Ododa	5 – Makurat	Harry A. Gampel Pavilion (8,240); Storrs, CT
January 23, 2020*; 7:00 pm, ESPN	No. 3	No. 23 Tennessee; Rivalry	W 60–45	17–1	14 – Dangerfield	8 – Makurat	4 – Makurat	XL Center (13,659); Harford, CT
January 25, 2020; 12:00 pm, SNY	No. 3	at East Carolina	W 98–42	18–1 (8–0)	26 – Williams	12 – Walker	5 – Tied	Williams Arena (2,241); Greenville, NC
January 30, 2020; 7:00 pm, SNY	No. 4	Cincinnati	W 80–50	19–1 (9–0)	24 – Dangerfield	11 – Walker	5 – Dangerfield	Harry A. Gampel Pavilion (8,026); Storrs, CT
February 3, 2020*; 7:00 pm, ESPN2	No. 4	No. 3 Oregon	L 56–74	19–2	19 – Dangerfield	7 – Walker	6 – Nelson-Ododa	Harry A. Gampel Pavilion (10,167); Storrs, CT
February 7, 2020; 7:00 pm, SNY	No. 4	Memphis	W 94–55	20–2 (10–0)	26 – Walker	11 – Walker	11 – Makurat	Harry A. Gampel Pavilion (7,306); Storrs, CT
February 10, 2020*; 7:00 pm, ESPN2	No. 5	at No. 1 South Carolina	L 52–70	20–3	28 – Dangerfield	9 – Nelson-Ododa	4 – Nelson-Ododa	Colonial Life Arena (18,000); Columbia, SC
February 16, 2020; 2:00 pm, SNY	No. 5	at South Florida	W 67–47	21–3 (11–0)	21 – Walker	8 – Nelson-Ododa	5 – Dangerfield	Yuengling Center (6,044); Tampa, FL
February 19, 2020; 7:00 pm, SNY	No. 6	Tulane	W 74–31	22–3 (12–0)	18 – Tied	11 – Nelson-Ododa	6 – Williams	XL Center (8,446); Hartford, CT
February 22, 2020; 1:00 pm, SNY	No. 6	UCF	W 66–53	23–3 (13–0)	20 – Walker	11 – Walker	6 – Walker	Harry A. Gampel Pavilion (10,167); Storrs, CT
February 26, 2020; 7:00 pm, SNY	No. 6	at Cincinnati	W 105–58	24–3 (14–0)	26 – Williams	8 – Tied	6 – Tied	Fifth Third Arena (5,607); Cincinnati, OH
February 29, 2020; 3:00 pm, SNY	No. 6	at Houston	W 92–40	25–3 (15–0)	21 – Walker	9 – Tied	7 – Dangerfield	Fertitta Center (2,936); Houston, TX
March 2, 2020; 7:00 pm, ESPN2	No. 5	South Florida	W 80–39	26–3 (16–0)	23 – Walker	9 – Nelson-Ododa	5 – Tied	XL Center (9,338); Hartford, CT
AAC Tournament
March 7, 2020; 2:00 pm, ESPN3	(1) No. 5	vs. (8) Temple; Quarterfinals	W 94–61	27–3	22 – Dangerfield	16 – Griffin	8 – Makurat	Mohegan Sun Arena (5,763); Uncasville, CT
March 8, 2020; 4:00 pm, ESPN2	(1) No. 5	vs. (4) South Florida; Semifinals	W 79–38	28–3	21 – Walker	7 – Tied	4 – Makurat	Mohegan Sun Arena (5,677); Uncasville, CT
March 9, 2020; 7:00 pm, ESPN2	(1) No. 5	vs. (3) Cincinnati; Championship	W 87–53	29–3	26 – Walker	11 – Nelson-Ododa	8 – Makurat	Mohegan Sun Arena (5,430); Uncasville, CT
*Non-conference game. ^{#}Rankings from AP poll. (#) Tournament seedings in parentheses. All times are in EST.

== Rankings ==
Regular season polls
Poll	Pre- Season	Week 2	Week 3	Week 4	Week 5	Week 6	Week 7	Week 8	Week 9	Week 10	Week 11	Week 12	Week 13	Week 14	Week 15	Week 16	Week 17	Week 18	Week 19	Final
AP	5	4	4	4	4 (2)	2 (1)	2 (1)	1 (19)	1 (19)	1 (19)	4	3	4	4	5	6	6	5	5	5
Coaches	4	4^	4	4	4 (2)	2 (3)	2 (3)	1 (21)	1 (22)	1 (24)	5	5	5	6	6	5	4	4	4	4

Legend
	Increase in ranking
	Decrease in ranking
	Not ranked previous week
RV	Received votes
NR	Not ranked
( )	Number of first place votes

^ Coaches did not release a Week 2 poll

== See also ==
- 2019–20 UConn Huskies men's basketball team
