= 2019–20 South Florida Bulls women's basketball team =

Intercollegiate basketball season

2019–20 South Florida Bulls women's basketball
- Conference: American Athletic Conference
- Record: 18–12 (10–6 The American)
- Head coach: Jose Fernandez (20th season)
- Assistant coaches: Michele Woods-Baxter; Jesyka Burks-Wiley; Danny Hughes
- Home arena: Yuengling Center

2019–20 American Athletic Conference women's basketball standings
	Conf.				Overall
Team	W		L	PCT	W		L	PCT
No. 5 UConn	16	–	0	1.000	26	–	3	.897
Cincinnati	11	–	5	.688	20	–	9	.690
UCF	11	–	5	.688	19	–	9	.679
South Florida	10	–	6	.625	18	–	12	.600
Tulane	8	–	8	.500	13	–	16	.448
Temple	7	–	9	.438	15	–	14	.517
Wichita State	7	–	9	.438	15	–	14	.517
SMU	7	–	9	.438	13	–	15	.464
East Carolina	6	–	10	.375	9	–	20	.310
Houston	5	–	11	.313	12	–	18	.400
Memphis	4	–	12	.250	13	–	16	.448
Tulsa	4	–	12	.250	9	–	20	.310
† 2020 AAC tournament winner As of March 4, 2020; Rankings from AP poll

The 2019–20 South Florida Bulls women's basketball team represented the University of South Florida in the 2019–20 NCAA Division I women's basketball season. The Bulls were coached by Jose Fernandez in his twentieth season and played their home games at Yuengling Center in Tampa, Florida. This was USF's seventh season as a member of the American Athletic Conference, known as The American or AAC. They finished the season 18–12, 10–6 in AAC play to finish in fourth place. They advanced to the semifinals of the American Athletic Conference women's tournament, where they lost to Connecticut.

== Media ==
All Bulls games aired on Bullscast Radio or CBS 1010 AM. Conference home games rotated between ESPN3, AAC Digital, and Bullscast. Road games were typically streamed on the opponent's website, though some conference road games also appeared on ESPN3 or AAC Digital.

== Roster ==
2019–20 South Florida Bulls women's basketball team
Players
Coaches

Pos.	#	Name	Height	Year	Previous school	Hometown
G	0	Enna Penhadzic	5 ft 9 in (1.75 m)	Jr	Horsens Statsskole	Denmark
G	1	Maria Alvarez	5 ft 7 in (1.7 m)	Fr	Miami Country Day	Bal Harbour, FL
G	2	Mihaela Lazic	5 ft 6 in (1.68 m)	Fr	Klasicna Gimnazija	Slavonski Brod, Croatia
G	3	Sydni Harvey	5 ft 10 in (1.78 m)	So	Brentwood Academy	Nashville, TN
G	4	Elisa Pinzan	5 ft 8 in (1.73 m)	So	Istituto Tecnico Algarotti Venezia	Murano, Italy
G	5	Elena Tsineke	5 ft 7 in (1.7 m)	Fr	Hellenic College of Thessaloniki	Thessaloniki, GR
F	12	Cristina Bermejo	6 ft 1 in (1.85 m)	Fr	Ins Sant Just Desvern	Sant Just Desvern, Spain
F	20	Bethy Mununga	6 ft 0 in (1.83 m)	Jr	Institut Sainte- Marie Jambes	Zellik, Belgium
F	21	Shea Leverett	6 ft 2 in (1.88 m)	RS Jr	South Effingham HS	Rincon, GA
F	22	Kristyna Brabencova	6 ft 0 in (1.83 m)	Fr	KŠPA KLADNO	Brno, Czech Republic
C	23	Tamara Henshaw	6 ft 1 in (1.85 m)	Sr	Flagler Palm Coast HS	Palm Coast, FL
C	31	Beatriz Jordao	6 ft 3 in (1.91 m)	So	Quinta dos Lombos	Pombal, Portugal
F	34	Silvia Serrat	6 ft 1 in (1.85 m)	Jr		Banyoles, Spain

Head coach

- Jose Fernandez (Miami-Dade Kendall)

Assistant coach(es)

- Michele Woods-Baxter (St. John Fisher College)
- Jesyka Burks-Wiley (Boston University)
- Danny Hughes (TCU)

Legend

- (C) Team captain
- (S) Suspended
- (I) Ineligible
- (W) Walk-on
- Injured
- Current redshirt

Roster
Last update: 03/09/2020

== Schedule ==
Date time, TV	Rank^{#}	Opponent^{#}	Result	Record	Site (attendance) city, state
Non-conference regular season
11/05/2019*; 5:30 pm		Jacksonville	W 70–39	1–0	Yuengling Center; Tampa, FL
11/08/2019*; 7:00 pm		No. 15 Texas	W 64–57	2–0	Yuengling Center (2,289); Tampa, FL
11/15/2018*; 7:00 pm		Howard	W 82–53	3–0	Yuengling Center (2,006); Tampa, FL
11/15/2019*; 11:00 am		VCU	W 77–55	4–0	Yuengling Center (3,520); Tampa, FL
11/19/2019*; 8:00 pm		at No. 2 Baylor	L 46–58	4–1	Ferrell Center (7,485); Waco, TX
11/24/2019*; 2:00 pm		Saint Francis (PA)	W 62–23	5–1	Yuengling Center (2,076); Tampa, FL
11/28/2019*; 11:00 am		vs. South Dakota State; Cancun Challenge	L 50–61	5–2	Hard Rock Hotel Riviera Maya (235); Cancun, MEX
11/29/2019*; 1:30 pm		vs. Florida Gulf Coast; Cancun Challenge	L 77–81	5–3	Hard Rock Hotel Riviera Maya (198); Cancun, MEX
11/30/2019*; 11:00 am		vs. Notre Dame; Cancun Challenge	L 51–67	5–4	Hard Rock Hotel Riviera Maya (174); Cancun, MEX
12/06/2019*; 5:30 pm		Alabama State	W 80–29	6–4	Yuengling Center; Tampa, FL
12/15/2019*; 1:00 pm		Idaho	W 67–64	7–4	Yuengling Center; Tampa, FL
12/19/2019*; 7:00 pm		vs. Mississippi State; Duel in the Desert	L 61–86	7–5	Cox Pavilion (641); Las Vegas, NV
12/21/2018*; 3:00 pm		vs. UNLV; Duel in the Desert	L 51–61	7–6	Cox Pavilion; Las Vegas, NV
12/30/2018*; 5:30 pm		Brown	W 70–60	8–6	Yuengling Center (2,062); Tampa, FL
AAC regular season
01/05/2020; 2:00 pm		Cincinnati	W 76–68	9–6 (1–0)	Yuengling Center (2,204); Tampa, FL
01/12/2020; 6:00 pm		at Tulsa	W 68–52	10–6 (2–0)	Donald W. Reynolds Center (998); Tulsa, OK
01/16/2020; 7:00 pm		at Temple	L 66–69	10–7 (2–1)	McGonigle Hall (1,079); Philadelphia, PA
01/19/2019; 3:00 pm		UCF; War on I-4	L 57–64	10–8 (2–2)	Yuengling Center (3,017); Tampa, FL
01/22/2020; 7:30 pm		at Wichita State	W 56–50	11–8 (3–2)	Charles Koch Arena (1,556); Wichita, KS
01/25/2020; 2:00 pm		Tulane	W 63–56	12–8 (4–2)	Yuengling Center (2,207); Tampa, FL
01/29/2020; 7:00 pm		Houston	W 74–45	13–8 (5–2)	Yuengling Center (2,262); Tampa, FL
02/02/2020; 12:00 pm		at Cincinnati	L 55–60	13–9 (5–3)	Fifth Third Arena (1,141); Cincinnati, OH
02/09/2020; 12:00 pm		Temple	W 99–51	14–9 (6–3)	Yuengling Center (2,209); Tampa, FL
02/13/2020; 8:00 pm		at Tulane	W 53–43	15–9 (7–3)	Devlin Fieldhouse (621); New Orleans, LA
02/16/2019; 2:00 pm		No. 5 Connecticut	L 47–67	15–10 (7–4)	Yuengling Center (6,044); Tampa, FL
02/19/2020; 6:00 pm		at UCF	L 48–56	15–11 (7–5)	Addition Financial Arena (3,992); Orlando, FL
02/22/2020; 5:00 pm		at Memphis	W 68–47	16–11 (8–5)	Elma Roane Fieldhouse (551); Memphis, TN
02/25/2020; 7:00 pm		East Carolina	W 81–52	17–11 (9–5)	Yuengling Center (2,011); Tampa, FL
02/29/2020; 7:00 pm		SMU	W 85–62	18–11 (10–5)	Yuengling Center (2,414); Tampa, FL
03/02/2020; 7:00 pm		No. 5 Connecticut	L 39–80	18–12 (10–6)	XL Center (9,338); Hartford, CT
AAC Women's Tournament
03/07/2019; 12:00 pm, ESPN3	(4)	vs. (5) Tulane; Quarterfinals	W 64–50	19–12	Mohegan Sun Arena; Uncasville, CT
03/08/2020; 4:00 pm, ESPN2	(4)	vs. (1) No. 5 Connecticut; Semifinals	L 38–79	19–13	Mohegan Sun Arena; Uncasville, CT
*Non-conference game. ^{#}Rankings from AP Poll. (#) Tournament seedings in parentheses. All times are in EST.

== Rankings ==
+ Regular season polls	Poll	Pre- Season	Week 2	Week 3	Week 4	Week 5	Week 6	Week 7	Week 8	Week 9	Week 10	Week 11	Week 12	Week 13	Week 14	Week 15	Week 16	Week 17	Week 18	Week 19	Final
AP																				N/A	
Coaches																					

Legend
	Increase in ranking
	Decrease in ranking
	Not ranked previous week
(RV)	Received votes

^Coaches did not release a Week 2 poll.

== See also ==
- 2019–20 South Florida Bulls men's basketball team
