= 2020 CAA women's basketball tournament =

- Classification: Division I
- Season: 2019–20
- Teams: 10
- Site: Schar Center; Elon, North Carolina
- Television: FloHoops
- CAA women's basketball tournaments

2019–20 CAA women's basketball standings
	Conf.				Overall
Team	W		L	PCT	W		L	PCT
Drexel	16	–	2	.889	23	–	7	.767
James Madison	16	–	2	.889	25	–	4	.862
William & Mary	12	–	6	.667	21	–	8	.724
Towson	9	–	9	.500	14	–	15	.483
Northeastern	9	–	9	.500	13	–	16	.448
Elon	8	–	10	.444	12	–	17	.414
Delaware	8	–	10	.444	14	–	16	.467
Charleston	6	–	12	.333	13	–	17	.433
UNC Wilmington	6	–	12	.333	10	–	20	.333
Hofstra	0	–	18	.000	3	–	27	.100
† 2020 CAA tournament winner Rankings from AP poll

The 2020 Colonial Athletic Association women's basketball tournament was a postseason women's basketball tournament for the Colonial Athletic Association for the 2019–20 NCAA Division I women's basketball season. The tournament was scheduled to be held from March 11–14, 2020 at the Schar Center in Elon, North Carolina. The champion would have received the CAA's automatic bid to the NCAA tournament. On March 12, the NCAA announced that the tournament was cancelled due to the coronavirus pandemic.

== Seeds ==
All 10 CAA teams are expected to participate in the tournament. Teams will be seeded by conference record, with a tiebreaker system used to seed teams with identical conference records. The top six teams will receive a bye to the quarterfinals.

Seed	School	Conf.	Tiebreaker 1	Tiebreaker 2
1	Drexel	16-2	2–0 vs. Towson	
2	James Madison	16-2	1–1 vs. Towson	
3	William & Mary	12-6		
4	Towson	9-9		
5	Northeastern	9-9		
6	Delaware	8-10		
7	Elon	8-10		
8	Charleston	6-12		
9	UNCW	6-12		
10	Hofstra	0-18		

== Schedule ==
Session	Game	Time*	Matchup	Score	Television
First round – Wednesday, March 11
1	1	2:00 pm	No. 9 UNCW vs No. 8 Charleston	69–55	FloHoops
1	2	4:30 pm	No. 10 Hofstra vs No. 7 Elon	71–51	FloHoops
Quarterfinals – Thursday, March 12
2	3		Winner of Game 1 vs No. 1 Drexel	Cancelled	
2	4		No. 5 Northeastern vs No. 4 Towson	Cancelled	
3	5		Winner of Game 2 vs No. 2 James Madison	Cancelled	
3	6		No. 6 Delaware vs No. 3 William & Mary	Cancelled	
Semifinals – Friday, March 13
4	7		Winner of Game 3 vs Winner of Game 4	Cancelled	
4	8		Winner of Game 5 vs Winner of Game 6	Cancelled	
Championship – Saturday, March 14
5	9		Winner of Game 7 vs Winner of Game 8	Cancelled	
*Game times in ET. Rankings denote tournament seed

== Bracket ==
First round Wednesday, March 11; FloHoops
8	UNCW	69
9	Charleston	55
7	Elon	71
10	Hofstra	51

Quarterfinals; Thursday, March 12; FloHoops
1	Drexel
9	UNCW
4	Towson
5	Northeastern
2	James Madison
7	Elon
3	William & Mary
6	Delaware

Semifinals; Friday, March 13; FloHoops

Final; Saturday, March 14; FloHoops

* denotes overtime game

== See also ==
- 2020 CAA men's basketball tournament
