= 2019–20 James Madison Dukes women's basketball team =

Intercollegiate basketball season

2019–20 James Madison Dukes women's basketball

CAA regular-season co-champions
- Conference: Colonial Athletic Association
- Record: 25–4 (16–2 CAA)
- Head coach: Sean O'Regan (4th season)
- Assistant coaches: Ian Caskill; Ashley Langford; Mike Karon
- Home arena: JMU Convocation Center

2019–20 CAA women's basketball standings
	Conf.				Overall
Team	W		L	PCT	W		L	PCT
Drexel	16	–	2	.889	23	–	7	.767
James Madison	16	–	2	.889	25	–	4	.862
William & Mary	12	–	6	.667	21	–	8	.724
Towson	9	–	9	.500	14	–	15	.483
Northeastern	9	–	9	.500	13	–	16	.448
Elon	8	–	10	.444	12	–	17	.414
Delaware	8	–	10	.444	14	–	16	.467
Charleston	6	–	12	.333	13	–	17	.433
UNC Wilmington	6	–	12	.333	10	–	20	.333
Hofstra	0	–	18	.000	3	–	27	.100
† 2020 CAA tournament winner Rankings from AP poll

The 2019–20 James Madison Dukes women's basketball team represented James Madison University during the 2019–20 NCAA Division I women's basketball season. The Dukes, led by fourth-year head coach Sean O'Regan, played their home games at the James Madison University Convocation Center as members of the Colonial Athletic Association (CAA). They finished the season 25–4, 16–2 in CAA play, to win a share of the CAA regular-season title. They received the number two seed in the CAA women's tournament, and were moments from taking the floor against Elon when the tournament was cancelled due to the COVID-19 pandemic.

== Roster ==
2019–20 James Madison Dukes women's basketball team
Players
Coaches

Pos.	#	Name	Height	Year	Previous school	Hometown
G	0	Nikki Oppenheimer (redshirt)	5 ft 9 in (1.75 m)	So	Montini Catholic HS; Syracuse	Glenview, IL
G	2	Jaylin Carodine	5 ft 10 in (1.78 m)	So	St. John's College HS	Bowie, MD
G	3	Kamiah Smalls	5 ft 10 in (1.78 m)	Sr	Neumann Goretti HS	Philadelphia, PA
G	4	Madison Green	5 ft 6 in (1.68 m)	So	Millbrook HS	Winchester, VA
G	14	Eleanore Marciszewski	6 ft 0 in (1.83 m)	So	Dawson College	Sainte-Julie, QC
G	15	Lexie Barrier	5 ft 10 in (1.78 m)	Sr	Ironton HS	Ironton, OH
F	21	Rayne Tucker	6 ft 1 in (1.85 m)	Fr	Riverdale Baptist	New Carrollton, MD
G	25	Brianna Tinsley (redshirt)	5 ft 7 in (1.7 m)	So	St. Anne's-Belfield; Virginia	Madison, VA
G	30	Kiki Jefferson	6 ft 1 in (1.85 m)	Fr	Lancaster HS	Lancaster, PA
C	31	Kayla Cooper-Williams (redshirt)	6 ft 2 in (1.88 m)	RS Sr	C. D. Hylton HS	Dumfries, VA
F	41	Casey Irvine	6 ft 1 in (1.85 m)	So	Spotswood HS	Penn Laird, VA
F	42	Devon Merritt	6 ft 2 in (1.88 m)	Sr	Berks Catholic HS	Reading, PA
G	55	Jackie Benitez (redshirt)	5 ft 10 in (1.78 m)	Sr	Pocono Mountain West HS; Siena	Tobyhanna, PA

Head coach

- Sean O'Regan (James Madison)

Assistant coach(es)

- Ian Caskill (James Madison)
- Ashley Langford (Tulane)
- Mike Karon (Duke)

Legend

- (C) Team captain
- (S) Suspended
- (I) Ineligible
- (W) Walk-on
- Injured
- Current redshirt

Roster
Last update: December 25, 2022

== Schedule and results ==
Date time, TV	Rank^{#}	Opponent^{#}	Result	Record	High points	High rebounds	High assists	Site (attendance) city, state
Non-conference regular season
November 6, 2019*; 5:00 p.m.		Longwood	W 93–53	1–0	25 – Smalls	12 – Cooper-Williams	4 – Smalls	JMU Convocation Center (1,983); Harrisonburg, VA
November 9, 2019*; 7:00 p.m.		at Villanova	W 56–52	2–0	22 – Smalls	10 – Cooper-Williams	4 – Barrier	Finneran Pavilion (671); Villanova, PA
November 13, 2019*; 7:00 p.m.		No. 8 Maryland	L 68–70	2–1	16 – Jefferson	7 – Jefferson	4 – Green	JMU Convocation Center (2,628); Harrisonburg, VA
November 17, 2019*; 2:00 p.m.		St. John's	W 76–73	3–1	25 – Smalls	9 – tied	2 – tied	JMU Convocation Center (1,942); Harrisonburg, VA
November 21, 2019*; 7:00 p.m.		at Georgetown	W 66–59	4–1	21 – tied	7 – Carodine	3 – Smalls	McDonough Arena (471); Washington, D.C.
November 24, 2019*; 2:00 p.m.		Liberty	W 76–53	5–1	18 – Benitez	8 – Cooper-Williams	4 – tied	JMU Convocation Center (1,917); Harrisonburg, VA
November 30, 2019*; 2:00 p.m.		at Virginia; Cavalier Classic	L 49–55	5–2	16 – Smalls	7 – Cooper-Williams	2 – tied	John Paul Jones Arena (2913); Charlottesville, VA
December 1, 2019*; 1:00 p.m.		vs. UCF; Cavalier Classic	W 44–43	6–2	13 – Benitez	16 – Cooper-Williams	4 – Barrier	John Paul Jones Arena (277); Charlottesville, VA
December 17, 2019*; 7:00 p.m.		Delaware State	W 83–64	7–2	29 – Smalls	14 – Cooper-Williams	7 – Smalls	JMU Convocation Center (1,904); Harrisonburg, VA
December 20, 2019*; 7:00 p.m.		at George Washington	W 69–50	8–2	23 – Smalls	9 – Cooper-Williams	4 – tied	Charles E. Smith Center (452); Washington, D.C.
December 29, 2019*; 2:00 p.m.		Robert Morris	W 59–32	9–2	21 – Benitez	17 – Cooper-Williams	5 – Barrier	JMU Convocation Center (1948); Harrisonburg, VA
Conference regular season
January 3, 2020; 7:00 p.m.		William & Mary	W 84–70	10–2 (1–0)	24 – Smalls	12 – Tucker	5 – Green	JMU Convocation Center (1933); Harrisonburg, VA
January 5, 2020; 2:00 p.m.		Elon	W 61–48	11–2 (2–0)	24 – Smalls	12 – Smalls	2 – Jefferson	JMU Convocation Center (2018); Harrisonburg, VA
January 12, 2020; 2:00 p.m.		at Towson	L 75–76	11–3 (2–1)	26 – Smalls	17 – Cooper-Williams	4 – Jefferson	SECU Arena (484); Towson, MD
January 17, 2020; 7:00 p.m.		at UNC Wilmington	W 66–58	12–3 (3–1)	20 – Smalls	7 – Barrier	2 – tied	Trask Coliseum (705); Wilmington, NC
January 19, 2020; 1:00 p.m.		at College of Charleston	W 87–58	13–3 (4–1)	21 – Jefferson	12 – Jefferson	7 – Green	TD Arena (348); Charleston, SC
January 24, 2020; 7:00 p.m.		Hofstra	W 92–50	14–3 (5–1)	26 – Benitez	14 – Carodine	3 – tied	JMU Convocation Center (2212); Harrisonburg, VA
January 26, 2020; 2:00 p.m.		Northeastern	W 67–54	15–3 (6–1)	17 – Jefferson	9 – tied	4 – tied	JMU Convocation Center (2796); Harrisonburg, VA
January 31, 2020; 7:00 p.m.		at Delaware	W 60–39	16–3 (7–1)	18 – Smalls	12 – Smalls	3 – Jefferson	Bob Carpenter Center (916); Newark, DE
February 2, 2020; 2:00 p.m.		at Drexel	L 48–70	16–4 (7–2)	13 – Benitez	9 – Cooper-Williams	2 – Barrier	Daskalakis Athletic Center (768); Philadelphia, PA
February 9, 2020; 2:00 p.m.		Towson	W 81–39	17–4 (8–2)	24 – Smalls	10 – tied	5 – Smalls	JMU Convocation Center (3216); Harrisonburg, VA
February 14, 2020; 12:00 p.m.		College of Charleston	W 81–50	18–4 (9–2)	20 – Green	8 – tied	4 – Barrier	JMU Convocation Center (1851); Harrisonburg, VA
February 16, 2020; 2:00 p.m.		UNC Wilmington	W 76–52	19–4 (10–2)	21 – Jefferson	9 – tied	4 – Smalls	JMU Convocation Center (2243); Harrisonburg, VA
February 21, 2020; 7:00 p.m.		at Northeastern	W 86–64	20–4 (11–2)	25 – Smalls	7 – tied	5 – Smalls	Cabot Center (362); Boston, MA
February 23, 2020; 2:00 p.m.		at Hofstra	W 89–52	21–4 (12–2)	20 – Smalls	14 – Smalls	4 – Smalls	Hofstra Arena (376); Hempstead, NY
February 28, 2020; 7:00 p.m.		Drexel	W 69–39	22–4 (13–2)	15 – tied	15 – Cooper-Williams	4 – Smalls	JMU Convocation Center (2543); Harrisonburg, VA
March 1, 2020; 2:00 p.m.		Delaware	W 69–64	23–4 (14–2)	21 – Smalls	10 – Tucker	4 – Smalls	JMU Convocation Center (3844); Harrisonburg, VA
March 5, 2020; 7:00 p.m.		at Elon	W 61–58	24–4 (15–2)	24 – Smalls	8 – Smalls	3 – Smalls	Schar Center (563); Elon, NC
March 7, 2020; 2:00 p.m.		at William & Mary	W 67–53	25–4 (16–2)	16 – Benitez	7 – tied	4 – Jefferson	Kaplan Arena (752); Williamsburg, VA
CAA tournament
March 12, 2020; 5:00 p.m.	(2)	at (7) Elon; Quarterfinals	Cancelled due to the COVID-19 pandemic					Schar Center; Elon, NC
*Non-conference game. ^{#}Rankings from AP poll. (#) Tournament seedings in parentheses. All times are in Eastern.

== See also ==
- 2019–20 James Madison Dukes men's basketball team
