= 2019–20 Tulane Green Wave women's basketball team =

American college basketball season

2019–20 Tulane Green Wave women's basketball
- Conference: American Athletic Conference
- Record: 14–17 (8–8 The American)
- Head coach: Lisa Stockton (26th season)
- Assistant coaches: Alan Frey; Doshia Woods; Beth Dunkenberger
- Home arena: Devlin Fieldhouse

2019–20 American Athletic Conference women's basketball standings
	Conf.				Overall
Team	W		L	PCT	W		L	PCT
No. 5 UConn	16	–	0	1.000	26	–	3	.897
Cincinnati	11	–	5	.688	20	–	9	.690
UCF	11	–	5	.688	19	–	9	.679
South Florida	10	–	6	.625	18	–	12	.600
Tulane	8	–	8	.500	13	–	16	.448
Temple	7	–	9	.438	15	–	14	.517
Wichita State	7	–	9	.438	15	–	14	.517
SMU	7	–	9	.438	13	–	15	.464
East Carolina	6	–	10	.375	9	–	20	.310
Houston	5	–	11	.313	12	–	18	.400
Memphis	4	–	12	.250	13	–	16	.448
Tulsa	4	–	12	.250	9	–	20	.310
† 2020 AAC tournament winner As of March 4, 2020; Rankings from AP poll

The 2019–20 Tulane Green Wave women's basketball team represented Tulane University during the 2019–20 NCAA Division I women's basketball season. The Green Wave, led by twenty-sixth year head coach Lisa Stockton, played their home games at Devlin Fieldhouse and were sixth year members of the American Athletic Conference. They finished the season 14–17, 8–8 in AAC play to finish in fifth place. They defeated Tulsa in the first round of the American Athletic women's tournament to advance to the quarterfinals, where they lost to South Florida.

== Media ==
All Green Wave games will be broadcast on WRBH 88.3 FM. A video stream for all home games will be on Tulane All-Access, ESPN3, or AAC Digital. Road games will typically be streamed on the opponents website, though conference road games could also appear on ESPN3 or AAC Digital.

== Roster ==
2019–20 Tulane Green Wave women's basketball team
Players
Coaches

Pos.	#	Name	Height	Year	Previous school	Hometown
G	0	Arsula Clark	5 ft 9 in (1.75 m)	Jr	Douglasville HS; Louisiana–Monroe	Miami, FL
G	1	Kaila Anderson	5 ft 5 in (1.65 m)	Jr	University Lab	Kenner, LA
G	2	Erin Gutierrez	5 ft 9 in (1.75 m)	So	Nova	Pembroke Pines, FL
G	5	Kayla Manuirirangi	5 ft 8 in (1.73 m)	Sr	New Plymouth Girls'	Hawera, New Zealand
G	11	Salma Bates	5 ft 7 in (1.7 m)	Fr	John Curtis Christian	Kenner, LA
G	12	Sierra Cheatham	6 ft 0 in (1.83 m)	Jr	Clear Springs	Houston, TX
G	14	Dynah Jones	5 ft 9 in (1.75 m)	So	John Curtis	New Orleans, LA
F	15	Anijah Bates	6 ft 3 in (1.91 m)	Fr	Oak Ridge	Orlando, FL
F	21	Irina Parau	6 ft 1 in (1.85 m)	Fr	Nicolae Balcescu	Cluj-Napoca, Romania
F	23	Krystal Freeman	6 ft 0 in (1.83 m)	Jr	Pineville	Pineville, LA
F	24	Maddison Wells	6 ft 1 in (1.85 m)	Sr	Chain of Lakes Collegiate	Winter Haven, FL
F	30	Dene' Mimms	6 ft 5 in (1.96 m)	RS Fr	Warren Easton Charter	New Orleans, LA
F	42	Mia Heide	6 ft 3 in (1.91 m)	So	Austin	Austin, TX

Head coach

- Lisa Stockton (Wake Forest)

Assistant coach(es)

- Alan Frey (New Orleans)
- Doshia Woods (Western Illinois)
- Beth Dunkenberger (Randolph–Macon)

Legend

- (C) Team captain
- (S) Suspended
- (I) Ineligible
- (W) Walk-on
- Injured
- Current redshirt

Roster

== Schedule and results ==
Date time, TV	Rank^{#}	Opponent^{#}	Result	Record	Site (attendance) city, state
Exhibition
10/30/2019*; 7:00 pm		Loyola (New Orleans)	W 61–38		Devlin Fieldhouse (592); New Orleans, LA
Non-conference regular season
11/05/2019*; 7:00 pm		Jackson State	W 82–46	1–0	Devlin Fieldhouse (541); New Orleans, LA
11/10/2019*; 4:00 pm		at Washington	W 64–62	2–0	Alaska Airlines Arena (1,239); Seattle, WA
11/14/2019*; 7:00 pm, CST/ESPN3		Middle Tennessee	L 62–64	2–1	Devlin Fieldhouse (514); New Orleans, LA
11/17/2019*; 4:00 pm		LSU	L 54–59	2–2	Devlin Fieldhouse (720); New Orleans, LA
11/22/2019*; 12:00 pm		Central Arkansas	W 65–38	3–2	Devlin Fieldhouse (1,307); New Orleans, LA
11/24/2019*; 4:00 pm		Alabama	L 56–66	3–3	Devlin Fieldhouse (657); New Orleans, LA
11/28/2019*; 2:30 pm, FloSports		vs. Boston College; Puerto Rico Classico	L 76–89	3–4	Mario Morales Coliseum; San Juan, PR
11/29/2019*; 2:30 pm, FloSports		vs. Charlotte; Puerto Rico Classico	L 56–60	3–5	Mario Morales Coliseum (100); San Juan, PR
12/04/2019*; 5:00 pm		at Southern Miss	W 62–58	4–5	Reed Green Coliseum (3,668); Hattiesburg, MS
12/07/2019*; 4:00 pm		South Alabama	L 53–62	4–6	Devlin Fieldhouse (527); New Orleans, LA
12/20/2019*; 3:00 pm		Texas Southern; Tulane Classic	L 62–72	4–7	Devlin Fieldhouse (615); New Orleans, LA
12/21/2019*; 3:00 pm		Colorado; Tulane Classic	L 52–62	4–8	Devlin Fieldhouse (703); New Orleans, LA
12/30/2019*; 7:00 pm		Georgia Southern	W 56–40	5–8	Devlin Fieldhouse (473); New Orleans, LA
AAC regular season
01/05/2020; 2:00 pm		at Wichita State	W 61–56	6–8 (1–0)	Charles Koch Arena (1,703); Wichita, KS
01/08/2020; 7:00 pm		Tulsa	W 64–62 ^{OT}	7–8 (2–0)	Devlin Fieldhouse (503); New Orleans, LA
01/11/2020; 2:00 pm		Memphis	W 59–55	8–8 (3–0)	Devlin Fieldhouse (537); New Orleans, LA
01/11/2020; 2:00 pm		at SMU	W 67–66	9–8 (4–0)	Moody Coliseum (495); Dallas, TX
01/18/2020; 3:30 pm, ESPN3		Cincinnati	W 64–59	10–8 (5–0)	Devlin Fieldhouse (1,003); New Orleans, LA
01/22/2020; 7:00 pm, CST/ESPN3		UCF	W 60–59	11–8 (6–0)	Devlin Fieldhouse (588); New Orleans, LA
01/25/2020; 1:00 pm		South Florida	L 56–63	11–9 (6–1)	Yuengling Center (2,207); Tampa, FL
01/29/2020; 7:00 pm		at Tulsa	W 50–46	12–9 (7–1)	Reynolds Center (817); Tulsa, OK
02/01/2020; 2:00 pm		Houston	L 60–66	12–10 (7–2)	Devlin Fieldhouse (857); New Orleans, LA
02/04/2020; 7:00 pm, ADN		at Memphis	L 62–64	12–11 (7–3)	Elma Roane Fieldhouse (492); Memphis, TN
02/13/2020; 7:00 pm		South Florida	L 43–53	12–12 (7–4)	Devlin Fieldhouse (621); New Orleans, LA
02/16/2020; 6:00 pm		Wichita State	L 68–69	12–13 (7–5)	Devlin Fieldhouse (506); New Orleans, LA
02/19/2020; 6:00 pm, SNY/ESPN3		at No. 6 UConn	L 31–74	12–14 (7–6)	XL Center (8,446); Hartford, CT
02/23/2020; 3:00 pm, ESPNU		at Cincinnati	L 63–87	12–15 (7–7)	Fifth Third Arena (3,272); Cincinnati, OH
02/29/2020; 5:00 pm		at East Carolina	L 50–53	12–16 (7–8)	Williams Arena (920); Hartford, CT
03/02/2020; 7:00 pm		Temple	W 53–50	13–16 (8–8)	Devlin Fieldhouse (501); New Orleans, LA
AAC Women's Tournament
03/06/2020; 11:00 am, ESPN3	(5)	vs. (12) Tulsa; First Round	W 67–61	14–16	Mohegan Sun Arena; Uncasville, CT
03/07/2020; 11:00 am, ESPN3	(5)	vs. (4) South Florida; Quarterfinals	L 50–64	14–17	Mohegan Sun Arena; Uncasville, CT
*Non-conference game. ^{#}Rankings from AP Poll. (#) Tournament seedings in parentheses. All times are in Central Time.

== Rankings ==
+ Regular season polls	Poll	Pre- Season	Week 2	Week 3	Week 4	Week 5	Week 6	Week 7	Week 8	Week 9	Week 10	Week 11	Week 12	Week 13	Week 14	Week 15	Week 16	Week 17	Week 18	Week 19	Final
AP																					
Coaches																					

Legend
	Increase in ranking
	Decrease in ranking
	Not ranked previous week
(RV)	Received Votes

== See also ==
- 2019–20 Tulane Green Wave men's basketball team
