= 2019–20 Delaware Fightin' Blue Hens women's basketball team =

Intercollegiate basketball season

2019–20 Delaware Fightin' Blue Hens women's basketball
- Conference: Colonial Athletic Association
- Record: 12-17 (8-10 CAA)
- Head coach: Natasha Adair (3rd season)
- Home arena: Bob Carpenter Center

2019–20 CAA women's basketball standings
	Conf.				Overall
Team	W		L	PCT	W		L	PCT
Drexel	16	–	2	.889	23	–	7	.767
James Madison	16	–	2	.889	25	–	4	.862
William & Mary	12	–	6	.667	21	–	8	.724
Towson	9	–	9	.500	14	–	15	.483
Northeastern	9	–	9	.500	13	–	16	.448
Elon	8	–	10	.444	12	–	17	.414
Delaware	8	–	10	.444	14	–	16	.467
Charleston	6	–	12	.333	13	–	17	.433
UNC Wilmington	6	–	12	.333	10	–	20	.333
Hofstra	0	–	18	.000	3	–	27	.100
† 2020 CAA tournament winner Rankings from AP poll

The 2019–20 Delaware Fightin' Blue Hens women's basketball team represented the University of Delaware during the 2019–20 NCAA Division I women's basketball season. The Fightin' Blue Hens, led by third year head coach Natasha Adair, played their home games at the Bob Carpenter Center and were members of the Colonial Athletic Association (CAA). They finished the regular season 12-17, 8-10 in CAA play to finish in sixth place. Delaware received a bye in the first round of the CAA tournament, however, the tournament was cancelled due to the coronavirus pandemic before they could play their first game, scheduled against William & Mary.

== Roster ==
2019–20 Delaware Fightin' Blue Hens women's basketball team
Players
Coaches

Pos.	#	Name	Height	Year	Previous school	Hometown
G/F	1	Lolo Davenport	6 ft 1 in (1.85 m)	RS Fr	Plano Senior HS	Plano, Texas
G	2	Abby Gonzales	5 ft 7 in (1.7 m)	Sr	North Allegheny Senior HS	Wexford, Pennsylvania
F	3	Brynn Wade	6 ft 1 in (1.85 m)	Fr	Gilbert HS	Gilbert, Arizona
G	4	Paris McBride	5 ft 4 in (1.63 m)	So	Woodbridge HS	Woodbridge, Virginia
F	5	Agnes Paul	6 ft 1 in (1.85 m)	Fr	New Hope Academy	Bowie, Maryland
G	10	Tee Johnson	5 ft 5 in (1.65 m)	Jr	West Port HS/Tallahassee CC	Ocala, Florida
F	12	Lizzie O'Leary	6 ft 2 in (1.88 m)	Jr	Abington Senior HS	Willow Grove, Pennsylvania
G/F	20	Jasmine Dickey	5 ft 10 in (1.78 m)	So	Catonsville HS	Baltimore, Maryland
G/F	21	Chyna Latimer (redshirt)	6 ft 0 in (1.83 m)	Jr	Patterson Mill HS/George Washington	Edgewood, Maryland
G	22	Samone DeFreese	5 ft 9 in (1.75 m)	Sr	Berkshire School	Bergenfield, New Jersey
G	23	Bailey Kargo	5 ft 10 in (1.78 m)	Sr	Walter Hines Page Senior HS	Greensboro, North Carolina
F	25	Rebecca Lawrence	6 ft 3 in (1.91 m)	Sr	Ridgefield HS	Ridgefield, Connecticut
G	30	Kayla Shaw	5 ft 10 in (1.78 m)	RS Jr	Chaparral HS	Scottsdale, Arizona
F	32	Ty Battle (redshirt)	6 ft 0 in (1.83 m)	Jr	Oswego East HS/Indiana State	Plainfield, Illinois
F	33	Nicole Enabosi	6 ft 1 in (1.85 m)	RS Sr	Our Lady of Good Counsel	Gaithersburg, Maryland

Head coach

- Natasha Adair (South Florida)

Assistant coach(es)

- Bob Clark (Towson)
- Sarah Jenkins (Georgetown)
- Mykala Walker (Wake Forest)

Legend

- (C) Team captain
- (S) Suspended
- (I) Ineligible
- (W) Walk-on
- Injured
- Current redshirt

Roster
Last update: 1 April 2021
