= St. John's Red Storm women's basketball =

American college basketball team

St. John's Red Storm
2026–27 St. John's Red Storm women's basketball team
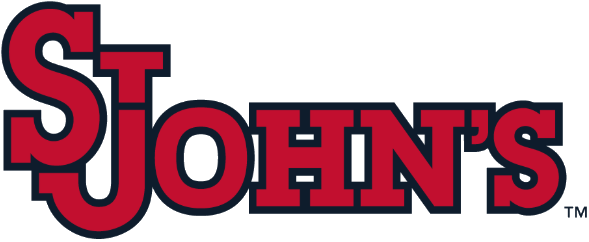
- University: St. John's University
- Head coach: Joe Tartamella (15th season)
- Location: New York City, New York
- Arena: Carnesecca Arena (capacity: 5,602)
- Conference: Big East
- Nickname: Red Storm
- Colors: Red and white

NCAA Division I tournament Sweet Sixteen
- 2012

NCAA Division I tournament appearances
- 1983, 1984, 1988, 2006, 2010, 2011, 2012, 2013, 2014, 2016, 2023

AIAW tournament appearances
- 1982

Conference tournament champions
- 1983, 1984, 1988, 2016

Conference regular-season champions
- 1983, 1985

The St. John's Red Storm women's basketball team represents St. John's University in New York City, New York, United States. The school's team competes in the Big East, where it has competed since the 1982–1983 season. The women’s basketball team began competing in the AIAW in 1974–1975 under coach Vickie Kresse, obtaining a 10–8 record and its first winning season. The Red Storm are coached by Joe Tartamella, who took the helm of the program in 2012.

== Year by year results ==
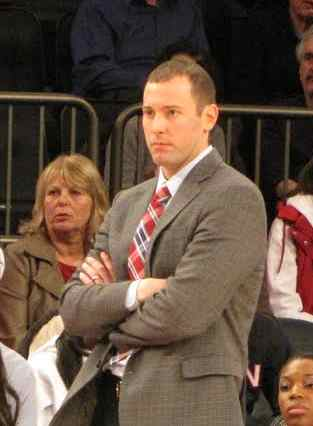
Joe Tartamella, head coach St. Johns women's basketball team

Record table
Season	Coach	Overall	Conference	Standing	Postseason
Vickie Kresse (1974–1979)
1974–75	Vickie Kresse	10–8			
1975–76	Vickie Kresse	23–8			
1976–77	Vickie Kresse	24–7			
1977–78	Vickie Kresse	26–5			
1978–79	Vickie Kresse	17–15			
Vickie Kresse:		100–43 (.699)			
Don Perrelli (1979–1984)
1979–80	Don Perrelli	16–16			
1980–81	Don Perrelli	26–8			
1981–82	Don Perrelli	25–7			AIAW Round of 16
Big East Conference (1982–present)
1982–83	Don Perrelli	27–6	7–1	1st	NCAA Round of 32
1983–84	Don Perrelli	24–6	5–3	T-2nd	NCAA Round of 32
Don Perrelli:		118–43 (.733)	12–4 (.750)		
Joe Mullaney Jr. (1984–1996)
1984–85	Joe Mullaney Jr.	18–11	12–4	T-1st	
1985–86	Joe Mullaney Jr.	19–9	11–5	4th	
1986–87	Joe Mullaney Jr.	16–13	9–7	T-4th	
1987–88	Joe Mullaney Jr.	22–10	10–6	T-3rd	NCAA Round of 32
1988–89	Joe Mullaney Jr.	10–18	5–11	7th	
1989–90	Joe Mullaney Jr.	12–17	5–11	T-7th	
1990–91	Joe Mullaney Jr.	16–12	10–6	T-3rd	
1991–92	Joe Mullaney Jr.	14–14	5–13	T-8th	
1992–93	Joe Mullaney Jr.	12–16	5–13	8th	
1993–94	Joe Mullaney Jr.	8–20	4–14	9th	
1994–95	Joe Mullaney Jr.	15–12	10–8	T-4th	
1995–96	Joe Mullaney Jr.	6–21	4–14	12th (6th BE6)	
Joe Mullaney Jr.:		168–173 (.493)	90–112 (.446)		
Charlene Thomas-Swinson (1996–1999)
1996–97	Charlene Thomas-Swinson	5–22	3–15	T-12th (6th BE6)	
1997–98	Charlene Thomas-Swinson	6–21	4–14	12th (6th BE6)	
1998–99	Charlene Thomas-Swinson	13–18	7–11	8th	
Charlene Thomas-Swinson:		24–61 (.282)	14–40 (.259)		
Darcel Estep (1999–2002)
1999–00	Darcel Estep	11–18	5–11	T-9th	
2000–01	Darcel Estep	8–20	3–13	T-12th	
Pechone Stepps (2002–2002)
2001–02*	Darcel Estep; Pechone Stepps; TOTAL	3–13; 0–11; 3–24	0–5; 0–11; 0–16	14th	
Darcel Estep:		22–51 (.301)	8–29 (.216)		
Pechone Stepps:		0–11 (.000)	0–11 (.000)		
Kim Barnes Arico (2002–2012)
2002–03	Kim Barnes Arico	8–19	2–4	14th	
2003–04	Kim Barnes Arico	10–18	4–12	11th	
2004–05	Kim Barnes Arico	20–11	7–9	T-6th	WNIT Round of 16
2005–06	Kim Barnes Arico	22–8	11–5	T-3rd	NCAA Round of 32
2006–07	Kim Barnes Arico	8–20	4–12	12th	
2007–08	Kim Barnes Arico	18–15	7–9	10th	WNIT Quarterfinals
2008–09	Kim Barnes Arico	19–15	4–12	T-13th	WNIT Round of 16
2009–10	Kim Barnes Arico	25–7	12–4	4th	NCAA Round of 32
2010–11	Kim Barnes Arico	22–11	9–7	T-8th	NCAA Round of 32
2011–12	Kim Barnes Arico	24–10	13–3	T-2nd	NCAA Sweet Sixteen
Kim Barnes Arico:		176–134 (.541)	73–87 (.456)		
Joe Tartamella (2012–present)
2012–13	Joe Tartamella	18–13	11–5	T-3rd	NCAA Round of 64
2013–14	Joe Tartamella	23–11	13–5	2nd	NCAA Round of 32
2014–15	Joe Tartamella	23–11	11–7	4th	WNIT Round of 16
2015–16	Joe Tartamella	23–10	11–7	4th	NCAA Round of 64
2016–17	Joe Tartamella	22–12	11–7	T-4th	WNIT Round of 16
2017–18	Joe Tartamella	19–15	9–9	T-5th	WNIT Quarterfinals
2018–19	Joe Tartamella	15–16	7–11	T–8th	
2019–20	Joe Tartamella	19–12	11–7	T–3rd	
2020–21	Joe Tartamella	8–15	4–12	8th	
2021–22	Joe Tartamella	12–19	7–12	7th	
2022–23	Joe Tartamella	23–9	13–7	T–4th	NCAA Round of 64
2023–24	Joe Tartamella	19–15	11–7	T–3rd	WBIT Second Round
2024–25	Joe Tartamella	16–15	5–13	T–8th	
2025–26	Joe Tartamella	22–12	11–9	T–5th	WBIT First Round
Joe Tartamella:		261–185 (.585)	135–118 (.534)		
Big East Conference:			332–199 (.625)		
Total:		848–690 (.551)			
National champion Postseason invitational champion Conference regular season champion Conference regular season and conference tournament champion Division regular season champion Division regular season and conference tournament champion Conference tournament champion

== Postseason results ==
=== NCAA Division I ===
St. John's has appeared in the NCAA Division I women's basketball tournament eleven times. They have a record of 8–11.

Year	Seed	Round	Opponent	Result
1983	#7	First Round	#2 Old Dominion	L 63–86
1984	#7	First Round	#2 North Carolina	L 79–81 (OT)
1988	#7	First Round; Second Round	#10 Fairfield #2 Virginia	W 83–70; L 64–75
2006	#7	First Round; Second Round	#10 California #2 Maryland	W 78–68; L 74–81
2010	#6	First Round; Second Round	#11 Princeton #3 Florida State	W 65–47; L 65–66 (OT)
2011	#9	First Round; Second Round	#8 Texas Tech #1 Stanford	W 55–50; L 49–75
2012	#3	First Round; Second Round; Sweet Sixteen	#14 Creighton #6 Oklahoma #2 Duke	W 69–67; W 74–70; L 47–74
2013	#10	First Round	#7 Dayton	L 90–96 (2OT)
2014	#8	First Round; Second Round	#9 Southern Cal #1 Tennessee	W 71–68; L 51–67
2016	#8	First Round	#9 Auburn	L 57–68
2023	#11	First Four; First Round	#11 Purdue #6 North Carolina	W 66–64; L 59–61

=== AIAW Division I ===
The Red Storm made one appearance in the AIAW National Division I basketball tournament, with a combined record of 0–1.

Year	Round	Opponent	Result
1982	First Round	Minnesota	L, 56–68

== Players selected in the WBL Draft ==
1981 – 2nd Round – Dallas Diamonds – Debbie Brajevich

== Players selected in the WNBA draft ==
Year	Round	Pick	Overall	Name	Team
2013	2	5	17	Nadirah McKenith	Washington Mystics
2013	3	1	25	Shenneika Smith	New York Liberty
2016	3	3	27	Aliyyah Handford	Connecticut Sun
2016	3	7	31	Danaejah Grant	Washington Mystics
First round pick Active players

== Roster ==
2026–27 St. John's Red Storm women's basketball team
Players
Coaches

Pos.	#	Name	Height	Year	Previous school	Hometown
G	1	Asia Donald	5 ft 9 in (1.75 m)	Jr	West Georgia	Hobart, IN
F	2	Julie Bahati	6 ft 1 in (1.85 m)	Sr	Springfield Central	Nairobi, Kenya
G	3	Syvannah Dawson	5 ft 9 in (1.75 m)	Fr	S3 Academy	Richmond, VA
G	4	Olivia Tucker	5 ft 7 in (1.7 m)	Jr	Campbell	Durham, NC
G	5	Sanaa Tripp	5 ft 7 in (1.7 m)	Jr	Belmont	Covington, GA
F	7	Yohana Fami	6 ft 1 in (1.85 m)	Fr	Royal Crown	Montréal, Québec
G	8	Reina Green	5 ft 9 in (1.75 m)	Sr	Duquesne	Fort Lauderdale, FL
G	10	Brooke Moore	6 ft 0 in (1.83 m)	Sr	Liberty	Kennesaw, GA
G	11	Janeya Grant	6 ft 0 in (1.83 m)	Jr	South Shore Christian	Middletown, CT
F	16	Daniela Abies	6 ft 0 in (1.83 m)	RS Sr	Miami (FL)	Málaga, Spain
F	20	Sa'Mya Wyatt	6 ft 2 in (1.88 m)	Jr	Austin Peay	Powder Springs, GA
F	33	Serenity Lancaster	6 ft 1 in (1.85 m)	Fr	New Hampton	New London, CT

Head coach

- Joe Tartamella (James Madison)

Assistant coach(es)

- Steve Pogue (Nyack)
- Kaity Healy (Seton Hall)
- Vanessa Abel (Duquesne)
- Joe Rutigliano (Canisius)

Legend

- (C) Team captain
- (S) Suspended
- (I) Ineligible
- (W) Walk-on
- Injured
- Current redshirt

Roster
Last update: September 6, 2026
