= Frederica Academy =

Private, college preparatory school in Georgia, U.S.

Coordinates: 31.1676°N 81.4031°W

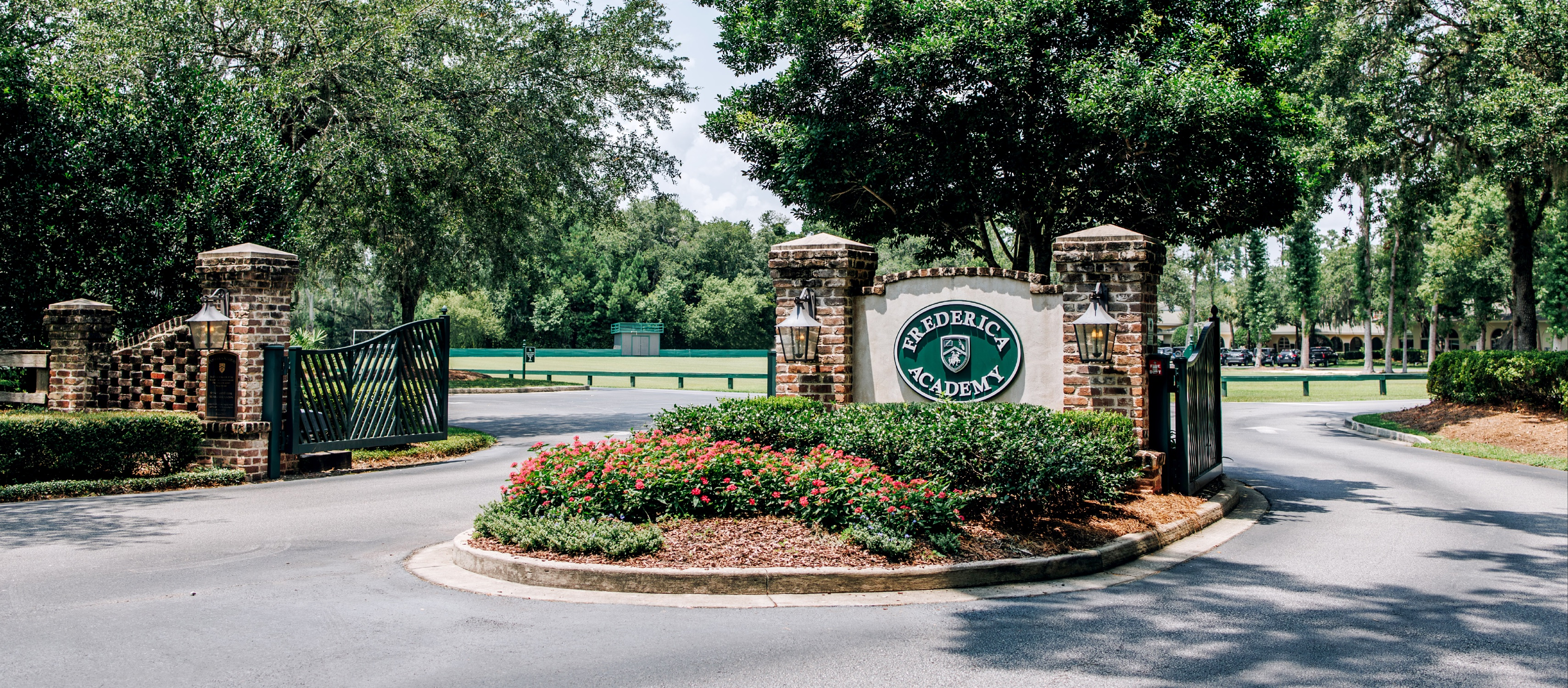
- Front Gate
- 200 Murray Way; Saint Simons Island, Glynn County, Georgia 31522; United States

Information
- Type: Private, college preparatory
- Established: 1969
- Head of school: Scott L. Hutchinson
- Faculty: 85 (2025-2026)
- Teaching staff: 44.5 (on an FTE basis)
- Grades: PK–12
- Enrollment: 513 (2025-2026)
- Student to teacher ratio: 8.3
- Colors: Forest green and white
- Mascot: Knights
- Accreditation: SAIS-SACS
- Tuition: $11,600 (Pre-Kindergarten) $16,000 (Kindergarten) $19,400 (Grades 1–4) $21,500 (Grade 5) $22,000 (Grades 6–8) $23,800 (Grades 9–12)
- Website: http://www.fredericaacademy.org

Frederica Academy is an independent, coeducational, college preparatory school located on Saint Simons Island, Georgia, United States. It serves students from grades Pre-K to 12. The school has a fully functional lower school, middle school, and upper school. The current head of school is Scott L. Hutchinson.

== Campus life ==
=== Athletics ===
Sports at the school include Baseball, Basketball, Cheerleading, Football, Cross Country, Golf, Soccer, Swimming, Tennis, Track & Field, and Volleyball.

=== Clubs and Organizations ===
Students at the school participate in school sponsored clubs and organizations, including:

- Adventure Club
- Advisory Mentor Program
- Ambassador Club
- Art Club
- Chess Club
- Creative Writing Club
- Cultural Awareness Club
- Debate Club
- Dinosaur Club
- Fellowship of Christian Athletes (FCA)
- The FRED Theater Company
- Homework Helper
- Honor Council
- Humane Society Teen Board
- Innovation Meets Entrepreneurship
- JV Math Team
- Nightingales
- Model United Nations
- Mythology Club
- National Honor Society (NHS)
- The Obsidian (Literary Magazine)
- Science Bowl Team
- Service Council
- STEM Club
- Student Council
- Varsity Math Team
- World Language & Culture Club

== History ==
Founded in 1969 by Dewey and Tiggie Benefield, the school was originally located in Brunswick. The original buildings still house the lower and middle school grades. In 2004, construction was completed on the upper school building, Corn Hall. A second upper school building, Jones Hall, opened in 2024.

== Facilities ==
Frederica's campus features one lower school building, two middle school buildings (Benefield Hall and Fleming Hall), a fifth grade hall, two upper school buildings (Corn Hall and Jones Hall), gymnasium, cafeteria (Hamilton Hall), auditorium, several outdoor courts and fields, library, administration building, science laboratory, and art studio.
