= 2023 Minnesota Lynx season =

- Head coach: Cheryl Reeve
- Arena: Target Center

Results
- Record: 19–21 (.475)
- Place: 3rd (Western)
- Playoff finish: 6th seed; Lost 1st Round 1–2 to Connecticut

Media
- Television: Bally Sports North; ESPN; CBS Sports Network; ION; Amazon Prime Video

The 2023 Minnesota Lynx season was the 25th season for the Minnesota Lynx of the Women's National Basketball Association, and the fourteenth season under head coach Cheryl Reeve.

Reeve signed a multi-year contract extension to return as Head Coach in November, while also moving from general manager to president of basketball operations. On December 13, 2022, the Lynx announced Clare Duwelius as the fourth General Manager in franchise history.

The Lynx earned the second overall pick through the 2023 WNBA Draft Lottery. They went into the lottery selection holding the fourth best odds to get the first overall pick, but still moved up two selections.

On November 22, 2022, Natalie Achonwa announced her pregnancy via Instagram.

The WNBA announced that the first WNBA Canada Game would feature the Chicago Sky and the Lynx on Saturday, May 13, 2023, at Scotiabank Arena in Toronto, ON. This would be the first-ever WNBA preseason game in Canada.

On September 4, Napheesa Collier was announced as the first-ever winner of the Sylvia Fowles Altruism Award. The Sylvia Fowles Altruism Award will be an annual award recognizing a Lynx player who best embodies the altruistic traits of kindness, selflessness and overall regard for the well-being of others throughout the community.

The Lynx season started out slowly as they lost five straight games to start the season, ending May 0–5. The losing streak was extended to six as the Lynx lost their first game in June. They won their first game of the season on June 3. They followed up the win with another loss, but then beat Los Angeles back to back. They lost two of their next three games, but won two straight games against Seattle to end June with a 6–4 record. Their two-game win streak carried over into July, where the Lynx won their first three games of the month. This five game winning streak was followed by a three-game losing streak. The Lynx would win four of their last five games of the month to finish July with a 7–4 record, and make it back to .500 overall. The better fortunes would not stick around to begin August as the Lynx lost three of their first four games. They did win three of their next four before losing the last two games of the month to finish August 4–6. Entering September, the Lynx were solidly in the hunt for a playoff spot. They won their first two games of the month and secured a playoff spot on September 5. They would lose their last two games of the season and finish September 2–2.

The Lynx finished the season 19–21, which saw them finish in a tie for fifth place in the playoff standings. In the tiebreaker with the Atlanta Dream and the Washington Mystics they finished second. The tiebreaker was overall record against the teams and Minnesota was 3–3. As the sixth overall seed in the 2023 WNBA Playoffs the Lynx would face off against the Connecticut Sun, with the first two games of the series being in Connecticut. In the first game of the series, the Sun got off to a hot start and ended up winning game one 90–60. Needing to win to force a third game, the Lynx won a close game in Connecticut 82–75. However, they could not seal the series at home, losing 75–90 to end their season.

== Transactions ==
=== WNBA draft ===
Round	Pick	Player	Nationality	School/Team/Country
1	2	Diamond Miller	United States	Maryland
1	12	Maïa Hirsch	France	ESB Villeneuve-d'Ascq
2	16	Dorka Juhász	Hungary	UConn
2	24	Brea Beal	United States	South Carolina
3	28	Taylor Soule	United States	Virginia Tech

=== Transactions ===
Date	Transaction
November 3, 2022	Signed Head Coach Cheryl Reeve to Multi-Year Contract Extension. Reeve also promoted to President of basketball operations
December 13, 2022	Named Clare Duwelius as General Manager
January 13, 2023	Extended Qualifying Offers to Bridget Carleton and Anna Cruz
January 16, 2023	Maya Moore officially announced her retirement from the WNBA
February 3, 2023	Signed Damiris Dantas, Bridget Carleton, Lindsay Allen, Nikolina Milić, and Tiffany Mitchell
February 4, 2023	Signed Kiana Williams, Stephanie Watts, and Maya Dodson to Training Camp Contracts
February 18, 2023	Signed Rachel Banham
March 15, 2023	Hired Kristin Haynie as Assistant Coach
April 14, 2023	Signed Diamond Miller, Dorka Juhász, Brea Beal, and Taylor Soule to Rookie Scale Contracts
April 14, 2023	Signed Myah Selland and Keishana Washington to Training Camp Contracts
April 20, 2023	Assistant Coach Kristin Haynie announces she will leave to become the head coach at Central Michigan
April 26, 2023	Hired Elaine Powell as Assistant Coach
May 3, 2023	Waived Keishana Washington
May 8, 2023	Waived Stephanie Watts and Kiana Williams
May 14, 2023	Waived Maya Dodson and Myah Selland
May 16, 2023	Waived Brea Beal
May 18, 2023	Waived Damiris Dantas and Taylor Soule
May 18, 2023	Placed Natalie Achonwa on the Inactive List due to Pregnancy/Child-Birth
June 14, 2023	Signed Emily Engstler to a Hardship Contract
June 26, 2023	Signed Kayana Traylor to a Hardship Contract
July 20, 2023	Released Kayana Traylor from the Hardship Contract
July 26, 2023	Released Emily Engstler from the Hardship Contract
July 28, 2023	Signed Emily Engstler to a 7-Day Contract
September 8, 2023	Signed Kayla McBride to a Contract Extension

=== Roster Changes ===
==== Additions ====
Personnel	Signed	Former team
Tiffany Mitchell	Free Agency	Indiana Fever
Diamond Miller	Draft Pick	2023 Draft Pick
Dorka Juhász	Draft Pick	2023 Draft Pick

==== Subtractions ====
Personnel	Reason	New team
Sylvia Fowles	Retired	
Moriah Jefferson	Free Agency	Phoenix Mercury
Damiris Dantas	Waived	-

== Roster ==
2023 Minnesota Lynx roster
Players
Coaches

Pos.	No.	Nat.	Name	Height	Weight	DOB	From	Yrs
F	11	(Canada)	Achonwa, Natalie (Maternity Leave)	6' 3" (1.91m)	198 lb (90kg)	1992-11-22	Notre Dame	8
G	2	(United States)	Allen, Lindsay (injured)	5' 8" (1.73m)	145 lb (66kg)	1995-03-20	Notre Dame	5
G	15	(United States)	Banham, Rachel	5' 9" (1.75m)	175 lb (79kg)	1993-07-15	Minnesota	7
G/F	6	(Canada)	Carleton, Bridget	6' 1" (1.85m)	190 lb (86kg)	1997-05-22	Iowa State	4
F	24	(United States)	Collier, Napheesa	6' 2" (1.88m)	185 lb (84kg)	1996-09-23	Connecticut	4
G/F	14	(Hungary)	Juhász, Dorka	6' 5" (1.96m)	192 lb (87kg)	1999-12-18	Connecticut	R
G	21	(United States)	McBride, Kayla	5' 10" (1.78m)	186 lb (84kg)	1992-06-25	Notre Dame	9
F	31	(Serbia)	Milić, Nikolina	6' 3" (1.91m)	172 lb (78kg)	1994-04-12	Serbia	1
G	1	(United States)	Miller, Diamond	6' 3" (1.91m)	163 lb (74kg)	2001-02-11	Maryland	R
G	25	(United States)	Mitchell, Tiffany	5' 9" (1.75m)	152 lb (69kg)	1994-09-23	South Carolina	7
G/F	3	(United States)	Powers, Aerial	5' 9" (1.75m)	166 lb (75kg)	1994-07-17	Michigan State	7
F	10	(United States)	Shepard, Jessica	6' 3" (1.91m)	184 lb (83kg)	1996-09-11	Notre Dame	2
F		(France)	Hirsch, Maïa (DP)	6' 5" (1.96m)		2003-11-13	France

Head coach
(United States) Cheryl Reeve (La Salle)
Assistant coaches
(United States) Katie Smith (Ohio State)
(United States) Rebekkah Brunson (Georgetown)
(United States) Elaine Powell (LSU)
Athletic trainer
(United States) Chuck Barta (UW–La Crosse)
Assistant trainer
(United States) Brandi BlueArm (Minnesota State)

Legend

- (C) Team captain
- (DP) Unsigned draft pick
- (FA) Free agent
- (S) Suspended
- Injured

=== Depth ===
Pos.	Starter	Bench
PG	Lindsay Allen	Tiffany Mitchell
SG	Kayla McBride	Rachel Banham
SF	Diamond Miller	Bridget Carleton; Aerial Powers
PF	Napheesa Collier	Nikolina Milić
C	Jessica Shepard	Dorka Juhász; Natalie Achonwa(inactive)

== Schedule ==
=== Preseason ===
2023 game log
Total: 1–1 (Home: 1–0; Road: 0–1)
May: 1–1 (Home: 1–0; Road: 0–1)

Game	Date	Team	Score	High points	High rebounds	High assists	Location Attendance	Record
1	May 5	Washington	W 72–69	Diamond Miller (19)	Dorka Juhász (10)	Tiffany Mitchell (6)	Target Center; 5,001	1–0
2	May 13	vs. Chicago	L 74–82	Tiffany Mitchell (19)	Juhász; McBride (6)	Tiffany Mitchell (6)	Scotiabank Arena; 19,800	1–1

2023 season schedule

=== Regular season ===
2023 game log
Total: 19–21 (Home: 9–11; Road: 10–10)
May: 0–5 (Home: 0–2; Road: 0–3)

Game	Date	Team	Score	High points	High rebounds	High assists	Location Attendance	Record
1	May 19	Chicago	L 66–77	Napheesa Collier (17)	Jessica Shepard (8)	Jessica Shepard (7)	Target Center; 8,024	0–1
2	May 23	Atlanta	L 77–83	Napheesa Collier (20)	Jessica Shepard (10)	Napheesa Collier (5)	Target Center; 7,803	0–2
3	May 25	@ Phoenix	L 81–90	Aerial Powers (20)	Napheesa Collier (7)	Collier; Mitchell (4)	Footprint Center; 6,057	0–3
4	May 28	@ Las Vegas	L 73–94	Napheesa Collier (21)	Jessica Shepard (15)	Jessica Shepard (7)	Michelob Ultra Arena; 7,970	0–4
5	May 30	@ Dallas	L 89–94	Kayla McBride (18)	Jessica Shepard (10)	Jessica Shepard (5)	College Park Center; 3,484	0–5

June : 6–4 (Home: 2–3; Road: 4–1)

Game	Date	Team	Score	High points	High rebounds	High assists	Location Attendance	Record
6	June 1	Connecticut	L 84–89	Napheesa Collier (30)	Jessica Shepard (12)	Collier; Shepard (4)	Target Center; 8,124	0–6
7	June 3	@ Washington	W 80–78	Kayla McBride (24)	Napheesa Collier (9)	Jessica Shepard (6)	Entertainment and Sports Arena; 3,534	1–6
8	June 7	@ New York	Postponed until July 28 due to poor air quality				Barclays Center	
9	June 9	Indiana	L 69–71	Napheesa Collier (28)	Napheesa Collier (14)	Allen; Shepard (4)	Target Center; 8,510	1–7
10	June 11	Los Angeles	W 91–86	Napheesa Collier (24)	Jessica Shepard (13)	Napheesa Collier (6)	Target Center; 8,025	2–7
11	June 16	@ Los Angeles	W 77–72	Napheesa Collier (25)	Napheesa Collier (6)	Rachel Banham (6)	Crypto.com Arena; 5,265	3–7
12	June 18	@ Las Vegas	L 62–93	Napheesa Collier (18)	Dorka Juhász (9)	Carleton; Juhász (3)	Michelob Ultra Arena; 8,036	3–8
13	June 20	@ Los Angeles	W 67–61	Napheesa Collier (26)	Napheesa Collier (14)	Lindsay Allen (8)	Crypto.com Arena; 4,180	4–8
14	June 22	Connecticut	L 68–89	Napheesa Collier (21)	Collier; Engstler (7)	Lindsay Allen (7)	Target Center; 7,024	4–9
15	June 27	Seattle	W 104–93	Napheesa Collier (33)	Dorka Juhász (12)	Lindsay Allen (9)	Target Center; 7,014	5–9
16	June 29	@ Seattle	W 99–97 (OT)	Napheesa Collier (31)	Collier; Juhász (8)	Lindsay Allen (6)	Climate Pledge Arena; 6,894	6–9

July : 7–4 (Home: 4–3; Road: 3–1)

Game	Date	Team	Score	High points	High rebounds	High assists	Location Attendance	Record
17	July 1	@ Phoenix	W 86–76	Diamond Miller (25)	Napheesa Collier (9)	Lindsay Allen (8)	Footprint Center; 8,777	7–9
18	July 5	Indiana	W 90–83	Napheesa Collier (32)	Napheesa Collier (8)	Lindsay Allen (6)	Target Center; 7,624	8–9
19	July 7	Phoenix	W 75–64	Napheesa Collier (12)	Napheesa Collier (12)	Napheesa Collier (5)	Target Center; 7,714	9–9
20	July 9	Las Vegas	L 89–113	Napheesa Collier (18)	Carleton; Collier; Milić (5)	Rachel Banham (7)	Target Center; 7,701	9–10
21	July 12	Dallas	L 67–107	Napheesa Collier (11)	Allen; Milić (5)	Allen; Banham (6)	Target Center; 13,351	9–11
22	July 18	@ Atlanta	L 73–82	Napheesa Collier (35)	Dorka Juhász (12)	Lindsay Allen (5)	Gateway Center Arena; 2,394	9–12
23	July 20	Los Angeles	W 73–70	Napheesa Collier (22)	Dorka Juhász (10)	Diamond Miller (9)	Target Center; 7,014	10–12
24	July 22	Las Vegas	L 81–98	Diamond Miller (17)	Collier; Juhász (8)	Lindsay Allen (4)	Target Center; 7,801	10–13
25	July 26	Washington	W 97–92	Napheesa Collier (24)	Napheesa Collier (11)	Diamond Miller (9)	Target Center; 7,024	11–13
26	July 28	New York	W 88–83	Kayla McBride (26)	Dorka Juhász (10)	Allen; McBride; Shepard (4)	Barclays Center; 6,129	12–13
27	July 30	@ Connecticut	W 87–83	Kayla McBride (19)	Jessica Shepard (14)	Lindsay Allen (6)	Mohegan Sun Arena; 8,275	13–13

August : 4–6 (Home: 1–3; Road: 3–3)

Game	Date	Team	Score	High points	High rebounds	High assists	Location Attendance	Record
28	August 1	@ Connecticut	L 69–79	Lindsay Allen (16)	Dorka Juhász (11)	Diamond Miller (6)	Mohegan Sun Arena; 4,894	13–14
29	August 4	New York	L 66–76	Napheesa Collier (18)	Jessica Shepard (11)	Lindsay Allen (10)	Target Center; 7,631	13–15
30	August 8	@ Chicago	W 88–79	Napheesa Collier (29)	Diamond Miller (11)	Kayla McBride (7)	Wintrust Arena; 5,099	14–15
31	August 10	@ Indiana	L 73–91	Rachel Banham (18)	Jessica Shepard (7)	Lindsay Allen (5)	Gainbridge Fieldhouse; 2,551	14–16
32	August 18	@ Seattle	W 78–70	Napheesa Collier (24)	Dorka Juhász (12)	Collier; Juhász; McBride (4)	Climate Pledge Arena; 8,865	15–16
33	August 20	Seattle	L 74–88	Kayla McBride (18)	Napheesa Collier (9)	Diamond Miller (6)	Target Center; 6,525	15–17
34	August 22	Dallas	W 91–86	Napheesa Collier (29)	Napheesa Collier (7)	Dorka Juhász (7)	Target Center; 6,291	16–17
35	August 24	@ Dallas	W 90–81	Napheesa Collier (25)	Collier; McBride (7)	Tiffany Mitchell (7)	College Park Center; 3,931	17–17
36	August 26	New York	L 76–111	Diamond Miller (18)	Diamond Miller (9)	Rachel Banham (4)	Target Center; 7,101	17–18
37	August 29	@ Washington	L 72–83	Diamond Miller (25)	Napheesa Collier (10)	Collier; Juhász (4)	Entertainment and Sports Arena; 3,708	17–19

September : 2–2 (Home: 2–0; Road: 0–2)

Game	Date	Team	Score	High points	High rebounds	High assists	Location Attendance	Record
38	September 1	Atlanta	W 91–85 (OT)	Napheesa Collier (27)	Napheesa Collier (17)	Juhász; Mitchell (6)	Target Center; 7,114	18–19
39	September 3	Phoenix	W 86–73	Kayla McBride (23)	Napheesa Collier (16)	Dorka Juhász (8)	Target Center; 7,314	19–19
40	September 8	@ Chicago	L 87–92	Napheesa Collier (28)	Dorka Juhász (10)	Collier; Juhász; Mitchell (5)	Wintrust Arena; 7,994	19–20
41	September 10	@ Indiana	L 72–87	Kayla McBride (24)	Collier; Juhász (10)	Tiffany Mitchell (3)	Gainbridge Fieldhouse; 4,009	19–21

2023 season schedule

=== Playoffs ===
2023 playoff game log
First Round vs. Connecticut
Lost Series: 1–2

Game	Date	Team	Score	High points	High rebounds	High assists	Location Attendance	Series
1	September 13	@ Connecticut	L 60–90	Kayla McBride (16)	Collier; Juhász (6)	Kayla McBride (3)	Mohegan Sun Arena; 5,056	0–1
2	September 17	@ Connecticut	W 82–75	Kayla McBride (28)	Napheesa Collier (13)	Dorka Juhász (6)	Mohegan Sun Arena; 6,673	1–1
3	September 20	Connecticut	L 75–90	Napheesa Collier (31)	Kayla McBride (7)	Tiffany Mitchell (5)	Target Center; 8,724	1–2

2023 playoff schedule

== Standings ==
#	Team	W	L	PCT	GB	Conf.	Home	Road	Cup
1	x – Las Vegas Aces	34	6	.850	–	18–2	19–1	15–5	9–1
2	x – New York Liberty	32	8	.800	2	16–4	15–5	17–3	7–3
3	x – Connecticut Sun	27	13	.675	7	14–6	13–7	14–6	7–3
4	x – Dallas Wings	22	18	.550	12	11–9	11–9	11–9	6–4
5	x – Atlanta Dream	19	21	.475	15	11–9	11–9	8–12	6–4
6	x – Minnesota Lynx	19	21	.475	15	12–8	9–11	10–10	5–5
7	x – Washington Mystics	19	21	.475	15	9–11	12–8	7–13	5–5
8	x – Chicago Sky	18	22	.450	16	5–15	7–13	11–9	3–7
9	e – Los Angeles Sparks	17	23	.425	17	9–11	10–10	7–13	5–5
10	e – Indiana Fever	13	27	.325	21	5–15	6–14	7–13	2–8
11	e – Seattle Storm	11	29	.275	23	8–12	4–16	7–13	4–6
12	e – Phoenix Mercury	9	31	.225	25	2–18	8–12	1–19	1–9

== Playoffs ==
**First round** Best-of-3
**1**	**Las Vegas Aces**	**2**
8	Chicago Sky	0
**4**	**Dallas Wings**	**2**
5	Atlanta Dream	0
**2**	**New York Liberty**	**2**
7	Washington Mystics	0
**3**	**Connecticut Sun**	**2**
6	Minnesota Lynx	1

**Semifinals**; Best-of-5
**1**	**Las Vegas Aces**	**3**
4	Dallas Wings	0
**2**	**New York Liberty**	**3**
3	Connecticut Sun	1

**Finals**; Best-of-5
1	**Las Vegas Aces**	**3**
2	New York Liberty	1

- **Bold** – Series winner
- Italic – Team with home-court advantage

== Statistics ==
Legend
GP	Games played	GS	Games started	MPG	Minutes per game	RPG	Rebounds per game
APG	Assists per game	SPG	Steals per game	BPG	Blocks per game	PPG	Points per game
FG%	Field-goal percentage	3P%	3-point field-goal percentage	FT%	Free-throw percentage	TO	Turnovers per game
PF	Fouls per game		Team leader		League leader

=== Regular season ===
Player	GP	GS	MPG	FG%	3P%	FT%	RPG	APG	SPG	BPG	PPG
Napheesa Collier	37	37	33.5	.485	.298	.840	8.5	2.5	1.6	1.2	21.5
Kayla McBride	38	38	31.8	.424	.342	.867	3.2	2.2	1.2	0.2	14.3
Diamond Miller	32	32	26.1	.403	.307	.800	3.5	2.5	0.9	0.3	12.1
Jessica Shepard	21	17	26.9	.516	.000	.774	7.0	3.1	0.6	0.1	8.1
Tiffany Mitchell	33	21	23.1	.404	.289	.833	2.3	2.3	0.5	0.1	7.3
Lindsay Allen	29	20	24.1	.399	.206	.792	2.4	4.5	0.6	0.1	6.2
Dorka Juhász	38	27	24.2	.472	.271	.540	6.5	2.6	0.9	0.6	6.0
Nikolina Milić	39	3	12.7	.464	.364	.804	2.4	0.8	0.1	0.1	5.9
Rachel Banham	32	1	13.6	.370	.402	.786	1.0	1.7	0.3	0.1	5.5
Aerial Powers	20	0	9.8	.345	.337	.733	1.8	0.9	0.3	0.1	3.2
Bridget Carleton	38	4	15.1	.345	.337	.733	2.3	0.9	0.3	0.1	3.2
Emily Engstler^{‡}	12	0	7.8	.381	.286	.375	2.4	0.6	0.4	0.1	1.8
Kayana Traylor^{‡}	8	0	4.4	.300	.000	1.000	0.1	0.4	0.3	0.0	1.0

^{‡}Waived/Released during the season
^{†}Traded during the season
^{≠}Acquired during the season

=== Playoffs ===
Player	GP	GS	MPG	FG%	3P%	FT%	RPG	APG	SPG	BPG	PPG
Napheesa Collier	3	3	36.0	.509	.333	.867	8.0	1.7	0.7	1.3	23.7
Kayla McBride	3	3	39.3	.432	.370	1.000	6.0	2.7	1.0	0.0	18.0
Bridget Carleton	3	0	24.0	.600	.444	.750	3.7	0.7	1.0	0.0	8.3
Diamond Miller	3	3	23.0	.261	.222	.667	1.3	2.0	1.0	0.0	5.3
Dorka Juhász	3	3	24.0	.500	.000	.455	5.0	2.7	0.7	0.0	5.0
Rachel Banham	3	0	19.7	.316	.231	.000	1.7	3.0	1.0	0.7	5.0
Aerial Powers	1	0	14.0	.000	.000	1.000	3.0	0.0	1.0	0.0	4.0
Tiffany Mitchell	3	3	21.7	.417	.500	.000	3.3	3.7	0.3	0.0	3.7
Nikolina Milić	3	0	7.3	.400	.000	1.000	1.3	0.7	0.0	0.0	2.0

== Awards and honors ==
Recipient	Award/Milestone	Date Awarded	Reference
Napheesa Collier	WNBA All-Star	July 1	
Napheesa Collier	Western Conference Player of the Week	July 5	
Napheesa Collier	Western Conference Player of the Week	September 4	
Napheesa Collier	Sylvia Fowles Altruism Award	September 4	
Napheesa Collier	All-Defensive Second Team	September 22	
Napheesa Collier	All-WNBA First Team	October 15	
Diamond Miller	Rookie of the Month - July	August 2	
Diamond Miller	WNBA All-Rookie Team	October 2	
Dorka Juhász	WNBA All-Rookie Team	October 2	
