= 2023 WNBA All-Star Game =

Exhibition basketball game

	1	2	3	4	Total
Team Stewart	29	44	37	33	143
Team Wilson	27	36	30	34	127
- Date: July 15, 2023
- Arena: Michelob Ultra Arena
- City: Las Vegas, Nevada
- MVP: Jewell Loyd
- Halftime show: Kehlani
- Attendance: 9,472
- Network: United States: ABC; Canada: TSN4/SN360
- Announcers: Ryan Ruocco, Rebecca Lobo, Holly Rowe, LaChina Robinson, Carolyn Peck

WNBA All-Star Game
< 2022	2024 >

The 2023 WNBA All-Star Game was an exhibition basketball game played on July 15, 2023, at Michelob Ultra Arena. The Las Vegas Aces hosted the game and related events for the third time - the previous games being in 2019 and 2021.

A'ja Wilson, of the Las Vegas Aces was the overall leader in fan votes with 95,860, with Breanna Stewart, of the New York Liberty, finishing in 2nd with 87,586 votes.

On July 13, 2023, it was announced that Kehlani would be performing the Half-Time Show.

== Rosters ==
=== Selection ===
On June 5, the WNBA announced that 2023 would have a similar roster selection process to the 2022 WNBA All-Star Game. Fans, WNBA players, head coaches, sports writers, and broadcasters would all be able to vote for All Stars. All groups could fill out a ballot of four guards and six front court players. Players and coaches could not vote for members of their own team. Voting began on June 7 at 2 p.m. ET and concluded on Wednesday, June 21 at 11:59 p.m. ET.

The voting was weighted as follows:

Voting group	Vote weight
Fans	50%
WNBA players	25%
Sports media	25%

Players were not allowed to vote for their own teammates. The top 10 players receiving votes based on this weighting would be selected to the All-Star Game. These ten players would be deemed the starters. After the announcement of the starters, the WNBA's head coaches will select the 12 reserves. Coaches will vote for three guards, five frontcourt players, and four players at either position regardless of conference. They could not vote for their own players. The top two vote-getters will be captains of the two All-Star teams and will select their teams from the pool of 8 remaining starters and the 12 reserves. The captains will draft their respective rosters by selecting first from the remaining eight players in the pool of starters and then from the pool of 12 reserves. ESPN may broadcast the WNBA All-Star Team Selection Special.

==== Fan vote results ====
The following is the top 30 players based on fan voting alone.

Rank	Player	Number of Votes
1	A'ja Wilson	95,860
2	Breanna Stewart	87,586
3	Brittney Griner	72,637
4	Aliyah Boston	72,294
5	Jackie Young	63,262
6	Satou Sabally	60,738
7	Jewell Loyd	59,312
8	Nneka Ogwumike	50,753
9	Elena Delle Donne	49,137
10	Arike Ogunbowale	46,609
11	Kelsey Plum	44,014
12	Chelsea Gray	43,165
13	Candace Parker	42,617
14	Sabrina Ionescu	36,709
15	Napheesa Collier	30,680

Rank	Player	Number of Votes
16	Diana Taurasi	29,712
17	Alyssa Thomas	29,481
18	DeWanna Bonner	28,763
19	Allisha Gray	27,767
20	Kahleah Copper	27,546
21	Shakira Austin	22,837
22	Kelsey Mitchell	20,627
23	Courtney Vandersloot	20,252
24	NaLyssa Smith	19,485
25	Rhyne Howard	19,311
26	Marina Mabrey	15,494
27	Alysha Clark	14,146
28	Brionna Jones	13,668
29	Cheyenne Parker	13,637
30	Jonquel Jones	13,609

==== Full voting results ====
The following are the overall scores for the Top 10 finishers – based on the results from all three voting groups. The fans votes are weighed at 50%, while votes from the media and players are weighed 25%. The players are sorted by their positions. The top four players at the guards and the top 6 players at the frontcourt positions were deemed the starters for the game. After the release of the voting results, the leagues head coaches will select the twelve All-Star reserves by voting for three guards, five frontcourt players, and four players at either position. The results of this vote was announced on July 1, 2023.

Guards
Position	Player	Team	Fan Rank	Media Rank	Player Rank	Weighted Score
1	Jackie Young	Las Vegas Aces	1	1	2	1.25
2	Jewell Loyd	Seattle Storm	2	2	1	1.75
3	Arike Ogunbowale	Dallas Wings	3	3	3	3.0
4	Chelsea Gray	Las Vegas Aces	5	4	4	4.5
5	Kelsey Plum	Las Vegas Aces	4	7	8	5.75
6	Allisha Gray	Atlanta Dream	8	5	6	6.75
7	Kahleah Copper	Chicago Sky	9	7	9	8.5
8	Sabrina Ionescu	New York Liberty	6	6	19	9.25
9	Diana Taurasi	Phoenix Mercury	7	10	14	9.5
10	Kelsey Mitchell	Indiana Fever	10	13	5	9.5

Frontcourt
Position	Player	Team	Fan Rank	Media Rank	Player Rank	Weighted Score
1	A'ja Wilson	Las Vegas Aces	1	2	2	1.5
2	Breanna Stewart	New York Liberty	2	1	1	1.5
3	Brittney Griner	Phoenix Mercury	3	6	3	3.75
4	Satou Sabally	Dallas Wings	5	3	4	4.25
5	Aliyah Boston	Indiana Fever	4	7	6	5.25
6	Nneka Ogwumike	Los Angeles	6	5	5	5.5
7	Alyssa Thomas	Connecticut Sun	10	4	7	7.75
8	Elena Delle Donne	Washington	7	9	9	8.0
9	Napheesa Collier	Minnesota	9	8	8	8.5
10	DeWanna Bonner	Connecticut Sun	11	10	10	10.5

=== Head coaches ===
The head coaches for the AT&T WNBA All-Star 2023 will be the head coaches of the two teams regardless of conference with the best records following games on Friday, June 30. The head coach with the best record as of that date will coach the team whose captain earned the most fan votes.

Becky Hammon, coach of the Las Vegas Aces, and Stephanie White, coach of the Connecticut Sun, qualified to be the two head coaches for the 2023 All-Star Game. They earned the right to be the coaches as they guided their teams to the top two spots in the standings as of that date. This is Hammon's second time and White first time as head coaches in the All-Star game. White had previous been an assistant coach for the Western Conference Team in the 2013 game. Hammon coached Team Wilson due to having the best record at the date coaches were chosen and Wilson having the most votes. White coached Team Stewart.

=== All-Star pool ===
The players for the all-star Game were selected by the voting process described above. The starters for the game were announced on June 25, 2023, with A'ja Wilson of the Las Vegas Aces and Breanna Stewart of the New York Liberty leading in fan votes. Those two were named captains for the game. This was Wilson and Stewarts fifth time being named to the All-Star team.

The Western Conference provided the majority of the all-star starters with eight of the starters being from that conference. Brittney Griner of the Phoenix Mercury was selected for the ninth time, and she was joined the in starting front court by Satou Sabally of the Dallas Wings, Aliyah Boston of the Indiana Fever, and Nneka Ogwumike of the Los Angeles Sparks. This was Sabally's second selection, Boston's first, and Ogwumike's eighth. The starting front court consisted of Jackie Young and Chelsea Gray of the Las Vegas Aces, Jewell Loyd of the Seattle Storm and Arike Ogunbowale of the Dallas Wings. Gray, and Loyd have earned five all-star game selections, while it was Ogunbowale's third and Young's second selections.

Opposite of the starters, the Eastern Conference provide the majority of the All-Star reserves with nine of the twelve reserves coming from that conference. Elena Delle Donne of the Washington Mystics was selected for the seventh time, joined in the front court by Alyssa Thomas and DeWanna Bonner of the Connecticut Sun, Cheyenne Parker of the Atlanta Dream, Napheesa Collier of the Minnesota Lynx, and Ezi Magbegor of the Seattle Storm. This was Thomas's fourth selection, Bonner's fifth, Collier's third, and Parker and Magbegor's first. The backcourt reserves consisted of Kahleah Copper of the Chicago Sky, Allisha Gray of the Atlanta Dream, Sabrina Ionescu and Courtney Vandersloot of the New York Liberty, Kelsey Mitchell of the Indiana Fever, and Kelsey Plum of the Las Vegas Aces. Vandersloot earned her fifth All-Star selection, Cooper earned her third, while Ionescu and Plum earned their second. Gray and Mitchell were named to their first All-Star game.

Delle Donne was announced out for the game following an ankle injury on July 11. Rhyne Howard of the Atlanta Dream was selected as her replacement. This is Howard's second All-Star selection.

Eastern Conference All-Stars
Pos	Player	Team	No. of selections
Starters
C	Aliyah Boston	Indiana Fever	1
F	Breanna Stewart	New York Liberty	5
Reserves
G	Kahleah Copper	Chicago Sky	3
G	Allisha Gray	Atlanta Dream	1
G	Sabrina Ionescu	New York Liberty	2
G	Kelsey Mitchell	Indiana Fever	1
G	Courtney Vandersloot	New York Liberty	5
F	Alyssa Thomas	Connecticut Sun	4
F	Elena Delle Donne^{INJ1}	Washington Mystics	7
F	DeWanna Bonner	Connecticut Sun	5
F	Cheyenne Parker	Atlanta Dream	1
F	Rhyne Howard^{REP1}	Atlanta Dream	2

Western Conference All-Stars
Pos	Player	Team	No. of selections
Starters
C	Brittney Griner	Phoenix Mercury	9
F	Nneka Ogwumike	Los Angeles Sparks	8
F	Satou Sabally	Dallas Wings	2
G	Chelsea Gray	Las Vegas Aces	5
G	Jewell Loyd	Seattle Storm	5
F	A'ja Wilson	Las Vegas Aces	5
G	Arike Ogunbowale	Dallas Wings	3
G	Jackie Young	Las Vegas Aces	2
Reserves
G	Kelsey Plum	Las Vegas Aces	2
F	Napheesa Collier	Minnesota Lynx	3
F	Ezi Magbegor	Seattle Storm	1

=== All-Star selections per team ===
Number of All-Star players per team
Team	Number of players
Atlanta Dream	3
Chicago Sky	1
Connecticut Sun	2
Indiana Fever	2
New York Liberty	3
Washington Mystics	1
Dallas Wings	2
Las Vegas Aces	4
Los Angeles Sparks	1
Minnesota Lynx	1
Phoenix Mercury	1
Seattle Storm	2

=== Draft ===
The WNBA-All Star draft took place on July 8, 2023. A'ja Wilson and Breanna Stewart were named captain respectively as they received the most fan votes. The first six players to be drafted were starters. The next 12 players, chosen by WNBA head coaches were then drafted. Wilson began the draft of the starters due to her having the most votes, while Stewart began the draft of the reserves.

2023 All-Star Draft
Pick	Player	Team
1	Chelsea Gray	Wilson
2	Brittney Griner	Stewart
3	Jackie Young	Wilson
4	Jewell Loyd	Stewart
5	Aliyah Boston	Wilson
6	Satou Sabally	Stewart
7	Arike Ogunbowale	Wilson
8	Nneka Ogwumike	Stewart
9	Courtney Vandersloot	Stewart
10	Kelsey Plum	Wilson
11	Sabrina Ionescu	Stewart
12	Allisha Gray	Wilson
13	Ezi Magbegor	Stewart
14	Alyssa Thomas	Wilson
15	Napheesa Collier	Stewart
16	Cheyenne Parker	Wilson
17	Kelsey Mitchell	Stewart
18	DeWanna Bonner	Wilson
19	Kahleah Copper	Stewart
20	Elena Delle Donne	Wilson

=== Final rosters ===
Team Stewart
Pos	Player	Team	No. of selections
Starters
G	Jewell Loyd	Seattle Storm	5
F	Satou Sabally	Dallas Wings	2
F	Breanna Stewart	New York Liberty	5
F	Nneka Ogwumike	Los Angeles Sparks	8
C	Brittney Griner	Phoenix Mercury	9
Reserves
G	Kahleah Copper	Chicago Sky	3
G	Sabrina Ionescu	New York Liberty	2
G	Kelsey Mitchell	Indiana Fever	1
G	Courtney Vandersloot	New York Liberty	5
F	Napheesa Collier	Minnesota Lynx	3
F	Ezi Magbegor	Seattle Storm	1
Head coach: Stephanie White (Connecticut Sun)

Team Wilson
Pos	Player	Team	No. of selections
Starters
G	Chelsea Gray	Las Vegas Aces	5
G	Jackie Young	Las Vegas Aces	2
G	Arike Ogunbowale	Dallas Wings	3
F	A'ja Wilson	Las Vegas Aces	5
C	Aliyah Boston	Indiana Fever	1
Reserves
G	Allisha Gray	Atlanta Dream	1
G	Kelsey Plum	Las Vegas Aces	2
F	DeWanna Bonner	Connecticut Sun	5
F	Elena Delle Donne^{INJ1}	Washington Mystics	7
F	Cheyenne Parker	Atlanta Dream	1
F	Alyssa Thomas	Connecticut Sun	4
F	Rhyne Howard^{REP1}	Atlanta Dream	2
Head coach: Becky Hammon (Las Vegas Aces)

^INJ1 Elena Delle Donne was injured during her July 9 game against the Connecticut Sun and was ruled out of the All-Star Game.
^REP1 Rhyne Howard was selected as a replacement for Elena Delle Donne on July 11, 2023.

== Game ==
ABC, TSN4/SN360

July 15, 2023
8:30 p.m. ET

Report

Team Wilson 127, Team Stewart 143
Scoring by quarter: 27-29, 36-44, 30-37, 34-33
Pts: Kelsey Plum (30); Rebs: Aliyah Boston (11); Asts: Chelsea Gray (7)	Pts: Jewell Loyd (31); Rebs: Brittney Griner (13); Asts: Breanna Stewart (9)

Michelob Ultra Arena, Las Vegas, Nevada
Attendance: 9,472
Referees: Eric Brewton, Ashley Gloss, Randy Richardson

=== Rule changes ===
The WNBA put in three new rules for the 2022 All-Star Game and brought them back for the 2023 All-Star Game:

- 4-Point Shot
  - Four circles – two at each end of the court – were placed above the current three-point line
- 20-Second Shot Clock
- Automatic Points for Free-Throw Attempts: “No Free-Throws”

== Three-Point Contest & Skills Challenge ==
On January 12, 2023, it was announced that there will be a Three-Point Contest and Skills Challenge on July 14, the night before the All-Star game. It will be televised on ESPN in the US and on TSN1/4/5 in Canada. The Three-Point Contest is presented by Starry, while the WNBA Skills Challenge is presented by Kia.

=== Three-Point Contest ===
The contestants for the three-point contest were announced on July 13, 2023. DiJonai Carrington and Sami Whitcomb were not selected to the All-Star game, but were selected to participate in the three point contest. The competition is two rounds, with the top three finishers from the first round advancing. Competitors have one minute & 10 seconds & 27 balls to accumulate points. Four racks contain four regular balls worth one point and one "money ball" worth two points. One rack is all money balls. In the event of ties, there will be multiple 30-second tiebreakers before a winner is determined.

Sabrina Ionescu won the three point contest by virtue of scoring 37 of a possible 40 points in the final round. She made 20 consecutive shots during the round and only missed 2 total shots. Ionescu's 37-point final round was the highest-scoring round by a WNBA or NBA player – the previous WNBA record was 30, which Allie Quigley set in Chicago in 2022, while the previous NBA record was 31, which Stephen Curry set in Atlanta in 2021 and which Tyrese Haliburton equaled in Salt Lake City in 2023.

Position	Player	From	2023 Season 3-point statistics			1st Round	2nd Round
Position	Player	From	Made	Attempted	Percent	1st Round	2nd Round
G	Sabrina Ionescu	New York	54	121	44.6	26	37
G	Sami Whitcomb	Seattle	37	101	36.6	28	24
G	Arike Ogunbowale	Dallas	51	171	29.8	21	11
G	DiJonai Carrington	Connecticut	14	36	38.9	18	DNQ
G	Kelsey Mitchell	Indiana	48	129	37.2	15	DNQ
G	Jackie Young	Las Vegas	50	103	48.5	15	DNQ

=== Skills Challenge ===
On July 11, the WNBA announced that the skills challenge will consist of four teams of two players. Each team will consist of players selected for the All-Star Game from the same team. Teams will compete in a two-round, timed, obstacle course, relay competition that tests agility, dribbling, passing, and shooting skills. The first round will feature all four teams competing one at a time in a race against the clock. As each team goes on the clock, Player 1 will complete the obstacle course and will be followed by their teammate, Player 2. The two teams that successfully complete the course with the fastest times will advance to the final round and compete on the same course for the championship. In the event of a tie, if necessary to determine a team that will advance to the final round or determine the champion, the tied teams shall repeat the course.

Team Aces and Team Liberty advanced following the First Round of Action with Team Aces having the best time. During the Final Round, Team Liberty went first and posted 58.0 seconds. Team Aces went second and had no problem beating the Team Liberty time. Team Aces posted a 45.9 second final round time - beating the Liberty by 13.7 seconds. Kelsey Plum and Chelsea Gray were crowned the winners of the WNBA Skills Challenge.

Skills Competitors
Position	Player	Team
G	Chelsea Gray	Las Vegas
G	Kelsey Plum	Las Vegas
G	Allisha Gray	Atlanta
F	Cheyenne Parker	Atlanta
G	Sabrina Ionescu	New York
G	Courtney Vandersloot	New York
G	Arike Ogunbowale	Dallas
F	Satou Sabally	Dallas

==== Skills Challenge Results ====
Team	Round 1	Round 2
Team Aces	45.9	44.3
Team Liberty	47.8	58.0
Team Wings	52.6	DNQ
Team Dream	58.7	DNQ
