= 2023 New York Liberty season =

WNBA season

- Head coach: Sandy Brondello
- Arena: Barclays Center

Results
- Record: 32–8 (.800)
- Place: 1st (Eastern)
- Playoff finish: WNBA Finals (lost to Las Vegas 1–3)

Media
- Television: YES Network; WWOR-TV (1 game)

The 2023 New York Liberty season was the 27th season for the New York Liberty franchise of the Women's National Basketball Association (WNBA), and their second season under head coach Sandy Brondello.

The Liberty entered the season with high expectations after trading for former MVP Jonquel Jones and signing last year's MVP Breanna Stewart as a free agent. They also signed Courtney Vandersloot, who lead the league in assists for six of the past seven seasons. The team started with an opening day hiccup as they lost to Washington, but would come back to win the rest of their May games to finish the month 3–1. They would start June splitting a back-to-back with Chicago, before winning two of their next three games. They would win four straight before losing the final game of the month to finish June 7–3. The Liberty started July with another four-game winning streak, only for it to be broken at home by Dallas. The Liberty went on another four-game winning streak before losing a make-up game to Minnesota. They would win the final game of the month to finish 9–2 in July. The team managed to extend the winning streak past four this time, as they won five straight to open August. During this streak, they secured a playoff berth on August 11. In their sixth game of the month, they defeated the Las Vegas Aces to win the Commissioner's Cup, which was the first trophy in franchise history. The Liberty's next regular season game was again against the Aces, and they would lose to end their winning streak. They won their remaining four games in August to finish the month 9–1. They won their first four games in September, and headed into the final game of the season to clinch the best record in the WNBA, but lost the season finale to finish 4–1 in September.

The Liberty finished the regular season 32–8 overall and were the second seed in the 2023 WNBA Playoffs. Their 32 wins were the most in the regular season in team history, bettering the 23 wins from 2015. However, this was the first season the WNBA played a 40-game schedule. Their winning percentage of .800 was the best in franchise history, bettering the .676 mark, also from 2015.

As the second seed in the playoffs, New York faced off against the seventh seeded Washington Mystics, and New York hosted the first two games of the three-game series. The Mystics got off to a hot start in Game One, but the Liberty dominated the final three quarters and won the game 90–75. The Liberty lead Game Two by eleven at the half, but the Mystics stormed back and forced overtime. The Liberty won the overtime period and the game 90–86 to move on to the Semifinals. There, they faced off against the third seed Connecticut Sun. The Liberty lost Game One of the series 63–78. They responded in Game Two and overcame a first quarter deficit to win 84–77. In the pivotal Game Three in Connecticut, the Liberty rode a dominant first quarter to a 92–81 victory to advance to the 2023 WNBA Finals.

The Liberty faced a familiar foe in the finals, the Las Vegas Aces. The two teams squared off five times during the regular season, with the series finishing 2–2, but the Liberty taking the Commissioner's Cup. Game One of the series, was led by the Liberty by three at halftime, but the Aces dominated the second half to win 99–82. The Aces won Game Two 104–76 and left the Liberty needing to win three straight games to become WNBA Champions. The Liberty mounted a comeback in Game Three in New York and won 87–73. Game Four started well for the Liberty, they won the first quarter by ten points, but they could not hold on and lost the game 69–70. They lost the Finals one game to three, and finished runners-up.

After the season, the Liberty were fined $25,000 while Sabrina Ionescu, Betnijah Laney, and Jonquel Jones were each fined $2,000 for violating media policies.

== Transactions ==
=== WNBA draft ===
Round	Pick	Player	Nationality	School/Team/Country
3	30	Okako Adika	United States	USC

=== Transactions ===
Date	Transaction
December 31, 2022	Renounced the rights to Kylee Shook and Nayo Raincock-Ekunwe
January 12, 2023	Extended Qualifying Offers to Crystal Dangerfield, Marine Johannès, and Han Xu
January 16, 2023	Traded Rebecca Allen and the 6th Pick in the 2023 WNBA draft to the Connecticut Sun, and Natasha Howard and Crystal Dangerfield to the Dallas Wings, as part of a 3-Team Trade. The Liberty received Jonquel Jones from the Sun and Kayla Thornton from the Wings.
February 8, 2023	Signed Breanna Stewart to a 1-Year Deal
February 8, 2023	Signed Courtney Vandersloot to a 2-Year Deal
February 8, 2023	Signed Epiphanny Prince to a Training Camp Contract
February 10, 2023	Signed Sika Koné to a Rookie Scale Contract
February 11, 2023	Acquired the rights to Leonie Fiebich, a 2024 Second-Round Pick (from Chicago, and the right to swap 2025 First-Round Picks with Phoenix in a 4-Team Trade involving the Chicago Sky, Dallas Wings, and the Phoenix Mercury
February 17, 2023	Signed Han Xu to the Qualifying Offer - Training Camp Contract
February 28, 2023	Signed Nyara Sabally to a Rookie Scale Contract
March 2, 2023	Signed Marine Johannès to her Qualifying Offer
March 21, 2023	Signed Morgan Green and Stephanie Mawuli to Training Camp Contracts
May 14, 2023	Signed Sabrina Ionescu to Contract Extension
May 16, 2023	Decline Team Option on Didi Richards
May 16, 2023	Waived Didi Richards, Morgan Green, Sika Koné, and Stephanie Mawuli
May 17, 2023	Waived Epiphanny Prince
May 18, 2023	Temporarily suspend the contract of Marine Johannès due to Overseas Commitments
May 19, 2023	Signed Epiphanny Prince to a Hardship Contract
May 24, 2023	Released Epiphanny Prince from the Hardship Contract
May 30, 2023	Activated Marine Johannès
June 13, 2023	Temporarily suspend the contract of Han Xu due to Overseas Commitments
June 17, 2023	Signed Epiphanny Prince to a Hardship Contract
June 20, 2023	Released Epiphanny Prince from the Hardship Contract
June 25, 2023	Signed Epiphanny Prince to a Hardship Contract
July 5, 2023	Activated the temporarily suspended contract of Han Xu due to Overseas Commitments
July 16, 2023	Temporarily suspend the contract of Han Xu due to Overseas Commitments
August 10, 2023	Released Epiphanny Prince from the Hardship Contract
August 12, 2023	Activated the temporarily suspended contract of Han Xu due to Overseas Commitments
August 31, 2023	Signed Kayla Thornton to a Contract Extension
September 9, 2023	Signed Betnijah Laney to a Contract Extension
September 10, 2023	Temporarily suspend the contract of Han Xu due to Overseas Commitments

=== Roster changes ===
==== Additions ====
Personnel	Signed/Traded	Former team
Jonquel Jones	Traded	Connecticut Sun
Kayla Thornton	Traded	Dallas Wings
Breanna Stewart	Signed	Seattle Storm
Courtney Vandersloot	Signed	Chicago Sky
Nyara Sabally	Draft Pick	2022 Draft Pick

==== Subtractions ====
Personnel	Reason	New team
Natasha Howard	Traded	Dallas Wings
Crystal Dangerfield	Traded	Dallas Wings
Rebecca Allen	Traded	Connecticut Sun
Sami Whitcomb	Free Agency	Seattle Storm
Michaela Onyenwere	Trade	Phoenix Mercury
Didi Richards	Waived	-

== Roster ==
2023 New York Liberty roster
Players
Coaches

Pos.	No.	Nat.	Name	Height	Weight	DOB	From	Yrs
C	31	(United States)	Dolson, Stefanie	6' 5" (1.96m)	235 lb (107kg)	1992-01-08	Connecticut	9
G	20	(United States)	Ionescu, Sabrina	5' 11" (1.8m)	165 lb (75kg)	1997-12-06	Oregon	3
G	23	(France)	Johannès, Marine	5' 10" (1.78m)	134 lb (61kg)	1995-01-21	France	2
F/C	35	(Bosnia and Herzegovina)	Jones, Jonquel	6' 6" (1.98m)	215 lb (98kg)	1994-01-05	George Washington	6
G/F	44	(United States)	Laney, Betnijah	6' 0" (1.83m)	166 lb (75kg)	1993-10-29	Rutgers	7
F	8	(Germany)	Sabally, Nyara	6' 5" (1.96m)	204 lb (93kg)	2000-02-26	Oregon	1
F	30	(United States)	Stewart, Breanna	6' 4" (1.93m)	170 lb (77kg)	1994-08-27	Connecticut	6
F	5	(United States)	Thornton, Kayla	6' 1" (1.85m)	188 lb (85kg)	1992-10-20	UTEP	7
G	22	(Hungary)	Vandersloot, Courtney	5' 8" (1.73m)	137 lb (62kg)	1989-02-08	Gonzaga	12
G/F	13	(United States)	Willoughby, Jocelyn	6' 0" (1.83m)	180 lb (82kg)	1998-03-25	Virginia	2
C	21	(China)	Xu, Han	6' 10" (2.08m)	193 lb (88kg)	1999-10-31	China	2

Head coach
(Australia) Sandy Brondello (Western Sydney)
Assistant coaches
(Germany) Olaf Lange
(United States) Roneeka Hodges (Florida State)
(United States) Zach O'Brien (Saint Joseph's College of Maine)
Athletic trainer
(United States) Terri Acosta
Strength and conditioning coach
(United States) Emily Zaler

Legend

- (C) Team captain
- (DP) Unsigned draft pick
- (FA) Free agent
- (S) Suspended
- Injured

=== Depth ===
Pos.	Starter	Bench
PG	Courtney Vandersloot
SG	Sabrina Ionescu	Marine Johannès
SF	Betnijah Laney	Kayla Thornton; Jocelyn Willoughby
PF	Breanna Stewart	Nyara Sabally
C	Jonquel Jones	Stefanie Dolson; Han Xu

== Schedule ==
=== Preseason ===
2023 pre-season game log
Total: 0–2 (Home: 0–0; Road: 0–2)
May: 0–2 (Home: 0–0; Road: 0–2)

Game	Date	Team	Score	High points	High rebounds	High assists	Location Attendance	Record
1	May 10	@ Connecticut	L 57–63	Sika Koné (10)	Kayla Thornton (8)	Stefanie Dolson (4)	Mohegan Sun Arena; N/A	0–1
2	May 13	@ Las Vegas	L 77–84	Ionescu; Laney (14)	Breanna Stewart (7)	Breanna Stewart (5)	Michelob Ultra Arena; 4,460	0–2

2023 pre-season schedule

=== Regular season ===
2023 game log
Total: 32–8 (Home: 15–5; Road: 17–3)
May: 3–1 (Home: 2–0; Road: 1–1)

Game	Date	Team	Score	High points	High rebounds	High assists	Location Attendance	Record
1	May 19	@ Washington	L 64–80	Sabrina Ionescu (18)	Breanna Stewart (12)	Courtney Vandersloot (6)	Entertainment and Sports Arena; 4,200	0–1
2	May 21	Indiana	W 90–73	Breanna Stewart (45)	Breanna Stewart (12)	Ionsecu; Vandersloot (8)	Barclays Center; 8,575	1–1
3	May 27	Connecticut	W 81–65	Breanna Stewart (21)	Ionsecu; Thornton (7)	Courtney Vandersloot (10)	Barclays Center; 7,102	2–1
4	May 30	@ Seattle	W 86–78	Breanna Stewart (25)	Breanna Stewart (11)	Courtney Vandersloot (11)	Climate Pledge Arena; 8,340	3–1

June : 7–3 (Home: 3–2; Road: 4–1)

Game	Date	Team	Score	High points	High rebounds	High assists	Location Attendance	Record
5	June 2	@ Chicago	W 77–76	Breanna Stewart (19)	Breanna Stewart (11)	Courtney Vandersloot (8)	Wintrust Arena; 7,188	4–1
6	June 4	Chicago	L 82–86	Breanna Stewart (20)	Breanna Stewart (11)	Courtney Vandersloot (10)	Barclays Center; 7,225	4–2
7	June 7	Minnesota	Postponed until July 28 due to poor air quality				Barclays Center	
8	June 9	@ Atlanta	W 106–83	Sabrina Ionescu (37)	Breanna Stewart (9)	Courtney Vandersloot (11)	Gateway Center Arena; 3,209	5–2
9	June 11	Dallas	W 102–93	Breanna Stewart (32)	Breanna Stewart (9)	Courtney Vandersloot (10)	Barclays Center; 7,615	6–2
10	June 13	Atlanta	L 79–86	Marine Johannès (18)	Breanna Stewart (13)	Stewart; Vandersloot (6)	Barclays Center; 5,719	6–3
11	June 18	Phoenix	W 89–71	Breanna Stewart (28)	Breanna Stewart (14)	Breanna Stewart (7)	Barclays Center; 9,278	7–3
12	June 23	@ Atlanta	W 110–80	Betnijah Laney (19)	Breanna Stewart (11)	Courtney Vandersloot (11)	Gateway Center Arena; 3,209	8–3
13	June 25	Washington	W 89–88 (OT)	Sabrina Ionescu (31)	Jonquel Jones (10)	Ionescu; Vandersloot (6)	Barclays Center; 7,285	9–3
14	June 27	@ Connecticut	W 89–81	Breanna Stewart (24)	Jonquel Jones (11)	Courtney Vandersloot (9)	Mohegan Sun Arena; 7,344	10–3
15	June 29	@ Las Vegas	L 81–98	Breanna Stewart (16)	Ionescu; Jones (6)	Sabrina Ionescu (7)	Michelob Ultra Arena; 9,587	10–4

July : 9–2 (Home: 5–2; Road: 4–0)

Game	Date	Team	Score	High points	High rebounds	High assists	Location Attendance	Record
16	July 2	@ Seattle	W 81–66	Breanna Stewart (20)	Breanna Stewart (8)	Courtney Vandersloot (13)	Climate Pledge Arena; 9,110	11–4
17	July 5	Phoenix	W 99–95	Breanna Stewart (43)	Breanna Stewart (12)	Sabrina Ionescu (9)	Barclays Center; 7,151	12–4
18	July 8	Seattle	W 80–76	Breanna Stewart (25)	Breanna Stewart (8)	Sabrina Ionescu (8)	Barclays Center; 6,789	13–4
19	July 12	@ Indiana	W 95–87 (OT)	Sabrina Ionescu (34)	Breanna Stewart (10)	Courtney Vandersloot (12)	Gainbridge Fieldhouse; 6,123	14–4
20	July 19	Dallas	L 88–98	Breanna Stewart (25)	Jonquel Jones (9)	Courtney Vandersloot (7)	Barclays Center; 9,012	14–5
21	July 21	@ Washington	W 96–87	Jonquel Jones (27)	Ionescu; Jones (11)	Sabrina Ionescu (9)	Entertainment and Sports Arena; 4,200	15–5
22	July 23	Indiana	W 101–83	Betnijah Laney (22)	Jonquel Jones (11)	Courtney Vandersloot (10)	Barclays Center; 7,371	16–5
23	July 25	Seattle	W 86–82	Breanna Stewart (22)	Jonquel Jones (17)	Sabrina Ionescu (12)	Barclays Center; 6,118	17–5
24	July 27	Atlanta	W 95–84	Breanna Stewart (33)	Jonquel Jones (13)	Sabrina Ionescu (9)	Barclays Center; 6,206	18–5
7	July 28	Minnesota	L 83–88	Breanna Stewart (23)	Jonquel Jones (11)	Sabrina Ionescu (7)	Barclays Center; 6,129	18–6
25	July 30	@ Los Angeles	W 87–79	Breanna Stewart (25)	Jonquel Jones (13)	Courtney Vandersloot (9)	Crypto.com Arena; 8,139	19–6

August : 9–1 (Home: 3–0; Road: 6–1)

Game	Date	Team	Score	High points	High rebounds	High assists	Location Attendance	Record
26	August 1	@ Los Angeles	W 76–69	Courtney Vandersloot (23)	Breanna Stewart (12)	Courtney Vandersloot (6)	Crypto.com Arena; 6,498	20–6
27	August 4	@ Minnesota	W 76–66	Sabrina Ionescu (18)	Jonquel Jones (17)	Courtney Vandersloot (7)	Target Center; 7,631	21–6
28	August 6	Las Vegas	W 99–61	Sabrina Ionescu (31)	Jonquel Jones (14)	Sabrina Ionescu (7)	Barclays Center; 11,418	22–6
29	August 11	Chicago	W 89–73	Breanna Stewart (21)	Breanna Stewart (12)	Sabrina Ionescu (8)	Barclays Center; 8,070	23–6
30	August 13	@ Indiana	W 100–89	Breanna Stewart (42)	Jonquel Jones (12)	Courtney Vandersloot (14)	Gainbridge Fieldhouse; 5,019	24–6
Commissioner's Cup Final	August 15	@ Las Vegas	W 82–63	Marine Johannès (17)	Jonquel Jones (15)	Courtney Vandersloot (10)	Michelob Ultra Arena; 8,967	—
31	August 17	@ Las Vegas	L 75–88	Sabrina Ionescu (22)	Jonquel Jones (8)	Courtney Vandersloot (7)	Michelob Ultra Arena; 9,230	24–7
32	August 18	@ Phoenix	W 85–63	Betnijah Laney (22)	Breanna Stewart (8)	Courtney Vandersloot (8)	Footprint Center; 9,652	25–7
33	August 24	@ Connecticut	W 95–90 (OT)	Breanna Stewart (24)	Jonquel Jones (14)	Courtney Vandersloot (8)	Mohegan Sun Arena; 9,168	26–7
34	August 26	@ Minnesota	W 111–76	Breanna Stewart (38)	Breanna Stewart (11)	Courtney Vandersloot (9)	Target Center; 7,101	27–7
35	August 28	Las Vegas	W 94–85	Sabrina Ionescu (25)	Breanna Stewart (12)	Courtney Vandersloot (10)	Barclays Center; 11,615	28–7

September : 4–1 (Home: 2–1; Road: 2–0)

Game	Date	Team	Score	High points	High rebounds	High assists	Location Attendance	Record
36	September 1	Connecticut	W 89–58	Betnijah Laney (19)	Breanna Stewart (10)	Breanna Stewart (7)	Barclays Center; 8,276	29–7
37	September 3	@ Chicago	W 86–69	Breanna Stewart (26)	Breanna Stewart (14)	Courtney Vandersloot (10)	Wintrust Arena; 8,223	30–7
38	September 5	@ Dallas	W 94–93	Breanna Stewart (40)	Breanna Stewart (10)	Courtney Vandersloot (10)	College Park Center; 4,195	31–7
39	September 7	Los Angeles	W 96–89	Breanna Stewart (25)	Jonquel Jones (9)	Courtney Vandersloot (10)	Barclays Center; 6,275	32–7
40	September 10	Washington	L 88–90	Sabrina Ionescu (20)	Jonquel Jones (9)	Sabrina Ionescu (7)	Barclays Center; 8,306	32–8

2023 season schedule

=== Playoffs ===
2023 playoff game log
First round vs. Washington
Won Series: 2–0

Game	Date	Team	Score	High points	High rebounds	High assists	Location Attendance	Series
1	September 15	Washington	W 90–75	Sabrina Ionescu (29)	Jonquel Jones (12)	Courtney Vandersloot (6)	Barclays Center; 8,789	1–0
2	September 19	Washington	W 90–85 (OT)	Breanna Stewart (27)	Jonquel Jones (14)	Courtney Vandersloot (10)	Barclays Center; 9,256	2–0

Semifinals vs. Connecticut Sun
Won Series: 3–1

Game	Date	Team	Score	High points	High rebounds	High assists	Location Attendance	Series
1	September 24	Connecticut	L 63–78	Breanna Stewart (19)	Jonquel Jones (11)	Courtney Vandersloot (7)	Barclays Center; 9,442	0–1
2	September 26	Connecticut	W 84–77	Sabrina Ionescu (21)	Jonquel Jones (13)	Ionescu; Stewart (5)	Barclays Center; 10,009	1–1
3	September 29	@ Connecticut	W 92–81	Breanna Stewart (25)	Jonquel Jones (12)	Courtney Vandersloot (7)	Mohegan Sun Arena; 9,162	2–1
4	October 1	@ Connecticut	W 87–84	Breanna Stewart (27)	Jonquel Jones (15)	Ionescu; Vandersloot (7)	Mohegan Sun Arena; 8,196	3–1

Finals vs. Las Vegas Aces
Lost Series: 1–3

Game	Date	Team	Score	High points	High rebounds	High assists	Location Attendance	Series
1	October 8	@ Las Vegas	L 82–99	Breanna Stewart (21)	Jonquel Jones (10)	Courtney Vandersloot (6)	Michelob Ultra Arena; 10,300	0–1
2	October 11	@ Las Vegas	L 76–104	Jonquel Jones (22)	Breanna Stewart (13)	Betnijah Laney (5)	Michelob Ultra Arena; 10,232	0–2
3	October 15	Las Vegas	W 87–73	Jonquel Jones (27)	Breanna Stewart (12)	Sabrina Ionescu (11)	Barclays Center; 17,143	1–2
4	October 18	Las Vegas	L 69–70	Courtney Vandersloot (19)	Breanna Stewart (14)	Courtney Vandersloot (6)	Barclays Center; 16,851	1–3

2023 playoff schedule

== Standings ==
#	Team	W	L	PCT	GB	Conf.	Home	Road	Cup
1	x – Las Vegas Aces	34	6	.850	–	18–2	19–1	15–5	9–1
2	x – New York Liberty	32	8	.800	2	16–4	15–5	17–3	7–3
3	x – Connecticut Sun	27	13	.675	7	14–6	13–7	14–6	7–3
4	x – Dallas Wings	22	18	.550	12	11–9	11–9	11–9	6–4
5	x – Atlanta Dream	19	21	.475	15	11–9	11–9	8–12	6–4
6	x – Minnesota Lynx	19	21	.475	15	12–8	9–11	10–10	5–5
7	x – Washington Mystics	19	21	.475	15	9–11	12–8	7–13	5–5
8	x – Chicago Sky	18	22	.450	16	5–15	7–13	11–9	3–7
9	e – Los Angeles Sparks	17	23	.425	17	9–11	10–10	7–13	5–5
10	e – Indiana Fever	13	27	.325	21	5–15	6–14	7–13	2–8
11	e – Seattle Storm	11	29	.275	23	8–12	4–16	7–13	4–6
12	e – Phoenix Mercury	9	31	.225	25	2–18	8–12	1–19	1–9

Notes

(#) – League Standing
x – Clinched playoff berth
e – Eliminated from postseason contention
Source: Overall standings and Commissioner's Cup Standings

== Playoffs ==
**First round** Best-of-3
**1**	**Las Vegas Aces**	**2**
8	Chicago Sky	0
**4**	**Dallas Wings**	**2**
5	Atlanta Dream	0
**2**	**New York Liberty**	**2**
7	Washington Mystics	0
**3**	**Connecticut Sun**	**2**
6	Minnesota Lynx	1

**Semifinals**; Best-of-5
**1**	**Las Vegas Aces**	**3**
4	Dallas Wings	0
**2**	**New York Liberty**	**3**
3	Connecticut Sun	1

**Finals**; Best-of-5
1	**Las Vegas Aces**	**3**
2	New York Liberty	1

- **Bold** – Series winner
- Italic – Team with home-court advantage

== Statistics ==
Legend
GP	Games played	GS	Games started	MPG	Minutes per game	RPG	Rebounds per game
APG	Assists per game	SPG	Steals per game	BPG	Blocks per game	PPG	Points per game
FG%	Field-goal percentage	3P%	3-point field-goal percentage	FT%	Free-throw percentage	TO	Turnovers per game
PF	Fouls per game		Team leader		League leader

=== Regular season ===
Player	GP	GS	MPG	FG%	3P%	FT%	RPG	APG	SPG	BPG	PPG
Breanna Stewart	40	40	34.1	.465	.355	.851	9.3	3.8	1.5	1.6	23.0
Sabrina Ionescu	36	36	31.5	.423	.448	.872	5.6	5.4	1.0	0.3	17.0
Betnijah Laney	40	40	30.0	.499	.392	.791	3.3	2.4	0.9	0.1	12.8
Jonquel Jones	40	40	25.0	.527	.352	.863	8.4	1.8	0.6	1.3	11.3
Courtney Vandersloot	39	39	30.4	.442	.294	.761	3.5	8.1	1.3	0.6	10.5
Marine Johannès	35	5	18.9	.414	.368	.750	1.4	1.7	0.7	0.1	7.1
Kayla Thornton	40	0	17.3	.433	.313	.767	3.5	0.7	0.7	0.3	4.5
Stefanie Dolson	23	0	11.9	.515	.462	.786	2.0	1.2	0.0	0.3	4.0
Nyara Sabally	33	0	7.9	.424	.222	.750	2.1	0.2	0.1	0.2	2.3
Epiphanny Prince^{‡}	10	0	7.1	.400	.300	1.000	0.6	0.8	0.2	0.1	1.8
Han Xu	8	0	4.5	.300	.000	.000	0.9	0.0	0.3	0.1	1.5
Jocelyn Willoughby	29	0	6.6	.400	.438	1.000	0.8	0.4	0.1	0.0	1.2

^{‡}Waived/Released during the season
^{†}Traded during the season
^{≠}Acquired during the season

=== Playoffs ===
Player	GP	GS	MPG	FG%	3P%	FT%	RPG	APG	SPG	BPG	PPG
Breanna Stewart	10	10	38.0	.358	.196	.872	10.2	3.1	1.1	1.9	18.4
Jonquel Jones	10	10	34.7	.559	.321	.787	11.6	1.7	0.7	2.4	17.0
Betnijah Laney	10	10	36.1	.473	.365	.733	4.1	3.0	0.8	0.0	15.2
Sabrina Ionescu	10	10	35.1	.393	.400	.913	4.2	4.7	0.8	0.7	13.7
Courtney Vandersloot	10	10	32.6	.420	.378	.800	3.9	6.3	1.3	0.7	10.6
Kayla Thornton	10	0	10.1	.444	.400	1.00	1.5	0.3	0.1	0.2	3.2
Marine Johannès	9	0	11.4	.276	.250	.500	0.7	0.8	0.1	0.2	2.7
Stefanie Dolson	10	0	4.6	.500	.200	.000	0.5	0.1	0.0	0.1	1.3
Jocelyn Willoughby	3	0	2.3	.000	.000	.333	0.3	0.0	0.3	0.0	0.7
Nyara Sabally	4	0	1.3	.000	.000	.000	0.0	0.3	0.3	0.0	0.0

== Awards and honors ==
Recipient	Award	Date awarded	Ref.
Breanna Stewart	Eastern Conference Player of the Week	May 30	
Breanna Stewart	Eastern Conference Player of the Week	June 13	
Breanna Stewart	Eastern Conference Player of the Week	July 13	
Breanna Stewart	Eastern Conference Player of the Week	August 1	
Breanna Stewart	Eastern Conference Player of the Week	August 15	
Breanna Stewart	Eastern Conference Player of the Week	September 4	
Breanna Stewart	Player of the Month - May	June 2	
Breanna Stewart	WNBA All-Star Starter & Captain	June 25	
Breanna Stewart	Player of the Month - July	August 2	
Breanna Stewart	Player of the Month - August	September 6	
Breanna Stewart	All-Defensive First Team	September 22	
Breanna Stewart	WNBA MVP	September 26	
Breanna Stewart	All-WNBA First Team	October 15	
Sabrina Ionescu	WNBA All-Star	July 1	
Sabrina Ionescu	All-WNBA Second Team	October 15	
Courtney Vandersloot	WNBA All-Star	July 1	
Courtney Vandersloot	Peak Performer: Assists	September 11	
Jonquel Jones	Eastern Conference Player of the Week	July 25	
Sandy Brondello	Coach of the Month - August	September 6	
Jonathan Kolb	Executive of the Year	September 14	
Betnijah Laney	All-Defensive Second Team	September 22	
