= 2023 Los Angeles Sparks season =

- Head coach: Curt Miller
- Arena: Crypto.com Arena (Capacity: 19,068)

Results
- Record: 17–23 (.425)
- Place: 4th (Western)
- Playoff finish: Did not qualify

Media
- Television: Spectrum SportsNet; ABC; ESPN; ESPN2; ESPN+ CBS; Paramount+ CBSSN; NBA TV; ION

The 2023 Los Angeles Sparks season was the 27th season for the Los Angeles Sparks of the Women's National Basketball Association (WNBA), and the first season under head coach Curt Miller. The season tipped off on May 19, 2023, versus the Phoenix Mercury.

The Sparks hired Miller on October 21, 2022. He previously served as the head for the Connecticut Sun, and led the Sun to the 2022 WNBA Finals. He also previously served as an assistant coach for the Sparks in 2015.

The Sparks won their opening game of the season before dropping the next two games to Las Vegas to finish the opening month 1–2. June was an up and down month that saw the Sparks win their first two games, but then alternate wins and losses for the next five games. They won two games in a row over Dallas but then they lost their final two games of the month to Chicago. They would ultimately finish the month 6–7. July was not as good of a month for the Sparks as they lost six games in a row to start the month. They won two games against Indiana but lost their final game of the month to finish July 2–7. August began with two losses, but then the Sparks went on a six-game winning streak. August finished with three straight losses, and the Sparks finished August 6–5. The Sparks were fighting for the eighth and final playoff seed entering September and they won their opening game. They then lost their next two games, and were eliminated from playoff contention on September 8 when they did not play, but Chicago defeated Minnesota. They won their final game of the season to finish September 2–2 and one game out of the eighth playoff spot. This marked the third straight year of the Sparks not qualifying for the playoffs.

== Transactions ==
=== WNBA draft ===
Round	Pick	Player	Nationality	School/team/country
1	10	Zia Cooke	United States	South Carolina
2	14	Shaneice Swain	Australia	Cairns Dolphins
3	26	Monika Czinano	United States	Iowa

=== Transactions ===
Date	Transaction
October 21, 2022	Hired Curt Miller as head coach
December 31, 2022	Renounced the rights to Ivana Raca
January 3, 2023	Hired Karen Bryant as Chief Administrative Officer and General Manager
January 3, 2023	Promoted Eli Horowitz to Assistant General Manager
January 4, 2023	Hired Steve Smith and Chris Koclanes as assistant coaches
January 13, 2023	Extended Qualifying Offer to Kianna Smith
January 16, 2023	Traded Olivia Nelson-Ododa, Jasmine Walker, and Kianna Smith to the Connecticut Sun in exchange for Jasmine Thomas and the 10th Overall Pick in the 2023 WNBA draft
January 21, 2023	Traded Amanda Zahui B and a 2024 Second-Round Pick to the Las Vegas Aces in exchange for Dearica Hamby and a 2024 First-Round Pick
February 1, 2023	Signed Lexie Brown to a 2-Year Deal
February 1, 2023	Signed Stephanie Talbot to a Multi-Year Deal
February 3, 2023	Signed Azurá Stevens
February 7, 2023	Signed Layshia Clarendon to a training-camp contract
February 8, 2023	Signed Jordin Canada to a training-camp contract
February 19, 2023	Signed Yang Liwei to a rookie-scale contract
February 21, 2023	Signed Karlie Samuelson and Reshanda Gray to training-camp contracts
February 22, 2023	Signed Chiney Ogwumike to a 1-Year Deal
February 24, 2023	Signed Nneka Ogwumike to a 1-Year Deal
February 28, 2023	Full-Season Suspension of Stephanie Talbot due to Overseas Injury
March 9, 2023	Hired Danielle Viglione as assistant coach
March 17, 2023	Waived Chennedy Carter
April 13, 2023	Signed Zia Cooke and Monika Czinano to rookie-scale contracts
April 13, 2023	Signed Joyner Holmes and Crystal Bradford to training-camp contracts
May 13, 2023	Waived Crystal Bradford and Reshanda Gray
May 15, 2023	Waived Monika Czinano
May 16, 2023	Waived Karlie Samuelson and Rae Burrell
May 17, 2023	Waived Yang Liwei
May 18, 2023	Claimed Nia Clouden off Waivers
May 18, 2023	Placed Katie Lou Samuelson on the Inactive List due to Pregnancy/Child-Birth
May 18, 2023	Signed Karlie Samuelson to a Hardship Contract
May 27, 2023	Signed Rae Burrell to a Hardship Contract
May 29, 2023	Released Rae Burrell from the Hardship Contract
June 5, 2023	Waived Joyner Holmes
June 5, 2023	Released Karlie Samuelson from the Hardship Contract
June 6, 2023	Signed Karlie Samuelson
June 16, 2023	Signed Destanni Henderson to a Hardship Contract
June 17, 2023	Signed Rae Burrell to a Hardship Contract
July 16, 2023	Released Destanni Henderson from the Hardship Contract
July 31, 2023	Signed Evina Westbrook to a 7-Day Contract
August 7, 2023	Signed Evina Westbrook to a 2nd 7-Day Contract
August 14, 2023	Signed Evina Westbrook to a 3rd 7-Day Contract
August 21, 2023	Signed Evina Westbrook to a Hardship Contract

=== Roster Changes ===
==== Additions ====
Personnel	Signed/Trade	Former team
Jasmine Thomas	Trade	Connecticut Sun
Dearica Hamby	Trade	Las Vegas Aces
Stephanie Talbot	Free Agency	Seattle Storm
Azurá Stevens	Free Agency	Chicago Sky
Layshia Clarendon	Free Agency	-
Karlie Samuelson	Free Agency	Townsville Fire
Zia Cooke	Draft Pick	2023 Draft Pick
Nia Clouden	Waiver Claim	Connecticut Sun
Evina Westbrook	Free Agency	Phoenix Mercury

==== Subtractions ====
Personnel	Reason	New team
Olivia Nelson-Ododa	Trade	Connecticut Sun
Jasmine Walker	Trade	Connecticut Sun
Kianna Smith	Trade	Connecticut Sun
Amanda Zahui B	Trade	Las Vegas Aces
Chennedy Carter	Waived	-
Kianna Smith	Free Agency	-
Brittney Sykes	Free Agency	Washington Mystics
Kristi Toliver	Free Agency	Washington Mystics

== Roster ==
2023 Los Angeles Sparks roster
Players
Coaches

Pos.	No.	Nat.	Name	Height	Weight	DOB	From	Yrs
G	4	(United States)	Brown, Lexie (OUT)	5' 9" (1.75m)	162 lb (73kg)	1994-10-24	Duke	5
G/F	12	(United States)	Burrell, Rae	6' 2" (1.88m)	168 lb (76kg)	2000-06-21	Tennessee	1
G	21	(United States)	Canada, Jordin	5' 6" (1.68m)	135 lb (61kg)	1995-08-11	UCLA	5
G	25	(United States)	Clarendon, Layshia	5' 9" (1.75m)	158 lb (72kg)	1991-03-02	California	9
G	2	(United States)	Clouden, Nia (injured)	5' 9" (1.75m)	139 lb (63kg)	2000-05-17	Michigan State	1
G	1	(United States)	Cooke, Zia	5' 9" (1.75m)	163 lb (74kg)	2001-01-09	South Carolina	R
F	5	(United States)	Hamby, Dearica	6' 3" (1.91m)	189 lb (86kg)	1993-11-06	Wake Forest	8
F	30	(United States)	Ogwumike, Nneka	6' 2" (1.88m)	174 lb (79kg)	1990-07-02	Stanford	11
F/C	13	(United States)	Ogwumike, Chiney (injured)	6' 3" (1.91m)	183 lb (83kg)	1992-03-21	Stanford	6
F	44	(United States)	Samuelson, Karlie	6' 0" (1.83m)	160 lb (73kg)	1995-05-10	Stanford	4
F	33	(United States)	Samuelson, Katie Lou (ML)	6' 3" (1.91m)	163 lb (74kg)	1997-06-13	Connecticut	4
F/C	23	(United States)	Stevens, Azurá	6' 6" (1.98m)	180 lb (82kg)	1996-02-01	Connecticut	5
G	15	(United States)	Thomas, Jasmine	5' 9" (1.75m)	143 lb (65kg)	1989-09-30	Duke	11
G	22	(United States)	Westbrook, Evina	6' 0" (1.83m)	158 lb (72kg)	1998-09-28	Connecticut	1

Head coach
(United States) Curt Miller (Baldwin Wallace)
Assistant coaches
(United States) Chris Koclanes (Old Dominion)
(United States) Steve Smith
(United States) Danielle Viglione (Texas)
Athletic trainer
(United States) Courtney Watson (California)
Strength and conditioning coach
(United States) Kelly Dormandy (Springfield)

Legend

- (C) Team captain
- (DP) Unsigned draft pick
- (FA) Free agent
- (S) Suspended
- Injured

=== Depth chart ===
Pos.	Starter	Bench
PG	Jordin Canada	Jasmine Thomas; Nia Clouden
SG	Layshia Clarendon	Zia Cooke; Lexie Brown
SF	Karlie Samuelson	Evina Westbrook; Rae Burrell
PF	Nneka Ogwumike	Dearica Hamby
C	Azurá Stevens	Chiney Ogwumike

== Schedule ==
=== Preseason ===
2023 pre-season game log
Total: 1–0 (Home: 0–0; Road: 1–0)
May: 1–0 (Home: 0–0; Road: 1–0)

Game	Date	Team	Score	High points	High rebounds	High assists	Location Attendance	Record
1	May 12; 7:00 p.m.	at Phoenix	W 90–71	Zia Cooke (12)	C. Ogwumike; N. Ogwumike; Holmes (4)	Canada; Liwei (5)	Footprint Center; N/A	1–0

2023 pre-season schedule

=== Regular season ===
2023 game log
Total: 17–23 (Home: 10–10; Road: 7–13)
May: 1–2 (Home: 1–1; Road: 0–1)

Game	Date	Team	Score	High points	High rebounds	High assists	Location Attendance	Record
1	May 19	Phoenix	W 94–71	Nneka Ogwumike (17)	Chiney Ogwumike (7)	Jordin Canada (5)	Crypto.com Arena; 10,396	1–0
2	May 25	Las Vegas	L 85–94	Chiney Ogwumike (19)	Chiney Ogwumike (8)	Layshia Clarendon (6)	Crypto.com Arena; 7,314	1–1
3	May 27	@ Las Vegas	L 65–93	Nneka Ogwumike (16)	Karlie Samuelson (7)	Nia Clouden (5)	Michelob Ultra Arena; 10,191	1–2

June : 6–7 (Home: 4–3; Road: 2–4)

Game	Date	Team	Score	High points	High rebounds	High assists	Location Attendance	Record
4	June 2	@ Phoenix	W 99–93 (OT)	Lexie Brown (26)	Nneka Ogwumike (12)	Nneka Ogwumike (6)	Footprint Center; 8,815	2–2
5	June 3	Seattle	W 92–83	Nneka Ogwumike (27)	Nneka Ogwumike (13)	Jordin Canada (7)	Crypto.com Arena; 6,866	3–2
6	June 6	@ Seattle	L 63–66	Nneka Ogwumike (22)	Nneka Ogwumike (11)	Jordin Canada (5)	Climate Pledge Arena; 7,840	3–3
7	June 9	Chicago	W 77–62	Nneka Ogwumike (19)	Nneka Ogwumike (14)	Canada; N. Ogwumike (5)	Crypto.com Arena; 5,431	4–3
8	June 11	@ Minnesota	L 86–91	Nneka Ogwumike (27)	Dearica Hamby (9)	Jordin Canada (8)	Target Center; 8,025	4–4
9	June 14	@ Dallas	W 79–61	Dearica Hamby (23)	Nneka Ogwumike (10)	Jordin Canada (6)	College Park Center; 5,807	5–4
10	June 16	Minnesota	L 72–77	Jordin Canada (22)	Dearica Hamby (9)	Nneka Ogwumike (7)	Crypto.com Arena; 5,265	5–5
11	June 18	Connecticut	L 74–83	Nneka Ogwumike (19)	Nneka Ogwumike (15)	Jordin Canada (6)	Crypto.com Arena; 6,289	5–6
12	June 20	Minnesota	L 61–67	Nneka Ogwumike (20)	Nneka Ogwumike (9)	Jordin Canada (5)	Crypto.com Arena; 4,180	5–7
13	June 23	Dallas	W 76–74	Nneka Ogwumike (20)	Dearica Hamby (10)	Jordin Canada (6)	Crypto.com Arena; 5,766	6–7
14	June 25	Dallas	W 93–83	Nneka Ogwumike (27)	Nneka Ogwumike (12)	Jordin Canada (9)	Crypto.com Arena; 6,380	7–7
15	June 28	@ Chicago	L 63–80	Nneka Ogwumike (16)	Nneka Ogwumike (11)	Jordin Canada (5)	Wintrust Arena; 8,810	7–8
16	June 30	@ Chicago	L 78–86	Azurá Stevens (15)	Dearica Hamby (12)	Jordin Canada (4)	Wintrust Arena; 7,272	7–9

July : 2–7 (Home: 2–3; Road: 0–4)

Game	Date	Team	Score	High points	High rebounds	High assists	Location Attendance	Record
17	July 2	@ Atlanta	L 84–112	Nneka Ogwumike (25)	Azurá Stevens (9)	Destanni Henderson (6)	Gateway Center Arena; 3,209	7–10
18	July 5	Atlanta	L 79–90	Nneka Ogwumike (19)	Azurá Stevens (12)	Jordin Canada (7)	Crypto.com Arena; 5,912	7–11
19	July 9	@ Phoenix	L 72–78	Nneka Ogwumike (20)	Nneka Ogwumike (14)	Cooke; Thomas (4)	Footprint Center; 9,206	7–12
20	July 12	Las Vegas	L 78–97	Azurá Stevens (22)	Azurá Stevens (12)	Karlie Samuelson (6)	Crypto.com Arena; 8,085	7–13
21	July 20	@ Minnesota	L 70–73	Nneka Ogwumike (19)	Nneka Ogwumike (9)	Jordin Canada (8)	Target Center; 7,014	7–14
22	July 22	@ Dallas	L 84–98	Dearica Hamby (18)	Canada; N. Ogwumike (5)	Jordin Canada (7)	College Park Center; 5,041	7–15
23	July 25	Indiana	W 79–78	Nneka Ogwumike (30)	Nneka Ogwumike (8)	Jordin Canada (10)	Crypto.com Arena; 5,565	8–15
24	July 27	Indiana	W 81–68	Nneka Ogwumike (25)	Nneka Ogwumike (9)	Jordin Canada (7)	Crypto.com Arena; 11,970	9–15
25	July 30	New York	L 79–87	Dearica Hamby (21)	Dearica Hamby (6)	Jordin Canada (4)	Crypto.com Arena; 8,139	9–16

August : 6–5 (Home: 2–3; Road: 4–2)

Game	Date	Team	Score	High points	High rebounds	High assists	Location Attendance	Record
26	August 1	New York	L 69–76	Nneka Ogwumike (20)	Nneka Ogwumike (8)	Jordin Canada (6)	Crypto.com Arena; 6,498	9–17
27	August 4	@ Washington	L 77–79	Azurá Stevens (19)	Canada; N. Ogwumike (8)	Jordin Canada (7)	Entertainment and Sports Arena; 3,747	9–18
28	August 6	@ Washington	W 91–83	Nneka Ogwumike (20)	Nneka Ogwumike (10)	Jordin Canada (7)	Entertainment and Sports Arena; 4,073	10–18
29	August 8	@ Indiana	W 87–80	Nneka Ogwumike (20)	Nneka Ogwumike (11)	Jordin Canada (7)	Gainbridge Fieldhouse; 3,006	11–18
30	August 12	Atlanta	W 85–74	Jordin Canada (20)	Azurá Stevens (8)	Jordin Canada (8)	Crypto.com Arena; 7,119	12–18
31	August 19	@ Las Vegas	W 78–72	Layshia Clarendon (22)	Nneka Ogwumike (11)	Layshia Clarendon (5)	Michelob Ultra Arena; 10,348	13–18
32	August 23	Phoenix	W 91–62	Azurá Stevens (20)	Azurá Stevens (9)	Jordin Canada (7)	Galen Center; 3,469	14–18
33	August 25	@ Atlanta	W 83–78	Nneka Ogwumike (29)	Nneka Ogwumike (12)	Jordin Canada (9)	Gateway Center Arena; 2,957	15–18
34	August 27	@ Connecticut	L 68–83	Azurá Stevens (17)	Dearica Hamby (9)	Layshia Clarendon (6)	Mohegan Sun Arena; 6,783	15–19
35	August 29	Chicago	L 75–76	Nneka Ogwumike (18)	Nneka Ogwumike (11)	Jordin Canada (9)	Crypto.com Arena; 6,041	15–20
36	August 31	Seattle	L 61–72	Nneka Ogwumike (11)	Nneka Ogwumike (7)	Jordin Canada (4)	Crypto.com Arena; 6,101	15–21

September : 2–2 (Home: 1–0; Road: 1–2)

Game	Date	Team	Score	High points	High rebounds	High assists	Location Attendance	Record
37	September 3	Washington	W 72–64	Layshia Clarendon (15)	Dearica Hamby (10)	Canada; Clarendon; Hamby; Samuelson (3)	Galen Center; 4,284	16–21
38	September 5	@ Connecticut	L 76–90	Hamby; Stevens (18)	Azurá Stevens (11)	Jordin Canada (8)	Mohegan Sun Arena; 4,783	16–22
39	September 7	@ New York	L 89–96	Layshia Clarendon (30)	Hamby; Stevens (8)	Jordin Canada (5)	Barclays Center; 6,275	16–23
40	September 10	@ Seattle	W 91–89	Nneka Ogwumike (22)	Dearica Hamby (12)	Jordin Canada (7)	Climate Pledge Arena; 10,728	17–23

2023 season schedule

== Standings ==
#	Team	W	L	PCT	GB	Conf.	Home	Road	Cup
1	x – Las Vegas Aces	34	6	.850	–	18–2	19–1	15–5	9–1
2	x – New York Liberty	32	8	.800	2	16–4	15–5	17–3	7–3
3	x – Connecticut Sun	27	13	.675	7	14–6	13–7	14–6	7–3
4	x – Dallas Wings	22	18	.550	12	11–9	11–9	11–9	6–4
5	x – Atlanta Dream	19	21	.475	15	11–9	11–9	8–12	6–4
6	x – Minnesota Lynx	19	21	.475	15	12–8	9–11	10–10	5–5
7	x – Washington Mystics	19	21	.475	15	9–11	12–8	7–13	5–5
8	x – Chicago Sky	18	22	.450	16	5–15	7–13	11–9	3–7
9	e – Los Angeles Sparks	17	23	.425	17	9–11	10–10	7–13	5–5
10	e – Indiana Fever	13	27	.325	21	5–15	6–14	7–13	2–8
11	e – Seattle Storm	11	29	.275	23	8–12	4–16	7–13	4–6
12	e – Phoenix Mercury	9	31	.225	25	2–18	8–12	1–19	1–9

Notes

(#) – League Standing
x – Clinched playoff berth
e – Eliminated from postseason contention
Source: Overall standings and Commissioner's Cup Standings

== Statistics ==
Legend
GP	Games played	GS	Games started	MPG	Minutes per game	RPG	Rebounds per game
APG	Assists per game	SPG	Steals per game	BPG	Blocks per game	PPG	Points per game
FG%	Field-goal percentage	3P%	3-point field-goal percentage	FT%	Free-throw percentage	TO	Turnovers per game
PF	Fouls per game		Team leader		League leader

=== Regular season ===
Player	GP	GS	MPG	FG%	3P%	FT%	RPG	APG	SPG	BPG	PPG
Nneka Ogwumike	36	36	31.1	.512	.339	.870	8.8	2.7	1.7	0.7	19.1
Jordin Canada	38	38	32.6	.404	.333	.873	3.1	6.0	2.3	0.2	13.3
Lexie Brown	12	11	30.3	.486	.415	.875	2.1	2.4	0.9	0.3	12.4
Layshia Clarendon	24	24	28.6	.497	.457	.915	3.0	3.4	1.1	0.0	11.1
Azurá Stevens	35	29	26.0	.404	.321	.754	5.9	1.1	1.2	0.9	10.8
Dearica Hamby	40	19	24.8	.431	.220	.648	5.9	1.8	0.9	0.3	8.9
Chiney Ogwumike	10	4	21.2	.430	.077	.714	4.3	1.3	1.3	0.3	8.4
Karlie Samuelson	34	23	26.1	.463	.426	.941	3.0	2.0	0.6	0.1	7.7
Destanni Henderson^{‡}	10	1	16.9	.362	.105	.737	0.8	2.5	0.7	0.1	5.0
Zia Cooke	39	4	14.1	.289	.261	.813	0.9	0.8	0.3	0.3	4.8
Joyner Holmes^{‡}	5	0	12.0	.348	.286	.750	3.4	0.2	0.0	0.4	4.2
Rae Burrell^{≠}	29	3	11.1	.387	.390	.810	1.2	0.6	0.4	0.1	3.6
Jasmine Thomas	32	7	12.8	.273	.242	.909	1.1	1.3	0.3	0.2	2.7
Nia Clouden	5	1	10.8	.300	.333	.500	0.4	1.8	0.0	0.0	1.6
Evina Westbrook^{≠}	9	0	6.2	.300	.400	1.000	0.9	0.7	0.2	0.2	1.1

^{‡}Waived/Released during the season
^{†}Traded during the season
^{≠}Acquired during the season

== Awards and honors ==
Recipient	Award	Date awarded	Ref.
Nneka Ogwumike	Western Conference Player of the Week	June 6	
Nneka Ogwumike	WNBA All-Star Starter	June 25	
Nneka Ogwumike	All-Defensive Second Team	September 22	
Nneka Ogwumike	All-WNBA Second Team	October 15	
Jordin Canada	All-Defensive First Team	September 22	
