= 2023 Las Vegas Aces season =

27th season of the WNBA

- WNBA champions
- Head coach: Becky Hammon
- Arena: Michelob Ultra Arena

Results
- Record: 34–6 (.850)
- Place: 1st (Western)
- Playoff finish: WNBA Champions (Defeated New York Liberty 3–1 in WNBA Finals)

The 2023 Las Vegas Aces season was the franchise's 27th season in the Women's National Basketball Association and the sixth year the franchise is based in Las Vegas - after relocating from San Antonio and Utah. This was also the second season under head coach Becky Hammon. They were the defending WNBA champions, after defeating the Connecticut Sun in the 2022 WNBA Finals.

The Aces largely kept their team intact after their championship season, only trading away Dearica Hamby, but signing former WNBA Champions Candace Parker and Alysha Clark in the offseason. This continuity proved positive in the first month of the season as the Aces went 4–0 in May. Their winning streak continued and went to seven games before they lost their first game of the season on June 8 to the Connecticut Sun. After the loss, they went on another seven game winning streak, and finished June 10–1. The winning streak continued into July, but ended on the third game of the month with a loss to Dallas. After the nine game winning streak, the Aces again won out in the month, finishing on a seven game winning streak, and finishing July with a 10–1 record. They managed to get their winning streak to eleven before losing to the New York Liberty on August 6. Their next loss would again come at the hands of New York, but this time it was in the Commissioner's Cup Final. The Aces defeated New York in the next regular season game, but would then lose to Los Angeles to end a four game regular season winning streak. The Aces won three of their next five games to finish August with an 8–4 record. During the month, they secured their playoff berth on August 2. They entered the final month of the season fighting with New York for the first seed. The Aces won all three games in September to secure the top seed on the last day of the season.

The Aces finished with a 34–6 regular season record, which was a franchise and WNBA record for number of wins. This was also the first season where the WNBA played 40 games. Their .850 winning percentage was a franchise record but not a WNBA record. The Aces finished as the first seed for the playoffs.

As the first seed, the Aces faced off against the eighth seed Chicago Sky and would host the first two games of the three game series. The Aces didn't lose a quarter in Game One and took the game 87–59. The Aces dominated Game Two in similar fashion, not losing a quarter, and winning the game 92–70 to move on to the Semifinals. In the Semifinals, the Aces faced off against the Dallas Wings. The Aces would host the first two games of the five game series, and game five, if necessary. The Aces dominated Game One, only losing the fourth quarter, but winning the game 97–83. Dallas managed to win two quarters in Game Two, but the Aces won the game 91–84. Game Three, was much closer in Dallas, but the Aces used a strong second half to win the game 64–61 and moved on to the 2023 WNBA Finals.

In the Finals, the Aces faced off against the second seed, New York Liberty. The teams faced each other five times during the regular season, going 2–2 against each other, but the Aces lost the Commissioner's Cup. The Aces used a strong second half to win Game One 99–82. In Game Two, they dominated the first quarter, and again dominated the second half to win 104–76. The Aces only needed to win one of the last three games to retain their title. The Liberty clawed one game back in New York, winning Game Three 87–73. In Game Four, the Aces, as they often had in the playoffs, had a strong second half, and won the game 70–69. The Aces became the first team since the Los Angeles Sparks in 2002 to win back to back WNBA Championships, taking the Finals three games to one.

== Transactions ==
=== WNBA draft ===
Round	Pick	Player	Nationality	School/Team/Country
3	36	Brittney Davis	United States	Alabama

=== Transactions ===
Date	Details
January 21, 2023	Traded Dearica Hamby and a 2024 First-Round Pick to the Los Angeles Sparks in exchange for the negotiating rights to Amanda Zahui B and a 2024 Second-Round Pick
February 1, 2023	Signed Candace Parker to a 1-Year Deal
February 1, 2023	Signed Alysha Clark to a 2-Year Deal
February 1, 2023	Signed Cayla George to a 1-Year Deal
February 1, 2023	Signed Alexis Peterson and Courtney Range to Training Camp Contracts
February 5, 2023	Traded the negotiating rights to Amanda Zahui B to the Washington Mystics for 2024 and 2025 Second-Round Picks
February 6, 2023	Waived Iliana Rupert
February 6, 2023	Signed Sydney Colson to a Training Camp Contract
February 7. 2023	Signed Kiah Stokes to a 1-Year Deal
April 12, 2023	Signed Elizabeth Balogun to a Training Camp Contract
April 14, 2023	Signed Brittany Davis to a Rookie Scale Contract
April 24, 2023	Waived Elizabeth Balogun
May 9, 2023	Waived Aisha Sheppard, Courtney Range, and Brittany Davis
May 15, 2023	Waived Alexis Peterson
June 30, 2023	Signed A'ja Wilson to a Contract Extension
July 19, 2023	Signed Ashley Joens to a 7-Day Contract
July 26, 2023	Signed Ashley Joens to a 2nd 7-Day Contract
August 6, 2023	Signed Alaina Coates to a 7-Day Contract
August 10, 2023	Signed Alaina Coates to a 2nd 7-Day Contract
August 16, 2023	Signed Alaina Coates to a 3rd 7-Day Contract
August 23, 2023	Signed Alaina Coates to a Hardship Contract

=== Roster Changes ===
==== Additions ====
Personnel	Signed/Trade	Former team
Amanda Zahui B	Trade - January 21	Los Angeles Sparks
Candace Parker	February 1	Chicago Sky
Alysha Clark	February 1	Washington Mystics
Cayla George	February 1	Melbourne Boomers
Alaina Coates	August 2	Phoenix Mercury

==== Subtractions ====
Personnel	Reason	New team
Dearica Hamby	Trade	Los Angeles Sparks
Amanda Zahui B	Trade	Washington Mystics
Iliana Rupert	Waived	Atlanta Dream
Aisha Sheppard	Waived	-

== Roster ==
2023 Las Vegas Aces roster
Players
Coaches

Pos.	No.	Nat.	Name	Height	Weight	DOB	From	Yrs
F	1	(United States)	Bell, Kierstan	6' 1" (1.85m)	176 lb (80kg)	2000-03-16	Florida Gulf Coast	1
F	7	(Israel)	Clark, Alysha	5' 11" (1.8m)	167 lb (76kg)	1987-07-07	Middle Tennessee	10
C	81	(United States)	Coates, Alaina	6' 4" (1.93m)	225 lb (102kg)	1995-04-07	South Carolina	4
G	51	(United States)	Colson, Sydney	5' 8" (1.73m)	140 lb (64kg)	1989-08-06	Texas A&M	8
F/C	13	(Australia)	George, Cayla	6' 4" (1.93m)	192 lb (87kg)	1989-05-01	Australia	3
G	12	(United States)	Gray, Chelsea	5' 11" (1.8m)	170 lb (77kg)	1992-10-08	Duke	8
F/C	3	(United States)	Parker, Candace (injured)	6' 4" (1.93m)	184 lb (83kg)	1986-04-19	Tennessee	15
G	10	(United States)	Plum, Kelsey	5' 8" (1.73m)	145 lb (66kg)	1994-08-24	Washington	5
C	41	(Turkey)	Stokes, Kiah	6' 3" (1.91m)	191 lb (87kg)	1993-03-30	Connecticut	7
G	2	(United States)	Williams, Riquna	5' 6" (1.68m)	165 lb (75kg)	1990-05-28	Miami (FL)	10
F	22	(United States)	Wilson, A'ja	6' 4" (1.93m)	195 lb (88kg)	1996-08-08	South Carolina	5
G	0	(United States)	Young, Jackie	6' 0" (1.83m)	165 lb (75kg)	1997-09-16	Notre Dame	4

Head coach
(United States) Becky Hammon (Colorado State)
Assistant coaches
(United States) Natalie Nakase (UCLA)
(United States) Tyler Marsh (Birmingham–Southern)
(United States) Charlene Thomas-Swinson (Auburn)
Athletic trainer
(United States) Michelle Anumba (Duke)

Legend

- (C) Team captain
- (DP) Unsigned draft pick
- (FA) Free agent
- (S) Suspended
- Injured

=== Depth chart ===
Pos.	Starter	Bench
PG	Chelsea Gray	Sydney Colson
SG	Kelsey Plum	Riquna Williams
SF	Jackie Young	Alysha Clark; Kierstan Bell
PF	Candace Parker	Cayla George
C	A'ja Wilson	Kiah Stokes

== Schedule ==
=== Preseason ===
2023 pre-season game log
Total: 1–0 (Home: 1–0; Road: 0–0)
May: 1–0 (Home: 1–0; Road: 0–0)

Game	Date	Team	Score	High points	High rebounds	High assists	Location Attendance	Record
1	May 13	New York	W 84–77	Kelsey Plum (22)	Chelsea Gray (8)	Peterson; Plum (3)	Michelob Ultra Arena; 4,460	1–0

2023 pre-season schedule

=== Regular season ===
2023 game log
Total: 34–6 (Home: 19–1; Road: 15–5)
May: 4–0 (Home: 2–0; Road: 2–0)

Game	Date	Team	Score	High points	High rebounds	High assists	Location Attendance	Record
1	May 20	@ Seattle	W 105–64	Plum; Young (23)	A'ja Wilson (13)	Chelsea Gray (6)	Climate Pledge Arena; 11,229	1–0
2	May 25	@ Los Angeles	W 94–85	Jackie Young (30)	A'ja Wilson (13)	Chelsea Gray (8)	Crypto.com Arena; 7,314	2–0
3	May 27	Los Angeles	W 93–65	A'ja Wilson (23)	Kiah Stokes (9)	Chelsea Gray (7)	Michelob Ultra Arena; 10,191	3–0
4	May 28	Minnesota	W 94–73	Jackie Young (23)	Candace Parker (8)	Chelsea Gray (10)	Michelob Ultra Arena; 7,970	4–0

June : 10–1 (Home: 6–0; Road: 4–1)

Game	Date	Team	Score	High points	High rebounds	High assists	Location Attendance	Record
5	June 2	@ Atlanta	W 92–87	A'ja Wilson (21)	Kiah Stokes (7)	Chelsea Gray (4)	Gateway Center Arena; 3,209	5–0
6	June 4	@ Indiana	W 84–80	A'ja Wilson (27)	A'ja Wilson (10)	Chelsea Gray (7)	Gainbridge Fieldhouse; 6,131	6–0
7	June 6	@ Connecticut	W 90–84	A'ja Wilson (23)	A'ja Wilson (10)	Chelsea Gray (7)	Mohegan Sun Arena; 4,368	7–0
8	June 8	@ Connecticut	L 77–94	Kelsey Plum (16)	Bell; Stokes (5)	A'ja Wilson (4)	Mohegan Sun Arena; 5,147	7–1
9	June 11	Chicago	W 93–80	A'ja Wilson (21)	A'ja Wilson (10)	Candace Parker (7)	Michelob Ultra Arena; 9,786	8–1
10	June 15	Seattle	W 96–63	Jackie Young (28)	A'ja Wilson (12)	Chelsea Gray (9)	Michelob Ultra Arena; 8,518	9–1
11	June 18	Minnesota	W 93–62	Jackie Young (24)	A'ja Wilson (14)	Gray; Parker (5)	Michelob Ultra Arena; 8,036	10–1
12	June 21	@ Phoenix	W 99–79	Jackie Young (23)	A'ja Wilson (12)	Chelsea Gray (8)	Footprint Center; 11,580	11–1
13	June 24	Indiana	W 101–88	A'ja Wilson (28)	A'ja Wilson (10)	Chelsea Gray (12)	Michelob Ultra Arena; 8,310	12–1
14	June 26	Indiana	W 88–80	Chelsea Gray (25)	Candace Parker (12)	Chelsea Gray (5)	Michelob Ultra Arena; 8,143	13–1
15	June 29	New York	W 98–81	Kelsey Plum (18)	Candace Parker (6)	Kelsey Plum (8)	Michelob Ultra Arena; 9,587	14–1

July : 10–1 (Home: 4–0; Road: 6–1)

Game	Date	Team	Score	High points	High rebounds	High assists	Location Attendance	Record
16	July 1	Connecticut	W 102–84	Kelsey Plum (25)	A'ja Wilson (13)	Candace Parker (8)	Michelob Ultra Arena; 8,596	15–1
17	July 5	Dallas	W 89–82	Jackie Young (28)	A'ja Wilson (13)	Chelsea Gray (6)	Michelob Ultra Arena; 10,177	16–1
18	July 7	@ Dallas	L 78–80	Kelsey Plum (21)	Parker; Stokes (6)	Kelsey Plum (6)	College Park Center; 6,251	16–2
19	July 9	@ Minnesota	W 113–89	Kelsey Plum (40)	A'ja Wilson (10)	Chelsea Gray (10)	Target Center; 7,701	17–2
20	July 11	Phoenix	W 98–72	Jackie Young (23)	A'ja Wilson (8)	Chelsea Gray (11)	Michelob Ultra Arena; 10,281	18–2
21	July 12	@ Los Angeles	W 97–78	A'ja Wilson (25)	A'ja Wilson (12)	Gray; Young (5)	Crypto.com Arena; 8,085	19–2
22	July 20	@ Seattle	W 79–63	A'ja Wilson (23)	A'ja Wilson (15)	Chelsea Gray (8)	Climate Pledge Arena; 7,873	20–2
23	July 22	@ Minnesota	W 98–81	A'ja Wilson (35)	A'ja Wilson (14)	Chelsea Gray (11)	Target Center; 7,801	21–2
24	July 25	@ Chicago	W 107–95	Kelsey Plum (27)	Kiah Stokes (17)	Chelsea Gray (9)	Wintrust Arena; 9,025	22–2
25	July 30	Dallas	W 104–91	Kelsey Plum (28)	A'ja Wilson (7)	Chelsea Gray (8)	Michelob Ultra Arena; 10,213	23–2

August : 8–4 (Home: 5–1; Road: 3–3)

Game	Date	Team	Score	High points	High rebounds	High assists	Location Attendance	Record
26	August 1	Atlanta	W 93–72	Jackie Young (24)	A'ja Wilson (11)	Chelsea Gray (7)	Michelob Ultra Arena; 8,366	24–2
27	August 6	@ New York	L 61–99	Jackie Young (16)	A'ja Wilson (7)	Chelsea Gray (6)	Barclays Center; 11,418	24–3
28	August 8	@ Dallas	W 104–84	A'ja Wilson (28)	A'ja Wilson (14)	Kelsey Plum (8)	College Park Center; 5,193	25–3
29	August 11	Washington	W 113–89	A'ja Wilson (40)	A'ja Wilson (12)	Gray; Plum (10)	Michelob Ultra Arena; 9,364	26–3
30	August 13	Atlanta	W 86–65	A'ja Wilson (21)	Kiah Stokes (12)	Chelsea Gray (6)	Michelob Ultra Arena; 8,564	27–3
Commissioner's Cup Final	August 15	New York	L 63–82	Jackie Young (16)	Gray; Stokes (6)	Kelsey Plum (6)	Michelob Ultra Arena; 8,967	—
31	August 17	New York	W 88–75	Chelsea Gray (22)	Chelsea Gray (11)	Chelsea Gray (11)	Michelob Ultra Arena; 9,230	28–3
32	August 19	Los Angeles	L 72–78	A'ja Wilson (25)	A'ja Wilson (9)	Chelsea Gray (7)	Michelob Ultra Arena; 10,348	28–4
33	August 22	@ Atlanta	W 112–100	A'ja Wilson (53)	Chelsea Gray (9)	Chelsea Gray (12)	Gateway Center Arena; 3,209	29–4
34	August 24	@ Chicago	W 94–87	Jackie Young (24)	Wilson; Young (10)	Chelsea Gray (10)	Wintrust Arena; 8,084	30–4
35	August 26	@ Washington	L 62–78	Kelsey Plum (21)	A'ja Wilson (11)	Chelsea Gray (4)	Entertainment and Sports Arena; 4,200	30–5
36	August 28	@ New York	L 85–94	Jackie Young (24)	A'ja Wilson (8)	Chelsea Gray (9)	Barclays Center; 11,615	30–6
37	August 31	Washington	W 84–75	A'ja Wilson (26)	A'ja Wilson (11)	Kelsey Plum (10)	Michelob Ultra Arena; 8,619	31–6

September : 3–0 (Home: 2–0; Road: 1–0)

Game	Date	Team	Score	High points	High rebounds	High assists	Location Attendance	Record
38	September 2	Seattle	W 103–77	A'ja Wilson (30)	Kiah Stokes (11)	Chelsea Gray (9)	Michelob Ultra Arena; 9,319	32–6
39	September 8	@ Phoenix	W 94–73	A'ja Wilson (30)	A'ja Wilson (9)	Chelsea Gray (12)	Footprint Center; 13,206	33–6
40	September 10	Phoenix	W 100–85	A'ja Wilson (36)	A'ja Wilson (8)	Chelsea Gray (8)	T-Mobile Arena; 17,406	34–6

2023 season schedule

=== Playoffs ===
2023 playoff game log
First Round vs. Chicago
Won Series: 2–0

Game	Date	Team	Score	High points	High rebounds	High assists	Location Attendance	Series
1	September 13	Chicago	W 87–59	Chelsea Gray (20)	Kiah Stokes (15)	Chelsea Gray (7)	T-Mobile Arena; 12,927	1–0
2	September 17	Chicago	W 92–70	A'ja Wilson (38)	A'ja Wilson (16)	Chelsea Gray (9)	Michelob Ultra Arena; 9,000	2–0

Semifinals vs. Dallas
Won Series: 3–0

Game	Date	Team	Score	High points	High rebounds	High assists	Location Attendance	Series
1	September 24	Dallas	W 97–83	A'ja Wilson (34)	Jackie Young (10)	Jackie Young (7)	Michelob Ultra Arena; 9,784	1–0
2	September 26	Dallas	W 91–84	A'ja Wilson (30)	A'ja Wilson (11)	Chelsea Gray (8)	Michelob Ultra Arena; 9,286	2–0
3	September 29	@ Dallas	W 64–61	Chelsea Gray (15)	A'ja Wilson (13)	Kelsey Plum (7)	College Park Center; 6,251	3–0

Finals vs. New York Liberty
Won Series: 3–1

Game	Date	Team	Score	High points	High rebounds	High assists	Location Attendance	Series
1	October 8	New York	W 99–82	Plum; Young (26)	A'ja Wilson (8)	Chelsea Gray (9)	Michelob Ultra Arena; 10,300	1–0
2	October 11	New York	W 104–76	A'ja Wilson (26)	A'ja Wilson (15)	Chelsea Gray (11)	Michelob Ultra Arena; 10,232	2–0
3	October 15	@ New York	L 73–87	Kelsey Plum (29)	A'ja Wilson (11)	Jackie Young (5)	Barclays Center; 17,143	2–1
4	October 18	@ New York	W 70–69	A'ja Wilson (24)	A'ja Wilson (16)	Jackie Young (7)	Barclays Center; 16,851	3–1

2023 playoff schedule

== Standings ==
#	Team	W	L	PCT	GB	Conf.	Home	Road	Cup
1	x – Las Vegas Aces	34	6	.850	–	18–2	19–1	15–5	9–1
2	x – New York Liberty	32	8	.800	2	16–4	15–5	17–3	7–3
3	x – Connecticut Sun	27	13	.675	7	14–6	13–7	14–6	7–3
4	x – Dallas Wings	22	18	.550	12	11–9	11–9	11–9	6–4
5	x – Atlanta Dream	19	21	.475	15	11–9	11–9	8–12	6–4
6	x – Minnesota Lynx	19	21	.475	15	12–8	9–11	10–10	5–5
7	x – Washington Mystics	19	21	.475	15	9–11	12–8	7–13	5–5
8	x – Chicago Sky	18	22	.450	16	5–15	7–13	11–9	3–7
9	e – Los Angeles Sparks	17	23	.425	17	9–11	10–10	7–13	5–5
10	e – Indiana Fever	13	27	.325	21	5–15	6–14	7–13	2–8
11	e – Seattle Storm	11	29	.275	23	8–12	4–16	7–13	4–6
12	e – Phoenix Mercury	9	31	.225	25	2–18	8–12	1–19	1–9

Notes

(#) – League Standing
x – Clinched playoff berth
e – Eliminated from postseason contention
Source: Overall standings and Commissioner's Cup Standings

== Playoffs ==
**First round** Best-of-3
**1**	**Las Vegas Aces**	**2**
8	Chicago Sky	0
**4**	**Dallas Wings**	**2**
5	Atlanta Dream	0
**2**	**New York Liberty**	**2**
7	Washington Mystics	0
**3**	**Connecticut Sun**	**2**
6	Minnesota Lynx	1

**Semifinals**; Best-of-5
**1**	**Las Vegas Aces**	**3**
4	Dallas Wings	0
**2**	**New York Liberty**	**3**
3	Connecticut Sun	1

**Finals**; Best-of-5
1	**Las Vegas Aces**	**3**
2	New York Liberty	1

- **Bold** – Series winner
- Italic – Team with home-court advantage

== Statistics ==
Legend
GP	Games played	GS	Games started	MPG	Minutes per game	RPG	Rebounds per game
APG	Assists per game	SPG	Steals per game	BPG	Blocks per game	PPG	Points per game
FG%	Field-goal percentage	3P%	3-point field-goal percentage	FT%	Free-throw percentage	TO	Turnovers per game
PF	Fouls per game		Team leader		League leader

=== Regular season ===
Player	GP	GS	MPG	FG%	3P%	FT%	RPG	APG	SPG	BPG	PPG
A'ja Wilson	40	40	30.7	.557	.310	.812	9.5	1.6	1.4	2.2	22.8
Kelsey Plum	39	39	32.4	.475	.389	.912	2.4	4.5	1.1	0.0	18.7
Jackie Young	40	40	31.5	.523	.449	.867	4.0	3.8	1.3	0.1	17.6
Chelsea Gray	40	40	32.2	.490	.421	.897	4.0	7.3	1.4	0.6	15.3
Candace Parker	18	18	23.6	.465	.333	.893	5.4	3.7	1.5	0.9	9.0
Alysha Clark	39	1	22.5	.444	.386	.818	3.4	1.1	0.6	0.2	6.7
Kierstan Bell	36	0	11.8	.346	.244	.600	1.6	0.5	0.4	0.1	3.7
Cayla George	32	0	8.5	.288	.234	.000	1.8	0.4	0.3	0.2	2.3
Kiah Stokes	40	22	19.8	.434	.185	.500	5.9	0.6	0.7	1.0	2.2
Sydney Colson	28	0	4.8	.444	.375	.833	0.4	0.8	0.3	0.0	1.3
Alaina Coates^{≠}	10	0	3.0	.800	.000	.250	1.0	0.0	0.2	0.0	0.9
Ashley Joens^{‡}	2	0	3.0	.000	.000	.000	0.0	0.0	0.0	0.0	0.0

^{‡}Waived/Released during the season
^{†}Traded during the season
^{≠}Acquired during the season

=== Playoffs ===
Player	GP	GS	MPG	FG%	3P%	FT%	RPG	APG	SPG	BPG	PPG
A'ja Wilson	9	9	33.2	.554	.500	.831	11.8	1.2	1.4	2.3	23.8
Kelsey Plum	9	9	36.8	.417	.403	.875	3.2	3.8	1.3	0.0	18.3
Jackie Young	9	9	34.8	.421	.415	.914	5.6	5.0	1.6	0.1	16.7
Chelsea Gray	8	8	35.9	.436	.355	1.00	4.8	6.8	1.5	1.0	15.6
Alysha Clark	9	1	24.1	.529	.318	.929	4.4	1.3	0.3	0.1	8.2
Kiah Stokes	8	8	26.1	.563	.500	1.00	7.9	1.3	1.0	0.3	2.8
Cayla George	8	1	6.0	.200	.250	1.00	0.6	0.5	0.4	0.0	1.6
Kierstan Bell	8	0	6.3	.167	.000	1.00	0.8	0.3	0.4	0.3	1.3
Sydney Colson	7	0	4.9	.250	.000	.000	0.4	0.3	0.1	0.0	0.3
Alaina Coates	6	0	1.8	1.00	.000	.000	0.8	0.0	0.2	0.0	0.3

== Awards and honors ==
Recipient	Award	Date awarded	Ref.
A'ja Wilson	WNBA All-Star Starter & Captain	June 25	
A'ja Wilson	Western Conference Player of the Week	June 27	
A'ja Wilson	Western Conference Player of the Week	July 25	
A'ja Wilson	Western Conference Player of the Week	August 15	
A'ja Wilson	Western Conference Player of the Week	August 29	
A'ja Wilson	Player of the Month - June	July 5	
A'ja Wilson	Player of the Month - July	August 2	
A'ja Wilson	Player of the Month - August	September 6	
A'ja Wilson	Defensive Player of the Year	September 22	
A'ja Wilson	All-Defensive First Team	September 22	
A'ja Wilson	All-WNBA First Team	October 15	
A'ja Wilson	WNBA Finals MVP	October 18	
Jackie Young	WNBA All-Star Starter	June 25	
Jackie Young	All-WNBA Second Team	October 15	
Chelsea Gray	WNBA All-Star Starter	June 25	
Chelsea Gray	Western Conference Player of the Week	August 2	
Chelsea Gray	All-WNBA Second Team	October 15	
Kelsey Plum	WNBA All-Star	July 1	
Becky Hammon	Coach of the Month - June	July 5	
Alysha Clark	Sixth Player of the Year	September 18	
