= 2023 Seattle Storm season =

- Head coach: Noelle Quinn
- Arena: Climate Pledge Arena

Results
- Record: 11–29 (.275)
- Place: 5th (Western)
- Playoff finish: Did not qualify

The 2023 Seattle Storm season was the franchise's 24th season in the Women's National Basketball Association, and the second full season under head coach Noelle Quinn. Quinn took over in May of the 2021 season.

Seattle started the season slowly, losing all three of their games in May and their first game in June. They would go on to win three more games in June, but would lose seven more to finish the month with a 4–8 record. The team lost their first eight games in July, and combined with two losses to end June, the Storm were on a ten game losing streak. However, they ended the streak with two wins to end July with a 2–8 record. Their reversal of fortunes continued into August as they won three of their first five games in the month. However, they could not continue the momentum and finished the month losing four of six games. They finished August with a 5–6 overall record. The Storm finished the season on a four game losing streak, losing all four of their games in September. Their seven-year playoff streak was ended on August 27 with a loss to the Chicago Sky. A disappointing season was perhaps expected after the off-season departures of Breanna Stewart and Sue Bird. The team's eleven wins was their lowest total since 2015 and their .275 winning percentage was their lowest since their inaugural season in 2000. Their 29 losses this season was the lowest in franchise history, but it was also the first season of the WNBA's 40 game schedule.

== Transactions ==
=== WNBA draft ===
| Round | Pick | Player | Nationality | School/Team/Country |
|---|---|---|---|---|
| 1 | 9 | Jordan Horston | United States | Tennessee |
| 2 | 18 | Madi Williams | United States | Oklahoma |
| 2 | 21 | Dulcy Fankam Mendjiadeu | Cameroon | South Florida |
| 3 | 33 | Jade Loville | United States | Arizona |

=== Transactions ===
| Date | Transaction |
|---|---|
| January 12, 2023 | Extended Qualifying Offers to Gabby Williams and Ezi Magbegor |
| February 3, 2023 | Signed Kia Nurse to a 2-Year Deal |
| February 3, 2023 | Signed Sami Whitcomb |
| February 4, 2023 | Signed Ezi Magbegor to a 2-Year Deal |
| February 6, 2023 | Signed Arella Guirantes, Kaila Charles, and Yvonne Turner to Training Camp Contracts |
| February 8, 2023 | Signed Theresa Plaisance to a 1-Year Deal |
| February 20, 2023 | Signed Jade Melbourne to a Rookie Scale Contract |
| February 22, 2023 | Signed Ivana Dojkić |
| February 24, 2023 | Signed Jasmine Walker |
| April 14, 2023 | Signed Jordan Horston, Dulcy Fankam Mendjiadeu, and Jade Loville to Rookie Scale Contracts |
| April 17, 2023 | Signed Madi Williams to a Rookie Scale Contract |
| May 9, 2023 | Waived Jade Loville |
| May 12, 2023 | Waived Madi Williams |
| May 16, 2023 | Waived Jasmine Walker |
| May 18, 2023 | Waived Theresa Plaisance |
| June 9, 2023 | Waived Kaila Charles |
| June 9, 2023 | Signed Joyner Holmes |
| June 29, 2023 | Waived Arella Guirantes |
| July 3, 2023 | Signed Gabby Williams |
| August 10, 2023 | Waived Ivana Dojkić |
| September 9, 2023 | Signed Jewell Loyd to a Contract Extension |
| September 25, 2023 | Signed Head Coach Noelle Quinn to an Extension |
| September 25, 2023 | Assistant Coach Pokey Chatman elevated to Assistant General Manager |

=== Roster Changes ===
==== Additions ====
| Personnel | Signed | Former team |
|---|---|---|
| Kia Nurse | Free Agency | Phoenix Mercury |
| Sami Whitcomb | Free Agency | New York Liberty |
| Jordan Horston | Draft Pick | 2023 Draft Pick |
| Jade Melbourne | Draft Pick | 2022 Draft Pick |
| Yvonne Turner | Free Agency | Phoenix Mercury |
| Joyner Holmes | Free Agency | Los Angeles Sparks |

==== Subtractions ====
| Personnel | Reason | New team |
|---|---|---|
| Sue Bird | Retired | |
| Briann January | Retired | Connecticut Sun - Assistant Coach |
| Breanna Stewart | Free Agency | New York Liberty |
| Epiphanny Prince | Free Agency | New York Liberty |
| Tina Charles | Free Agency | - |
| Stephanie Talbot | Free Agency | Los Angeles Sparks |
| Jantel Lavender | Free Agency | - |

== Roster ==
2023 Seattle Storm roster
Players
Coaches

| Pos. | No. | Nat. | Name | Height | Weight | DOB | From | Yrs |
|---|---|---|---|---|---|---|---|---|
| C | 12 | (Cameroon) | Fankam Mendjiadeu, Dulcy | 6' 4" (1.93m) | 202 lb (92kg) | 1999-07-26 | South Florida | R |
| F | 8 | (United States) | Holmes, Joyner | 6' 3" (1.91m) | 210 lb (95kg) | 1998-02-22 | Texas | 3 |
| G/F | 23 | (United States) | Horston, Jordan | 6' 2" (1.88m) | 170 lb (77kg) | 2001-05-21 | Tennessee | R |
| G | 24 | (United States) | Loyd, Jewell | 5' 10" (1.78m) | 148 lb (67kg) | 1993-10-05 | Notre Dame | 8 |
| C | 13 | (Australia) | Magbegor, Ezi | 6' 4" (1.93m) | 176 lb (80kg) | 1999-08-13 | Australia | 3 |
| G | 6 | (Australia) | Melbourne, Jade | 5' 10" (1.78m) | 145 lb (66kg) | 2002-08-18 | Australia | R |
| G | 0 | (Canada) | Nurse, Kia | 6' 0" (1.83m) | 168 lb (76kg) | 1996-02-22 | Connecticut | 4 |
| C | 21 | (United States) | Russell, Mercedes | 6' 6" (1.98m) | 195 lb (88kg) | 1995-07-27 | Tennessee | 5 |
| G | 22 | (United States) | Turner, Yvonne | 5' 10" (1.78m) | 131 lb (59kg) | 1987-10-13 | Nebraska | 4 |
| G | 32 | (Australia) | Whitcomb, Sami | 5' 10" (1.78m) | 145 lb (66kg) | 1988-07-20 | Washington | 6 |
| F | 5 | (France) | Williams, Gabby | 5' 11" (1.8m) | 172 lb (78kg) | 1996-09-09 | Connecticut | 4 |

Head coach
(Bulgaria) Noelle Quinn (UCLA)
Assistant coaches
(United States) Pokey Chatman (LSU)
(United States) Ebony Hoffman (USC)
(United States) Perry Huang (Fresno Pacific)
Athletic trainer
Brittanie Vaughn

Legend

- (C) Team captain
- (DP) Unsigned draft pick
- (FA) Free agent
- (S) Suspended
- Injured

=== Depth ===
| Pos. | Starter | Bench |
|---|---|---|
| PG | Sami Whitcomb | Jade Melbourne; Yvonne Turner |
| SG | Jewell Loyd | Kia Nurse |
| SF | Jordan Horston | Gabby Williams |
| PF | Dulcy Fankam Mendjiadeu | Joyner Holmes |
| C | Ezi Magbegor | Mercedes Russell |

== Schedule ==
=== Preseason ===
2023 pre-season game log
Total: 0–1 (Home: 0–1; Road: 0–0)
May: 0–1 (Home: 0–1; Road: 0–0)

| Game | Date | Team | Score | High points | High rebounds | High assists | Location Attendance | Record |
|---|---|---|---|---|---|---|---|---|
| 1 | May 8 | Phoenix | 71–77 | Dulcy Fankam Mendjiadeu (10) | Dulcy Fankam Mendjiadeu (9) | Jade Melbourne (3) | Climate Pledge Arena; 5,119 | 0–1 |

2023 pre-season schedule

=== Regular season ===
2023 game log
Total: 11–29 (Home: 4–16; Road: 7–13)
May: 0–3 (Home: 0–3; Road: 0–0)

| Game | Date | Team | Score | High points | High rebounds | High assists | Location Attendance | Record |
|---|---|---|---|---|---|---|---|---|
| 1 | May 20 | Las Vegas | L 64–105 | Jewell Loyd (22) | Mercedes Russell (9) | Jewell Loyd (4) | Climate Pledge Arena; 11,229 | 0–1 |
| 2 | May 26 | Dallas | L 91–95 | Jewell Loyd (30) | Ezi Magbegor (12) | Loyd; Whitcomb (3) | Climate Pledge Arena; 8,277 | 0–2 |
| 3 | May 30 | New York | W 86–78 | Jewell Loyd (26) | Ezi Magbegor (14) | Mercedes Russell (4) | Climate Pledge Arena; 8,340 | 0–3 |

June : 4–8 (Home: 2–5; Road: 2–3)

| Game | Date | Team | Score | High points | High rebounds | High assists | Location Attendance | Record |
|---|---|---|---|---|---|---|---|---|
| 4 | June 3 | @ Los Angeles | L 85–92 | Jewell Loyd (37) | Ezi Magbegor (8) | Jewell Loyd (6) | Crypto.com Arena; 6,866 | 0–4 |
| 5 | June 6 | Los Angeles | W 66–63 | Jewell Loyd (25) | Ezi Magbegor (10) | Loyd; Magbegor (3) | Climate Pledge Arena; 7,840 | 1–4 |
| 6 | June 9 | Washington | L 66–73 | Ezi Magbegor (24) | Jordan Horston (9) | Jade Melbourne (5) | Climate Pledge Arena; 8,397 | 1–5 |
| 7 | June 11 | Washington | L 71–65 | Jewell Loyd (16) | Ezi Magbegor (7) | Jewell Loyd (5) | Climate Pledge Arena; 13,213 | 1–6 |
| 8 | June 13 | @ Phoenix | W 83–69 | Sami Whitcomb (18) | Jordan Horston (14) | Dojkić; Loyd (4) | Footprint Center; 7,044 | 2–6 |
| 9 | June 15 | @ Las Vegas | L 63–96 | Ezi Magbegor (23) | Ezi Magbegor (11) | Ivana Dojkić (3) | Michelob Ultra Arena; 8,518 | 2–7 |
| 10 | June 17 | @ Dallas | W 109–103 | Jewell Loyd (39) | Mercedes Russell (10) | Ivana Dojkić (7) | College Park Center; 5,020 | 3–7 |
| 11 | June 20 | Connecticut | L 79–85 | Jewell Loyd (33) | Jordan Horston (13) | Kia Nurse (5) | Climate Pledge Arena; 7,022 | 3–8 |
| 12 | June 22 | Indiana | L 68–80 | Jewell Loyd (19) | Mercedes Russell (8) | Ivana Dojkić (6) | Climate Pledge Arena; 7,734 | 3–9 |
| 13 | June 24 | Phoenix | W 97–74 | Jewell Loyd (24) | Jewell Loyd (7) | Kia Nurse (4) | Climate Pledge Arena; 9,122 | 4–9 |
| 14 | June 27 | @ Minnesota | L 93–104 | Magbegor; Whitcomb (20) | Jewell Loyd (9) | Ivana Dojkić (9) | Target Center; 7,014 | 4–10 |
| 15 | June 29 | Minnesota | L 97–99 (OT) | Jewell Loyd (41) | Ezi Magbegor (16) | Ivana Dojkić (10) | Climate Pledge Arena; 6,894 | 4–11 |

July : 2–8 (Home: 0–2; Road: 2–6)

| Game | Date | Team | Score | High points | High rebounds | High assists | Location Attendance | Record |
|---|---|---|---|---|---|---|---|---|
| 16 | July 2 | New York | L 66–81 | Jewell Loyd (27) | Ezi Magbegor (9) | Ezi Magbegor (4) | Climate Pledge Arena; 9,110 | 4–12 |
| 17 | July 6 | @ Connecticut | L 73–93 | Jewell Loyd (22) | Sami Whitcomb (9) | Nurse; Whitcomb (4) | Mohegan Sun Arena; 5,479 | 4–13 |
| 18 | July 8 | @ New York | L 76–80 | Sami Whitcomb (19) | Dulcy Fankam Mendjiadeu (14) | Ezi Magbegor (6) | Barclays Center; 6,789 | 4–14 |
| 19 | July 11 | @ Washington | L 86–93 | Jewell Loyd (39) | Dulcy Fankam Mendjiadeu (11) | Loyd; Melbourne; Nurse (3) | Entertainment and Sports Arena; 3,571 | 4–15 |
| 20 | July 12 | @ Atlanta | L 75–85 | Jordan Horston (23) | Jordan Horston (10) | Jade Melbourne (5) | Gateway Center Arena; 2,546 | 4–16 |
| 21 | July 20 | Las Vegas | L 63–79 | Loyd; Magbegor (12) | Ezi Magbegor (7) | Jewell Loyd (6) | Climate Pledge Arena; 7,873 | 4–17 |
| 22 | July 22 | Chicago | L 75–90 | Ezi Magbegor (14) | Holmes; Loyd (4) | Jewell Loyd (3) | Climate Pledge Arena; 8,655 | 4–18 |
| 23 | July 25 | @ New York | L 82–86 | Jewell Loyd (32) | Ezi Magbegor (12) | Sami Whitcomb (6) | Barclays Center; 6,118 | 4–19 |
| 24 | July 28 | @ Chicago | W 83–74 | Magbegor; Williams (17) | Sami Whitcomb (10) | Jewell Loyd (6) | Wintrust Arena; 7,213 | 5–19 |
| 25 | July 30 | @ Indiana | W 85–62 | Jewell Loyd (26) | Jordan Horston (6) | Jewell Loyd (8) | Gainbridge Fieldhouse; 5,196 | 6–19 |

August : 5–6 (Home: 2–3; Road: 3–3)

| Game | Date | Team | Score | High points | High rebounds | High assists | Location Attendance | Record |
|---|---|---|---|---|---|---|---|---|
| 26 | August 2 | Dallas | L 65–76 | Jewell Loyd (31) | Ezi Magbegor (9) | Gabby Williams (5) | Climate Pledge Arena; 7,421 | 6–20 |
| 27 | August 5 | @ Phoenix | W 97–91 | Jewell Loyd (32) | Mercedes Russell (8) | Gabby Williams (6) | Footprint Center; 9,411 | 7–20 |
| 28 | August 8 | Connecticut | L 69–81 | Loyd; Whitcomb (11) | Dulcy Fankam Mendjiadeu (12) | Sami Whitcomb (5) | Climate Pledge Arena; 10,212 | 7–21 |
| 29 | August 10 | Atlanta | W 68–67 | Jewell Loyd (19) | Ezi Magbegor (11) | Sami Whitcomb (5) | Climate Pledge Arena; 7,649 | 8–21 |
| 30 | August 13 | Phoenix | W 81–71 | Jewell Loyd (24) | Mercedes Russell (10) | Sami Whitcomb (8) | Climate Pledge Arena; 10,107 | 9–21 |
| 31 | August 18 | Minnesota | L 70–78 | Sami Whitcomb (23) | Ezi Magbegor (7) | Sami Whitcomb (3) | Climate Pledge Arena; 8,865 | 9–22 |
| 32 | August 20 | @ Minnesota | W 88–74 | Jewell Loyd (31) | Dulcy Fankam Mendjiadeu (15) | Loyd; Magbegor (4) | Target Center; 6,525 | 10–22 |
| 33 | August 22 | @ Chicago | L 79–102 | Jewell Loyd (26) | Jordan Horston (11) | Loyd; Magbegor (5) | Wintrust Arena; 4,822 | 10–23 |
| 34 | August 24 | @ Indiana | L 86–90 | Jewell Loyd (32) | Ezi Magbegor (13) | Sami Whitcomb (4) | Gainbridge Fieldhouse; 2,644 | 10–24 |
| 35 | August 27 | Chicago | L 85–90 | Loyd; Whitcomb (19) | Ezi Magbegor (14) | Jewell Loyd (6) | Climate Pledge Arena; 9,893 | 10–25 |
| 36 | August 31 | @ Los Angeles | W 72–61 | Jewell Loyd (25) | Horston; Magbegor (8) | Jewell Loyd (7) | Crypto.com Arena; 6,101 | 11–25 |

September : 0–3 (Home: 0–0; Road: 0–3)

| Game | Date | Team | Score | High points | High rebounds | High assists | Location Attendance | Record |
|---|---|---|---|---|---|---|---|---|
| 37 | September 2 | @ Las Vegas | L 77–103 | Jewell Loyd (28) | Jewell Loyd (10) | Horston; Whitcomb (4) | Michelob Ultra Arena; 9,319 | 11–26 |
| 38 | September 6 | @ Atlanta | L 68–79 | Jewell Loyd (26) | Ezi Magbegor (8) | Ezi Magbegor (4) | Gateway Center Arena; 2,731 | 11–27 |
| 39 | September 8 | @ Dallas | L 91–106 | Jewell Loyd (33) | Ezi Magbegor (9) | Sami Whitcomb (8) | College Park Center; 4,546 | 11–28 |
| 40 | September 10 | Los Angeles | L 89–91 | Jewell Loyd (28) | Ezi Magbegor (8) | Ezi Magbegor (7) | Climate Pledge Arena; 10,728 | 11–29 |

2023 season schedule

== Standings ==
| # | Team | W | L | PCT | GB | Conf. | Home | Road | Cup |
|---|---|---|---|---|---|---|---|---|---|
| 1 | x – Las Vegas Aces | 34 | 6 | .850 | – | 18–2 | 19–1 | 15–5 | 9–1 |
| 2 | x – New York Liberty | 32 | 8 | .800 | 2 | 16–4 | 15–5 | 17–3 | 7–3 |
| 3 | x – Connecticut Sun | 27 | 13 | .675 | 7 | 14–6 | 13–7 | 14–6 | 7–3 |
| 4 | x – Dallas Wings | 22 | 18 | .550 | 12 | 11–9 | 11–9 | 11–9 | 6–4 |
| 5 | x – Atlanta Dream | 19 | 21 | .475 | 15 | 11–9 | 11–9 | 8–12 | 6–4 |
| 6 | x – Minnesota Lynx | 19 | 21 | .475 | 15 | 12–8 | 9–11 | 10–10 | 5–5 |
| 7 | x – Washington Mystics | 19 | 21 | .475 | 15 | 9–11 | 12–8 | 7–13 | 5–5 |
| 8 | x – Chicago Sky | 18 | 22 | .450 | 16 | 5–15 | 7–13 | 11–9 | 3–7 |
| 9 | e – Los Angeles Sparks | 17 | 23 | .425 | 17 | 9–11 | 10–10 | 7–13 | 5–5 |
| 10 | e – Indiana Fever | 13 | 27 | .325 | 21 | 5–15 | 6–14 | 7–13 | 2–8 |
| 11 | e – Seattle Storm | 11 | 29 | .275 | 23 | 8–12 | 4–16 | 7–13 | 4–6 |
| 12 | e – Phoenix Mercury | 9 | 31 | .225 | 25 | 2–18 | 8–12 | 1–19 | 1–9 |

Notes

(#) – League Standing
x – Clinched playoff berth
e – Eliminated from postseason contention
Source: Overall standings and Commissioner's Cup Standings

== Statistics ==
Legend
| GP | Games played | GS | Games started | MPG | Minutes per game | RPG | Rebounds per game |
| APG | Assists per game | SPG | Steals per game | BPG | Blocks per game | PPG | Points per game |
| FG% | Field-goal percentage | 3P% | 3-point field-goal percentage | FT% | Free-throw percentage | TO | Turnovers per game |
| PF | Fouls per game | | Team leader | | League leader |

=== Regular season ===
| Player | GP | GS | MPG | FG% | 3P% | FT% | RPG | APG | SPG | BPG | PPG |
|---|---|---|---|---|---|---|---|---|---|---|---|
| Jewell Loyd | 38 | 38 | 35.4 | .371 | .357 | .888 | 4.7 | 3.4 | 1.0 | 0.4 | 24.7 |
| Ezi Magbegor | 40 | 40 | 32.6 | .513 | .385 | .699 | 8.1 | 2.6 | 1.1 | 1.9 | 13.8 |
| Sami Whitcomb | 40 | 19 | 24.5 | .400 | .385 | .830 | 2.9 | 2.9 | 0.9 | 0.4 | 9.7 |
| Gabby Williams^{≠} | 10 | 8 | 28.5 | .362 | .217 | .846 | 3.6 | 3.8 | 1.5 | 0.4 | 8.4 |
| Jordan Horston | 36 | 17 | 22.4 | .367 | .244 | .712 | 5.1 | 1.6 | 1.2 | 0.6 | 6.9 |
| Ivana Dojkić^{‡} | 23 | 15 | 20.0 | .403 | .418 | .721 | 1.7 | 2.8 | 0.8 | 0.2 | 6.5 |
| Kia Nurse | 40 | 20 | 19.7 | .343 | .350 | .889 | 2.3 | 1.3 | 0.6 | 0.1 | 5.9 |
| Mercedes Russell | 37 | 13 | 19.1 | .516 | .000 | .605 | 4.0 | 1.3 | 0.4 | 0.5 | 5.0 |
| Dulcy Fankam Mendjiadeu | 33 | 21 | 14.2 | .523 | .000 | .550 | 4.5 | 0.4 | 0.4 | 0.3 | 4.1 |
| Joyner Holmes^{≠} | 29 | 2 | 10.2 | .379 | .317 | .765 | 2.3 | 0.9 | 0.3 | 0.3 | 3.2 |
| Jade Melbourne | 29 | 0 | 10.6 | .391 | .150 | .793 | 1.2 | 1.2 | 0.4 | 0.0 | 2.6 |
| Yvonne Turner | 21 | 7 | 9.2 | .463 | .333 | .778 | 1.1 | 0.9 | 0.4 | 0.1 | 2.5 |
| Kaila Charles^{‡} | 4 | 0 | 10.3 | .250 | .000 | .000 | 1.3 | 0.3 | 0.3 | 0.0 | 1.5 |
| Arella Guirantes^{‡} | 9 | 0 | 5.2 | .250 | .167 | .600 | 0.7 | 0.3 | 0.1 | 0.4 | 1.3 |

^{‡}Waived/Released during the season
^{†}Traded during the season
^{≠}Acquired during the season

== Awards and honors ==
| Recipient | Award | Date awarded | Ref. |
|---|---|---|---|
| Jewell Loyd | Western Conference Player of the Week | June 20 | |
| Jewell Loyd | WNBA All-Star Starter | June 25 | |
| Jewell Loyd | All-Star Game MVP | July 16 | |
| Jewell Loyd | Peak Performer: Points | September 11 | |
| Jewell Loyd | All-WNBA Second Team | October 15 | |
| Ezi Magbegor | WNBA All-Star | July 1 | |
| Ezi Magbegor | All-Defensive Second Team | September 22 | |
| Jordan Horston | WNBA All-Rookie Team | October 2 | |
