= Zia Cooke =

American basketball player (born 2001)

- Cooke with the Seattle Storm in 2026

No. 7 – Seattle Storm
- Position: Point guard
- League: WNBA

Personal information
- Born: January 9, 2001 (age 25) Toledo, Ohio, U.S.
- Listed height: 5 ft 9 in (1.75 m)
- Listed weight: 163 lb (74 kg)

Career information
- High school: Rogers (Toledo, Ohio)
- College: South Carolina (2019–2023)
- WNBA draft: 2023: 1st round, 10th overall pick
- Drafted by: Los Angeles Sparks
- Playing career: 2023–present

Career history
- 2023–2024: Los Angeles Sparks
- 2024: Townsville Fire
- 2025: Danilo's Pizza SK
- 2025–present: Seattle Storm

Career highlights
- NCAA champion (2022); Ann Meyers Drysdale Award (2023); Third-team All-American – AP, USBWA (2023); 2× First-team All-SEC (2021, 2023); Second-team All-SEC (2022); SEC All-Freshman Team (2020); McDonald's All-American (2019)
- Stats at Basketball Reference
Medals
Women's basketball
Representing the United States
FIBA Under-17 World Cup
Gold medal – first place	2018 Belarus	Team
FIBA Americas Under-16 Championship
Gold medal – first place	2017 Argentina	Team

Zia Cooke (born January 9, 2001) is an American professional basketball player for the Seattle Storm of the Women's National Basketball Association (WNBA) and also playing for Athletes Unlimited Pro Basketball. She played college basketball for the South Carolina Gamecocks. At Rogers High School in Toledo, Ohio, she was rated a five-star recruit by ESPN and earned McDonald's All-American honors. A two-time All-SEC selection in college, Cooke helped South Carolina reach the Final Four of the NCAA tournaments in 2021, 2022, and 2023. She was selected tenth overall by the Los Angeles Sparks in the 2023 WNBA draft.

== Early life ==
Cooke grew up playing for a boys youth football team in defiance of her mother, Michelle, who wanted her to join a cheerleading team instead. In seventh grade, she shifted her focus to basketball. Cooke played basketball for Rogers High School in her hometown of Toledo, Ohio. She averaged 21.7 points, 4.6 rebounds, five assists and 3.1 steals per game as a junior. She led her team to the Division II state title, recording 33 points and 14 rebounds in the title game, and was named The Blade Player of the Year. In her senior season, her highlight video drew national attention. As a senior, Cooke averaged 21.7 points, 7.2 rebounds and 4.1 assists per game, winning a second straight state title. She earned Division II Player of the Year honors and repeated as The Blade Player of the Year. Cooke was selected to play in the McDonald's All-American Game. In high school, she also played softball and soccer, and ran track and cross country.

Cooke was rated a five-star recruit and among the top players in the 2019 class by ESPN. On November 5, 2018, she committed to playing college basketball for South Carolina over offers from more than 60 college programs, including Ohio State, Texas, Louisville, Tennessee and Mississippi State.

== College career ==
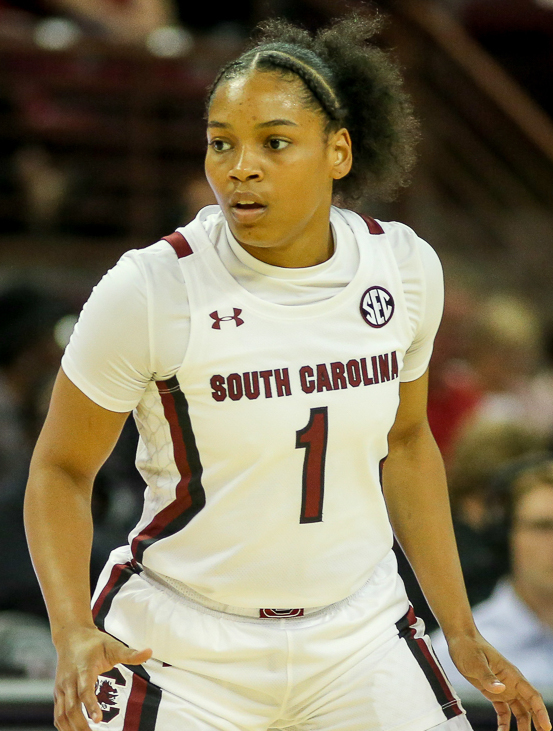
Cooke with South Carolina in 2019

On November 13, 2019, Cooke scored a freshman season-high 27 points with seven rebounds for South Carolina in a 75–49 win against Dayton. She averaged 12.1 points and 2.9 rebounds per game as a freshman, helping her team achieve a 32–1 record and a No. 1 national ranking. Cooke set a program record for games started by a freshman (33), and was selected to the Southeastern Conference (SEC) All-Freshman Team. On December 31, 2020, she recorded a sophomore season-high 26 points in a 75–59 victory over Florida. On April 2, 2021, at the Final Four of the NCAA tournament, Cooke scored a team-high 25 points in a 66–65 loss to Stanford. As a sophomore, she averaged 15.9 points, three rebounds and two assists per game, receiving First Team All-SEC honors. In her junior season, Cooke was named to the Second Team All-SEC.

== Professional career ==
=== WNBA ===
==== Los Angeles Sparks (2023–2024) ====
Cooke was selected tenth overall by the Los Angeles Sparks in the 2023 WNBA draft. In her rookie season, she played 39 games, started 4, and averaged 4.8 points in 14.1 minutes per game.

Cooke's role diminished in her second season with the Sparks. She played in 29 games and averaged 3.6 points in 8.9 minutes per game.

On February 1, 2025, Cooke was waived by the Sparks.

==== Seattle Storm (2025) ====
On February 12, 2025, Cooke signed with the Seattle Storm. She made the opening day roster. On August 5, she was traded to the Washington Mystics along with Alysha Clark and Seattle's first-round pick in the 2026 draft in exchange for Brittney Sykes. Cooke was subsequently waived by the Mystics. On August 18, Cooke was resigned to the Storm for a rest of season contract.

=== Overseas ===
Cooke signed with the Townsville Fire of the Women's National Basketball League (WNBL) for the 2024–2025 season. She parted ways with the team in December. In January 2025, she signed with Danilo's Pizza SK of the Turkish Super League.

=== Athletes Unlimited ===
Cooke made her Athletes Unlimited Pro Basketball debut during the league's 2024 season, where she appeared in 12 games and averaged 15.8 points per contest. She also contributed rebounds and assists while logging significant minutes in the backcourt, establishing herself as a consistent scoring option. In December 2025, Cooke returned to Athletes Unlimited Pro Basketball following her participation in the league's 2024 season.

== National team career ==
Cooke represented the United States at the 2017 FIBA Under-16 Americas Championship in Argentina. She led her team to the gold medal, averaging 10.8 points per game. She recorded 15 points and four rebounds against Canada in the final. Cooke won her second gold medal at the 2018 FIBA Under-17 World Cup in Belarus, after averaging 7.9 points and 2.9 rebounds per game.

== Career statistics ==
Legend
GP	Games played	GS	Games started	MPG	Minutes per game	RPG	Rebounds per game
APG	Assists per game	SPG	Steals per game	BPG	Blocks per game	PPG	Points per game
TO	Turnovers per game	FG%	Field-goal percentage	3P%	3-point field-goal percentage	FT%	Free-throw percentage
**Bold**	Career best	°	League leader

*	Denotes season(s) in which Cooke won an NCAA Championship

=== WNBA ===
==== Regular season ====
Stats current as of end of 2026 season

WNBA regular season statistics
Year	Team	GP	GS	MPG	FG%	3P%	FT%	RPG	APG	SPG	BPG	TO	PPG
2023	Los Angeles	39	**4**	14.1	.289	.261	**.813**	0.9	0.8	0.3	**0.3**	**0.7**	4.8
2024	Los Angeles	29	0	8.9	.321	.297	.690	0.6	0.6	0.3	0.1	**0.7**	3.6
2025	Seattle	26	0	10.4	**.357**	**.395**	.652	0.5	0.5	**0.4**	0.0	0.8	3.5
2026	Seattle	**41**	1	**15.0**	.347	.300	.773	**1.7**	**1.1**	**0.4**	0.0	1.1	**7.5**
**Career**	4 years, 2 teams	135	5	12.5	.326	.300	.773	1.0	0.8	0.4	0.1	0.9	5.1

==== Playoffs ====
WNBA playoff statistics
Year	Team	GP	GS	MPG	FG%	3P%	FT%	RPG	APG	SPG	BPG	TO	PPG
2025	Seattle	1	0	7.0	.333	.000	.500	0.0	1.0	0.0	0.0	1.0	3.0
**Career**	1 year, 1 team	1	0	7.0	.333	.000	.500	0.0	1.0	0.0	0.0	1.0	3.0

=== College ===
NCAA statistics
Year	Team	GP	GS	MPG	FG%	3P%	FT%	RPG	APG	SPG	BPG	TO	PPG
2019–20	South Carolina	33	33	26.5	38.6	35.4	71.2	2.9	1.8	**1.1**	**0.2**	**1.8**	12.0
2020–21	South Carolina	31	31	**32.1**	39.0	**39.3**	77.2	**3.0**	**2.0**	0.9	0.0	2.5	**15.9**
2021–22*	South Carolina	36	36	27.1	34.2	28.7	70.5	2.1	1.7	0.6	0.1	2.1	10.7
2022–23	South Carolina	**37**	**37**	26.7	**40.5**	34.6	**79.2**	2.1	1.9	0.8	0.1	**1.8**	15.4
**Career**		137	137	28.0	38.2	34.1	75.1	2.5	1.9	0.9	0.1	2.0	13.5

== Off the court ==
As a junior in college, Cooke, signed a sponsorship deal with H&R Block as one of the first participants in the company's "A Fair Shot" campaign to provide $1 million in support for female college athletes. She has also signed name, image and likeness deals with Dick's Sporting Goods and Bojangles.
