= Clare Duwelius =

American basketball executive (born 1989)

Claire Duwelius

1st Executive Vice President and General Manager of Unrivaled
- Incumbent
- Assumed office November 11, 2024

Personal details
- Born: April 18, 1989 (age 36) Des Moines, Iowa, U.S.
- Education: Wayne State College; Southwest Minnesota State University
- Occupation: Executive Vice President and General Manager of Unrivaled

Clare Duwelius (born April 18, 1989) is an American basketball executive who is the General Manager and Executive Vice President of Unrivaled. Duwelius was formerly the general manager of the Minnesota Lynx of the Women's National Basketball Association (WNBA) after having started her career with the Lynx in 2014 as the Basketball Operations Coordinator, then being elevated to Basketball Operations Manager in 2016 and later assistant general manager in 2018.

== Early life ==
Duwelius was raised in Des Moines, Iowa. She attended Dowling Catholic High School while growing up and then went to Wayne State College in Wayne, Nebraska to play basketball. She hit a game-winning three-pointer during the Northern Sun Intercollegiate Conference tournament to help lead the Wildcats to the conference title. Duwelius concluded her career at WSC as the program's all-time leader in 3-point field goals made (252) and was named first team All-NSIC in 2012, helping lead Wayne State to the NCAA Elite Eight. She was also named the 2008-2009 NSIC Freshman of the Year.

Following her playing career, Duwelius went on to become a graduate assistant coach at Southwest Minnesota State University in Marshall, Minnesota. While working on her master's degree at SMSU, Duwelius assisted in all operations of the women's basketball program, such as practice planning, facility preparation, equipment managing, team travel and video exchange.

== Executive career ==
=== Minnesota Lynx ===
Duwelius began her career in the WNBA as the basketball operations coordinator with the Minnesota Lynx in 2014. She had been promoted to assistant general manager in 2018. After spending the last five years in that role, in December 2022, the Lynx announced Duwelius as their new general manager, the fourth overall in franchise history.

Duwelius's WNBA Draft experience as General Manager, she selected Diamond Miller and Dorka Juhász in the 2023 WNBA draft. Both Miller and Juhász were named to the All-Rookie Team during the 2023 season. Following the 2023 season, Duwelius and President of Basketball Operations/Head Coach Cheryl Reeve retooled the Lynx roster and brought in Courtney Williams, Alanna Smith, Natisha Hiedeman, Sika Koné, and Olivia Époupa through signings and trades. She also brought back Cecilia Zandalasini, who previously played in Minnesota, as well as drafted Alissa Pili. The Lynx won the 2024 WNBA Commissioner's Cup with their retooled roster on June 25, 2024.

=== Unrivaled ===
On November 11, 2024, Duwelius was named as executive vice president and general manager of Unrivaled, a women's 3v3 basketball league founded by Napheesa Collier and Breanna Stewart.

== See also ==
- Minnesota Lynx
- Unrivaled (basketball league)
