= Joyner Holmes =

American basketball player (born 1998)

Personal information
- Born: February 22, 1998 (age 28) Dallas, Texas, U.S.
- Listed height: 6 ft 3 in (1.91 m)
- Listed weight: 210 lb (95 kg)

Career information
- High school: Cedar Hill (Cedar Hill, Texas)
- College: Texas (2016–2020)
- WNBA draft: 2020: 2nd round, 19th overall pick
- Drafted by: Seattle Storm
- Playing career: 2020–present
- Position: Power Forward

Career history
- 2020–2021: New York Liberty
- 2021: Las Vegas Aces
- 2022: Connecticut Sun
- 2023: Los Angeles Sparks
- 2023–2024: Seattle Storm
- 2024–2025: Athinaikos
- 2025: Las Vegas Aces
- 2026: Seattle Storm

Career highlights
- First-team All-Big 12 (2017); Big 12 Freshman of the Year (2017); Big 12 All-Freshman Team (2017); McDonald's All-American (2016); Texas Miss Basketball (2016)
- Stats at Basketball Reference
Medals
Representing United States
Women's basketball
FIBA Under-19 World Cup
Silver medal – second place	2017 Italy	Team
FIBA Under-17 World Cup
Gold medal – first place	2014 Czech Republic	Team

Joyner Michelle Holmes (born February 22, 1998) is an American professional basketball player who most recently played for the Seattle Storm of the Women's National Basketball Association (WNBA). She has played for the New York Liberty and the Las Vegas Aces. She played college basketball for the Texas Longhorns.

== Early life ==
Holmes played high school basketball for Cedar Hill High School. In her senior year, she averaged 24.8 points per game, 8.1 rebounds per game, 2.4 assists per game, 2.6 steals per game and 0.8 blocks per game. She was named Co-MVP of the 2016 Jordan Brand Classic game. She participated in the 2016 McDonald’s All-American game and she was ranked No. 3 by ESPN HoopGurlz in the 2016 recruiting class.

== College career ==
Holmes attended the University of Texas, where she played for the Longhorns women's basketball team, In her freshman season, she averaged 12.1 points, 8.2 rebounds and 1.9 assists per game. In her Sophomore season, she averaged 6.8 points, 6.0 rebounds and 1.4 assists per game. In her junior year, she averaged 11.8 points, 6.7 rebounds and 1.7 assists per game. In her senior year, she averaged 13.1 points, 8.7 rebounds and 2 assists per game.

== Professional career ==
On April 17, 2020, the Seattle Storm selected Holmes as the 19th pick in the second round of the 2020 WNBA draft.

On June 26, 2020, Holmes signed with the New York Liberty.

Holmes joined the Dallas Wings for the 2025 season Training Camp but was waived on May 14, 2025.

On June 11, 2025, Holmes signed with the Las Vegas Aces.

On May 22, 2026, Holmes signed a hardship contract with the Seattle Storm.

== National team career ==
Holmes helped the United States under-17 team win a gold medal at the 2014 FIBA U-17 World Championship, She averaged 10.6 points, 5.7 rebounds and 1 assist per game. She also won a silver medal at the 2017 FIBA Under-19 Women's Basketball World Cup with the United States under-19 team, and she averaged 9 points, 8.7 rebounds and 1.9 assists per game.

== Career statistics ==
Legend
GP	Games played	GS	Games started	MPG	Minutes per game	RPG	Rebounds per game
APG	Assists per game	SPG	Steals per game	BPG	Blocks per game	PPG	Points per game
TO	Turnovers per game	FG%	Field-goal percentage	3P%	3-point field-goal percentage	FT%	Free-throw percentage
**Bold**	Career best	°	League leader

=== WNBA ===
==== Regular season ====
Stats current as of game on July 3, 2025

WNBA regular season statistics
Year	Team	GP	GS	MPG	FG%	3P%	FT%	RPG	APG	SPG	BPG	TO	PPG
2020	New York	19	0	10.0	.306	.107	.750	2.7	0.7	0.1	0.1	0.7	2.9
2021	New York	1	0	5.0	—	—	—	0.0	**1.0**	0.0	0.0	1.0	0.0
2021	Las Vegas	4	0	5.8	**.500**	**.750**	—	1.0	0.5	0.0	**0.3**	**0.3**	3.3
2022	Connecticut	26	0	7.9	.311	.227	**.769**	1.3	0.5	**0.3**	0.1	0.7	2.0
2023	Los Angeles	5	0	**12.0**	.348	.286	.750	**3.4**	0.2	0.0	0.4	0.8	**4.2**
2023	Seattle	**29**	**2**	10.2	.379	.317	.765	2.3	0.9	**0.3**	**0.3**	0.5	3.2
2024	Seattle	27	0	8.6	.423	.194	.636	1.8	0.9	0.2	0.2	0.8	2.9
2025	Las Vegas	6	0	4.8	.250	.200	—	1.0	0.0	0.0	0.0	0.3	1.2
**Career**	6 years, 5 teams	117	2	8.9	.359	.239	.737	2.0	0.7	0.2	0.2	0.6	2.7

==== Playoffs ====
WNBA playoff statistics
Year	Team	GP	GS	MPG	FG%	3P%	FT%	RPG	APG	SPG	BPG	TO	PPG
2022	Connecticut	7	0	4.1	.500	.000	1.000	1.3	0.7	0.1	0.0	0.1	0.9
2024	Seattle	1	0	2.0	—	—	—	0.0	0.0	0.0	0.0	0.0	0.0
**Career**	2 years, 2 teams	8	0	3.9	.500	.000	1.000	1.1	0.6	0.1	0.0	0.1	0.8

=== College ===
Ratios
Year	Team	GP	FG%	3P%	FT%	RBG	APG	BPG	SPG	PPG
2016–17	Texas	**34**	43.6%	16.7%	**68.2%**	8.18	1.85	**1.12**	0.77	12.09
2017–18	Texas	25	38.4%	–	56.5%	6.04	1.40	0.40	0.40	6.84
2018–19	Texas	25	**45.4%**	**26.5%**	49.4%	6.68	1.72	0.40	0.96	11.80
2019–20	Texas	30	40.9%	18.2%	62.2%	**8.67**	**2.07**	1.00	**1.47**	**13.10**
Career		114	42.4%	19.8%	60.2%	7.51	1.78	0.77	0.91	11.14

Totals
Year	Team	GP	FG	FGA	3P	3PA	FT	FTA	REB	A	BK	ST	PTS
2016–17	Texas	**34**	**168**	385	2	12	73	**107**	**278**	**63**	**38**	26	**411**
2017–18	Texas	25	68	177	0	7	35	62	151	35	10	10	171
2018–19	Texas	25	124	273	**9**	**34**	38	77	167	43	10	24	295
2019–20	Texas	30	163	**399**	6	33	**61**	98	260	62	30	**44**	393
Career		114	523	1234	17	86	207	344	856	203	88	104	1270
