= Diamond Miller =

American basketball player (born 2001)

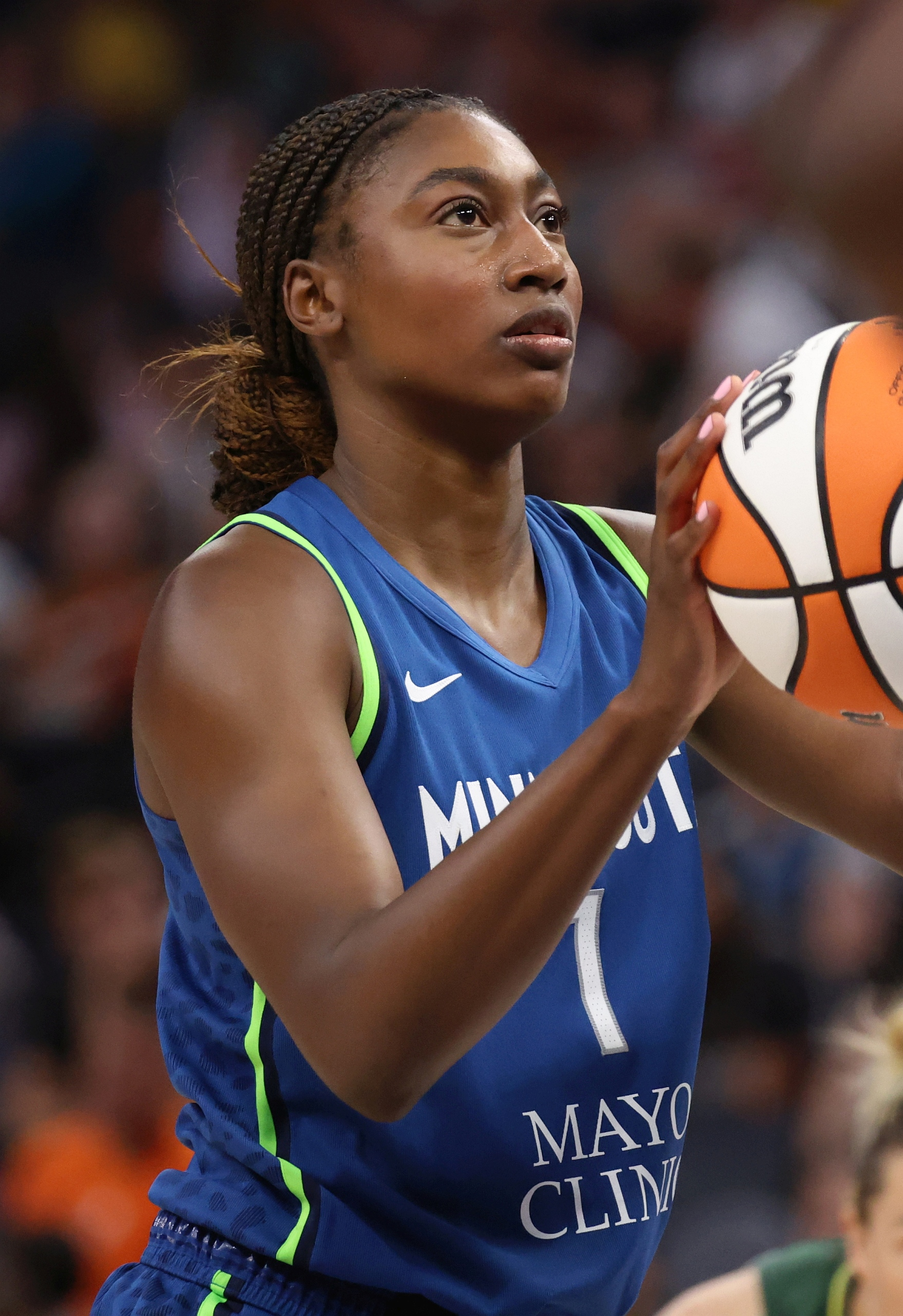
- Miller with the Minnesota Lynx in 2023

No. 1 – Houston Comets
- Position: Forward
- League: WNBA

Personal information
- Born: February 11, 2001 (age 25) Montclair, New Jersey, U.S.
- Listed height: 6 ft 1 in (1.85 m)
- Listed weight: 178 lb (81 kg)

Career information
- High school: Franklin (Somerset, New Jersey)
- College: Maryland (2019–2023)
- WNBA draft: 2023: 1st round, 2nd overall pick
- Drafted by: Minnesota Lynx
- Playing career: 2023–present

Career history
- 2023–2025: Minnesota Lynx
- 2023: SERCO UNI Győr
- 2024–2025: AZS AJP Gorzów Wielkopolski
- 2025: Dallas Wings
- 2026: Athinaikos
- 2026: Connecticut Sun
- 2027–present: Houston Comets

Career highlights
- WNBA Commissioner's Cup Champion (2024); WNBA All-Rookie Team (2023); Second-team All-American – AP, USBWA (2023); WBCA Coaches' All-American (2023); 2× First-team All-Big Ten (2021, 2023); Second-team All-Big Ten (2022); Big Ten tournament MOP (2021); McDonald's All-American (2019)
- Stats at Basketball Reference
Medals
Women's basketball
Representing the United States
FIBA AmeriCup
Gold medal – first place	2021 Puerto Rico	Team
FIBA Under-19 World Cup
Gold medal – first place	2019 Thailand	Team
FIBA Americas Under-16 Championship
Gold medal – first place	2017 Argentina	Team

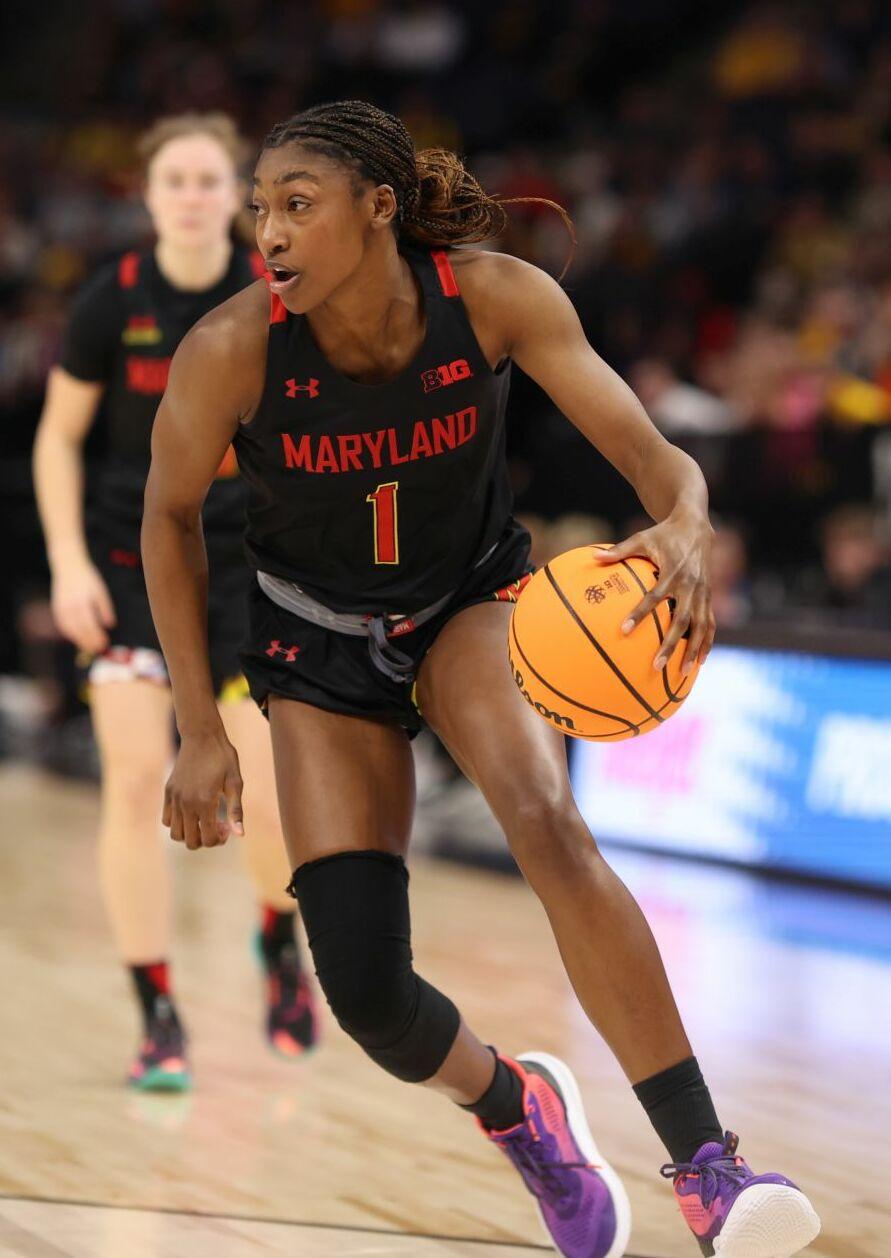
Miller with Maryland at the 2023 Big Ten tournament

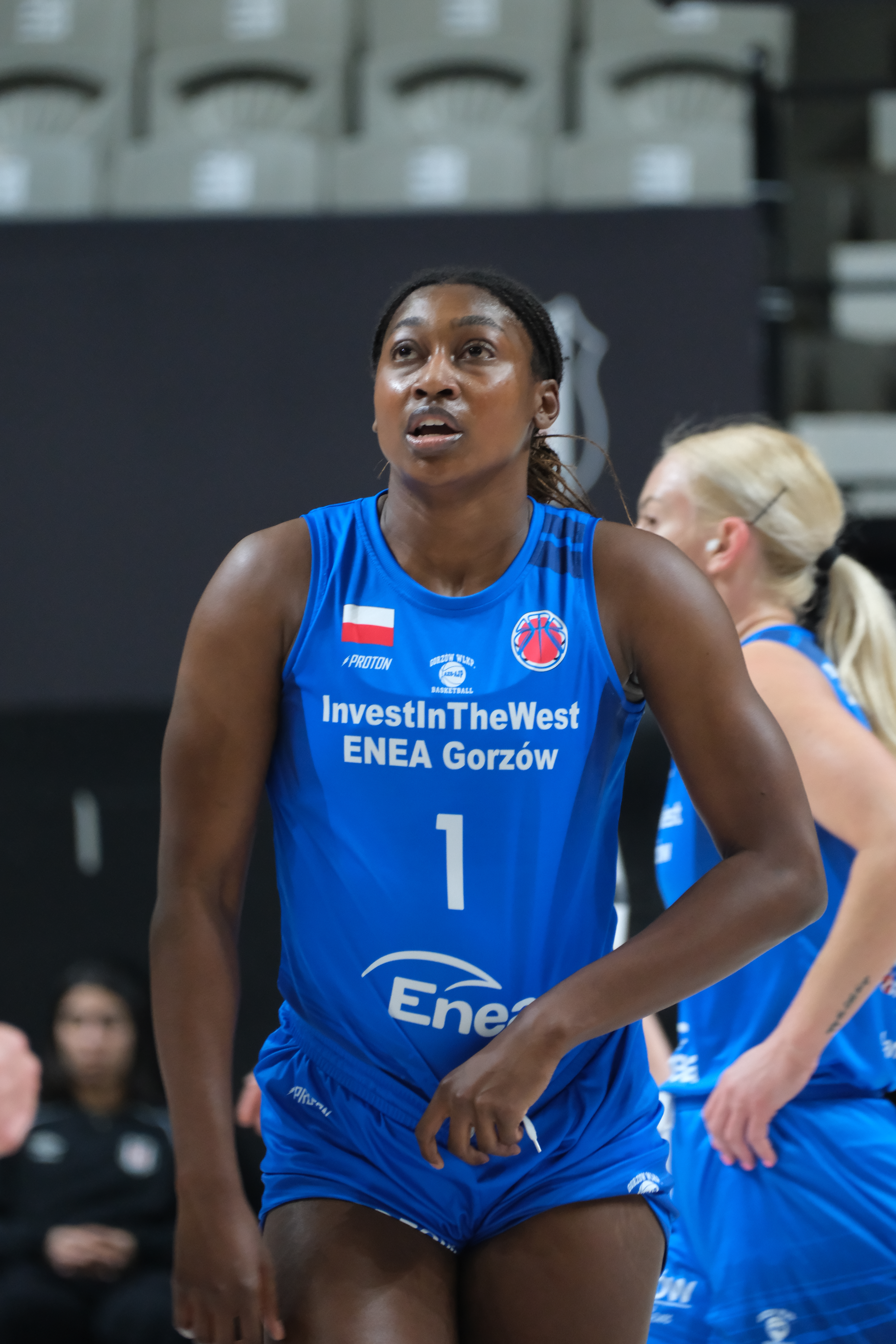
Miller with AZS AJP in season 2024–2025

Diamond Miller (born February 11, 2001) is an American professional basketball player for the Houston Comets of the Women's National Basketball Association (WNBA). She played college basketball for the Maryland Terrapins. Miller attended Franklin High School in Somerset, New Jersey, where she was rated a five-star recruit by ESPN and earned McDonald's All-American honors in 2019. At Maryland, she was named an All-American as a senior, won Most Outstanding Player of the 2021 Big Ten tournament and left as a three-time All-Big Ten selection. Miller won a gold medal with the United States national team at the 2021 FIBA Women's AmeriCup. She was selected 2nd overall in the 2023 WNBA draft by the Minnesota Lynx.

== Early life ==
Miller grew up playing basketball and soccer. In her childhood, she played basketball with her two older sisters, Adreana and LaNiya, who inspired her to pursue the sport. Miller looked up to Candace Parker, Stephen Curry and Kevin Durant. She was coached by her father, Lance, with Team Miller Lightning in the Amateur Athletic Union. Miller was a four-year varsity player at Franklin High School in Somerset, New Jersey. She averaged 15.5 points per game as a freshman. In her sophomore season, Miller averaged 18.1 points, 6.6 rebounds and 3.8 blocks per game, leading Franklin to a New Jersey Tournament of Champions and Group 4 state titles.

As a junior, Miller averaged 23.8 points, 7.7 rebounds, 3.8 assists and 3.8 blocks per game, and was named Courier News Player of the Year for 2018. She broke her own program single-season scoring record and surpassed her sister, Adreana, as Franklin's all-time leading scorer. Miller led her team to the Group 4 state championship, scoring 27 points against Toms River High School North in the title game. In her senior season in 2018–19, she averaged 21.8 points, 8.7 rebounds and 3.1 blocks per game, repeating as Courier News Player of the Year. Miller led her team to a 34–0 record, another Tournament of Champions title, and the Group 4 state title. She was named New Jersey Gatorade Player of the Year, NJ.com Player of the Year, and USA Today New Jersey Player of the Year. She was selected to play in the McDonald's All-American Game.

Miller was considered a five-star recruit and the number 17 player in the 2019 class by ESPN. She received her first college basketball scholarship offer from Villanova, her father's alma mater, in eighth grade. On March 10, 2018, she committed to playing college basketball for Maryland over an offer from Notre Dame. Miller was drawn to the program by its coaching staff and proximity. On November 14, she signed her National Letter of Intent with Maryland.

== College career ==
In her freshman season at Maryland, Miller was a key reserve for Maryland. On November 24, 2019, she scored a season-high 17 points in a 107–52 win against Quinnipiac. As a freshman, Miller averaged 7.7 points and 3.2 rebounds per game. Her team won the Big Ten tournament and were contenders for the NCAA tournament, which was canceled amid the COVID-19 pandemic. Miller assumed a leading role alongside Ashley Owusu in her sophomore season. On December 3, 2020, she scored a season-high 28 points, shooting 5-of-7 from three-point range, in a 112–78 win over Towson. Miller posted 15 points and six assists in a 104–84 win against Iowa to capture her second Big Ten tournament title. She was named tournament Most Outstanding Player. As a sophomore, Miller averaged 17.3 points, 5.8 rebounds and 2.9 assists, earning first-team All-Big Ten honors.

She was limited to begin her junior season due to a lingering knee injury, and missed 10 of her first 12 games. On January 6, 2022, Miller scored a season-high 24 points in a 106–78 victory over Penn State. She scored 24 points, with nine rebounds, three assists and three steals, in an 89–65 win over Florida Gulf Coast at the second round of the 2022 NCAA tournament. As a junior, Miller averaged 13.1 points, 4.1 rebounds and 2.8 assists per game, making the All-Big Ten second team. Following the season, she underwent knee surgery and was sidelined for three to six months. On November 20, 2022, Miller recorded a career-high 32 points and 10 rebounds in a 73–68 win over Baylor. On December 1, she had 31 points, 12 rebounds and five assists, making the game-winning buzzer-beater, in a 74–72 victory over Notre Dame. Miller was a unanimous first-team All-Big Ten selection by the league's coaches and media. She was named a second-team All-American by the Associated Press and the United States Basketball Writers Association, and made the Women's Basketball Coaches Association Coaches' All-America team. As a senior, Miller averaged 19.7 points, 6.6 rebounds, 2.9 assists and 2.1 steals per game, and set the program single-season record with 201 free throws made. She declared for the 2023 WNBA draft, where she was considered one of the top prospects.

== Professional career ==
=== WNBA ===
==== Minnesota Lynx (2023–2025) ====
Miller was selected 2nd overall in the 2023 WNBA draft by the Minnesota Lynx. Miller made her WNBA debut on May 19, 2023, against the Chicago Sky as a starter scoring 9 points and grabbing 7 rebounds. In the July 26, 2023, Lynx home game against the Washington Mystics, she became the first WNBA rookie to ever score 20 or more points (she had 21), have 9 or more assists, and only have 1 or no turnovers. The WNBA named her the Rookie of the Month for July 2023. She was named to the 2023 WNBA All-Rookie team along with her teammate, Dorka Juhász. In her rookie year, Miller became the third Lynx player to tally "at least 380 points, 110 rebounds, 30 steals and 10 blocks, joining Napheesa Collier (2019) and Maya Moore (2011) to achieve this feat."

In her second season with the Lynx, Miller started the first three games. However, an injury sustained in the third game sidelined her for more than a month. With Bridget Carleton replacing her successfully in the starting lineup, Miller played only sporadically for the remainder of the season and averaged only 10.1 minutes and 2.9 points per game in the regular season. She saw the floor for only a few minutes total during the Lynx’s successful playoff run to the WNBA Finals.

==== Dallas Wings (2025–2026) ====
On August 3, 2025, Miller was traded to the Dallas Wings along with Karlie Samuelson and a 2027 second-round draft pick, in exchange for DiJonai Carrington.

==== Connecticut Sun/Houston Comets (2026–present) ====
On April 9, 2026, Miller was traded to the Connecticut Sun, in exchange for Rayah Marshall.

=== Overseas ===
==== SERCO UNI Győr ====
Miller signed with SERCO UNI Győr of the Nemzeti Bajnokság I/A for the 2023–2024 season. However, she ended up playing only one EuroLeague game (vs Bologna: 24 points, 5 rebounds, 6 assists) and one Hungarian League game (vs BEAC: 16 points, 5 rebounds, 3 assists). On 13 December 2023, Miller was waived by Győr because of her knee injury.

==== Gorzów ====
Miller signed with AZS AJP Gorzów Wielkopolski of the Basket Liga Kobiet for the 2024–2025 season. She won the Polish Cup with the team and reached the Polish league finals, where Gorzów fell 0–3 to Arka Gdynia.

== Career statistics ==
Legend
GP	Games played	GS	Games started	MPG	Minutes per game	RPG	Rebounds per game
APG	Assists per game	SPG	Steals per game	BPG	Blocks per game	PPG	Points per game
TO	Turnovers per game	FG%	Field-goal percentage	3P%	3-point field-goal percentage	FT%	Free-throw percentage
**Bold**	Career best	°	League leader

=== WNBA ===
==== Regular season ====
Stats current through end of 2025 season

WNBA regular season statistics
Year	Team	GP	GS	MPG	FG%	3P%	FT%	RPG	APG	SPG	BPG	TO	PPG
2023	Minnesota	32	32	**26.1**	.403	.307	.792	**3.5**	**2.5**	**0.9**	**0.3**	2.3	**12.1**
2024	Minnesota	21	4	10.1	.304	.192	.583	1.8	0.6	0.3	0.0	0.9	2.9
2025	Minnesota	25	0	9.7	**.476**	**.538**	**.848**	0.9	0.6	0.3	0.2	**0.8**	4.1
2025	Dallas	15	1	12.7	.338	.120	.538	2.0	1.1	0.3	0.2	0.9	3.9
2026	Connecticut	**43**	**43**	22.7	.365	.325	.771	2.7	1.4	0.7	**0.3**	1.4	9.8
**Career**	4 years, 3 teams	136	80	18.1	.380	.311	.761	2.3	1.4	0.6	0.2	1.4	7.6

==== Playoffs ====
WNBA playoff statistics
Year	Team	GP	GS	MPG	FG%	3P%	FT%	RPG	APG	SPG	BPG	TO	PPG
2023	Minnesota	3	**3**	**23.0**	**.261**	**.222**	**.667**	**1.3**	**2.0**	**1.0**	0.0	**0.3**	**5.3**
2024	Minnesota	**6**	0	0.7	—	—	—	0.0	0.0	0.0	0.0	0.0	0.0
**Career**	2 years, 1 team	9	3	8.1	.261	.222	.667	0.4	0.7	0.3	0.0	0.1	1.8

=== College ===
NCAA statistics
Year	Team	GP	GS	MPG	FG%	3P%	FT%	RPG	APG	SPG	BPG	TO	PPG
2019–20	Maryland	32	3	19.1	40.9	31.5	73.4	3.2	1.8	0.9	0.6	**1.6**	7.7
2020–21	Maryland	29	29	27.5	**50.6**	**35.5**	79.3	5.8	**2.9**	1.4	1.0	2.6	17.3
2021–22	Maryland	22	18	28.5	40.8	31.6	78.6	4.0	2.8	1.4	0.9	3.0	13.1
2022–23	Maryland	**34**	**34**	**28.8**	47.6	22.0	**79.8**	**6.4**	**2.9**	**2.1**	**1.3**	3.2	**19.7**
**Career**		117	84	25.7	45.9	30.3	78.7	4.9	2.6	1.5	0.9	2.6	14.6

== National team career ==
Miller represented the United States at the 2017 FIBA Under-16 Women's Americas Championship in Argentina. She averaged 6.4 points, 5.6 rebounds and two steals per game, helping her team win the gold medal. Miller recorded 10 points, four rebounds and two steals in a 91–46 win over Canada in the final. She was a late addition to the United States team for the 2019 FIBA Under-19 Women's Basketball World Cup in Thailand. Miller averaged two points and 1.3 rebounds per game en route to a gold medal. She made her debut for the United States senior national team at the 2021 FIBA Women's AmeriCup in Puerto Rico. Miller averaged 4.7 points, four rebounds and two assists per game for the gold medal-winning team.

== Personal life ==
Miller is the daughter of Dreana and Lance Miller. Her father played professional basketball in Europe after a college career at Villanova. Miller's two sisters have played college basketball: Adreana at La Salle and Ohio State, and LaNiya at Stony Brook and Wagner. She majored in family science at the University of Maryland, College Park.

In 2023, Miller attended Kelsey Plum's Dawg Class, an Under Armour-sponsored camp to help top women college athletes transition from collegiate to professional basketball.
