= Dulcy Fankam Mendjiadeu =

American-Cameroonian basketball player (born 1999)

No. 12 – Dallas Wings
- Position: Forward/Center
- League: WNBA

Personal information
- Born: July 26, 1999 (age 27) Nkongsamba, Cameroon
- Listed height: 6 ft 3 in (1.91 m)
- Listed weight: 204 lb (93 kg)

Career information
- High school: Lycee du Manengouba Nkongsamba (Nkongsamba, Cameroon)
- College: Walters State CC (2018–2019); Memphis (2019–2021); South Florida (2021–2023)
- WNBA draft: 2023: 2nd round, 21st overall pick
- Drafted by: Seattle Storm
- Playing career: 2023–present

Career history
- 2023–2024: Seattle Storm
- 2023–2024: IDK Gipuzkoa
- 2024–2025: Basket Lattes Montpellier Agglomération
- 2025–2026: Crvena zvezda
- 2026: Dallas Wings

Career highlights
- AAC co-Player of the Year (2023); First-team All-AAC (2023); Second-team All-AAC (2022); Second-team NJCAA All-American (2019); First-team All-TCCAA (2019)
- Stats at Basketball Reference
Medals
Women's basketball
Representing Cameroon
AfroBasket
Bronze medal – third place	2021 Cameroon

Dulcy Fankam Mendjiadeu (born July 26, 1999) is a Cameroonian professional basketball player for the Dallas Wings of the WNBA. She was selected 21st overall in the 2023 WNBA draft by the Seattle Storm. She played college at South Florida.

Mendijadeu was released by the Dallas Wings on June 2, 2026

== Early life ==
She attended Lycee Manengouba Nkongsamba in her hometown and ranked No. 3 overall in Cameroon coming out of high school.

== College career ==
Dulcy previously played for Walters State Community College in Morristown, Tennessee in her junior year (2018–2019). In her one season at Walters, she averaged 15.5 points, 8.8 rebounds, and 1.6 blocks per game, also 18.1 points and 9.5 rebounds per game in conference play. And she was named the "TCCAA Women’s Co-Most Valuable Player". She then played at the University of Memphis for 2 seasons, before transferring to the University of South Florida(2019–2020) and in 31 games she averaged 12.2 points and 8.6 rebounds per game.

== Career statistics ==
Legend
GP	Games played	GS	Games started	MPG	Minutes per game	RPG	Rebounds per game
APG	Assists per game	SPG	Steals per game	BPG	Blocks per game	PPG	Points per game
TO	Turnovers per game	FG%	Field-goal percentage	3P%	3-point field-goal percentage	FT%	Free-throw percentage
**Bold**	Career best	°	League leader

=== WNBA ===
==== Regular season ====
Stats current through end of 2024 season

WNBA regular season statistics
Year	Team	GP	GS	MPG	FG%	3P%	FT%	RPG	APG	SPG	BPG	TO	PPG
2023	Seattle	**33**	**21**	**14.2**	.523	.000	**.550**	**4.4**	**0.4**	**0.4**	**0.3**	0.9	**4.1**
2024	Seattle	7	0	5.1	**.667**	—	.333	1.3	0.1	0.0	0.0	**0.4**	0.9
**Career**	2 years, 1 team	41	21	12.3	.527	.000	.522	3.9	0.3	0.3	0.3	0.8	3.4

== National team career ==
She helped her native country, Cameroon, to the semifinals of the 2021 FIBA AfroBasket in September. She had 16 points, 18 rebounds, three blocked shots, and three steals in a 67–61 win over Egypt in the quarterfinals.
