= 2024 Seattle Storm season =

WNBA basketball season

- Head coach: Noelle Quinn
- Arena: Climate Pledge Arena; Seattle, Washington, U.S.

Results
- Record: 25–15 (.625)
- Place: 3rd (Western)
- Playoff finish: 5th seed; Lost in First Round 0–2 to Las Vegas

The 2024 season for the Seattle Storm, a professional American basketball team based in Seattle, Washington, was their 25th season in the Women's National Basketball Association (WNBA). It was their third full season with Noelle Quinn as head coach. The Storm play their home games at Climate Pledge Arena in the Lower Queen Anne neighborhood of Seattle; the 2024 season was their first at a new training facility, the Seattle Storm Center for Basketball Performance in Interbay.

The team's regular season schedule began on May 14 and included 40 games against the other eleven teams in WNBA. Four games were played against five teams from the Western Conference and two teams from the Eastern Conference; the Storm played three games each against the remaining four teams from the Eastern Conference. Five regular season games in early June were played against teams in the same conference to determine qualification for the WNBA Commissioner's Cup, an in-season tournament first played in 2021.

The Storm played 10 road games out of their first 15 games and returned to Seattle for nine consecutive games at home from June 23 to July 14. The 2024 WNBA season included a month-long break for the Summer Olympic Games that began after the WNBA All-Star Game on July 20 in Phoenix, Arizona.

The Storm finished 25–15 overall, which was fifth place during the regular season. Their 25 wins were the most since the 2018 season. As the fifth seed in the 2024 WNBA Playoffs, they faced off against the Las Vegas Aces in the First Round. The Storm were swept two games to zero, losing the first game 67–78 and the second 73–86 to end their season.

== Transactions ==
=== WNBA draft ===
Round	Pick	Player	Nationality	School/Team/Country
2	14	Nika Mühl	Croatia	UConn
3	26	Mackenzie Holmes	United States	Indiana

=== Transactions ===
Date	Transaction
January 16, 2024	Extended a Qualifying Offer to Joyner Holmes
January 29, 2024	Signed Joyner Holmes to a Training Camp Contract
January 31, 2024	Acquired Los Angeles' 1st Round pick in the 2026 draft in exchange for Kia Nurse and the 4th overall pick in the 2024 draft.
February 1, 2024	Signed Skylar Diggins-Smith
February 5, 2024	Signed Nneka Ogwumike
February 23, 2024	Signed Alaina Coates, Kaela Davis, and Kiana Williams to a Training Camp Contracts
March 25, 2024	Signed Victoria Vivians
April 22, 2024	Signed Nika Mühl and Quay Miller to Rookie Contracts
May 8, 2024	Waived Alaina Coates, Kaela Davis, and Quay Miller
May 11, 2024	Traded Jade Melbourne to the Washington Mystics for a 2025 third round draft pick
May 13, 2024	Waived Joyner Holmes
May 31, 2024	Waived Dulcy Fankam Mendjiadeu
June 3, 2024	Signed Joyner Holmes
July 2, 2024	Waived Kiana Williams
July 5, 2024	Signed Kiana Williams to a 7-day contract
July 12, 2024	Released Kiana Williams (contract ended)
July 14, 2024	Signed Kiana Williams to a 7-day contract
August 19, 2024	Released Kiana Williams (contract ended)
August 19, 2024	Signed Gabby Williams

=== Roster changes ===
==== Additions ====
Personnel	Signed/Trade	Former team
Skylar Diggins-Smith	Signed	Phoenix Mercury
Nika Mühl	Draft	Connecticut
Nneka Ogwumike	Signed	Los Angeles Sparks
Victoria Vivians	Signed	Indiana Fever
Gabby Williams	Signed	—
Kiana Williams	Signed (7-day contract)	—

==== Subtractions ====
Personnel	Reason	New team
Tina Charles	Free agency	Atlanta Dream
Ivana Dojkić	Free agency	New York Liberty
Joyner Holmes	Waived	—
Jade Melbourne	Trade	Washington Mystics
Kia Nurse	Trade	Los Angeles Sparks
Yvonne Turner	Free agency	—
Gabby Williams	Free agency	—

== Roster ==
2024 Seattle Storm roster
Players
Coaches

Pos.	No.	Nat.	Name	Height	Weight	DOB	From	Yrs
G	4	(United States)	Diggins-Smith, Skylar	5' 9" (1.75m)	145 lb (66kg)	1990-08-02	Notre Dame	9
F	8	(United States)	Holmes, Joyner	6' 3" (1.91m)	210 lb (95kg)	1998-02-22	Texas	4
G/F	23	(United States)	Horston, Jordan	6' 2" (1.88m)	165 lb (75kg)	2001-05-21	Tennessee	1
G	24	(United States)	Loyd, Jewell	5' 11" (1.8m)	165 lb (75kg)	1993-10-05	Notre Dame	9
C	13	(Australia)	Magbegor, Ezi	6' 4" (1.93m)	181 lb (82kg)	1999-06-13	Australia	4
G	1	(Croatia)	Mühl, Nika	6' 0" (1.83m)	156 lb (71kg)	2001-04-09	Connecticut	R
F	3	(United States)	Ogwumike, Nneka	6' 2" (1.88m)	174 lb (79kg)	1990-07-02	Stanford	12
C	21	(United States)	Russell, Mercedes	6' 6" (1.98m)	195 lb (88kg)	1995-07-27	Tennessee	6
G	35	(United States)	Vivians, Victoria	6' 1" (1.85m)	183 lb (83kg)	1994-11-17	Mississippi State	5
G	32	(Australia)	Whitcomb, Sami	5' 10" (1.78m)	154 lb (70kg)	1988-07-20	Washington	7
F	5	(France)	Williams, Gabby	5' 11" (1.8m)	172 lb (78kg)	1996-09-09	Connecticut	5
F	–	(United States)	Holmes, Mackenzie (injured) (DP)	6' 3" (1.91m)		2000-11-01	Indiana	R

Head coach
(Bulgaria) Noelle Quinn (UCLA)
Assistant coaches
(United States) Pokey Chatman (LSU)
(United States) Ebony Hoffman (USC)
(United States) Perry Huang (Fresno Pacific)
Athletic trainer
Brittanie Vaughn

Legend

- (C) Team captain
- (DP) Unsigned draft pick
- (FA) Free agent
- (S) Suspended
- Injured

=== Depth ===
Pos.	Starter	Bench
PG	Skylar Diggins-Smith	Nika Mühl
SG	Jewell Loyd	Sami Whitcomb; Victoria Vivians
SF	Gabby Williams	Jordan Horston
PF	Nneka Ogwumike	Joyner Holmes
C	Ezi Magbegor	Mercedes Russell

== Schedule ==
The Storm started the season slowly, losing back-to-back games against Minnesota with the second coming in Minnesota in double overtime. They lost to New York as well, but won the remainder of their games in May. They recorded two wins over Washington and Indiana during that run to finish May 5–3. The Storm extended their winning streak to six games by defeating Phoenix and Las Vegas to begin July. Their third loss of the season to Minnesota broke the streak. They won two games before losing to Phoenix and Las Vegas. The Storm finished July by winning three straight games to finish July 7–3. They defeated Dallas to begin July before losing to Chicago. They would defeat Chicago two days later and win three out of their remaining four games before the Olympic break. The loss came to Las Vegas and the Storm finished July 5–2. They headed into the Olympic break 17–8. The Storm experienced a bit of a hangover coming out of the Olympic break as they lost their first two games. They split a double header with Washington and defeated Atlanta before losing to New York to end August. They ended August 2–4. However, their overall record of 19–12 saw them clinch a playoff berth on August 30. The Storm opened September with two games in Connecticut, which they split. They would lose for a third time this season to New York before winning five of their last six games. Two of the five wins came against Phoenix and another two came against Los Angeles. The Storm finished 25–15, and in fifth place overall.

=== Pre-season ===
2024 pre-season game log
Total: 1–1 (Home: 1–1; Road: 0–0)
May: 1–1 (Home: 1–1; Road: 0–0)

Game	Date	Team	Score	High points	High rebounds	High assists	Location Attendance	Record
1	May 5	vs. Los Angeles	L 79–84	Skylar Diggins-Smith (14)	Davis; Diggins-Smith (4)	Skylar Diggins-Smith (5)	Rogers Place; 16,655	0–1
2	May 7	Phoenix	W 85–59	Jewell Loyd (18)	Jordan Horston (9)	Skylar Diggins-Smith (5)	Climate Pledge Arena	1–1

2024 pre-season schedule

=== Regular season ===
2024 game log
Total: 25–15 (Home: 14–6; Road: 11–9)
May: 5–3 (Home: 2–1; Road: 3–2)

Game	Date	Team	Score	High points	High rebounds	High assists	Location Attendance	Record
1	May 14	Minnesota	L 70–83	Nneka Ogwumike (20)	Jewell Loyd (10)	Skylar Diggins-Smith (6)	Climate Pledge Arena; 8,508	0–1
2	May 17	@ Minnesota	L 93–102 (2OT)	Nneka Ogwumike (24)	Horston, Ogwumike (11)	Jewell Loyd (6)	Target Center; 7,208	0–2
3	May 19	@ Washington	W 84–75	Jewell Loyd (24)	Ezi Magbegor (14)	Skylar Diggins-Smith (5)	Entertainment and Sports Arena; 4,200	1–2
4	May 20	@ New York	L 63–74	Jewell Loyd (13)	Jewell Loyd (9)	Skylar Diggins-Smith (7)	Barclays Center; 9,381	1–3
5	May 22	Indiana	W 85–83	Jewell Loyd (32)	Jewell Loyd (11)	Jewell Loyd (6)	Climate Pledge Arena; 18,343	2–3
6	May 25	Washington	W 101–69	Nneka Ogwumike (19)	Mercedes Russell (7)	Skylar Diggins-Smith (9)	Climate Pledge Arena; 8,846	3–3
7	May 28	@ Chicago	W 77–68	Skylar Diggins-Smith (21)	Ezi Magbegor (12)	Jewell Loyd (6)	Wintrust Arena; 7,807	4–3
8	May 30	@ Indiana	W 103–88	Jewell Loyd (22)	Ezi Magbegor (8)	Skylar Diggins-Smith (9)	Gainbridge Fieldhouse; 15,022	5–3

June : 7–3 (Home: 5–0; Road: 2–3)

Game	Date	Team	Score	High points	High rebounds	High assists	Location Attendance	Record
9	June 4	Phoenix	W 80–62	Ezi Magbegor (21)	Ezi Magbegor (9)	Jewell Loyd (6)	Climate Pledge Arena; 8,133	6–3
10	June 7	@ Las Vegas	W 78–65	Jewell Loyd (25)	Ezi Magbegor (15)	Skylar Diggins-Smith (7)	Michelob Ultra Arena; 10,380	7–3
11	June 9	@ Minnesota	L 64–83	Jewell Loyd (25)	Loyd, Magbegor (7)	Diggins-Smith, Loyd, Ogwumike (3)	Target Center; 7,121	7–4
12	June 11	Los Angeles	W 95–79	Nneka Ogwumike (26)	Ezi Magbegor (13)	Skylar Diggins-Smith (6)	Climate Pledge Arena; 8,202	8–4
13	June 13	@ Dallas	W 92–84	Skylar Diggins-Smith (21)	Ezi Magbegor (10)	Diggins-Smith, Loyd (6)	College Park Center; 5,568	9–4
14	June 16	@ Phoenix	L 78–87	Nneka Ogwumike (15)	Nneka Ogwumike (11)	Skylar Diggins-Smith (8)	Footprint Center; 9,444	9–5
15	June 19	@ Las Vegas	L 83–94	Nneka Ogwumike (21)	Ezi Magbegor (13)	Skylar Diggins-Smith (6)	Michelob Ultra Arena; 10,380	9–6
16	June 23	Connecticut	W 72–61	Jewell Loyd (16)	Ezi Magbegor (9)	Skylar Diggins-Smith (8)	Climate Pledge Arena; 9,935	10–6
17	June 27	Indiana	W 89–77	Jewell Loyd (34)	Nneka Ogwumike (11)	Skylar Diggins-Smith (9)	Climate Pledge Arena; 18,343	11–6
18	June 29	Dallas	W 97–76	Jewell Loyd (30)	Jordan Horston (11)	Diggins-Smith, Loyd, Ogwumike (5)	Climate Pledge Arena; 9,080	12–6

July : 5–2 (Home: 4–2; Road: 1–0)

Game	Date	Team	Score	High points	High rebounds	High assists	Location Attendance	Record
19	July 1	Dallas	W 95–71	Jewell Loyd (26)	Ezi Magbegor (7)	Skylar Diggins-Smith (5)	Climate Pledge Arena; 7,202	13–6
20	July 5	Chicago	L 84–88	Jordan Horston (20)	Ezi Magbegor (8)	Skylar Diggins-Smith (9)	Climate Pledge Arena; 10,725	13–7
21	July 7	Chicago	W 84–71	Nneka Ogwumike (24)	Ogwumike, Magbegor (13)	Skylar Diggins-Smith (8)	Climate Pledge Arena; 11,283	14–7
22	July 10	Las Vegas	L 79–84	Jewell Loyd (28)	Ezi Magbegor (10)	Skylar Diggins-Smith (8)	Climate Pledge Arena; 12,500	14–8
23	July 12	Minnesota	W 91–63	Nneka Ogwumike (26)	Magbegor, Vivians (8)	Skylar Diggins-Smith (12)	Climate Pledge Arena; 8,320	15–8
24	July 14	Atlanta	W 81–70	Ezi Magbegor (18)	Nneka Ogwumike (12)	Jewell Loyd (7)	Climate Pledge Arena; 10,036	16–8
25	July 16	@ Los Angeles	W 89–83	Jewell Loyd (30)	Nneka Ogwumike (10)	Jewell Loyd (7)	Crypto.com Arena; 18,724	17–8

August : 2–4 (Home: 1–2; Road: 1–2)

Game	Date	Team	Score	High points	High rebounds	High assists	Location Attendance	Record
26	August 16	@ Atlanta	L 81–83	Skylar Diggins-Smith (29)	Ezi Magbegor (7)	Skylar Diggins-Smith (5)	Gateway Center Arena; 3,260	17–9
27	August 18	@ Indiana	L 75–92	Jewell Loyd (26)	Nneka Ogwumike (9)	Skylar Diggins-Smith (5)	Gainbridge Fieldhouse; 17,274	17–10
28	August 20	@ Washington	W 83–77	Nneka Ogwumike (24)	Ezi Magbegor (14)	Skylar Diggins-Smith (5)	Entertainment and Sports Arena; 4,200	18–10
29	August 26	Washington	L 72–74	Jewell Loyd (16)	Nneka Ogwumike (10)	Skylar Diggins-Smith (8)	Climate Pledge Arena; 9,535	18–11
30	August 28	Atlanta	W 85–81	Jewell Loyd (28)	Ezi Magbegor (9)	Skylar Diggins-Smith (9)	Climate Pledge Arena; 9,228	19–11
31	August 30	New York	L 85–98	Skylar Diggins-Smith (26)	Nneka Ogwumike (8)	Skylar Diggins-Smith (7)	Climate Pledge Arena; 15,800	19–12

September : 6–3 (Home: 2–1; Road: 4–2)

Game	Date	Team	Score	High points	High rebounds	High assists	Location Attendance	Record
32	September 1	@ Connecticut	L 86–93	Jewell Loyd (27)	Nneka Ogwumike (11)	Diggins-Smith, Whitcomb (6)	Mohegan Sun Arena; 8,910	19–13
33	September 3	@ Connecticut	W 71–64	Skylar Diggins-Smith (18)	Ogwumike, Williams (6)	Gabby Williams (5)	Mohegan Sun Arena; 7,454	20–13
34	September 5	@ New York	L 70–77	Skylar Diggins-Smith (21)	Ezi Magbegor (7)	Skylar Diggins-Smith (6)	Barclays Center; 10,873	20–14
35	September 7	Phoenix	W 90–66	Jewell Loyd (20)	Ogwumike, Russell (8)	Skylar Diggins-Smith (11)	Climate Pledge Arena; 14,066	21–14
36	September 11	@ Los Angeles	W 90–82	Skylar Diggins-Smith (26)	Magbegor, Ogwumike (8)	Diggins-Smith, Loyd (5)	Crypto.com Arena; 9,561	22–14
37	September 13	@ Dallas	W 83–81	Skylar Diggins-Smith (21)	Gabby Williams (7)	Jewel Loyd (6)	College Park Center; 5,728	23–14
38	September 15	Los Angeles	W 90–87	Nneka Ogwumike (23)	Nneka Ogwumike (7)	Skylar Diggins-Smith (6)	Climate Pledge Arena; 11,301	24–14
39	September 17	Las Vegas	L 72–85	Nneka Ogwumike (19)	Horston, Ogwumike (6)	Skylar Diggins-Smith (9)	Climate Pledge Arena; 14,298	24–15
40	September 19	@ Phoenix	W 89–70	Nneka Ogwumike (17)	Joyner Holmes (10)	Diggins-Smith, Williams (6)	Footprint Center; 11,333	25–15

2024 season schedule

=== Playoffs ===
2024 playoff game log
First round vs. Las Vegas Aces
Lost Series: 0–2

Game	Date	Team	Score	High points	High rebounds	High assists	Location Attendance	Series
1	September 22	@ Las Vegas	L 67–78	Skylar Diggins-Smith (16)	Mercedes Russell (12)	Skylar Diggins-Smith (8)	Michelob Ultra Arena; 10,369	0–1
2	September 24	@ Las Vegas	L 73–86	Gabby Williams (20)	Nneka Ogwumike (10)	Skylar Diggins-Smith (10)	Michelob Ultra Arena; 10,370	0–2

2024 playoff schedule

== Standings ==
#	Team	W	L	PCT	GB	Conf.	Home	Road	Cup
1	yx – New York Liberty	32	8	.800	—	16–4	16–4	16–4	5–0
2	cx – Minnesota Lynx	30	10	.750	2	14–6	16–4	14–6	4–1
3	x – Connecticut Sun	28	12	.700	4	14–6	14–6	14–6	4–1
4	x – Las Vegas Aces	27	13	.675	5	12–8	13–7	14–6	2–3
5	x – Seattle Storm	25	15	.625	7	13–7	14–6	11–9	4–1
6	x – Indiana Fever	20	20	.500	12	11–9	12–8	8–12	3–2
7	x – Phoenix Mercury	19	21	.475	13	10–10	10–10	9–11	3–2
8	x – Atlanta Dream	15	25	.375	17	7–13	8–12	7–13	1–4
9	e – Washington Mystics	14	26	.350	18	7–13	5–15	9–11	1–4
10	e – Chicago Sky	13	27	.325	19	5–15	6–14	7–13	1–4
11	e – Dallas Wings	9	31	.225	23	6–14	7–13	2–18	0–5
12	e – Los Angeles Sparks	8	32	.200	24	5–15	5–15	3–17	2–3

Notes

(#) – League Standing
c – Commissioner's Cup winners
y – Regular Season Champion
x – Clinched playoff berth
e – Eliminated from playoff contention
Source: Overall standings and Commissioner's Cup Standings

== Playoffs ==
**First round** Best-of-3
**1**	**New York Liberty**	**2**
8	Atlanta Dream	0
**4**	**Las Vegas Aces**	**2**
5	Seattle Storm	0
2	**Minnesota Lynx**	**2**
7	Phoenix Mercury	0
3	**Connecticut Sun**	**2**
6	Indiana Fever	0

**Semifinals**; Best-of-5
1	**New York Liberty**	**3**
4	Las Vegas Aces	1
2	**Minnesota Lynx**	**3**
3	Connecticut Sun	2

**Finals**; Best-of-5
1	**New York Liberty**	**3**
2	Minnesota Lynx	2

- **Bold** – Series winner
- Italic – Team with home-court-advantage

== Statistics ==
Legend
GP	Games played	GS	Games started	MPG	Minutes per game	RPG	Rebounds per game
APG	Assists per game	SPG	Steals per game	BPG	Blocks per game	PPG	Points per game
FG%	Field-goal percentage	3P%	3-point field-goal percentage	FT%	Free-throw percentage	TO	Turnovers per game
PF	Fouls per game		Team leader		League leader

=== Regular season ===
Player	GP	GS	MPG	FG%	3P%	FT%	RPG	APG	SPG	BPG	TO	PF	PPG
Jewell Loyd	37	37	33.7	.360	.274	.881	4.5	3.6	1.4	0.2	2.3	1.8	19.7
Nneka Ogwumike	37	37	31.8	.511	.405	.876	7.6	2.3	1.9	0.5	1.4	2.3	16.7
Skylar Diggins-Smith	40	40	31.6	.427	.291	.867	2.6	6.4	1.7	0.9	2.8	2.8	15.1
Ezi Magbegor	37	37	30.7	.512	.245	.874	8.0	2.0	1.1	2.2	1.4	3.2	11.7
Gabby Williams ^{≠}	12	11	29.0	.481	.323	.737	4.0	3.7	1.7	0.3	1.4	1.8	10.3
Jordan Horston	39	14	22.3	.493	.250	.721	4.3	1.8	1.3	0.7	1.7	1.9	6.8
Sami Whitcomb	40	3	15.3	.346	.292	.818	1.9	1.6	0.8	0.2	1.0	1.4	5.0
Mercedes Russell	37	6	15.7	.517	—	.636	3.0	0.8	0.6	0.2	0.7	1.2	3.9
Victoria Vivians	35	15	12.8	.333	.319	.667	2.0	0.8	0.4	0.2	0.6	1.2	3.1
Joyner Holmes ^{≠}	27	0	8.6	.423	.194	.636	1.8	0.9	0.2	0.2	0.8	1.0	2.9
Dulcy Fankam Mendjiadeu ^{‡}	7	0	5.1	.667	—	.333	1.3	0.1	0.0	0.0	0.4	0.7	0.9
Kiana Williams ^{‡} ^{≠} ^{‡}	13	0	3.5	.250	.333	—	0.2	0.4	0.0	0.0	0.2	0.2	0.8
Nika Mühl	16	0	3.6	.071	.000	—	0.6	0.4	0.1	0.0	0.3	0.6	0.1

^{‡}Waived/Released during the season
^{†}Traded during the season
^{≠}Acquired during the season

=== Playoffs ===
Player	GP	GS	MPG	FG%	3P%	FT%	RPG	APG	SPG	BPG	TO	PF	PPG
Gabby Williams	2	2	37.0	.452	.333	1.000	6.5	2.5	0.5	0.5	2.0	2.0	17.0
Nneka Ogwumike	2	2	37.0	.324	.222	1.000	10.0	2.0	3.0	0.5	0.5	1.0	14.5
Skylar Diggins-Smith	2	2	36.0	.313	.300	1.000	2.0	9.0	2.0	1.5	2.0	3.0	14.5
Ezi Magbegor	1	1	28.0	.600	.667	.000	7.0	2.0	0.0	0.0	0.0	4.0	14.0
Jewell Loyd	2	2	29.5	.263	.333	.750	3.5	2.0	0.5	0.0	0.0	2.0	7.5
Jordan Horston	2	0	17.5	.571	.000	1.000	2.5	0.0	1.5	1.0	1.0	1.0	6.0
Mercedes Russell	2	1	23.0	.500	—	1.000	7.0	0.0	0.5	0.0	2.5	0.0	5.0
Victoria Vivians	1	0	7.0	.000	—	—	0.0	0.0	0.0	0.0	0.0	0.0	0.0
Joyner Holmes	1	0	2.0	—	—	—	0.0	0.0	0.0	0.0	0.0	0.0	0.0
Sami Whitcomb	1	0	2.0	.000	—	—	0.0	0.0	0.0	0.0	1.0	1.0	0.0

== Awards and honors ==
Recipient	Award	Date awarded	Ref.
Skylar Diggins-Smith	AP Comeback Player of the Year	September 22, 2024	
Jewell Loyd	WNBA All-Star	July 2, 2024	
Ezi Magbegor	WNBA All-Defensive First Team	September 29, 2024	
Nneka Ogwumike	WNBA All-Star	July 2, 2024	
Nneka Ogwumike	AP All-WNBA Second Team	September 22, 2024	
Nneka Ogwumike	WNBA All-Defensive Second Team	September 29, 2024	
Nneka Ogwumike	All-WNBA Second Team	October 16, 2024	
