= Jordan Horston =

American basketball player (born 2001)

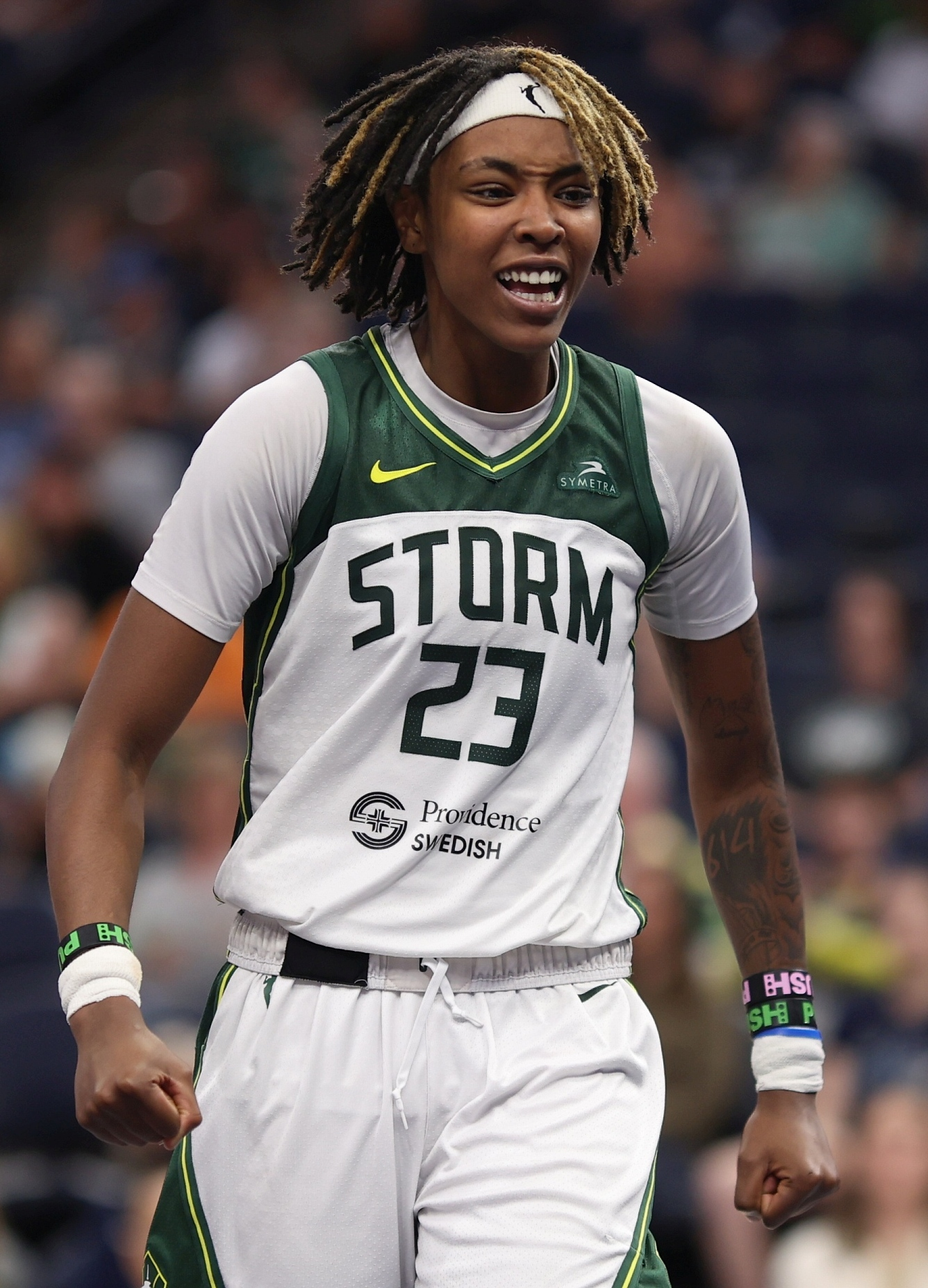
- Horston with the Seattle Storm in 2023

No. 23 – Seattle Storm
- Position: Point guard / shooting guard
- League: WNBA

Personal information
- Born: May 21, 2001 (age 25) Dallas, Texas, U.S.
- Listed height: 6 ft 2 in (1.88 m)
- Listed weight: 165 lb (75 kg)

Career information
- High school: Columbus Africentric (Columbus, Ohio)
- College: Tennessee (2019–2023)
- WNBA draft: 2023: 1st round, 9th overall pick
- Drafted by: Seattle Storm
- Playing career: 2023–present

Career history
- 2023–present: Seattle Storm
- 2024: Tokomanawa Queens

Career highlights
- WNBA All-Rookie Team (2023); SEC All-Freshman Team (2020); 2× First-team All-SEC (2022, 2023); McDonald's All-American MVP (2019); FIBA Under-17 Women's World Cup MVP (2018)
- Stats at Basketball Reference
Medals
Women's basketball
Representing United States
FIBA Under-17 World Cup
| Gold medal – first place | 2018 Belarus | Team |
FIBA Americas Under-16 Championship
| Gold medal – first place | 2017 Argentina | Team |

Jordan Lynn Horston (born May 21, 2001) is an American basketball player for the Seattle Storm of the WNBA. She played college basketball for the Tennessee Lady Volunteers of the Southeastern Conference. Horston was selected 9th overall by the Storm in the 2023 WNBA draft.

== Early life ==
Horston attended Columbus Africentric High School in Ohio, where she played four varsity seasons.

As a high school senior, she helped her team win their second straight state title, despite suffering from a 102 °F (39 °C) fever the previous night. Despite having an off shooting night (3-for-20 from the field), she put up 10 rebounds and 6 assists and wore a surgical mask when on the bench to contain her cough.

The no. 2 overall prospect and the top guard in the country, Horston committed to playing college basketball at Tennessee. She was also a participant in the McDonald's All-American Game, where she put up 14 points and was named the game's MVP.

== College career ==
=== Freshman season ===
Initially committing Tennessee to play for Holly Warlick, Horston learned of Warlick's firing while at the McDonald's All-American Game. Playing for Kellie Harper, she was named to the SEC All Academic team and SEC All-Freshman Team after averaging 10.1 points and 4.6 assists per game, leading the Lady Volunteers in assists and steals. She had the game-winner against Auburn on March 1, hitting a running with 0.6 seconds remaining.

CAREER HIGHLIGHTS

Finished her career with 1,445 points, 731 rebounds, 455 assists, 163 steals and 109 blocks while starting 91 of 114 games. Tallied the No. 29 all-time point total by a Lady Vol and is one of only two players to record 1,000 points, 700 rebounds and 400 assists during a career. Alexis Hornbuckle (2004–08) is the other, tallying 1,333, 740 and 503, respectively. Stands No. 1 among all true guards at Tennessee with 21 career double-doubles, including eight in 2022–23. Finished No. 7 at Tennessee in both career assists (455) and career assist average (3.99).

Ranks No. 8 in career 20-plus point scoring efforts with 17. Joined Dawn Marsh (1984–88) as the only UT players to lead the program in assist average all four years of their careers. Averaged 9.39 rebounds in 2021–22, a mark that ranks No. 6 all-time by a Lady Vol and No. 3 by a Tennessee junior. Helped Tennessee make three NCAA Tournament appearances.

https://utsports.com/sports/womens-basketball/roster/jordan-horston/17607

== Professional career ==
=== WNBA ===
==== Seattle Storm (2023–present) ====
Horston was selected 9th overall by the Seattle Storm in the 2023 WNBA draft. In her rookie season, Horston played in 36 games, starting 17, and averaged 22.4 minutes, 6.9 points, 5.1 rebounds, 1.6 assists, and 1.2 steals per game. Horston was named to the 2023 WNBA All-Rookie Team.

Horston began her second season with the Storm on the bench, as Seattle signed star free agents Skylar Diggins-Smith and Nneka Ogwumike. Eventually, she earned a starting spot at the end of June. However, she was later replaced by mid-season signing Gabby Williams. Nonetheless, Horston played virtually the same minutes as in her rookie season and improved in several statistical categories. Overall, she played in 39 games, starting 14, and averaged 22.3 minutes, 6.8 points, 4.3 rebounds, 1.8 assists, and 1.3 steals per game. She also achieved one of the best improvements in shooting percentage in WNBA history, shooting 49.3 % from the floor in her second season compared to 36.7 % in her rookie season.

In February 2025, Horston suffered an ACL injury while playing in the 2025 season of Athletes Unlimited Pro Basketball. On April 18, the Storm confirmed Horston would miss the entire 2025 WNBA season due to the injury.

=== New Zealand ===
From October to December 2024, Horston played for the Tokomanawa Queens of the Tauihi Basketball Aotearoa.

== National team career ==
Horston represented the United States at the FIBA U17 Women's World Cup and FIBA Americas U16 Women's Championship, winning the most valuable player award at the World Cup.

== Career statistics ==
Legend
| GP | Games played | GS | Games started | MPG | Minutes per game | RPG | Rebounds per game |
| APG | Assists per game | SPG | Steals per game | BPG | Blocks per game | PPG | Points per game |
| TO | Turnovers per game | FG% | Field-goal percentage | 3P% | 3-point field-goal percentage | FT% | Free-throw percentage |
| **Bold** | Career best | ° | League leader |

=== WNBA ===
==== Regular season ====
WNBA regular season statistics
| Year | Team | GP | GS | MPG | FG% | 3P% | FT% | RPG | APG | SPG | BPG | TO | PPG |
|---|---|---|---|---|---|---|---|---|---|---|---|---|---|
| 2023 | Seattle | 36 | 17 | **22.4** | .367 | .244 | .712 | **5.1** | 1.6 | 1.2 | 0.6 | 2.0 | **6.9** |
| 2024 | Seattle | **39** | 14 | 22.3 | **.493** | **.250** | **.721** | 4.3 | **1.8** | **1.3** | **0.7** | 1.7 | 6.8 |
| 2025 | Did not play (injury) | | | | | | | | | | | | |
| 2026 | Seattle | 37 | **23** | 17.5 | .362 | .213 | .676 | 3.5 | 1.3 | 1.0 | 0.5 | **1.2** | 4.5 |
| **Career** | 3 years, 1 team | 112 | 54 | 20.8 | .408 | .234 | .705 | 4.3 | 1.6 | 1.2 | 0.6 | 1.8 | 6.1 |

==== Playoffs ====
WNBA playoff statistics
| Year | Team | GP | GS | MPG | FG% | 3P% | FT% | RPG | APG | SPG | BPG | TO | PPG |
|---|---|---|---|---|---|---|---|---|---|---|---|---|---|
| 2024 | Seattle | 2 | 0 | 17.5 | .571 | .000 | 1.000 | 2.5 | 0.0 | 1.5 | 1.0 | 1.0 | 6.0 |
| **Career** | 1 year, 1 team | 2 | 0 | 17.5 | .571 | .000 | 1.000 | 2.5 | 0.0 | 1.5 | 1.0 | 1.0 | 6.0 |

=== College ===
NCAA statistics
| Year | Team | GP | GS | MPG | FG% | 3P% | FT% | RPG | APG | SPG | BPG | TO | PPG |
|---|---|---|---|---|---|---|---|---|---|---|---|---|---|
| 2019–20 | Tennessee | 31 | 22 | 26.4 | .394 | **.300** | .593 | 5.5 | **4.6** | 1.3 | 0.8 | 4.3 | 10.1 |
| 2020–21 | Tennessee | 25 | 13 | 27.0 | .350 | .280 | .729 | 3.9 | 4.2 | 1.4 | 0.9 | 2.7 | 8.6 |
| 2021–22 | Tennessee | 23 | 23 | **29.3** | .379 | .276 | .729 | **9.4** | 4.0 | 1.4 | 1.0 | **4.5** | **16.2** |
| 2022–23 | Tennessee | **35** | **33** | 26.8 | **.438** | .278 | **.739** | 7.1 | 3.3 | **1.6** | **1.1** | 3.0 | 15.6 |
| **Career** | | 114 | 91 | 27.3 | .398 | .285 | .693 | 6.4 | 4.0 | 1.4 | 1.0 | 3.6 | 12.7 |

== Personal life ==
Horston is the daughter of Leigh and Malika Horston and has one sister. She is an advocate for mental health.

Horston advocates for LGBTQ+ inclusiveness in college sports.
