= 2023 WNBA season =

- League: Women's National Basketball Association
- Sport: Basketball
- Duration: May 19 – October 18, 2023
- Games: 40
- Teams: 12
- Total attendance: 1,585,824
- Average attendance: 6,608
- TV partner(s): ABC, ESPN, ESPN2, ESPN+, CBS, CBSSN, NBA TV, ION Television, Prime Video

Draft
- Top draft pick: (United States) Aliyah Boston
- Picked by: Indiana Fever

Regular season
- Top seed: Las Vegas Aces
- Season MVP: (United States) Breanna Stewart (New York)
- Top scorer: (United States) Jewell Loyd (Seattle)

Playoffs
- Finals champions: Las Vegas Aces (2nd title)
- Runners-up: New York Liberty
- Finals MVP: (United States) A'ja Wilson (Las Vegas)

WNBA seasons
- ← 2022 2024 →

The 2023 WNBA season was the 27th season of the Women's National Basketball Association (WNBA). The defending champions, the Las Vegas Aces, repeated as champions after defeating the New York Liberty 3 games to 1 in the Finals.

The regular season was expanded to 40 games per team, becoming the most games scheduled in a single WNBA season. The 2022 season saw the schedule increase to 36 games and was the previous high for the regular season. This season was also the second straight year that the playoffs used an all-series format after returning to the format in 2022. The first round used a 2–1 format, with the higher seed hosting the first two games (differing from the 1–1–1 format previously used in 2015). The semifinals and the WNBA Finals remained a best-of-five series.

Arguably the most significant change to the league this season was the enforcement of the so-called "prioritization clause" in the collective bargaining agreement between the league and its players' union. For this season, players with more than two seasons of prior WNBA service who did not report to their teams by the designated start of training camp or May 1, whichever is later, faced mandatory fines. Those who missed the start of the regular season were suspended for the season. From 2024 on, those who miss the start of training camp will be suspended for the season.

== Draft ==
The Indiana Fever won the first pick in the 2023 WNBA draft in the draft lottery. This was the first time in Indiana's franchise history that they won the first pick. They were followed by the Minnesota Lynx for second, Atlanta Dream for third, and the Washington Mystics for fourth. The Mystics received the fourth pick in the lottery after trading for the Los Angeles Sparks' pick during the 2022 season. The Dream had originally held the Sparks' pick, but traded it to the Mystics prior to the 2022 WNBA draft, when they acquired the first overall pick.

=== Lottery picks ===
Pick	Player	Nationality	Team	School / club team
1	Aliyah Boston	United States	Indiana Fever	South Carolina
2	Diamond Miller	United States	Minnesota Lynx	Maryland
3	Maddy Siegrist	United States	Dallas Wings (from Atlanta) (Note: January 21, 2023: Atlanta to Dallas: Atlanta acquired Allisha Gray; Dallas acquired 2023 and 2025 first-round picks)	Villanova
4	Stephanie Soares	Brazil	Washington Mystics (from Los Angeles via Atlanta) (Note: February 5, 2022: Los Angeles to Atlanta: Atlanta acquired Erica Wheeler, a 2022 second-round pick, and a 2023 first-round pick; Los Angeles acquired Chennedy Carter and the rights to Li Yueru) (Note: April 6, 2022: Atlanta to Washington: Atlanta acquired a 2022 first-round pick (1st overall) and a 2023 first-round pick; Washington acquired a 2022 first-round pick (3rd overall), 2022 second-round pick (14th overall), and option to swap its own 2023 first-round pick with the 2023 first-round pick Atlanta acquired from Los Angeles)	Iowa State

== Media coverage ==
In March 2023, the WNBA announced that they and ESPN would show up to 52 possible games throughout the regular season and playoffs. The first broadcast happened on May 19, 2023, when the Phoenix Mercury visit the Los Angeles Sparks on ESPN.

As far as the United States' WNBA television schedule, it showed 10 broadcasts on ABC including the 2023 WNBA All-Star Game, 10 on ESPN, and 5 on ESPN2. The All-Star Game was aired in primetime for the first time ever, as well.

WNBA Countdown is now available throughout the regular season with at least 10 editions immediately preceding game broadcasts.

On April 20, 2023, Ion Television signed on as a multi-year broadcast partner, with a doubleheader that includes nationally televised games and regional games on Friday nights. Their first broadcast was May 26, 2023, when the Washington Mystics visited the Chicago Sky.

== Transactions ==
=== Retirement ===
- Sue Bird publicly confirmed on June 16, 2022, that she would retire from playing professional basketball after the 2022 WNBA season. Her career ended on September 7, 2022, with the Storm's playoff loss to the Las Vegas Aces. Over her twenty-year career she won the WNBA Finals four times (2004, 2010, 2018, 2020). She was a thirteen-time WNBA All-Star, and named to the All-WNBA Team eight times, with five being first-team selections and three being second-team selections. At the time of her retirement Bird was the career leader in the WNBA in assists, and had also played in more games than any other WNBA player.
- During the 2022 season, Sylvia Fowles announced that she would retire at the end of the season. Over her fifteen-year career, she won the WNBA Finals twice (2015 & 2017) and was named Finals MVP in both victories. She was regular season MVP in 2017. She was an eight-time WNBA All-Star, and named to the All-WNBA Team eight times with three being first-team selections and five being second-team selections. Her eight All-WBA appearances are tied for fifth all-time at the time of her retirement. Fowles was the Defensive Player of the Year four times and named to the WNBA All-Defensive Team in eleven of her fifteen seasons. At the time of her retirement, she was the career leader in the WNBA in rebounds.
- Briann January returned to her home state of Washington for her final season in 2022, signing with the Seattle Storm for her final year during the free agency period. She stated, "I'm so excited to have the opportunity to come back to my home state for my final season in the W." January retired with one WNBA Championship in 2012, was a five-time WNBA All-Defensive First Team member and a two-time WNBA All-Defensive Second Team member. She was also an All-Star in 2014.
- On January 16, 2023, Maya Moore announced that she was officially retiring from basketball. Moore had not played since the 2018 season and had taken time off to focus on other initiatives. Over her eight-year career, she won the WNBA Finals four times (2011, 2013, 2015, 2017) and was named the Finals MVP in 2013. She was regular season MVP in 2014 and Rookie of the Year in 2011. She was a six-time WNBA All-Star, and named to the All-WNBA Team seven times with five being first-team selections and two being second-team selections. She was also named All-Star Game MVP three times, in 2015, 2017, and 2018.
- On August 14, 2022, Kia Vaughn announced her retirement. Over her thirteen-year WNBA career she played for five different WNBA teams and was named the most improved player in 2011.

=== Free agency ===
The free agency negotiation period began on January 21, 2023, and teams were able to officially sign players starting February 1.

=== Coaching changes ===
Off-season
Team	2022 season	2023 season	Reference
Los Angeles Sparks	Fred Williams (interim)	Curt Miller	
Indiana Fever	Carlos Knox (interim)	Christie Sides	
Dallas Wings	Vickie Johnson	Latricia Trammell	
Connecticut Sun	Curt Miller	Stephanie White	
Washington Mystics	Mike Thibault	Eric Thibault	
Mid-season
Team	Departing Coach	New Coach	Reference
Phoenix Mercury	Vanessa Nygaard	Nikki Blue	
Chicago Sky	James Wade	Emre Vatansever	

== Regular season ==
=== All-Star Game ===
ABC, TSN4/SN360

July 15, 2023
8:30 p.m. ET

Report

Team Wilson 127, Team Stewart 143
Scoring by quarter: 27–29, 36–44, 30–37, 34–33
Pts: Kelsey Plum (30); Rebs: Aliyah Boston (11); Asts: Chelsea Gray (7)	Pts: Jewell Loyd (31); Rebs: Brittney Griner (13); Asts: Breanna Stewart (9)

Michelob Ultra Arena, Las Vegas, Nevada
Attendance: 9,472
Referees: Eric Brewton
Ashley Gloss
Randy Richardson

=== Standings ===
#	Team	W	L	PCT	GB	Conf.	Home	Road	Cup
1	x – Las Vegas Aces	34	6	.850	–	18–2	19–1	15–5	9–1
2	x – New York Liberty	32	8	.800	2	16–4	15–5	17–3	7–3
3	x – Connecticut Sun	27	13	.675	7	14–6	13–7	14–6	7–3
4	x – Dallas Wings	22	18	.550	12	11–9	11–9	11–9	6–4
5	x – Atlanta Dream	19	21	.475	15	11–9	11–9	8–12	6–4
6	x – Minnesota Lynx	19	21	.475	15	12–8	9–11	10–10	5–5
7	x – Washington Mystics	19	21	.475	15	9–11	12–8	7–13	5–5
8	x – Chicago Sky	18	22	.450	16	5–15	7–13	11–9	3–7
9	e – Los Angeles Sparks	17	23	.425	17	9–11	10–10	7–13	5–5
10	e – Indiana Fever	13	27	.325	21	5–15	6–14	7–13	2–8
11	e – Seattle Storm	11	29	.275	23	8–12	4–16	7–13	4–6
12	e – Phoenix Mercury	9	31	.225	25	2–18	8–12	1–19	1–9

Notes

(#) – League Standing
x – Clinched playoff berth
e – Eliminated from postseason contention
Source: Overall standings and Commissioner's Cup Standings

=== Schedule ===
2023 WNBA preseason
Preseason

Date	Time (ET)	Matchup			TV	Result	High points	High rebounds	High assists	Location
Monday, April 10	7:00 p.m.	2023 WNBA draft			USA: ESPN; Canada: TSN3/5					New York
Friday, May 5	8:00 p.m.	Washington	@	Minnesota		69–72	D. Miller (19)	Juhász (10)	Cloud (7)	Target Center; 5,001
Friday, May 5	8:00 p.m.	Chicago	@	Dallas		70–75	McCowan (17)	Tied (8)	Burton (4)	College Park Center; 2,004
Sunday, May 7	6:00 p.m.	Indiana	@	Chicago		56–81	I. Harrison (15)	Gardner (5)	C. Williams (4)	Wintrust Arena; 2,024
Monday, May 8	10:00 p.m.	Phoenix	@	Seattle		77–71	Sutton (11)	Mendjiadeu (9)	Sissoko (4)	Climate Pledge Arena; 5,119
Wednesday, May 10	11:00 a.m.	New York	@	Connecticut		57–63	Tied (10)	Thornton (8)	A. Thomas (5)	Mohegan Sun Arena; N/A
Wednesday, May 10	11:30 a.m.	Atlanta	@	Washingtion		76–88	Delle Donne (17)	Hawkins (10)	H. Jones (6)	Entertainment and Sports Arena; 3,612
Friday, May 12	10:00 p.m.	Los Angeles	@	Phoenix		90–71	Tied (13)	Gustafson (6)	3 tied (5)	Footprint Center; N/A
Saturday, May 13	1:00 p.m.	Dallas	@	Indiana		83–90	K. Mitchell (29)	Tied (9)	E. Wheeler (5)	Gainbridge Fieldhouse; 2,084
Saturday, May 13	4:00 p.m.	Chicago	vs	Minnesota	USA: League Pass; Canada: TSN1/4/5 (TSN3 JIP at 6:00 p.m.), SN360	82–74	T. Mitchell (19)	Copper (9)	T. Mitchell (6)	Scotiabank Arena; 19,800
Saturday, May 13	5:00 p.m.	New York	@	Las Vegas		77–84	Plum (22)	C. Gray (8)	Stewart (5)	Michelob Ultra Arena; 4,460
Sunday, May 14	3:00 p.m.	Connecticut	@	Atlanta		85–68	Hayes (20)	A. Thomas (9)	A. Thomas (5)	Gateway Center Arena; N/A

2023 WNBA regular season
May

Date	Time (ET)	Matchup			TV	Result	High points	High rebounds	High assists	Location
Friday, May 19
Friday, May 19	7:00 p.m.	Connecticut	@	Indiana	League Pass	70–61	K. Mitchell (20)	A. Thomas (11)	A. Thomas (6)	Gainbridge Fieldhouse; 7,356
Friday, May 19	7:00 p.m.	New York	@	Washington	USA: NBA TV; Canada: NBA TV Canada	64–80	Ionescu (18)	Stewart (11)	Tied (6)	Entertainment and Sports Arena; 4,200
Friday, May 19	8:00 p.m.	Chicago	@	Minnesota	League Pass, Meta (VR)	77–66	Copper (20)	Shepard (8)	Shepard (7)	Target Center; 8,024
Friday, May 19	10:00 p.m.	Phoenix	@	Los Angeles	USA: ESPN, ESPN+ Canada: NBA TV Canada	71–94	Griner (18)	3 tied (7)	Tied (5)	Crypto.com Arena; 10,396
Saturday, May 20
Saturday, May 20	1:00 p.m.	Atlanta	@	Dallas	ABC	78–85	Ogunbowale (27)	Ch. Parker (11)	A. Gray (7)	College Park Center; 5,588
Saturday, May 20	3:00 p.m.	Las Vegas	@	Seattle	USA: ABC; Canada: TSN1	105–64	Tied (23)	Wilson (13)	C. Gray (6)	Climate Pledge Arena; 11,229
Sunday, May 21
Sunday, May 21	1:00 p.m.	Washington	@	Connecticut	League Pass	74–80	Tied (21)	A. Thomas (16)	Tied (6)	Mohegan Sun Arena; 7,048
Sunday, May 21	2:00 p.m.	Indiana	@	New York	Twitter, Meta (VR)	73–90	Stewart (45)	Tied (12)	Tied (8)	Barclays Center; 8,575
Sunday, May 21	4:00 p.m.	Chicago	@	Phoenix	USA: ESPN, ESPN+ Canada: SN360	75–69	Griner (27)	Tied (10)	C. Williams (7)	Footprint Center; 14,040
Tuesday, May 23
Tuesday, May 23	7:00 p.m.	Connecticut	@	Washington	League Pass	88–81	Delle Donne (27)	A. Thomas (10)	Hayes (8)	Entertainment and Sports Arena; 3,383
Tuesday, May 23	8:00 p.m.	Atlanta	@	Minnesota	Twitter, Meta (VR)	83–77	A. Gray (26)	Tied (10)	Tied (6)	Target Center; 7,803
Thursday, May 25
Thursday, May 25	10:00 p.m.	Las Vegas	@	Los Angeles	CBS Sports Network	94–85	Young (30)	Wilson (13)	C. Gray (8)	Crypto.com Arena; 7,314
Thursday, May 25	10:00 p.m.	Minnesota	@	Phoenix	Amazon Prime Video	81–90	Taurasi (23)	Turner (11)	Taurasi (10)	Footprint Center; 6,057
Friday, May 26
Friday, May 26	8:00 p.m.	Washington	@	Chicago	ION	71–69	Delle Donne (25)	Austin (11)	Cloud (7)	Wintrust Arena; 7,304
Friday, May 26	10:00 p.m.	Dallas	@	Seattle	ION	95–91	Loyd (30)	Magbegor (12)	Ogunbowale (6)	Climate Pledge Arena; 8,277
Saturday, May 27
Saturday, May 27	1:00 p.m.	Connecticut	@	New York	CBS, Paramount+	65–81	Stewart (21)	Tied (8)	Vandersloot (10)	Barclays Center; 7,102
Saturday, May 27	9:00 p.m.	Los Angeles	@	Las Vegas	NBA TV	65–93	Wilson (23)	Stokes (9)	C. Gray (7)	Michelob Ultra Arena; 10,191
Sunday, May 28
Sunday, May 28	3:00 p.m.	Indiana	@	Atlanta	USA: NBA TV; Canada: SN360	90–87	Tied (23)	N. Smith (12)	Tied (4)	Gateway Center Arena; 3,209
Sunday, May 28	6:00 p.m.	Dallas	@	Chicago	USA: NBA TV; Canada: TSN3	88–94	Ogunbowale (27)	A. Smith (12)	Tied (6)	Wintrust Arena; 6,042
Sunday, May 28	9:00 p.m.	Minnesota	@	Las Vegas	CBS Sports Network	73–94	Young (23)	Shepard (15)	C. Gray (10)	Michelob Ultra Arena; 7,970
Tuesday, May 30
Tuesday, May 30	7:00 p.m.	Chicago	@	Atlanta	Twitter, Meta (VR)	83–65	R. Howard (20)	Tied (8)	Evans (5)	Gateway Center Arena; 2,562
Tuesday, May 30	7:00 p.m.	Indiana	@	Connecticut	USA: League Pass; Canada: NBA TV Canada	78–81	Hayes (22)	A. Thomas (17)	Tied (7)	Mohegan Sun Arena; 5,317
Tuesday, May 30	8:00 p.m.	Minnesota	@	Dallas	ESPN3	89–94	N. Howard (25)	S. Sabally (11)	Burton (9)	College Park Center; 3,484
Tuesday, May 30	9:00 p.m.	New York	@	Seattle	USA: ESPN2; Canada: NBA TV Canada	86–78	Loyd (26)	Magbegor (14)	Vandersloot (11)	Climate Pledge Arena; 8,340

June

Date	Time (ET)	Matchup			TV	Result	High points	High rebounds	High assists	Location
Thursday, June 1	8:00 p.m.	Connecticut	@	Minnesota	Amazon Prime Video	89–84	N. Collier (30)	Shepard (12)	A. Thomas (16)	Target Center; 8,124
Friday, June 2
Friday, June 2	6:00 p.m.	New York	@	Chicago	ION	77–76	Copper (20)	Stewart (11)	Vandersloot (8)	Wintrust Arena; 7,188
Friday, June 2	7:00 p.m.	Dallas	@	Washington	ION	74–75	Delle Donne (23)	S. Sabally (14)	Cloud (8)	Entertainment and Sports Arena; 3,294
Friday, June 2	7:30 p.m.	Las Vegas	@	Atlanta	ION	92–87	Ch. Parker (25)	Ch. Parker (11)	McDonald (7)	Gateway Center Arena; 3,209
Friday, June 2	10:00 p.m.	Los Angeles	@	Phoenix	ION	99–93 (OT)	L. Brown (26)	N. Ogwumike (12)	Tied (6)	Footprint Center; 8,815
Saturday, June 3
Saturday, June 3	7:00 p.m.	Minnesota	@	Washington	USA: League Pass; Canada: NBA TV Canada	80–78	McBride (24)	Austin (10)	Cloud (9)	Entertainment and Sports Arena; 3,534
Saturday, June 3	10:00 p.m.	Seattle	@	Los Angeles	CBS Sports Network	85–92	Loyd (37)	N. Ogwumike (14)	Canada (7)	Crypto.com Arena; 6,866
Sunday, June 4
Sunday, June 4	1:00 p.m.	Dallas	@	Connecticut	USA: NBA TV; Canada: SN1	74–80	S. Sabally (26)	S. Sabally (14)	Burton (7)	Mohegan Sun Arena; 5,012
Sunday, June 4	2:00 p.m.	Chicago	@	New York	CBS Sports Network	86–82	Copper (27)	Stewart (11)	Vandersloot (10)	Barclays Center; 7,225
Sunday, June 4	4:00 p.m.	Las Vegas	@	Indiana	CBS Sports Network	84–80	Wilson (27)	Tied (10)	C. Gray (7)	Gainbridge Fieldhouse; 6,131
Tuesday, June 6
Tuesday, June 6	7:00 p.m.	Las Vegas	@	Connecticut	League Pass	90–84	Wilson (23)	A. Thomas (11)	3 tied (7)	Mohegan Sun Arena; 4,368
Tuesday, June 6	8:00 p.m.	Indiana	@	Chicago	CBS Sports Network	103–108 (OT)	Mabrey (28)	Boston (11)	E. Wheeler (12)	Wintrust Arena; 5,201
Tuesday, June 6	10:00 p.m.	Los Angeles	@	Seattle	CBS Sports Network	63–66	Loyd (25)	N. Ogwumike (11)	Canada (5)	Climate Pledge Arena; 7,840
Wednesday, June 7
Wednesday, June 7	8:00 p.m.	Phoenix	@	Dallas	League Pass	79–84	Tied (24)	K. Brown (15)	Taurasi	College Park Center; 4,242
Thursday, June 8	7:00 p.m.	Las Vegas	@	Connecticut	Amazon Prime Video	77–94	Bonner (41)	B. Jones (9)	A. Thomas (12)	Mohegan Sun Arena; 5,147
Friday, June 9
Friday, June 9	7:30 p.m.	New York	@	Atlanta	ION	106–83	Ionescu (37)	Stewart (9)	Vandersloot (11)	Gateway Center Arena; 3,209
Friday, June 9	8:00 p.m.	Phoenix	@	Dallas	ION	77–90	Ogunbowale (35)	S. Sabally (16)	Sutton (9)	College Park Center; 6,251
Friday, June 9	8:00 p.m.	Indiana	@	Minnesota	ION	71–69	N. Collier (28)	N. Collier (14)	3 tied (4)	Target Center; 8,510
Friday, June 9	10:00 p.m.	Chicago	@	Los Angeles	ION	62–77	Tied (19)	N. Ogwumike (14)	Tied (5)	Crypto.com Arena; 5,431
Friday, June 9	10:00 p.m.	Washington	@	Seattle	ION	73–66	Magbegor (24)	Austin (11)	Atkins (6)	Climate Pledge Arena; 8,397
Sunday, June 11
Sunday, June 11	1:00 p.m.	Dallas	@	New York	USA: ABC; Canada: SN1	93–102	Stewart (32)	S. Sabally (11)	Vandersloot (10)	Barclays Center; 7,615
Sunday, June 11	3:00 p.m.	Washington	@	Seattle	USA: ABC; Canada: TSN5, NBA TV Canada	71–65	Cloud (19)	Austin (9)	Tied (5)	Climate Pledge Arena; 13,213
Sunday, June 11	3:00 p.m.	Chicago	@	Las Vegas	ESPN3	80–93	Wilson (21)	Wilson (10)	Evans (8)	Michelob Ultra Arena; 9,786
Sunday, June 11	4:00 p.m.	Connecticut	@	Atlanta	ESPN3	89–77	Ch. Parker (20)	Ch. Parker (14)	A. Thomas (8)	Gateway Center Arena; 2,690
Sunday, June 11	5:00 p.m.	Phoenix	@	Indiana	CBS Sports Network	85–82	Tied (29)	Tied (12)	E. Wheeler (8)	Gainbridge Fieldhouse; 5,013
Sunday, June 11	7:00 p.m.	Los Angeles	@	Minnesota	League Pass, Meta (VR)	86–91	N. Ogwumike (27)	Shepard (13)	Canada (8)	Target Center; 8,025
Tuesday, June 13
Tuesday, June 13	7:00 p.m.	Washington	@	Indiana	Twitter, Meta (VR)	66–87	Boston (23)	Boston (14)	Boston (6)	Gainbridge Fieldhouse; 3,005
Tuesday, June 13	7:00 p.m.	Atlanta	@	New York	CBS Sports Network	86–79	Johannès (18)	Stewart (13)	Tied (6)	Barclays Center; 5,719
Tuesday, June 13	10:00 p.m.	Seattle	@	Phoenix	CBS Sports Network	83–69	Cunningham (21)	Horston (14)	Peddy (7)	Footprint Center; 7,044
Wednesday, June 14
Wednesday, June 14	1:00 p.m.	Los Angeles	@	Dallas	USA: NBA TV; Canada: TSN3/4, NBA TV Canada	79–61	Hamby (23)	S. Sabally (13)	Canada (6)	College Park Center; 5,807
Thursday, June 15
Thursday, June 15	7:00 p.m.	Atlanta	@	Connecticut	Amazon Prime Video	92–88 (OT)	B. Jones (28)	B. Jones (13)	H. Jones (9)	Mohegan Sun Arena; 4,316
Thursday, June 15	8:00 p.m.	Indiana	@	Chicago	NBA TV	92–90	Mabrey (36)	A. Smith (11)	C. Williams (10)	Wintrust Arena; 6,323
Thursday, June 15	10:00 p.m.	Seattle	@	Las Vegas	Amazon Prime Video	63–96	Young (28)	Wilson (12)	C. Gray (9)	Michelob Ultra Arena; 8,518
Friday, June 16
Friday, June 16	7:00 p.m.	Phoenix	@	Washington	ION	69–88	Onyenwere (20)	Onyenwere (9)	Sutton (8)	Entertainment and Sports Arena; N/A
Friday, June 16	10:00 p.m.	Minnesota	@	Los Angeles	ION	77–72	N. Collier (25)	Hamby (9)	N. Ogwumike (7)	Crypto.com Arena; 5,265
Saturday, June 17
Saturday, June 17	2:00 p.m.	Seattle	@	Dallas	CBS, Paramount+	109–103	Ogunbowale (41)	Tied (10)	Dojkić (7)	College Park Center; 5,020
Sunday, June 18
Sunday, June 18	12:00 p.m.	Phoenix	@	New York	CBS, Paramount+	71–89	Stewart (28)	Stewart (14)	Sutton (9)	Barclays Center; 9,278
Sunday, June 18	3:00 p.m.	Chicago	@	Washington	Twitter, Meta (VR)	69–77	Dell Donne (20)	A. Smith (13)	Cloud (5)	Entertainment and Sports Arena; 4,009
Sunday, June 18	4:00 p.m.	Atlanta	@	Indiana	CBS Sports Network	100–94	Tied (25)	Tied (7)	E. Wheeler (8)	Gainbridge Fieldhouse; 4,024
Sunday, June 18	7:30 p.m.	Connecticut	@	Los Angeles	USA: League Pass; Canada: NBA TV Canada	83–74	Bonner (20)	N. Ogwumike (15)	A. Thomas (12)	Crypto.com Arena; 6,289
Sunday, June 18	9:00 p.m.	Minnesota	@	Las Vegas	NBA TV	62–93	Young (24)	Wilson (14)	Tied (5)	Michelob Ultra Arena; 8,036
Tuesday, June 20
Tuesday, June 20	8:00 p.m.	Atlanta	@	Dallas	NBA TV	73–85	N. Howard (23)	K. Brown (14)	Dangerfield (5)	College Park Center; 3,392
Tuesday, June 20	10:00 p.m.	Minnesota	@	Los Angeles	CBS Sports Network	67–61	N. Collier (26)	N. Collier (14)	L. Allen (8)	Crypto.com Arena; 4,180
Tuesday, June 20	10:00 p.m.	Connecticut	@	Seattle	USA: NBA TV; Canada: TSN1/4	85–79	Loyd (33)	A. Thomas (15)	A. Thomas (12)	Climate Pledge Arena; 7,022
Wednesday, June 21
Wednesday, June 21	3:30 p.m.	Las Vegas	@	Phoenix	USA: NBA TV; Canada: SN1	99–79	Young (23)	Wilson (12)	C. Gray (8)	Footprint Center; 11,580
Thursday, June 22
Thursday, June 22	8:00 p.m.	Washington	@	Chicago	Amazon Prime Video	80–59	Delle Donne (18)	Sykes (11)	C. Williams (9)	Wintrust Arena; 6,158
Thursday, June 22	8:00 p.m.	Connecticut	@	Minnesota	CBS Sports Network	89–68	Tied (21)	A. Thomas (9)	L. Allen (7)	Target Center; 7,024
Thursday, June 22	10:00 p.m.	Indiana	@	Seattle	Amazon Prime Video	80–68	K. Mitchell (25)	N. Smith (14)	Dojkić (6)	Climate Pledge Arena; 7,734
Friday, June 23
Friday, June 23	7:30 p.m.	New York	@	Atlanta	ION	110–80	R. Howard (24)	Stewart (11)	Vandersloot (11)	Gateway Center Arena; 3,209
Friday, June 23	10:00 p.m.	Dallas	@	Los Angeles	ION	74–76	N. Howard (23)	N. Howard (12)	Canada (6)	Crypto.com Arena; 5,766
Saturday, June 24
Saturday, June 24	9:00 p.m.	Indiana	@	Las Vegas	USA: NBA TV; Canada: NBA TV Canada	88–101	Wilson (28)	N. Smith (11)	C. Gray (12)	Michelob Ultra Arena; 8,310
Saturday, June 24	9:00 p.m.	Phoenix	@	Seattle	Twitter, Meta (VR)	74–97	Loyd (24)	Loyd (7)	Sutton (7)	Climate Pledge Arena; 9,122
Sunday, June 25
Sunday, June 25	1:00 p.m.	Chicago	@	Connecticut	USA: ESPN3; Canada: NBA TV Canada	72–96	Copper (29)	A. Thomas (11)	A. Thomas (12)	Mohegan Sun Arena; 6,517
Sunday, June 25	1:00 p.m.	Washington	@	New York	USA: ABC; Canada: TSN1/4	88–89 (OT)	Ionescu	J. Jones (10)	Cloud (11)	Barclays Center; 7,285
Sunday, June 25	3:00 p.m.	Dallas	@	Los Angeles	USA: ABC; Canada: NBA TV Canada	83–93	N. Ogwumike (27)	N. Ogwumike (12)	Canada (9)	Crypto.com Arena; 6,380
Monday, June 26	10:00 p.m.	Indiana	@	Las Vegas	CBS Sports Network	80–88	C. Gray (25)	Tied (14)	C. Gray (5)	Michelob Ultra Arena; 8,143
Tuesday, June 27
Tuesday, June 27	7:00 p.m.	New York	@	Connecticut	NBA TV	89–81	Stewart (24)	J. Jones (11)	A. Thomas (10)	Mohegan Sun Arena; 7,344
Tuesday, June 27	8:00 p.m.	Seattle	@	Minnesota	CBS Sports Network	93–104	N. Collier (33)	Juhász (12)	Tied (9)	Target Center; 7,014
Tuesday, June 27	10:00 p.m.	Dallas	@	Phoenix	CBS Sports Network	77–62	Ogunbowale (23)	S. Sabally (12)	S. Sabally (6)	Footprint Center; 5,652
Wednesday, June 28
Wednesday, June 28	12:00 p.m.	Los Angeles	@	Chicago	USA: NBA TV; Canada: SN1	63–80	C. Williams (21)	N. Ogwumike (11)	Canada (5)	Wintrust Arena; 8,810
Wednesday, June 28	7:00 p.m.	Atlanta	@	Washington	NBA TV	86–109	Delle Donne (25)	Hawkins (11)	Sykes (10)	Entertainment and Sports Arena; 3,624
Thursday, June 29
Thursday, June 29	10:00 p.m.	New York	@	Las Vegas	Amazon Prime Video	81–98	Plum (18)	3 tied (6)	Plum (8)	Michelob Ultra Arena; 9,587
Thursday, June 29	10:00 p.m.	Indiana	@	Phoenix	NBA TV	63–85	Griner (22)	Tied (9)	Taurasi (6)	Footprint Center; 9,047
Thursday, June 29	10:00 p.m.	Minnesota	@	Seattle	CBS Sports Network	99–97 (OT)	Loyd (41)	Magbegor (16)	Dojkić (10)	Climate Pledge Arena; 6,894
Friday, June 30
Friday, June 30	7:30 p.m.	Washington	@	Atlanta	ION	89–94	Delle Donne (31)	Tied (6)	R. Howard (8)	Gateway Center Arena; 3,209
Friday, June 30	8:00 p.m.	Los Angeles	@	Chicago	ION	78–86	A. Smith (18)	Hamby (12)	C. Williams (13)	Wintrust Arena; 7,272

July

Date	Time (ET)	Matchup			TV	Result	High points	High rebounds	High assists	Location
Saturday, July 1
Saturday, July 1	3:00 p.m.	Connecticut	@	Las Vegas	USA: ABC; Canada: NBA TV Canada	84–102	Plum (25)	Wilson (13)	A. Thomas (11)	Michelob Ultra Arena; 8,596
Saturday, July 1	10:00 p.m.	Minnesota	@	Phoenix	USA: NBA TV; Canada: NBA TV Canada	86–76	D. Miller (25)	Turner (13)	L. Allen (8)	Footprint Center; 8,777
Sunday, July 2
Sunday, July 2	3:00 p.m.	Los Angeles	@	Atlanta	ESPN3	84–112	R. Howard (43)	Hamby (8)	Henderson (6)	Gateway Center Arena; 3,209
Sunday, July 2	3:00 p.m.	Washington	@	Dallas	USA: ABC; Canada: SN1	72–89	S. Sabally (27)	S. Sabally (15)	Cloud (6)	College Park Center; 4,544
Sunday, July 2	4:00 p.m.	Chicago	@	Indiana	ESPN3	89–87	C. Williams (28)	E. Williams (9)	Tied (8)	Gainbridge Fieldhouse; 4,004
Sunday, July 2	6:00 p.m.	New York	@	Seattle	CBS Sports Network	81–66	Loyd (27)	Magbegor (9)	Vanersloot (13)	Climate Pledge Arena; 9,110
Wednesday, July 5
Wednesday, July 5	7:00 p.m.	Phoenix	@	New York	USA: Twitter, Meta (VR); Canada: TSN3/4	95–99	Stewart (43)	Stewart (12)	Ionescu (9)	Barclays Center; 7,151
Wednesday, July 5	8:00 p.m.	Indiana	@	Minnesota	League Pass	83–90	N. Collier (32)	N. Smith (11)	E. Wheeler (7)	Target Center; 7,624
Wednesday, July 5	10:00 p.m.	Dallas	@	Las Vegas	League Pass	82–89	N. Howard (32)	Tied (13)	Ogunbowale (7)	Michelob Ultra Arena; 10,177
Wednesday, July 5	10:00 p.m.	Atlanta	@	Los Angeles	CBS Sports Network	90–79	A. Gray (23)	Stevens (12)	Canada (7)	Crypto.com Arena; 5,912
Thursday, July 6	7:00 p.m.	Seattle	@	Connecticut	Amazon Prime Video	73–93	Loyd (22)	Tied (9)	A. Thomas (7)	Mohegan Sun Arena; 5,479
Friday, July 7
Friday, July 7	7:00 p.m.	Indiana	@	Washington	ION	88–96	Sykes (29)	Atkins (10)	E. Wheeler (7)	Entertainment and Sports Arena; 4,200
Friday, July 7	8:00 p.m.	Atlanta	@	Chicago	ION	82–68	A. Gray (21)	Ch. Parker (10)	C. Williams (7)	Wintrust Arena; 7,911
Friday, July 7	8:00 p.m.	Las Vegas	@	Dallas	ION	78–80	Tied (21)	McCowan (12)	Tied (6)	College Park Center; 6,251
Friday, July 7	8:00 p.m.	Phoenix	@	Minnesota	ION	64–75	Onyenwere (24)	N. Collier (12)	Sutton (10)	Target Center; 7,714
Saturday, July 8	2:00 p.m.	Seattle	@	New York	USA: ESPN; Canada: NBA TV Canada	76–80	Stewart (25)	Mendjiadeu (14)	Ionescu (8)	Barclays Center; 6,789
Sunday, July 9
Sunday, July 9	3:00 p.m.	Washington	@	Connecticut	ESPN	84–92	Bonner (28)	A. Thomas (9)	Sykes (7)	Mohegan Sun Arena; 6,558
Sunday, July 9	4:00 p.m.	Dallas	@	Indiana	ESPN3	77–76	Ogunbowale (28)	Tied (8)	3 tied (5)	Gainbridge Fieldhouse; 3,612
Sunday, July 9	6:00 p.m.	Los Angeles	@	Phoenix	League Pass, Meta (VR)	72–78	Griner (29)	Ogwumike (14)	Jefferson (8)	Footprint Center; 9,206
Sunday, July 9	7:00 p.m.	Las Vegas	@	Minnesota	League Pass	113–89	Plum (40)	Wilson (10)	C. Gray (10)	Target Center; 7,701
Sunday, July 9	8:00 p.m.	Atlanta	@	Chicago	League Pass	88–77	R. Howard (32)	Ch. Parker (11)	C. Willimas (7)	Wintrust Arena; 7,325
Tuesday, July 11
Tuesday, July 11	7:00 p.m.	Seattle	@	Washington	League Pass	86–93	Loyd (39)	Fankam Mendjiadeu (11)	Cloud (8)	Entertainment and Sports Arena; 3,571
Tuesday, July 11	10:00 p.m.	Phoenix	@	Las Vegas	CBS Sports Network	72–98	Young (23)	Turner (9)	C. Gray (11)	Michelob Ultra Arena; 10,281
Wednesday, July 12
Wednesday, July 12	12:00 p.m.	New York	@	Indiana	USA: NBA TV; Canada: NBA TV Canada	95–87 (OT)	Ionescu (34)	Stewart (10)	Vandersloot (12)	Gainbridge Fieldhouse; 6,123
Wednesday, July 12	12:00 p.m.	Connecticut	@	Chicago	League Pass	84–72	Tied (22)	Tied (8)	A. Thomas (10)	Wintrust Arena; 9,025
Wednesday, July 12	1:00 p.m.	Dallas	@	Minnesota	USA: Twitter, Meta (VR); Canada: SN360	107–67	N. Howard (28)	N. Howard (14)	Ogunbowale (11)	Target Center; 13,531
Wednesday, July 12	7:00 p.m.	Seattle	@	Atlanta	USA: League Pass; Canada: TSN3/4	75–85	Horston (23)	Horston (10)	3 tied (5)	Gateway Center Arena; 2,546
Wednesday, July 12	10:00 p.m.	Las Vegas	@	Los Angeles	CBS Sports Network	97–78	Wilson (25)	Tied (12)	Samuelson (6)	Crypto.com Arena; 8,085
Saturday, July 15	8:30 p.m.	WNBA All-Star Game			USA: ABC; Canada: TSN4, SN360	143–127	Loyd (31)	Griner (13)	Stewart (9)	Michelob Ultra Arena; 9,472
Tuesday, July 18
Tuesday, July 18	7:00 p.m.	Minnesota	@	Atlanta	USA: NBA TV; Canada: NBA TV Canada	73–82	N. Collier (35)	Juhász (12)	R. Howard (7)	Gateway Center Arena; 2,394
Tuesday, July 18	10:00 p.m.	Connecticut	@	Phoenix	CBS Sports Network	66–72	Bonner (19)	Bonner (10)	A. Thomas (7)	Footprint Center; 7,788
Wednesday, July 19
Wednesday, July 19	11:30 a.m.	Indiana	@	Washington	League Pass	82–76	Cloud (19)	Hawkins (9)	Sykes (7)	Capital One Arena; 14,406
Wednesday, July 19	1:00 p.m.	Dallas	@	New York	USA: NBA TV; Canada: SN1	98–88	Tied (25)	McCowan (12)	3 tied (7)	Barclays Center; 9,012
Thursday, July 20
Thursday, July 20	11:30 a.m.	Atlanta	@	Connecticut	USA: NBA TV; Canada: NBA TV Canada	71–82	Hiedeman (24)	Coffey (13)	Tied (7)	Mohegan Sun Arena; 8,054
Thursday, July 20	8:00 p.m.	Los Angeles	@	Minnesota	Amazon Prime Video	70–73	N. Collier (22)	Juhász (10)	D. Miller (9)	Target Center; 7,014
Thursday, July 20	10:00 p.m.	Chicago	@	Phoenix	USA: NBA TV; Canada: NBA TV Canada	62–80	Peddy (20)	Griner (11)	Cunningham (7)	Footprint Center; 11,292
Thursday, July 20	10:00 p.m.	Las Vegas	@	Seattle	Amazon Prime Video	79–63	Wilson (23)	Wilson (15)	C. Gray (8)	Climate Pledge Arena; 7,873
Friday, July 21	7:00 p.m.	New York	@	Washington	ION	96–87	Sykes (29)	Tied (11)	Ionescu (9)	Entertainment and Sports Arena; 4,200
Saturday, July 22
Saturday, July 22	1:00 p.m.	Connecticut	@	Atlanta	USA: ESPN; Canada: TSN3/5	86–78	R. Howard (22)	A. Thomas (11)	A. Thomas (8)	Gateway Center Arena; 3,209
Saturday, July 22	3:00 p.m.	Las Vegas	@	Minnesota	USA: ESPN; Canada: NBA TV Canada	98–81	Wilson (35)	Wilson (14)	C. Gray (11)	Target Center; 7,801
Saturday, July 22	8:00 p.m.	Los Angeles	@	Dallas	Twitter, Meta (VR)	84–98	N. Howard (28)	Tied (11)	Canada (7)	College Park Center; 5,041
Saturday, July 22	9:00 p.m.	Chicago	@	Seattle	USA: NBA TV; Canada: NBA TV Canada	90–75	Copper (29)	A. Smith (17)	Mabrey (6)	Climate Pledge Arena; 8,655
Sunday, July 23	1:00 p.m.	Phoenix	@	Washington	CBS, Paramount+	69–84	Tied (23)	Tied (7)	Cloud (9)	Entertainment and Sports Arena; 4,200
Sunday, July 23	3:00 p.m.	Indiana	@	New York	USA: NBA TV; Canada: TSN4	83–101	Laney (22)	J. Jones (11)	Vandersloot (10)	Barclays Center; 7,371
Tuesday, July 25	7:00 p.m.	Phoenix	@	Atlanta	ESPN3	65–78	Gustafson (19)	Gustafson (8)	H. Jones (5)	Gateway Center Arena; 3,209
Tuesday, July 25	7:00 p.m.	Seattle	@	New York	ESPN3	82–86	Loyd (32)	J. Jones (17)	Ionescu (12)	Barclays Center; 6,118
Tuesday, July 25	7:00 p.m.	Las Vegas	@	Chicago	ESPN	107–95	Copper (37)	Stokes (17)	C. Williams (11)	Wintrust Arena; 9,025
Tuesday, July 25	8:00 p.m.	Connecticut	@	Dallas	USA: ESPN3; Canada: NBA TV Canada	88–83	Bonner (32)	McCowan (15)	A. Thomas (7)	College Park Center; 4,222
Tuesday, July 25	10:00 p.m.	Indiana	@	Los Angeles	USA: NBA TV; Canada: NBA TV Canada	78–79	N. Ogwumike (30)	N. Ogwumike (8)	Canada (10)	Crypto.com Arena; 5,565
Wednesday, July 26	8:00 p.m.	Washington	@	Minnesota	USA: NBA TV; Canada: NBA TV Canada	92–97	Tied (24)	N. Collier (11)	D. Miller (9)	Target Center; 7,024
Thursday, July 27
Thursday, July 27	3:30 p.m.	Indiana	@	Los Angeles	USA: NBA TV; Canada: SN1	68–81	N. Ogwumike (25)	N. Ogwumike (9)	Tied (7)	Crypto.com Arena; 11,970
Thursday, July 27	7:00 p.m.	Atlanta	@	New York	Amazon Prime Video	84–95	Stewart (33)	J. Jones (13)	Ionescu (9)	Barclays Center; 6,206
Friday, July 28
Friday, July 28	8:00 p.m.	Seattle	@	Chicago	ION	83–74	3 tied (17)	Whitcomb (10)	Loyd (6)	Wintrust Arena; 7,213
Friday, July 28	8:00 p.m.	Washington	@	Dallas	ION	62–90	Tied (18)	S. Sabally (11)	S. Sabally (10)	College Park Center; 4,048
Friday, July 28	8:00 p.m.	Minnesota	@	New York	ION	88–83	Ionescu (31)	J. Jones (11)	Ionescu (7)	Barclays Center; 6,129
Sunday, July 30
Sunday, July 30	1:00 p.m.	Minnesota	@	Connecticut	CBS Sports Network	87–83	Bonner (31)	Tied (14)	A. Thomas (11)	Mohegan Sun Arena; 8,275
Sunday, July 30	3:00 p.m.	Washington	@	Atlanta	ESPN3	73–80	A. Gray (27)	Hawkins (10)	Tied (5)	Gateway Center Arena; 3,209
Sunday, July 30	4:00 p.m.	New York	@	Los Angeles	USA: ESPN; Canada: NBA TV Canada	87–79	Stewart (25)	J. Jones (13)	Vandersloot (9)	Crypto.com Arena; 8,139
Sunday, July 30	4:00 p.m.	Seattle	@	Indiana	ESPN3	85–62	Loyd (26)	Boston (7)	Loyd (8)	Gainbridge Fieldhouse; 5,196
Sunday, July 30	4:00 p.m.	Phoenix	@	Chicago	ESPN3	85–104	Tied (24)	Gustafson (8)	C. Williams (9)	Wintrust Arena; 8,914
Sunday, July 30	6:00 p.m.	Dallas	@	Las Vegas	CBS Sports Network	91–104	Plum (28)	McCowan (14)	C. Gray (8)	Michelob Ultra Arena; 10,213

August

Date	Time (ET)	Matchup			TV	Result	High points	High rebounds	High assists	Location
Tuesday, August 1
Tuesday, August 1	7:00 p.m.	Minnesota	@	Connecticut	USA: ESPN; Canada: TSN5	69–79	A. Thomas (21)	A. Thomas (20)	A. Thomas (12)	Mohegan Sun Arena; 4,894
Tuesday, August 1	7:00 p.m.	Phoenix	@	Indiana	ESPN3	71–72	Taurasi (29)	Boston (11)	Tied (4)	Gainbridge Fieldhouse; 3,018
Tuesday, August 1	10:00 p.m.	Atlanta	@	Las Vegas	League Pass	72–93	Young (24)	Wilson (11)	C. Gray (7)	Michelob Ultra Arena; 8,366
Tuesday, August 1	10:00 p.m.	New York	@	Los Angeles	USA: NBA TV; Canada: NBA TV Canada	76–69	Vandersloot (23)	Stewart (12)	Tied (6)	Crypto.com Arena; 6,498
Wednesday, August 2	10:30 p.m.	Dallas	@	Seattle	CBS Sports Network	76–65	Loyd (31)	N. Howard (12)	G. Williams (5)	Climate Pledge Arena; 7,421
Thursday, August 3	10:00 p.m.	Atlanta	@	Phoenix	Amazon Prime Video	71–91	Taurasi (42)	Tied (8)	McDonald (5)	Footprint Center; 7,564
Friday, August 4
Friday, August 4	7:00 p.m.	Connecticut	@	Indiana	ION	88–72	Boston (19)	Nelson-Ododa (10)	A. Thomas (8)	Gainbridge Fieldhouse; 3,498
Friday, August 4	7:00 p.m.	Los Angeles	@	Washington	ION	77–79	Stevens (19)	Tied (9)	Sykes (8)	Entertainment and Sports Arena; 3,747
Friday, August 4	8:00 p.m.	Chicago	@	Dallas	ION	104–89	N. Howard (28)	N. Howard (12)	N. Howard (11)	College Park Center; 3,762
Friday, August 4	8:00 p.m.	New York	@	Minnesota	ION	76–66	Tied (18)	J. Jones (17)	L. Allen (10)	Target Center; 7,631
Saturday, August 5	10:00 p.m.	Seattle	@	Phoenix	USA: NBA TV; Canada: SN360	97–91	Loyd (32)	Russell (8)	Sutton (8)	Footprint Center; 9,411
Sunday, August 6
Sunday, August 6	3:00 p.m.	Las Vegas	@	New York	USA: ABC; Canada: TSN3/4	61–99	Ionescu (31)	J. Jones (14)	Ionescu (7)	Barclays Center; 11,418
Sunday, August 6	3:00 p.m.	Indiana	@	Atlanta	ESPN3	73–82	Boston (25)	Boston (10)	Wheeler (5)	Gateway Center Arena; 3,209
Sunday, August 6	3:00 p.m.	Los Angeles	@	Washington	ESPN3	91–83	Hawkins (23)	N. Ogwumike (10)	Tied (7)	Entertainment and Sports Arena; 4,073
Sunday, August 6	4:00 p.m.	Chicago	@	Dallas	ESPN3	104–96	Mabrey (32)	McCowan (9)	Tied (8)	College Park Center; 4,057
Tuesday, August 8
Tuesday, August 8	3:00 p.m.	Connecticut	@	Seattle	USA: NBA TV; Canada: SN360	81–69	Bonner (21)	Tied (12)	A. Thomas (8)	Climate Pledge Arena; 10,212
Tuesday, August 8	7:00 p.m.	Los Angeles	@	Indiana	League Pass, Meta (VR)	87–80	K. Mitchell (21)	N. Ogwumike (11)	Tied (7)	Gainbridge Fieldhouse; 3,006
Tuesday, August 8	8:00 p.m.	Minnesota	@	Chicago	USA: NBA TV; Canada: NBA TV Canada	88–79	N. Collier (29)	D. Miller (11)	McBride (7)	Wintrust Arena; 5,099
Tuesday, August 8	8:00 p.m.	Las Vegas	@	Dallas	CBS Sports Network	104–84	Wilson (28)	Wilson (14)	Plum (8)	College Park Center; 5,193
Tuesday, August 8	10:00 p.m.	Washington	@	Phoenix	CBS Sports Network	72–91	Sykes (24)	Turner (9)	Hines-Allen (7)	Footprint Center; 6,610
Thursday, August 10
Thursday, August 10	7:00 p.m.	Minnesota	@	Indiana	Amazon Prime Video	73–91	K. Mitchell (24)	Boston (13)	Wheeler (10)	Gainbridge Fieldhouse; 2,551
Thursday, August 10	10:00 p.m.	Connecticut	@	Phoenix	Amazon Prime Video	84–90	R. Allen (24)	A. Thomas (11)	A. Thomas (8)	Footprint Center; 7,186
Thursday, August 10	10:00 p.m.	Atlanta	@	Seattle	USA: NBA TV; Canada: NBA TV Canada	67–68	R. Howard (20)	Tied (11)	Whitcomb (5)	Climate Pledge Arena; 7,649
Friday, August 11
Friday, August 11	8:00 p.m.	Chicago	@	New York	ION	73–89	Stewart (21)	Stewart (12)	Ionescu (8)	Barclays Center; 8,070
Friday, August 11	10:00 p.m.	Washington	@	Las Vegas	ION	89–113	Wilson (40)	Wilson (12)	Tied (10)	Michelob Ultra Arena; 9,364
Saturday, August 12
Saturday, August 12	7:30 p.m.	Atlanta	@	Los Angeles	League Pass	74–85	Canada (20)	Stevens (8)	Canada (8)	Crypto.com Arena; 7,119
Saturday, August 12	8:00 p.m.	Connecticut	@	Dallas	League Pass	81–91	S. Sabally (28)	A. Thomas (10)	Tied (6)	College Park Center; 4,179
Sunday, August 13
Sunday, August 13	3:00 p.m.	New York	@	Indiana	USA: ESPN; Canada: NBA TV Canada	100–89	Stewart (42)	J. Jones (12)	Vandersloot (14)	Gainbridge Fieldhouse; 5,019
Sunday, August 13	3:00 p.m.	Chicago	@	Washington	ESPN3	76–83	Sykes (30)	E. Williams (12)	C. Williams (7)	Entertainment and Sports Arena; 3,796
Sunday, August 13	6:00 p.m.	Phoenix	@	Seattle	USA: NBA TV; Canada: SN360	71–81	Cunningham (25)	Tied (10)	Whitcomb (8)	Climate Pledge Arena; 10,107
Sunday, August 13	9:00 p.m.	Atlanta	@	Las Vegas	CBS Sports Network	65–86	Wilson (21)	Stokes (12)	C. Gray (6)	Michelob Ultra Arena; 8,564
Tuesday, August 15	9:00 p.m.	New York	@	Las Vegas	Amazon Prime Video	82–63	Johannès (17)	J. Jones (15)	Vandersloot (10)	Michelob Ultra Arena; 8,967
Thursday, August 17	10:00 p.m.	New York	@	Las Vegas	Amazon Prime Video	75–88	Tied (22)	C. Gray (11)	C. Gray (11)	Michelob Ultra Arena; 9,230
Friday, August 18
Friday, August 18	7:00 p.m.	Dallas	@	Connecticut	ION	95–75	Ogunbowale (30)	Bonner (12)	A. Thomas (7)	Mohegan Sun Arena; 6,584
Friday, August 18	7:00 p.m.	Washington	@	Indiana	ION	83–79	Sykes (30)	Boston (10)	K. Mitchell (7)	Gainbridge Fieldhouse; 3,506
Friday, August 18	7:30 p.m.	Chicago	@	Atlanta	ION	67–78	Ch. Parker (29)	A. Smith (12)	Tied (7)	Gateway Center Arena; 2,957
Friday, August 18	10:00 p.m.	New York	@	Phoenix	ION	85–63	Laney (22)	Tied (8)	Vandersloot (8)	Footprint Center; 9,652
Friday, August 18	10:00 p.m.	Minnesota	@	Seattle	ION	78–70	N. Collier (24)	Juhász (12)	3 tied (4)	Climate Pledge Arena; 8,865
Saturday, August 19	3:00 p.m.	Los Angeles	@	Las Vegas	USA: ABC; Canada: TSN4	78–72	Wilson (25)	N. Ogwumike (11)	C. Gray (7)	Michelob Ultra Arena; 10,348
Sunday, August 20
Sunday, August 20	3:00 p.m.	Dallas	@	Washington	USA: NBA TV; Canada: NBA TV Canada	97–84	Cloud (22)	McCowan (13)	S. Sabally (10)	Entertainment and Sports Arena; 4,200
Sunday, August 20	5:00 p.m.	Connecticut	@	Chicago	USA: NBA TV; Canada: NBA TV Canada	79–73	A. Thomas (22)	R. Allen (9)	A. Thomas (8)	Wintrust Arena; 6,901
Sunday, August 20	6:00 p.m.	Indiana	@	Phoenix	League Pass, Meta (VR)	83–73	K. Mitchell (28)	N. Smith (11)	Berger (5)	Footprint Center; 11,807
Sunday, August 20	7:00 p.m.	Seattle	@	Minnesota	USA: NBA TV; Canada: NBA TV Canada	88–74	Loyd (31)	Mendjiadeu (15)	D. Miller (6)	Target Center; 6,525
Tuesday, August 22
Tuesday, August 22	7:00 p.m.	Las Vegas	@	Atlanta	CBS Sports Network	112–110	Wilson (53)	C. Gray (9)	C. Gray (12)	Gateway Center Arena; 3,209
Tuesday, August 22	7:00 p.m.	Connecticut	@	Washington	USA: NBA TV; Canada: NBA TV Canada	68–64	A. Thomas (24)	A. Thomas (10)	Tied (5)	Entertainment and Sports Arena; 3,058
Tuesday, August 22	8:00 p.m.	Seattle	@	Chicago	USA: League Pass; Canada: TSN1/4	79–102	Loyd (26)	Horston (11)	Evans (8)	Wintrust Arena; 4,822
Tuesday, August 22	8:00 p.m.	Dallas	@	Minnesota	Twitter, Meta (VR)	86–91	N. Collier (29)	McCowan (16)	3 tied (7)	Target Center; 6,921
Wednesday, August 23	10:00 p.m.	Phoenix	@	Los Angeles	CBS Sports Network	62–91	Stevens (20)	Stevens (9)	Canada (7)	Crypto.com Arena; 3,469
Thursday, August 24
Thursday, August 24	7:00 p.m.	New York	@	Connecticut	Amazon Prime Video	95–90 (OT)	Bonner (30)	J. Jones (14)	A. Thomas (12)	Mohegan Sun Arena; 9,168
Thursday, August 24	7:00 p.m.	Seattle	@	Indiana	Twitter, Meta (VR)	86–90	K. Mitchell (36)	Magbegor (13)	Wallace (5)	Gainbridge Fieldhouse; 2,644
Thursday, August 24	8:00 p.m.	Las Vegas	@	Chicago	USA: NBA TV; Canada: SN360	94–87	Young	Tied (10)	C. Gray (10)	Wintrust Arena; 8,084
Thursday, August 24	8:00 p.m.	Minnesota	@	Dallas	League Pass	90–81	N. Collier (25)	McCowan (18)	T. Mitchell (7)	College Park Center; 3,931
Friday, August 25	8:00 p.m.	Los Angeles	@	Atlanta	ION	83–78	N. Ogwumike (29)	N. Ogwumike (12)	Canada (9)	Gateway Center Arena; 2,957
Saturday, August 26	7:00 p.m.	Las Vegas	@	Washington	USA: NBA TV; Canada: NBA TV Canada	62–78	Tied (21)	Wilson (11)	Cloud (9)	Entertainment and Sports Arena; 4,200
Saturday, August 26	8:00 p.m.	New York	@	Minnesota	League Pass, Meta (VR)	111–76	Stewart (38)	Stewart (11)	Vandersloot (9)	Target Center; 7,101
Sunday, August 27
Sunday, August 27	1:00 p.m.	Los Angeles	@	Connecticut	CBS Sports Network	68–83	Tied (17)	Nelson-Ododa (11)	A. Thomas (8)	Mohegan Sun Arena; 6,783
Sunday, August 27	4:00 p.m.	Atlanta	@	Indiana	USA: NBA TV; Canada: NBA TV Canada	80–83	Ch. Parker (24)	N. Smith (13)	K. Mitchell (6)	Gainbridge Fieldhouse; 4,034
Sunday, August 27	6:00 p.m.	Dallas	@	Phoenix	USA: NBA TV; Canada: NBA TV Canada	77–74	Ogunbowale (29)	Turner (10)	Jefferson (5)	Footprint Center; 12,163
Sunday, August 27	6:00 p.m.	Chicago	@	Seattle	League Pass	90–85	E. Williams (23)	Magbegor (14)	3 tied (6)	Climate Pledge Arena; 9,893
Monday, August 28	7:00 p.m.	Las Vegas	@	New York	USA: ESPN2; Canada: TSN4/5	85–94	Ionescu (25)	Stewart (12)	Vandersloot (10)	Barclays Center; 11,615
Tuesday, August 29
Tuesday, August 29	7:00 p.m.	Phoenix	@	Atlanta	CBS Sports Network	76–94	Ch. Parker (25)	3 tied (7)	Jefferson (9)	Gateway Center Arena; 2,785
Tuesday, August 29	7:00 p.m.	Minnesota	@	Washington	USA: NBA TV; Canada: NBA TV Canada	72–83	Miller (25)	N. Collier (10)	Cloud (9)	Entertainment and Sports Arena; 3,708
Tuesday, August 29	10:00 p.m.	Chicago	@	Los Angeles	CBS Sports Network	76–75	Copper (22)	N. Ogwumike (11)	Canada (9)	Crypto.com Arena; 6,041
Thursday, August 31
Thursday, August 31	7:00 p.m.	Phoenix	@	Connecticut	Amazon Prime Video	74–84	Tied (18)	A. Thomas (13)	A. Thomas (8)	Mohegan Sun Arena; 7,794
Thursday, August 31	10:00 p.m.	Washington	@	Las Vegas	Amazon Prime Video	75–84	Wilson (26)	Wilson (11)	Plum (10)	Michelob Ultra Arena; 8,619
Thursday, August 31	10:00 p.m.	Seattle	@	Los Angeles	USA: League Pass; Canada: SN1	72–61	Loyd (25)	Tied (8)	Loyd (7)	Crypto.com Arena; 6,101

September

Date	Time (ET)	Matchup			TV	Result	High points	High rebounds	High assists	Location
Friday, September 1
Friday, September 1	7:00 p.m.	Dallas	@	Indiana	ION	110–100	S. Sabally (40)	Tied (11)	Wheeler (10)	Gainbridge Fieldhouse; 3,137
Friday, September 1	8:00 p.m.	Connecticut	@	New York	ION	58–89	Laney (19)	Stewart (10)	Stewart (7)	Barclays Center; 8,276
Friday, September 1	8:00 p.m.	Atlanta	@	Minnesota	ION	85–91 (OT)	N. Collier (27)	N. Collier (17)	3 tied (6)	Target Center; 7,114
Saturday, September 2	9:00 p.m.	Seattle	@	Las Vegas	USA: NBA TV; Canada: NBA TV Canada	77–103	Wilson (30)	Stokes (11)	C. Gray (9)	Michelob Ultra Arena; 9,319
Sunday, September 3
Sunday, September 3	3:00 p.m.	New York	@	Chicago	USA: ESPN2; Canada: TSN3/5	86–69	Stewart (26)	Stewart (14)	Vandersloot (10)	Wintrust Arena; 8,223
Sunday, September 3	4:00 p.m.	Indiana	@	Dallas	ESPN3	97–84 (OT)	Tied (30)	Boston (11)	Wheeler (11)	College Park Center; 5,058
Sunday, September 3	7:00 p.m.	Phoenix	@	Minnesota	USA: NBA TV; Canada: SN360	73–86	Jefferson (32)	N. Collier (16)	Juhász (8)	Target Center; 7,314
Sunday, September 3	7:30 p.m.	Washington	@	Los Angeles	League Pass	64–72	Clarendon (15)	Hamby (10)	Cloud (5)	Crypto.com Arena; 2,550
Tuesday, September 5
Tuesday, September 5	7:00 p.m.	Los Angeles	@	Connecticut	Twitter	76–90	A. Thomas (27)	A. Thomas (12)	A. Thomas (14)	Mohegan Sun Arena; 4,783
Tuesday, September 5	7:00 p.m.	Chicago	@	Indiana	USA: NBA TV; Canada: NBA TV Canada	96–69	Copper (25)	C. Williams (8)	Tied (6)	Gainbridge Fieldhouse; 2,450
Tuesday, September 5	8:00 p.m.	New York	@	Dallas	CBS Sports Network	94–93	Stewart (40)	McCowan (12)	Vandersloot (10)	College Park Center; 4,195
Tuesday, September 5	10:00 p.m.	Washington	@	Phoenix	CBS Sports Network	100–77	Delle Donne (24)	Hines-Allen (8)	Cloud (10)	Footprint Center; 7,038
Wednesday, September 6	7:00 p.m.	Seattle	@	Atlanta	USA: NBA TV; Canada: NBA TV Canada	68–79	Loyd (26)	Billings (14)	Tied (7)	Gateway Center Arena; 2,731
Thursday, September 7	7:00 p.m.	Los Angeles	@	New York	Amazon Prime Video	89–96	Clarendon (30)	J. Jones (9)	Vandersloot (10)	Barclays Center; 6,275
Friday, September 8
Friday, September 8	7:00 p.m.	Indiana	@	Connecticut	ION	59–76	K. Mitchell (15)	A. Thomas (14)	A. Thomas (8)	Mohegan Sun Arena; 5,064
Friday, September 8	7:00 p.m.	Atlanta	@	Washington	ION	80–75	Sykes (27)	R. Howard (12)	Cloud (15)	Entertainment and Sports Arena; 4,210
Friday, September 8	8:00 p.m.	Minnesota	@	Chicago	ION	87–92	N. Collier (28)	Tied (10)	C. Williams (11)	Wintrust Arena; 7,994
Friday, September 8	8:00 p.m.	Seattle	@	Dallas	ION	91–106	Loyd (33)	Magbegor (9)	Ogunbowale (10)	College Park Center; 4,546
Friday, September 8	10:00 p.m.	Las Vegas	@	Phoenix	ION	94–73	Wilson (30)	Sutton (11)	C. Gray (12)	Footprint Center; 13,206
Sunday, September 10
Sunday, September 10	1:00 p.m.	Dallas	@	Atlanta	League Pass	94–77	Ogunbowale (32)	McCowan (10)	S. Sabally (5)	Gateway Center Arena; 3,207
Sunday, September 10	1:00 p.m.	Chicago	@	Connecticut	CBS Sports Network	102–91 (OT)	C. Williams (23)	C. Williams (16)	C. Williams (13)	Mohegan Sun Arena; 6,377
Sunday, September 10	1:00 p.m.	Minnesota	@	Indiana	USA: League Pass; Canada: TSN4	72–87	Tied (24)	Boston (12)	3 tied (3)	Gainbridge Fieldhouse; 4,009
Sunday, September 10	1:00 p.m.	Washington	@	New York	USA: NBA TV; Canada: SN360	90–88	Tied (20)	J. Jones (9)	Ionescu (7)	Barclays Center; 8,306
Sunday, September 10	3:00 p.m.	Phoenix	@	Las Vegas	USA: ESPN2; Canada: NBA TV Canada	85–100	Wilson (36)	Wilson (8)	C. Gray (8)	T-Mobile Arena; 17,406
Sunday, September 10	3:00 p.m.	Los Angeles	@	Seattle	ESPN3	91–89	Loyd (28)	Hamby (12)	Tied (7)	Climate Pledge Arena; 10,728

2023 WNBA playoffs
Round One

Date	Time (ET)	Matchup			TV	Result	High points	High rebounds	High assists	Location
Wednesday, September 13	8:00 p.m.	Minnesota	@	Connecticut	USA: ESPN2; Canada: TSN4/5	60–90	Bonner (17)	Bonner (15)	A. Thomas (10)	Mohegan Sun Arena; 5,056
Wednesday, September 13	10:00 p.m.	Chicago	@	Las Vegas	USA: ESPN; Canada: SN360	59–87	C. Gray (20)	Stokes (15)	C. Gray (7)	T-Mobile Arena; 12,927
Friday, September 15	7:30 p.m.	Washington	@	New York	USA: ESPN2; Canada: NBA TV Canada	90–75	Ionescu (29)	J. Jones (12)	Cloud (8)	Barclays Center; 8,789
Friday, September 15	9:30 p.m.	Atlanta	@	Dallas	USA: ESPN2; Canada: NBA TV Canada	82–94	R. Howard (36)	McCowan (14)	Ogunbowale (7)	College Park Center; 5,053
Sunday, September 17	1:00 p.m.	Minnesota	@	Connecticut	USA: ESPN; Canada: SN360	82–75	McBride (28)	N. Collier (13)	Tied (6)	Mohegan Sun Arena; 6,673
Sunday, September 17	3:00 p.m.	Chicago	@	Las Vegas	USA: ABC; Canada: NBA TV Canada	70–92	Wilson (38)	Wilson (16)	C. Gray (9)	Michelob Ultra Arena; 9,000
Tuesday, September 19	7:00 p.m.	Washington	@	New York	USA: ESPN; Canada: TSN4	85–90 (OT)	Cloud (33)	J. Jones (14)	Vandersloot (10)	Barclays Center; 9,256
Tuesday, September 19	9:00 p.m.	Atlanta	@	Dallas	USA: ESPN; Canada: NBA TV Canada	74–101	R. Howard (21)	McCowan (16)	Ogunbowale (7)	College Park Center; 4,798
Wednesday, September 20	8:00 p.m.	Connecticut	@	Minnesota	USA: ESPN; Canada: NBA TV Canada	90–75	N. Collier (31)	Bonner (10)	A. Thomas (12)	Target Center; 8,724

Semifinals

Date	Time (ET)	Matchup			TV	Result	High points	High rebounds	High assists	Location
Sunday, September 24	1:00 p.m.	Connecticut	@	New York	USA: ESPN; Canada: NBA TV Canada	78–63	Bonner (20)	J. Jones (11)	A. Thomas (10)	Barclays Center; 9,442
Sunday, September 24	5:00 p.m.	Dallas	@	Las Vegas	USA: ESPN2; Canada: SN360	83–97	Wilson (34)	Young (10)	Tied (7)	Michelob Ultra Arena; 9,784
Tuesday, September 26	8:00 p.m.	Connecticut	@	New York	USA: ESPN; Canada: NBA TV Canada	77–84	Hayes (30)	J. Jones (13)	A. Thomas (9)	Barclays Center; 10,009
Tuesday, September 26	10:00 p.m.	Dallas	@	Las Vegas	USA: ESPN; Canada: TSN4	84–91	Wilson (30)	Wilson (11)	C. Gray (8)	Michelob Ultra Arena; 9,286
Friday, September 29	7:30 p.m.	New York	@	Connecticut	USA: ESPN2; Canada: NBA TV Canada	92–81	Stewart (25)	J. Jones (12)	A. Thomas (14)	Mohegan Sun Arena; 9,162
Friday, September 29	9:30 p.m.	Las Vegas	@	Dallas	USA: ESPN2; Canada: NBA TV Canada	64–61	Ogunbowale (18)	McCowan (15)	Plum (7)	College Park Center; 6,251
Sunday, October 1	3:00 p.m.	New York	@	Connecticut	USA: ABC; Canada: NBA TV Canada	87–84	Stewart (27)	Tied (15)	A. Thomas (11)	Mohegan Sun Arena; 8,196

WNBA Finals

Date	Time (ET)	Matchup			TV	Result	High points	High rebounds	High assists	Location
Sunday, October 8	3:00 p.m.	New York	@	Las Vegas	USA: ABC; Canada: SN1	82–99	Tied (26)	J. Jones (10)	C. Gray (9)	Michelob Ultra Arena; 10,300
Wednesday, October 11	9:00 p.m.	New York	@	Las Vegas	USA: ESPN; Canada: TSN1/4/5	76–104	Wilson (26)	Wilson (15)	C. Gray (11)	Michelob Ultra Arena; 10,232
Sunday, October 15	3:00 p.m.	Las Vegas	@	New York	USA: ABC; Canada: SN1	73–87	Plum (29)	Stewart (12)	Ionescu (11)	Barclays Center; 17,143
Wednesday, October 18	8:00 p.m.	Las Vegas	@	New York	USA: ESPN; Canada: TSN1/3/4/5	70–69	Wilson (24)	Wilson (16)	Young (7)	Barclays Center; 16,851

Note: Games highlighted in ██ represent Commissioner's Cup games.
All times Eastern

=== Statistical leaders ===
The following shows the leaders in each statistical category during the 2023 regular season.

Category	Player	Team	Statistic
Points per game	Jewell Loyd	Seattle Storm	24.7 ppg
Rebounds per game	Alyssa Thomas	Connecticut Sun	9.9 rpg
Assists per game	Courtney Vandersloot	New York Liberty	8.1 apg
Steals per game	Jordin Canada	Los Angeles Sparks	2.3 spg
Blocks per game	A'ja Wilson	Las Vegas Aces	2.2 bpg
Field goal percentage	Aliyah Boston	Indiana Fever	57.8%
Three point FG percentage	Tyasha Harris	Connecticut Sun	46.4%
Free throw percentage	Elena Delle Donne	Washington Mystics	93.8%
Points per game (team)	Las Vegas Aces		92.8 ppg
Field goal percentage (team)	Las Vegas Aces		48.6%

== Playoffs ==
**First round** Best-of-3
**1**	**Las Vegas Aces**	**2**
8	Chicago Sky	0
**4**	**Dallas Wings**	**2**
5	Atlanta Dream	0
**2**	**New York Liberty**	**2**
7	Washington Mystics	0
**3**	**Connecticut Sun**	**2**
6	Minnesota Lynx	1

**Semifinals**; Best-of-5
**1**	**Las Vegas Aces**	**3**
4	Dallas Wings	0
**2**	**New York Liberty**	**3**
3	Connecticut Sun	1

**Finals**; Best-of-5
1	**Las Vegas Aces**	**3**
2	New York Liberty	1

- **Bold** – Series winner
- Italic – Team with home-court advantage

== Awards ==
=== Individual ===
Award		Winner	Team	Position	Votes/Statistic
Most Valuable Player (MVP)		Breanna Stewart	New York Liberty	Forward	20 out of 60 (Note: Second-place finisher Alyssa Thomas received more first-place votes (23 to 20), but Stewart earned 446 total points to Thomas' 439.)
Finals MVP		A'ja Wilson	Las Vegas Aces	Forward	
Rookie of the Year		Aliyah Boston	Indiana Fever	Forward	60 out of 60
Most Improved Player		Satou Sabally	Dallas Wings	Forward	37 out of 60
Defensive Player of the Year		A'ja Wilson	Las Vegas Aces	Forward	32 out of 60
Sixth Player of the Year		Alysha Clark	Las Vegas Aces	Forward	35 out of 60
Kim Perrot Sportsmanship Award		Elizabeth Williams	Chicago Sky	Center	15 out of 60
Season-Long Community Assist Award		Brittney Griner	Phoenix Mercury	Center	
Peak Performers	**Points**	Jewell Loyd	Seattle Storm	Guard	24.7 ppg
Peak Performers	**Rebounds**	Alyssa Thomas	Connecticut Sun	Forward	9.9 rpg
Peak Performers	**Assists**	Courtney Vandersloot	New York Liberty	Guard	8.1 apg
Coach of the Year		Stephanie White	Connecticut Sun	Coach	36 out of 60
Basketball Executive of the Year		Jonathan Kolb	New York Liberty	General manager	20 points (6 out of 11 first-place votes)

=== Team ===
On August 30, shortly before the end of the regular season, the WNBA announced that it would adopt a "positionless" format for the All-Defensive Team, mirroring its adoption of a positionless format for the All-WNBA Team in 2022.

Award		Members				
**All-WNBA First Team**	**First Team**	Breanna Stewart (F)	Alyssa Thomas (F)	A'ja Wilson (F)	Napheesa Collier (F)	Satou Sabally (F)
**All-WNBA First Team**	**Second Team**	Nneka Ogwumike (F)	Jackie Young (G)	Chelsea Gray (G)	Jewell Loyd (G)	Sabrina Ionescu (G)
**All-Defensive First Team**	**First Team**	A'ja Wilson (F)	Alyssa Thomas (F)	Brittney Sykes (G)	Breanna Stewart (F)	Jordin Canada (G)
**All-Defensive First Team**	**Second Team**	Betnijah Laney (G/F)	Ezi Magbegor (C)	Nneka Ogwumike (F)	Napheesa Collier (F)	Elizabeth Williams (C)
**All-Rookie Team**		Aliyah Boston (F/C)	Jordan Horston (F)	Dorka Juhász (F)	Diamond Miller (F)	Li Meng (G)

=== Players of the Week ===
Date Awarded	Eastern Conference		Western Conference		Reference
Date Awarded	Player	Team	Player	Team	Reference
May 30	Breanna Stewart	New York Liberty	Arike Ogunbowale	Dallas Wings	
June 6	Alyssa Thomas	Connecticut Sun	Nneka Ogwumike	Los Angeles Sparks	
June 13	Breanna Stewart (2)	New York Liberty	Satou Sabally	Dallas Wings	
June 20	Aliyah Boston	Indiana Fever	Jewell Loyd	Seattle Storm	
June 27	Alyssa Thomas (2)	Connecticut Sun	A'ja Wilson	Las Vegas Aces	
July 5	Courtney Williams	Chicago Sky	Napheesa Collier	Minnesota Lynx	
July 13	Breanna Stewart (3)	New York Liberty	Natasha Howard	Dallas Wings	
July 25	Jonquel Jones	New York Liberty	A'ja Wilson (2)	Las Vegas Aces	
August 1	Breanna Stewart (4)	New York Liberty	Chelsea Gray	Las Vegas Aces	
August 8	Alyssa Thomas (3)	Connecticut Sun	Diana Taurasi	Phoenix Mercury	
August 15	Breanna Stewart (5)	New York Liberty	A'ja Wilson (4)	Las Vegas Aces	
August 29	Kelsey Mitchell	Indiana Fever	A'ja Wilson (4)	Las Vegas Aces	
September 4	Breanna Stewart (6)	New York Liberty	Napheesa Collier (2)	Minnesota Lynx	

=== Players of the Month ===
Month	Eastern Conference		Western Conference		Reference
Month	Player	Team	Player	Team	Reference
May	Breanna Stewart	New York Liberty	Arike Ogunbowale	Dallas Wings	
June	Alyssa Thomas	Connecticut Sun	A'ja Wilson (3)	Las Vegas Aces	
July	Breanna Stewart (3)	New York Liberty	A'ja Wilson (3)	Las Vegas Aces	
August	Breanna Stewart (3)	New York Liberty	A'ja Wilson (3)	Las Vegas Aces	

=== Rookies of the Month ===
Month	Player	Team	Reference
May	Aliyah Boston (2)	Indiana Fever	
June	Aliyah Boston (2)	Indiana Fever	
July	Diamond Miller	Minnesota Lynx	
August	Aliyah Boston (3)	Indiana Fever	

=== Coaches of the Month ===
Month	Coach	Team	Reference
May	Stephanie White	Connecticut Sun	
June	Becky Hammon	Las Vegas Aces	
July	Tanisha Wright	Atlanta Dream	
August	Sandy Brondello	New York Liberty	

== Coaches ==
=== Eastern Conference ===
Team	Head coach	Previous job	Years with team	Record with team	Playoff Appearances	Finals Appearances	WNBA Championships
Atlanta Dream	Tanisha Wright	Las Vegas Aces (assistant)	1	14–22	0	0	0
Chicago Sky	James Wade	UMMC Ekaterinburg (assistant)	4	74–50	4	1	1
Connecticut Sun	Stephanie White	Vanderbilt	0	0–0	0	0	0
Indiana Fever	Christie Sides	Atlanta Dream (assistant)	0	0–0	0	0	0
New York Liberty	Sandy Brondello	Phoenix Mercury	1	16–20	1	0	0
Washington Mystics	Eric Thibault	Washington Mystics (associate HC)	0	0–0	0	0	0

=== Western Conference ===
Team	Head coach	Previous job	Years with team	Record with team	Playoff Appearances	Finals Appearances	WNBA Championships
Dallas Wings	Latricia Trammell	Los Angeles Sparks (assistant)	0	0–0	0	0	0
Las Vegas Aces	Becky Hammon	San Antonio Spurs (assistant)	1	26–10	1	1	1
Los Angeles Sparks	Curt Miller	Connecticut Sun	0	0–0	0	0	0
Minnesota Lynx	Cheryl Reeve	Detroit Shock (assistant)	13	281–149	11	6	4
Phoenix Mercury	Vanessa Nygaard	Las Vegas Aces (assistant)	1	15–21	1	0	0
Seattle Storm	Noelle Quinn	Seattle Storm (associate head coach)	2	38–24	2	0	0

Notes:

- Year with team does not include 2023 season.
- Records are from time at current team and are through the end of the 2022 regular season.
- Playoff appearances are from time at current team only.
- WNBA Finals and Championships do not include time with other teams.
- Coaches shown are the coaches who began the 2023 season as head coach of each team.
