= 2023 WNBA Commissioner's Cup =

WNBA Commissioner's Cup

2023 WNBA Commissioner's Cup Game
Cup Final
New York Liberty	Las Vegas Aces
(7-3)	(9-1)
82	63
Head coach: Sandy Brondello	Head coach: Becky Hammon
	1	2	3	4	Total
New York Liberty	17	15	24	26	82
Las Vegas Aces	11	23	14	15	63
- Date: August 15, 2023
- Venue: Michelob Ultra Arena, Las Vegas
- MVP: Jonquel Jones (New York)
- Referees: Roy Gulbeyan, Eric Brewton, Isaac Barnett
- Attendance: 8,967

United States TV coverage
- Network: Amazon Prime
- Announcers: Sarah Kustok; Michael Grady; Baron Davis

The 2023 WNBA Commissioner's Cup presented by Coinbase was the WNBA's third Commissioner's Cup in league history. The Cup Final featured the top Eastern Conference Cup team facing off against the top Western Conference team. The home team was decided by the team with the highest winning percentage in Cup Play.

The New York Liberty faced off against the Las Vegas Aces and won 82-63 on August 15, 2023 to claim their first Commissioner's Cup title. Jonquel Jones was named Cup MVP after scoring 16 points and grabbing 15 rebounds.

== Road to the Cup Final ==
The Commissioner's Cup starts by designating a portion of regular-season games – 10 games per team – as counting toward Cup play. The team from each conference with the top record in designated “Cup games” then compete for the Commissioner's Cup title and a special prize pool. Cup games are the first home game and first road game each team plays against its five conference rivals.

=== Standings ===
Eastern Conference
Pos	Team	Pld	W	L
1	New York Liberty (Note: New York will represent the Eastern Conference due to their head-to-head record against Connecticut. The Liberty went 2-0 against the Sun.)	10	7	3
2	Connecticut Sun	10	7	3
3	Atlanta Dream	10	6	4
4	Washington Mystics	10	5	5
5	Chicago Sky	10	3	7
6	Indiana Fever	10	2	8

Notes:

Western Conference
Pos	Team	Pld	W	L
1	Las Vegas Aces	10	9	1
2	Dallas Wings	10	6	4
3	Minnesota Lynx	10	5	5
4	Los Angeles Sparks	10	5	5
5	Seattle Storm	10	4	6
6	Phoenix Mercury	10	1	9

== Funding to Local Non-Profits ==
Each team selects a charity of their choice to represent, and support thought the Commissioner's Cup series. Throughout the season, every Commissioner's Cup game win will result in $2,000 for the charity and every loss will result in $500 to their chosen organization.

Team	Charity
Atlanta Dream	Helping Mamas
Chicago Sky	Sister Afya Community Care
Connecticut Sun	#Day43 Black Maternal Health Awareness
Dallas Wings	Sisters Network Dallas
Indiana Fever	Wheeler Mission
Las Vegas Aces	NAMI Southern Nevada
Los Angeles Sparks	California Women's Law Center
Minnesota Lynx	African American Breast Cancer Alliance
New York Liberty	Callen-Lorde
Phoenix Mercury	Phoenix Birth Foundation
Seattle Storm	Therapy Fund Foundation
Washington Mystics	MedStar Health Safe Babies. Safe Moms.

== Game Summary ==
Amazon Prime

August 15
18:00 PDT

Boxscore

New York Liberty 82, Las Vegas Aces 63
Scoring by quarter: 17-11, 15-23, 24-14, 26-15
Pts: Marine Johannès (17); Rebs: Jonquel Jones (15); Asts: Courtney Vandersloot (10)	Pts: Jackie Young (16); Rebs: Kiah Stokes; Chelsea Gray (6); Asts: Kelsey Plum (6)

Michelob Ultra Arena
Attendance: 8,967
Referees: Roy Gulbeyan. Eric Brewton. Isaac Barnett

== Team rosters ==
2023 New York Liberty roster
Players
Coaches

Pos.	No.	Nat.	Name	Height	Weight	DOB	From	Yrs
C	31	(United States)	Dolson, Stefanie	6' 5" (1.96m)	235 lb (107kg)	1992-01-08	Connecticut	9
G	20	(United States)	Ionescu, Sabrina	5' 11" (1.8m)	165 lb (75kg)	1997-12-06	Oregon	3
G	23	(France)	Johannès, Marine	5' 10" (1.78m)	134 lb (61kg)	1995-01-21	France	2
F/C	35	(Bosnia and Herzegovina)	Jones, Jonquel	6' 6" (1.98m)	215 lb (98kg)	1994-01-05	George Washington	6
G/F	44	(United States)	Laney, Betnijah	6' 0" (1.83m)	166 lb (75kg)	1993-10-29	Rutgers	7
F	8	(Germany)	Sabally, Nyara	6' 5" (1.96m)	204 lb (93kg)	2000-02-26	Oregon	1
F	30	(United States)	Stewart, Breanna	6' 4" (1.93m)	170 lb (77kg)	1994-08-27	Connecticut	6
F	5	(United States)	Thornton, Kayla	6' 1" (1.85m)	188 lb (85kg)	1992-10-20	UTEP	7
G	22	(Hungary)	Vandersloot, Courtney	5' 8" (1.73m)	137 lb (62kg)	1989-02-08	Gonzaga	12
G/F	13	(United States)	Willoughby, Jocelyn	6' 0" (1.83m)	180 lb (82kg)	1998-03-25	Virginia	2
C	21	(China)	Xu, Han	6' 10" (2.08m)	193 lb (88kg)	1999-10-31	China	2

Head coach
(Australia) Sandy Brondello (Western Sydney)
Assistant coaches
(Germany) Olaf Lange
(United States) Roneeka Hodges (Florida State)
(United States) Zach O'Brien (Saint Joseph's College of Maine)
Athletic trainer
(United States) Terri Acosta
Strength and conditioning coach
(United States) Emily Zaler

Legend

- (C) Team captain
- (DP) Unsigned draft pick
- (FA) Free agent
- (S) Suspended
- Injured

=== Depth ===
Pos.	Starter	Bench
PG	Courtney Vandersloot
SG	Sabrina Ionescu	Marine Johannès
SF	Betnijah Laney	Kayla Thornton; Jocelyn Willoughby
PF	Breanna Stewart	Nyara Sabally
C	Jonquel Jones	Stefanie Dolson; Han Xu

2023 Las Vegas Aces roster
Players
Coaches

Pos.	No.	Nat.	Name	Height	Weight	DOB	From	Yrs
F	1	(United States)	Bell, Kierstan	6' 1" (1.85m)	176 lb (80kg)	2000-03-16	Florida Gulf Coast	1
F	7	(Israel)	Clark, Alysha	5' 11" (1.8m)	167 lb (76kg)	1987-07-07	Middle Tennessee	10
C	81	(United States)	Coates, Alaina	6' 4" (1.93m)	225 lb (102kg)	1995-04-07	South Carolina	4
G	51	(United States)	Colson, Sydney	5' 8" (1.73m)	140 lb (64kg)	1989-08-06	Texas A&M	8
F/C	13	(Australia)	George, Cayla	6' 4" (1.93m)	192 lb (87kg)	1989-05-01	Australia	3
G	12	(United States)	Gray, Chelsea	5' 11" (1.8m)	170 lb (77kg)	1992-10-08	Duke	8
F/C	3	(United States)	Parker, Candace (injured)	6' 4" (1.93m)	184 lb (83kg)	1986-04-19	Tennessee	15
G	10	(United States)	Plum, Kelsey	5' 8" (1.73m)	145 lb (66kg)	1994-08-24	Washington	5
C	41	(Turkey)	Stokes, Kiah	6' 3" (1.91m)	191 lb (87kg)	1993-03-30	Connecticut	7
G	2	(United States)	Williams, Riquna	5' 6" (1.68m)	165 lb (75kg)	1990-05-28	Miami (FL)	10
F	22	(United States)	Wilson, A'ja	6' 4" (1.93m)	195 lb (88kg)	1996-08-08	South Carolina	5
G	0	(United States)	Young, Jackie	6' 0" (1.83m)	165 lb (75kg)	1997-09-16	Notre Dame	4

Head coach
(United States) Becky Hammon (Colorado State)
Assistant coaches
(United States) Natalie Nakase (UCLA)
(United States) Tyler Marsh (Birmingham–Southern)
(United States) Charlene Thomas-Swinson (Auburn)
Athletic trainer
(United States) Michelle Anumba (Duke)

Legend

- (C) Team captain
- (DP) Unsigned draft pick
- (FA) Free agent
- (S) Suspended
- Injured

=== Depth chart ===
Pos.	Starter	Bench
PG	Chelsea Gray	Sydney Colson
SG	Kelsey Plum	Riquna Williams
SF	Jackie Young	Alysha Clark; Kierstan Bell
PF	Candace Parker	Cayla George
C	A'ja Wilson	Kiah Stokes
