= 2023 Atlanta Dream season =

- Head coach: Tanisha Wright
- Arena: Gateway Center Arena

Results
- Record: 19–21 (.475)
- Place: T-3rd (Eastern)
- Playoff finish: 5th seed; Lost 1st Round 0–2 to Dallas

The 2023 Atlanta Dream season was the 16th season for the Atlanta Dream of the Women's National Basketball Association, and their second season under head coach Tanisha Wright.

The Dream secured the third overall pick in the 2023 WNBA draft in the 2023 Draft Lottery. They entered the lottery with the 2nd best odds to get the first overall pick.

Former assistant coach Christie Sides from the 2022 season left the team in the offseason after she was named the new head coach of the Indiana Fever.

The Dream alternated losses and wins to begin the season and finished May with a 2–2 overall record. The pattern did not carry over into June where the team lost its first three games of the month. However, fortunes turned as the Dream won their next three. Again, the team was streaky, and lost their next three games. They won the final game of the month to finish with a 4–6 record in June. The Dream carried that momentum into July as they won six straight games to start the month, and extended their winning streak to seven games. They lost two games back to back against Connecticut but won two of their last three in the month to finish July 8–3. The Dream's good form did not carry over into August as they lost their first two games of the month. They did pick up a win before losing their next three. After stopping that losing streak with a win against Chicago, the Dream lost their next three games before ending the month with a win. A 3–8 August record left them in the hunt for a playoff spot entering the final month. They started September with an overtime loss against Minnesota before winning their next two games. The first of those wins secured them a playoff spot. They lost the final game of the regular season and finished in a three-way tie for fifth place. They finished September with a 2–2 record, which made their season record 19–21.

The Dream won the tiebreakers over both Minnesota and Washington. The tiebreaker was combined regular season record, where the Dream were 5–2. The Dream earned the fifth seed for the playoffs, which meant they would face off against the fourth seed Dallas Wings. In the first game, in Dallas, the Dream kept the game close, but ultimately came up short losing 82–94. The second game in Dallas was not as close and the Dream lost 74–101 to end their season. Their nineteen regular season wins were their highest total since 2018 and their playoff qualification was only their second in the last eight years.

== Transactions ==
=== WNBA draft ===
Round	Pick	Player	Nationality	School/Team/Country
1	6	Haley Jones	United States	Stanford
1	8	Laeticia Amihere	Canada	South Carolina
2	15	Leigha Brown	United States	Michigan

=== Transactions ===
Date	Transaction
December 20, 2022	Extended Head Coach Tanisha Wright and General Manager Dan Padover to 5 Year Extensions
January 13, 2023	Extended Qualifying Offers to AD Durr and Beatrice Mompremier
January 13, 2023	Traded Kristy Wallace to the Indiana Fever in exchange for Danielle Robinson
January 21, 2023	Traded the #3 Overall Pick in the 2023 WNBA draft and a First-Round Pick in 2025 to the Dallas Wings in exchange for Allisha Gray
February 1, 2023	Signed Nia Coffey and AD Durr
February 3, 2023	Signed Monique Billings
February 9, 2023	Traded Tiffany Hayes to the Connecticut Sun in exchange for the 6th Overall Pick in the 2023 WNBA draft
February 9, 2023	Hired Vickie Johnson as Assistant Coach
February 11, 2023	Claimed and Awarded Iliana Rupert of a Waivers
February 21, 2023	Signed Beatrice Mompremier to the Qualifying Offer - Training Camp Contract
February 24, 2023	Exercised 4th-Year Team Option on Aari McDonald
March 3, 2023	Signed Mikayla Pivec to a Training Camp Contract
March 7, 2023	Signed Allisha Gray to a Contract Extension
March 8, 2023	Signed Lorela Cubaj to a Training Camp Contract
March 9, 2023	Signed Cheyenne Parker to a Contract Extension
April 13, 2023	Signed Laeticia Amihere to a Rookie Scale Contract
April 17, 2023	Waived Beatrice Mompremier
April 18, 2023	Signed Haley Jones and Leigha Brown to Rookie Scale Contracts
April 20, 2023	Signed Alaina Coates to a Training Camp Contract
May 5, 2023	Waived Alaina Coates and Mikayla Pivec
May 16, 2023	Traded Leigha Brown to the Connecticut Sun in exchange for a 2025 third-round pick
May 18, 2023	Temporarily suspended the contract of Iliana Rupert due to Overseas Commitments
June 3, 2023	Waived Lorela Cubaj
June 5, 2023	Signed Taylor Mikesell
July 3, 2023	Waived Taylor Mikesell
July 4, 2023	Activated the temporarily suspended contract of Iliana Rupert due to Overseas Commitments

=== Roster Changes ===
==== Additions ====
Personnel	Signed/Trade	Former Team
Danielle Robinson	Trade	Indiana Fever
Allisha Gray	Trade	Dallas Wings
Laeticia Amihere	Draft Pick	2023 Draft Pick
Haley Jones	Draft Pick	2023 Draft Pick
Iliana Rupert	Waiver Claim	Las Vegas Aces

==== Subtractions ====
Personnel	Reason	New Team
Christie Sides	New Job - Head Coach	Indiana Fever
Kristy Wallace	Traded	Indiana Fever
Tiffany Hayes	Traded	Connecticut Sun
Maya Caldwell	Free Agency	Indiana Fever
Erica Wheeler	Free Agency	Indiana Fever
Kaila Charles	Free Agency	Seattle Storm
Beatrice Mompremier	Waived	-
Kia Vaughn	Retired	-

== Roster ==
2023 Atlanta Dream roster
Players
Coaches

Pos.	No.	Nat.	Name	Height	Weight	DOB	From	Yrs
F	7	(Canada)	Amihere, Laeticia	6' 3" (1.91m)	185 lb (84kg)	2001-07-10	South Carolina	R
F	25	(United States)	Billings, Monique	6' 3" (1.91m)	192 lb (87kg)	1998-12-15	UCLA	5
F	12	(United States)	Coffey, Nia (injured)	6' 1" (1.85m)	182 lb (83kg)	1995-06-11	Northwestern	6
G	23	(United States)	Durr, AD	5' 10" (1.78m)	151 lb (68kg)	1997-04-05	Louisville	2
G	15	(United States)	Gray, Allisha (injured)	6' 0" (1.83m)	167 lb (76kg)	1995-01-12	South Carolina	6
F	00	(United States)	Hillmon, Naz	6' 2" (1.88m)	190 lb (86kg)	2000-04-05	Michigan	1
F	10	(United States)	Howard, Rhyne	6' 2" (1.88m)	175 lb (79kg)	2000-04-29	Kentucky	1
G/F	13	(United States)	Jones, Haley	6' 1" (1.85m)	187 lb (85kg)	2001-05-23	Stanford	R
G	2	(United States)	McDonald, Aari	5' 6" (1.68m)	141 lb (64kg)	1998-08-20	Arizona	2
C	32	(United States)	Parker, Cheyenne	6' 4" (1.93m)	193 lb (88kg)	1993-08-22	Middle Tennessee	8
G	3	(United States)	Robinson, Danielle	5' 9" (1.75m)	137 lb (62kg)	1989-05-10	Oklahoma	11
C	21	(France)	Rupert, Iliana	6' 4" (1.93m)	189 lb (86kg)	2001-07-12	France	1

Head coach
(United States) Tanisha Wright (Penn State)
Assistant coaches
(United States) Vickie Johnson (Louisiana Tech)
(Australia) Paul Goriss
(United States) Barbara Turner (Connecticut)
Athletic trainer
(United States) Natalie Trotter
Strength and conditioning coach
(United States) Drew Williams

Legend

- (C) Team captain
- (DP) Unsigned draft pick
- (FA) Free agent
- (S) Suspended
- Injured

=== Depth ===
Pos.	Starter	Bench
PG	Danielle Robinson	Aari McDonald
SG	Allisha Gray	Haley Jones
SF	Rhyne Howard	AD Durr
PF	Nia Coffey	Naz Hillmon; Laeticia Amihere
C	Cheyenne Parker	Monique Billings; Iliana Rupert

== Schedule ==
=== Preseason ===
2023 pre-season game log
Total: 0–2 (Home: 0–1; Road: 0–1)
May: 0–2 (Home: 0–1; Road: 0–1)

Game	Date	Team	Score	High points	High rebounds	High assists	Location Attendance	Record
1	May 10	@ Washington	L 76–88	Allisha Gray (14)	Leigha Brown (8)	Haley Jones (6)	Entertainment and Sports Arena; 3,612	0–1
2	May 14	Connecticut	L 68–85	Allisha Gray (12)	Cheyenne Parker (7)	Danielle Robinson (4)	Gateway Center Arena; N/A	0–2

2023 pre-season schedule

=== Regular season ===
2023 game log
Total: 19–21 (Home: 11–9; Road: 8–12)
May: 2–2 (Home: 1–1; Road: 1–1)

Game	Date	Team	Score	High points	High rebounds	High assists	Location Attendance	Record
1	May 20	@ Dallas	L 78–83	Rhyne Howard (20)	Cheyenne Parker (11)	Allisha Gray (7)	College Park Center; 5,588	0–1
2	May 23	@ Minnesota	W 83–77	Allisha Gray (26)	Allisha Gray (10)	Howard; McDonald (6)	Target Center; 7,803	1–1
3	May 28	Indiana	L 87–90	Rhyne Howard (23)	Cheyenne Parker (6)	Allisha Gray (4)	Gateway Center Arena; 3,209	1–2
4	May 30	Chicago	W 83–65	Rhyne Howard (20)	Coffey; Parker (8)	Coffey; Hillmon (4)	Gateway Center Arena; 2,562	2–2

June : 4–6 (Home: 1–4; Road: 3–2)

Game	Date	Team	Score	High points	High rebounds	High assists	Location Attendance	Record
5	June 2	Las Vegas	L 87–92	Cheyenne Parker (25)	Cheyenne Parker (11)	Aari McDonald (7)	Gateway Center Arena; 3,209	2–3
6	June 9	New York	L 83–106	Allisha Gray (17)	Cheyenne Parker (7)	Haley Jones (5)	Gateway Center Arena; 3,209	2–4
7	June 11	Connecticut	L 77–89	Cheyenne Parker (20)	Cheyenne Parker (14)	Haley Jones (4)	Gateway Center Arena; 2,690	2–5
8	June 13	@ New York	W 86–79	Allisha Gray (16)	Cheyenne Parker (11)	Rhyne Howard (4)	Barclays Center; 5,719	3–5
9	June 15	@ Connecticut	W 92–88 (OT)	Allisha Gray (27)	Allisha Gray (10)	Haley Jones (9)	Mohegan Sun Arena; 4,316	4–5
10	June 18	@ Indiana	W 100–94	Allisha Gray (25)	Cheyenne Parker (7)	Nia Coffey (6)	Gainbridge Fieldhouse; 4,024	5–5
11	June 20	@ Dallas	L 73–85	Howard; Parker (15)	Monique Billings (7)	Jones; Gray (4)	College Park Center; 3,392	5–6
12	June 23	New York	L 80–110	Rhyne Howard (24)	Monique Billings (9)	Haley Jones (3)	Gateway Center Arena; 3,209	5–7
13	June 28	@ Washington	L 86–109	Cheyenne Parker (23)	Cheyenne Parker (8)	Danielle Robinson (6)	Entertainment and Sports Arena; 3,624	5–8
14	June 30	Washington	W 94–89	Allisha Gray (26)	Monique Billings (6)	Rhyne Howard (8)	Gateway Center Arena; 3,209	6–8

July : 8–3 (Home: 5–1; Road: 3–2)

Game	Date	Team	Score	High points	High rebounds	High assists	Location Attendance	Record
15	July 2	Los Angeles	W 112–84	Rhyne Howard (43)	Naz Hillmon (7)	Jones; Robinson (5)	Gateway Center Arena; 3,209	7–8
16	July 5	@ Los Angeles	W 90–79	Allisha Gray (23)	Cheyenne Parker (11)	Gray; Howard; Robinson (6)	Crypto.com Arena; 5,912	8–8
17	July 7	@ Chicago	W 82–68	Allisha Gray (21)	Cheyenne Parker (10)	Danielle Robinson (6)	Wintrust Arena; 7,911	9–8
18	July 9	@ Chicago	W 88–77	Rhyne Howard (32)	Cheyenne Parker (11)	Danielle Robinson (6)	Wintrust Arena; 7,325	10–8
19	July 12	Seattle	W 85–75	Allisha Gray (19)	Nia Coffey (7)	Howard; Robinson (5)	Gateway Center Arena; 2,546	11–8
20	July 18	Minnesota	W 82–73	Rhyne Howard (21)	Nia Coffey (10)	Rhyne Howard (7)	Gateway Center Arena; 2,394	12–8
21	July 20	@ Connecticut	L 71–82	Rhyne Howard (22)	Nia Coffey (13)	Allisha Gray (7)	Mohegan Sun Arena; 8,054	12–9
22	July 22	Connecticut	L 78–86	Rhyne Howard (22)	Cheyenne Parker (8)	Gray; Howard; Rupert (2)	Gateway Center Arena; 3,209	12–10
23	July 25	Phoenix	W 78–65	Durr; Gray (12)	Iliana Rupert (7)	Haley Jones (5)	Gateway Center Arena; 3,209	13–10
24	July 27	@ New York	L 84–95	Allisha Gray (25)	Allisha Gray (8)	Allisha Gray (6)	Barclays Center; 6,206	13–11
25	July 30	Washington	W 80–73	Allisha Gray (27)	Nia Coffey (9)	Coffey; McDonald (5)	Gateway Center Arena; 3,209	14–11

August : 3–8 (Home: 3–2; Road: 0–6)

Game	Date	Team	Score	High points	High rebounds	High assists	Location Attendance	Record
26	August 1	@ Las Vegas	L 72–93	Cheyenne Parker (19)	Cheyenne Parker (5)	Rhyne Howard (6)	Michelob Ultra Arena; 8,366	14–12
27	August 3	@ Phoenix	L 71–91	Cheyenne Parker (20)	Cheyenne Parker (7)	Aari McDonald (5)	Footprint Center; 7,564	14–13
28	August 6	Indiana	W 82–73	Rhyne Howard (24)	Cheyenne Parker (6)	Allisha Gray (4)	Gateway Center Arena; 3,209	15–13
29	August 10	@ Seattle	L 67–68	Rhyne Howard (20)	Monique Billings (11)	Gray; McDonald (3)	Climate Pledge Arena; 7,649	15–14
30	August 12	@ Los Angeles	L 74–85	Howard; Parker (17)	Cheyenne Parker (7)	Danielle Robinson (5)	Crypto.com Arena; 7,119	15–15
31	August 13	@ Las Vegas	L 65–86	Allisha Gray (19)	Nia Coffey (10)	Howard; Parker (4)	Michelob Ultra Arena; 8,564	15–16
32	August 18	Chicago	W 78–67	Cheyenne Parker (29)	Gray; Parker (7)	McDonald; Robinson (7)	Gateway Center Arena; 2,957	16–16
33	August 22	Las Vegas	L 100–112	Rhyne Howard (27)	Howard; Jones (6)	Howard; Jones; Robinson (5)	Gateway Center Arena; 3,209	16–17
34	August 25	Los Angeles	L 78–83	Cheyenne Parker (22)	Monique Billings (10)	Aari McDonald (5)	Gateway Center Arena; 2,957	16–18
35	August 27	@ Indiana	L 80–83	Cheyenne Parker (24)	Cheyenne Parker (10)	Allisha Gray (4)	Gainbridge Fieldhouse; 4,034	16–19
36	August 29	Phoenix	W 94–76	Cheyenne Parker (25)	Billings; Howard; Parker (7)	Rhyne Howard (6)	Gateway Center Arena; 2,785	17–19

September : 2–2 (Home: 1–1; Road: 1–1)

Game	Date	Team	Score	High points	High rebounds	High assists	Location Attendance	Record
37	September 1	@ Minnesota	L 85–91 (OT)	Cheyenne Parker (20)	Monique Billings (10)	Rhyne Howard (6)	Target Center; 7,114	17–20
38	September 6	Seattle	W 79–68	Allisha Gray (18)	Monique Billings (14)	Howard; McDonald (7)	Gateway Center Arena; 2,731	18–20
39	September 8	@ Washington	W 80–75	Rhyne Howard (21)	Rhyne Howard (12)	Rhyne Howard (4)	Entertainment and Sports Arena; 4,210	19–20
40	September 10	Dallas	L 77–94	Rhyne Howard (19)	Monique Billings (7)	Rhyne Howard (7)	Gateway Center Arena; 3,207	19–21

2023 season schedule

=== Playoffs ===
2023 playoff game log
First Round vs. Dallas
Lost Series: 0–2

Game	Date	Team	Score	High points	High rebounds	High assists	Location Attendance	Series
1	September 15	@ Dallas	L 82–94	Rhyne Howard (36)	Billings; Parker (8)	Robinson; Parker (4)	College Park Center; 5,053	0–1
2	September 19	@ Dallas	L 74–101	Rhyne Howard (21)	Allisha Gray (7)	Allisha Gray (6)	College Park Center; 4,798	0–2

2023 playoff schedule

== Standings ==
#	Team	W	L	PCT	GB	Conf.	Home	Road	Cup
1	x – Las Vegas Aces	34	6	.850	–	18–2	19–1	15–5	9–1
2	x – New York Liberty	32	8	.800	2	16–4	15–5	17–3	7–3
3	x – Connecticut Sun	27	13	.675	7	14–6	13–7	14–6	7–3
4	x – Dallas Wings	22	18	.550	12	11–9	11–9	11–9	6–4
5	x – Atlanta Dream	19	21	.475	15	11–9	11–9	8–12	6–4
6	x – Minnesota Lynx	19	21	.475	15	12–8	9–11	10–10	5–5
7	x – Washington Mystics	19	21	.475	15	9–11	12–8	7–13	5–5
8	x – Chicago Sky	18	22	.450	16	5–15	7–13	11–9	3–7
9	e – Los Angeles Sparks	17	23	.425	17	9–11	10–10	7–13	5–5
10	e – Indiana Fever	13	27	.325	21	5–15	6–14	7–13	2–8
11	e – Seattle Storm	11	29	.275	23	8–12	4–16	7–13	4–6
12	e – Phoenix Mercury	9	31	.225	25	2–18	8–12	1–19	1–9

Notes

(#) – League Standing
x – Clinched playoff berth
e – Eliminated from postseason contention
Source: Overall standings and Commissioner's Cup Standings

== Playoffs ==
**First round** Best-of-3
**1**	**Las Vegas Aces**	**2**
8	Chicago Sky	0
**4**	**Dallas Wings**	**2**
5	Atlanta Dream	0
**2**	**New York Liberty**	**2**
7	Washington Mystics	0
**3**	**Connecticut Sun**	**2**
6	Minnesota Lynx	1

**Semifinals**; Best-of-5
**1**	**Las Vegas Aces**	**3**
4	Dallas Wings	0
**2**	**New York Liberty**	**3**
3	Connecticut Sun	1

**Finals**; Best-of-5
1	**Las Vegas Aces**	**3**
2	New York Liberty	1

- **Bold** – Series winner
- Italic – Team with home-court advantage

== Statistics ==
Legend
GP	Games played	GS	Games started	MPG	Minutes per game	RPG	Rebounds per game
APG	Assists per game	SPG	Steals per game	BPG	Blocks per game	PPG	Points per game
FG%	Field-goal percentage	3P%	3-point field-goal percentage	FT%	Free-throw percentage	TO	Turnovers per game
PF	Fouls per game		Team leader		League leader

=== Regular season ===
Player	GP	GS	MPG	FG%	3P%	FT%	RPG	APG	SPG	BPG	PPG
Rhyne Howard	39	39	32.9	.385	.352	.788	4.9	3.5	1.3	0.6	17.5
Allisha Gray	38	38	32.7	.465	.356	.824	4.9	3.1	1.1	0.4	17.1
Cheyene Parker	40	38	26.7	.483	.278	.829	6.7	1.8	1.1	1.5	15.0
Aari McDonald	24	9	23.5	.402	.321	.762	2.0	3.0	0.6	0.0	7.9
Nia Coffey	31	31	21.9	.432	.402	.625	4.8	1.5	0.5	1.2	6.9
Danielle Robinson	32	27	21.6	.461	.290	.750	2.2	3.3	0.7	0.1	5.8
Monique Billings	39	9	16.7	.407	.000	.836	5.0	0.8	0.4	0.3	4.8
AD Durr	36	0	10.9	.380	.322	.769	1.1	0.7	0.3	0.1	4.8
Naz Hillmon	40	3	13.5	.509	.000	.852	3.4	0.7	0.2	0.1	4.1
Haley Jones	40	6	14.6	.337	.214	.756	2.4	2.3	0.4	0.3	3.7
Laeticia Amihere	20	0	7.4	.405	.000	.537	1.0	0.2	0.3	0.5	2.8
Taylor Mikesell^{‡}	6	0	4.8	.500	.429	1.000	0.3	0.3	0.0	0.0	2.8
Iliana Rupert	20	0	7.9	.353	.273	.625	2.0	0.5	0.4	0.4	1.8
Lorela Cubaj^{‡}	3	0	6.3	.000	.000	.000	2.3	0.0	0.0	0.3	0.0

^{‡}Waived/Released during the season
^{†}Traded during the season
^{≠}Acquired during the season

=== Playoffs ===
Player	GP	GS	MPG	FG%	3P%	FT%	RPG	APG	SPG	BPG	PPG
Rhyne Howard	2	2	37.5	.431	.458	.667	3.5	2.0	2.0	0.5	28.5
Allisha Gray	2	2	36.0	.424	.385	.700	7.0	4.0	1.5	0.5	20.0
Cheyenne Parker	2	2	33.5	.323	.500	.750	6.5	2.0	1.0	2.0	13.0
Monique Billings	2	2	23.5	.286	.000	.625	7.0	0.0	0.5	0.0	4.5
Haley Jones	1	0	3.0	1.000	.000	1.000	0.0	0.0	0.0	0.0	4.0
Aari McDonald	2	0	18.0	.273	.250	.000	1.0	2.5	1.0	0.0	3.5
Danielle Robinson	2	2	22.0	.200	.000	.750	1.5	4.0	1.0	0.0	2.5
Iliana Rupert	1	0	14.0	1.000	.000	.000	3.0	0.0	0.0	1.0	2.0
AD Durr	2	0	5.0	.500	.000	1.000	0.0	0.5	0.0	0.0	2.0
Naz Hillmon	2	0	14.0	1.000	.000	.000	2.0	1.0	0.5	0.0	1.0
Laeticia Amihere	1	0	3.0	.000	.000	.000	0.0	0.0	0.0	0.0	0.0

== Awards and honors ==
Recipient	Award	Date awarded	Ref.
Allisha Gray	WNBA All-Star	July 1	
Cheyenne Parker	WNBA All-Star	July 1	
Rhyne Howard	WNBA All-Star Injury Replacement	July 11	
Tanisha Wright	Coach of the Month - July	August 2	
