= Li Meng (basketball) =

Chinese basketball player (born 1995)

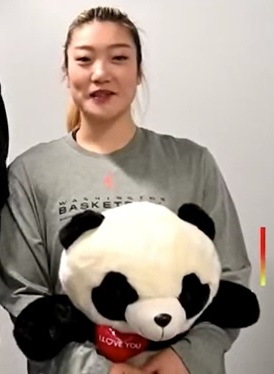
- Li Meng with the Washington Mystics in 2023

Sichuan Yuanda
- Position: Shooting guard
- League: Women's Chinese Basketball Association

Personal information
- Born: 2 January 1995 (age 31) Shenyang, Liaoning, China
- Listed height: 6 ft 0 in (1.83 m)
- Listed weight: 166 lb (75 kg)

Career information
- WNBA draft: 2017: undrafted
- Playing career: 2012–present

Career history
- 2012–2018: Shenyang Army Golden Lions
- 2018–2021: Bayi Kylin
- 2021–present: Sichuan Yuanda
- 2023: Washington Mystics

Career highlights
- WNBA All-Rookie Team (2023); 2× WCBA champion (2023, 2024); WCBA Finals MVP (2024); 2× WCBA regular season MVP (2018, 2019); 2× WCBA scoring leader (2018, 2019); 11× WCBA All-Star (2013, 2014, 2015, 2016, 2017, 2018, 2019, 2021, 2023, 2024, 2025）; WCBA All-Star Weekend Skills Challenge Champion (2013); WCBA Rookie of the Year (2013); Most Valuable Player, 2010 FIBA Under-17 World Championship for Women
- Stats at Basketball Reference
Medals
Women's basketball
Representing China
World Cup
| Silver medal – second place | 2022 Australia |
Asia Cup
| Gold medal – first place | 2023 Australia |
| Silver medal – second place | 2021 Jordan |
| Bronze medal – third place | 2013 Bangkok |
| Bronze medal – third place | 2017 Bangalore |
Asian Games
| Gold medal – first place | 2022 Hangzhou | Team |
| Gold medal – first place | 2018 Jakarta | Team |
East Asian Games
| Gold medal – first place | 2013 Tianjin |

Li Meng (Chinese: 李梦, born 2 January 1995) is a Chinese professional basketball player for Sichuan Yuanda of the Women's Chinese Basketball Association (WCBA.) She has also represented the Chinese national team, where she participated at the 2014, 2018 FIBA World Championship, and 2022 FIBA World Championship.

== Early life ==
Meng grew up in Shenyang, Liaoning. She was recognized for her athletic ability from a young age, with her parents enrolling her in swim lessons at age four. However, after a year of swimming, Meng began suffering from earache and stopped swimming following her doctor's advice. Instead, she began playing basketball at age five. Meng had two dreams as a child: to play for the Chinese women's national basketball team, and to play in the WNBA.

== WNBA ==
On March 13, 2023, Meng signed a training camp contract with the Washington Mystics of the Women's National Basketball Association (WNBA). On May 1, 2023, Meng confirmed via social media that she had earned a spot on the Mystics' regular season roster, making her the fourth Chinese national to play in the WNBA, after Zheng Haixia, Han Xu and Yang Liwei.

On April 22, 2024, Li Meng tallied 23 points, 3 rebounds, 4 assists, and 4 steals in Game 5 of the 2024 WCBA finals to defeat Inner Mongolia and win the WCBA finals. She was named Finals MVP.

== WNBA career statistics ==
Legend
| GP | Games played | GS | Games started | MPG | Minutes per game | RPG | Rebounds per game |
| APG | Assists per game | SPG | Steals per game | BPG | Blocks per game | PPG | Points per game |
| TO | Turnovers per game | FG% | Field-goal percentage | 3P% | 3-point field-goal percentage | FT% | Free-throw percentage |
| **Bold** | Career best | ° | League leader |

=== Regular season ===
| Year | Team | GP | GS | MPG | FG% | 3P% | FT% | RPG | APG | SPG | BPG | TO | PPG |
|---|---|---|---|---|---|---|---|---|---|---|---|---|---|
| 2023 | Washington | 34 | 1 | 15.9 | .378 | .364 | .846 | 1.1 | 1.0 | 0.3 | 0.0 | 0.8 | 5.6 |
| Career | 1 year, 1 team | 34 | 1 | 15.9 | .378 | .364 | .846 | 1.1 | 1.0 | 0.3 | 0.0 | 0.8 | 5.6 |

=== Postseason ===
| Year | Team | GP | GS | MPG | FG% | 3P% | FT% | RPG | APG | SPG | BPG | TO | PPG |
|---|---|---|---|---|---|---|---|---|---|---|---|---|---|
| 2023 | Washington | 2 | 0 | 7.0 | .200 | .250 | — | 0.0 | 0.0 | 0.5 | 0.0 | 0.5 | 1.5 |
| Career | 1 year, 1 team | 2 | 0 | 7.0 | .200 | .250 | — | 0.0 | 0.0 | 0.5 | 0.0 | 0.5 | 1.5 |
