= Cyesha Goree =

American-Hungarian basketball player

Cyesha Damian Goree
Personal information
- Born: August 4, 1993 (age 33) Grand Rapids, Michigan, U.S.
- Listed height: 6 ft 2 in (1.88 m)
- Listed weight: 185 lb (84 kg)

Career information
- High school: Wyoming Park High School (Wyoming, Michigan)
- College: Michigan (2011–2015)
- WNBA draft: 2015: undrafted
- Playing career: 2015–present
- Position: Power forward / center
- Number: 22

Career history
- 2015–2018: UNI Győr
- 2018–2019: Reyer Venezia
- 2019: Perfumerías Avenida
- 2019–2020: Aluinvent DVTK Miskolc
- 2020–2023: KSC Szekszárd
- 2023: Washington Mystics
- 2023-present: UNI Győr
- Stats at Basketball Reference
Medals
Women's 3x3 basketball
Representing Hungary
World Cup
| Silver medal – second place | 2019 Amsterdam | Team |

Cyesha Damian Goree (born August 4, 1993) is an American-Hungarian professional basketball player for the UNI Győr of the Nemzeti Bajnokság I/A in Hungary. Since September 2017, she also holds the citizenship of Hungary, allowing her to play for the national team.

== College statistics ==
| Year | Team | GP | Points | FG% | 3P% | FT% | RPG | APG | SPG | BPG | PPG |
|---|---|---|---|---|---|---|---|---|---|---|---|
| 2011–12 | Michigan | 3 | 3 | .500 | .000 | .333 | 0.7 | 0.0 | 0.3 | 0.0 | 1.0 |
| 2012–13 | Michigan | 9 | 10 | 1.000 | .000 | .000 | 0.4 | 0.0 | 0.0 | 0.2 | 1.1 |
| 2013–14 | Michigan | 34 | 412 | .566 | .000 | .611 | 9.3 | 1.9 | 0.7 | 0.3 | 12.1 |
| 2014–15 | Michigan | 35 | 483 | .521 | .000 | .636 | 10.5 | 2.0 | 1.3 | 0.7 | 13.8 |
| Career | | 81 | 908 | .544 | .000 | .621 | 8.5 | 1.7 | 0.9 | 0.5 | 11.2 |

== WNBA career ==
=== Washington Mystics ===
Goree signed a hardship contract with the Washington Mystics of the WNBA on July 12, 2023. Goree was released from the Hardship Contract on August 14, 2023.

=== WNBA career statistics ===
Legend
| GP | Games played | GS | Games started | MPG | Minutes per game | RPG | Rebounds per game |
| APG | Assists per game | SPG | Steals per game | BPG | Blocks per game | PPG | Points per game |
| TO | Turnovers per game | FG% | Field-goal percentage | 3P% | 3-point field-goal percentage | FT% | Free-throw percentage |
| **Bold** | Career best | ° | League leader |

==== Regular season ====
| Year | Team | GP | GS | MPG | FG% | 3P% | FT% | RPG | APG | SPG | BPG | TO | PPG |
|---|---|---|---|---|---|---|---|---|---|---|---|---|---|
| 2023 | Washington | 10 | 0 | 11.6 | .469 | .214 | .857 | 1.2 | 0.1 | 0.3 | 0.1 | 0.4 | 3.9 |
| Career | 1 year, 1 team | 10 | 0 | 11.6 | .469 | .214 | .857 | 1.2 | 0.1 | 0.3 | 0.1 | 0.4 | 3.9 |
