= Leigha Brown =

American basketball player (born 2000)

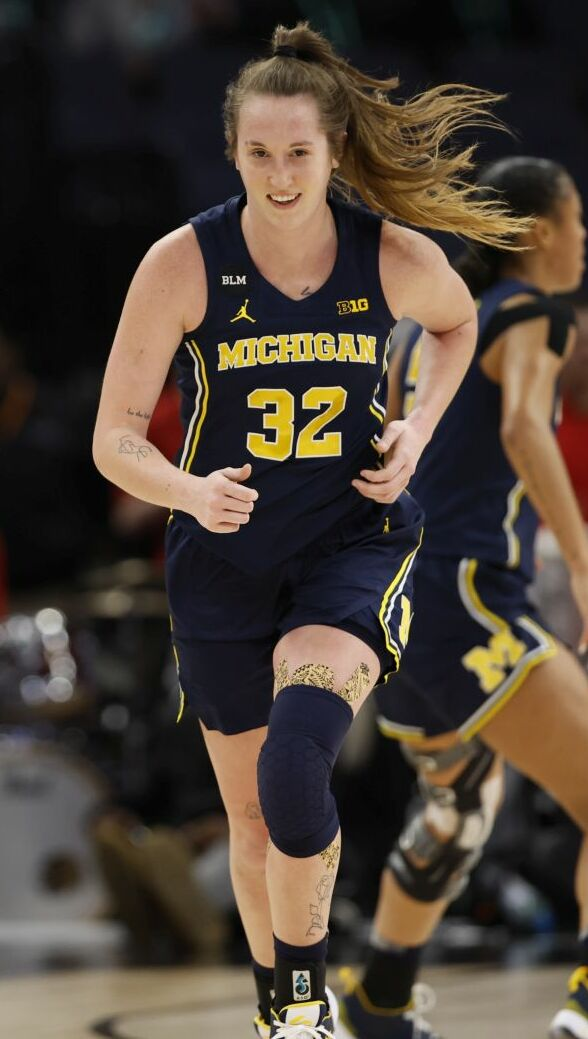
- Brown with Michigan in 2023

No. 32 – Elitzur Holon
- Position: Point guard
- League: Israeli League

Personal information
- Born: July 14, 2000 (age 26) Auburn, Indiana, U.S.
- Listed height: 6 ft 1 in (1.85 m)
- Listed weight: 165 lb (75 kg)

Career information
- High school: DeKalb (Waterloo, Indiana)
- College: Nebraska (2018–2020); Michigan (2021–2023)
- WNBA draft: 2023: 2nd round, 15th overall pick
- Drafted by: Atlanta Dream
- Playing career: 2023–present

Career history
- 2023: Connecticut Sun
- 2023–2024: AE Sedis Bàsquet
- 2024–2025: Explosivas de Moca
- 2025–: Elitzur Holon

Career highlights
- 2× Second-team All-Big Ten (2021, 2022); First-team All-Big Ten (2023); Big Ten Sixth Player of the Year (2020)
- Stats at Basketball Reference

Leigha Don'l Brown (born July 14, 2000) is an American professional basketball player for the Elitzur Holon of the Israeli League. She played college basketball at Nebraska and Michigan.

== College career ==
Brown began her collegiate at Nebraska during the 2018–19 season. In her freshman year, she averaged 9.6 points, 2.6 rebounds and 1.5 assists per game. She appeared in all 30 games, starting the final six games of the season. On February 10, 2019, she recorded a then career-high 30 points in a game against Purdue.

During the 2019–20 season, in her sophomore year, she led Nebraska in scoring, and averaged 14.4 points, 3.3 rebounds and 2.1 assists per game. Following the season she was named Big Ten Sixth Player of the Year and named an All-Big Ten honorable mention.

On April 6, 2020, Brown announced she was transferring to Michigan. During the 2020–21 season, in her first season at Michigan, she started 18 games, averaging 18.2 points and 4.5 rebounds in 33.5 minutes per game. She scored in double-figures in all but one game. Following the season she was named to the All-Big Ten second team by both the coaches and media. During the 2021 NCAA Division I women's basketball tournament, she averaged 24.7 points per game during the tournament, as Michigan advanced to the Sweet Sixteen for the first time in program history.

During the 2021–22 season, in her senior year, she played in 24 games, with 15 starts, and averaged 14.0 points, 3.2 rebounds and 3.4 assists in 26.5 minutes per game, while battling injury all season long. Following the season she was named to the All-Big Ten second team by both the coaches and media for the second consecutive season.

During the 2022–23 season, she appeared in 30 games, with 28 starts, and averaged 17.5 points, 5.1 rebounds and 5.8 assists in 31.9 minutes per game. She posted 25 double-figure scoring games, thirteen 20-point games and two 30-point games. She was one of four players nationally to average at least 17.0 points, 5.0 rebounds and 5.0 assists per game. She finished the season with 174 assists, the third-most single-season assists in Michigan history, and just four off from the all-time single season program record. On February 20, 2023, she posted a career-high 36 points and nine rebounds in a game against Ohio State. Following the season she was named to the All-Big Ten first team by both the coaches and media and was named an Associated Press All-American honorable mention. Brown finished her career at Michigan with 1,188 points and 303 assists, becoming one of five players in program history to surpass 1,000-plus points and 300-plus assists.

== Professional career ==
On April 10, 2023, Brown was drafted in the second round, 15th overall, by the Atlanta Dream in the 2023 WNBA draft. This reunited her with former Michigan teammate Naz Hillmon. She became the eighth Wolverine player drafted all time, and tied with Hillmon for being the highest draft picks in program history.

=== Connecticut Sun ===
On May 16, 2023, Brown was traded to the Connecticut Sun in exchange for a third-round pick in the 2025 WNBA draft. She was waived by the Sun prior to the 2024 season.

=== AE Sedis Bàsquet ===
On November 12, 2023, Brown signed a one-year contract with AE Sedis Bàsquet of the Liga Femenina de Baloncesto in Spain.

=== Elitzur Holon ===
On December 11, 2025, Brown signed a one-year contract with Elitzur Holon of the Israeli League.

== Career statistics ==
Legend
GP	Games played	GS	Games started	MPG	Minutes per game	RPG	Rebounds per game
APG	Assists per game	SPG	Steals per game	BPG	Blocks per game	PPG	Points per game
TO	Turnovers per game	FG%	Field-goal percentage	3P%	3-point field-goal percentage	FT%	Free-throw percentage
**Bold**	Career best	°	League leader

=== College ===
Year	Team	GP	GS	MPG	FG%	3P%	FT%	RPG	APG	SPG	BPG	TO	PPG
2018–19	Nebraska	30	6	19.1	42.2	**36.0**	73.4	2.6	1.5	0.7	0.1	**1.0**	9.6
2019–20	Nebraska	30	0	25.8	43.6	34.1	76.3	3.4	2.1	0.5	0.1	1.7	14.4
2020–21	Michigan	18	18	**33.5**	**52.3**	30.8	75.5	4.5	3.1	1.3	0.4	3.1	**18.2**
2021–22	Michigan	24	15	26.5	44.4	32.3	**82.2**	3.2	3.4	**1.5**	0.4	2.4	14.0
2022–23	Michigan	30	**28**	31.9	51.3	29.0	77.0	**5.1**	**5.8**	1.3	0.4	3.6	17.5
**Career**		132	67	26.8	46.8	32.8	76.9	3.7	3.2	1.0	0.3	2.3	14.5
Statistics retrieved from Sports-Reference.

=== WNBA ===
==== Regular season ====
Year	Team	GP	GS	MPG	FG%	3P%	FT%	RPG	APG	SPG	BPG	TO	PPG
2023	Connecticut	25	0	5.2	.308	.100	.667	0.8	0.4	0.2	0.1	0.4	0.8
Career	1 years, 1 team	25	0	5.2	.308	.100	.667	0.8	0.4	0.2	0.1	0.4	0.8

==== Playoffs ====
Year	Team	GP	GS	MPG	FG%	3P%	FT%	RPG	APG	SPG	BPG	TO	PPG
2023	Connecticut	2	0	3.0	0.0	0.0	0.0	0.5	0.5	0.0	0.0	0.5	0.0
Career	1 years, 1 team	2	0	3.0	0.0	0.0	0.0	0.5	0.5	0.0	0.0	0.5	0.0
