= 2023 Connecticut Sun season =

- Head coach: Stephanie White
- Arena: Mohegan Sun Arena

Results
- Record: 27–13 (.675)
- Place: 2nd (Eastern)
- Playoff finish: 3rd seed, Lost in Semifinals 1–3 to New York

The 2023 Connecticut Sun season was the 25th season for the Connecticut Sun franchise of the Women's National Basketball Association. It was the 21st season for the franchise in Connecticut after relocating from Orlando.

On November 22, 2022, the Sun announced that Stephanie White would be the new head coach for the franchise, after Curt Miller left for the same job with Los Angeles. White previously coached in the WNBA with the Indiana Fever, while most recently coaching for the Vanderbilt Commodores women's basketball team.

The season started well for the Sun as they won their first three games of the year, including two in a row against Washington. They would lose their next game to New York, but would win the final game of the month to finish May 4–1. They started off June by winning four of their first five games and they would finish by winning four of six games. The end of the month also included a four game winning streak. The Sun finished June 8–3. July opened with a loss to Las Vegas but then the sun went on a three-game winning streak. A loss to Phoenix broke that streak, but the Sun followed it up with another three game winning streak. They lost the final game of the month to finish 6–3 in July. They won three games to open August, but followed that streak by losing three games. They ended their three game losing streak on August 20 with a win over Chicago and that win clinched the Sun a playoff berth. They ended the month winning three of four games to finish with a 7–4 August record. The Sun entered September having clinched their playoff berth and being safely in the third seed. The finished the season 2–2 including a final day loss. They finished the regular season with a 27–13 record and were the third seed in the 2023 WNBA Playoffs. Their twenty-seven wins were the most in franchise history.

As the third seed in the Playoffs Connecticut would host the first two games of a three game series against the sixth seed Minnesota Lynx. Game one started out as a tight affair but Connecticut broke away in the second and fourth quarters to win the first game 90–60. Game two was a closer affair, with the Lynx leading by five points at halftime. Connecticut couldn't break into their lead after the half and eventually lost 75–82. In game three, in Minnesota, the Sun dominated the first half, leading by fifteen at halftime. The Lynx couldn't close the gap, as the second half ended tied. The Sun won the game 90–75 and the series two games to one. The Sun advanced to the semifinals to face-off against the second seed New York Liberty. In the first game of the series Connecticut used a strong second half to win 78–63. In game two, the Sun won the first quarter but the Liberty won the other three quarters and the Sun lost 77–84. Games three and four moved to Connecticut. Homecourt didn't help the Sun in game 3 of the series, as they lost 81–92. In a must-win game four the Sun kept the game close, but ultimately came up short 84–87. The Sun lost the semifinal series one game to three to end their season.

== Transactions ==
=== WNBA draft ===
Round	Pick	Player	Nationality	School/Team/Country
2	22	Alexis Morris	United States	LSU
3	34	Ashten Prechtel	United States	Stanford

=== Transactions ===
Date	Details
October 21, 2022	Head coach Curt Miller resigns and takes job with the Los Angeles Sparks
November 21, 2022	Hired Stephanie White as Head Coach
November 29, 2022	Hired Darius Taylor as General Manager
November 29, 2022	Promoted Morgan Tuck to Assistant General Manager
December 27, 2022	Hired Abi Olajuwon as an Assistant Coach
January 3, 2023	Hired Briann January as Assistant Coach
January 11, 2023	Extended Qualifying Offers to Natisha Hiedeman and Joyner Holmes
January 16, 2023	Traded Jonquel Jones to the New York Liberty as part of a 3-Team Trade. Connecticut received Rebecca Allen and the 6th Overall Pick in the 2023 WNBA draft from New York and Tyasha Harris from the Dallas Wings.
January 16, 2023	Traded Jasmine Thomas and the 10th Overall Pick in the 2023 WNBA Draft to the Los Angeles Sparks in exchange for the Olivia Nelson-Ododa, Jasmine Walker, and Kianna Smith
January 19, 2023	Cored Brionna Jones
February 1, 2023	Signed Joyner Holmes to a Qualifying Offer - Training Camp Contract
February 3, 2023	Signed Natisha Hiedeman to a 2-Year Deal
February 3, 2023	Signed Mikiah Herbert Harrigan to a Training Camp Contract
February 7, 2023	Signed Kristine Anigwe and Lauren Cox to Training Camp Contracts
February 9, 2023	Traded the 6th Overall Pick in the 2023 WNBA draft to the Atlanta Dream in exchange for Tiffany Hayes
February 10, 2023	Signed Kiki Smith to a Rookie Scale Contract
February 13, 2023	Signed Brionna Jones to a 1-Year Deal
February 15, 2023	Signed Tiffany Hayes to a 1-Year Deal
February 15, 2023	Signed Victoria Macaulay to a Training Camp Contract
February 15, 2023	Waived Jasmine Walker
February 16, 2023	Waived Kristine Anigwe
February 17, 2023	Signed Nirra Fields to a Training Camp Contract
February 21, 2023	Waived Joyner Holmes
April 12, 2023	Signed Ashten Prechtal to a Rookie Scale Contract
April 12, 2023	Signed Khaalia Hillsman, Caitlin Bickle, and Jayla Everett to Training Camp Contracts
April 15, 2023	Waived Nirra Fields
April 18, 2023	Signed Alexis Morris to a Rookie Scale Contract
April 27, 2023	Signed Lasha Petree to a Training Camp Contract
April 30, 2023	Waived Lasha Petree
April 30, 2023	Signed Diamond Battles to a Training Camp Contract
May 3, 2023	Waived Mikiah Herbert Harrigan, Khaalia Hillsman, and Kiara Smith
May 5, 2023	Waived Victoria Macaulay
May 9, 2023	Exercised 4th-Year Team Option on DiJonai Carrington
May 10, 2023	Waived Alexis Morris, Diamond Battles, and Ashten Prechtel
May 15, 2023	Signed Tyasha Harris to a Contract Extension
May 16, 2023	Waived Caitlin Bickle, Nia Clouden, and Jayla Everett
May 16, 2023	Traded a 2025 Third-Round Pick to the Atlanta Dream in exchange for Leigha Brown
June 1, 2023	Waived Lauren Cox
June 3, 2023	Signed Liz Dixon
July 14, 2023	Waived Liz Dixon
July 17, 2023	Signed Kristine Anigwe to a 7-Day Contract
July 26, 2023	Signed Bernadett Határ
August 18, 2023	Signed Kristine Anigwe to a 2nd 7-Day Contract

=== Roster changes ===
==== Additions ====
Personnel	Signed/Trade	Former team
Rebecca Allen	Trade	New York Liberty
Tyasha Harris	Trade	Dallas Wings
Olivia Nelson-Ododa	Trade	Los Angeles Sparks
Tiffany Hayes	Trade	Atlanta Dream
Leigha Brown	Trade	Atlanta Dream
Bernadett Határ	Signed	Indiana Fever

==== Subtractions ====
Personnel	Reason	New team
Jonquel Jones	Trade	New York Liberty
Jasmine Thomas	Trade	Los Angeles Sparks
Courtney Williams	Free Agency	Chicago Sky
Nia Clouden	Waived	Los Angeles Sparks
Joyner Holmes	Waived	Los Angeles Sparks
Odyssey Sims	Free Agency	Dallas Wings

== Roster ==
2023 Connecticut Sun roster
Players
Coaches

Pos.	No.	Nat.	Name	Height	Weight	DOB	From	Yrs
G/F	9	(Australia)	Allen, Rebecca	6' 2" (1.88m)	162 lb (73kg)	1992-11-06	Australia	7
G/F	24	(North Macedonia)	Bonner, DeWanna	6' 4" (1.93m)	143 lb (65kg)	1987-08-21	Auburn	13
G	32	(United States)	Brown, Leigha	6' 1" (1.85m)	165 lb (75kg)	2000-07-14	Michigan	R
G/F	21	(United States)	Carrington, DiJonai	5' 11" (1.8m)	175 lb (79kg)	1998-01-08	Baylor	2
G	52	(United States)	Harris, Tyasha	5' 10" (1.78m)	152 lb (69kg)	1998-05-01	South Carolina	3
C	44	(Hungary)	Határ, Bernadett	6' 10" (2.08m)	208 lb (94kg)	1994-08-24	Hungary	1
G	15	(United States)	Hayes, Tiffany	5' 10" (1.78m)	155 lb (70kg)	1989-09-20	Connecticut	10
G	2	(United States)	Hiedeman, Natisha	5' 8" (1.73m)	135 lb (61kg)	1997-02-10	Marquette	4
F	42	(United States)	Jones, Brionna (injured)	6' 3" (1.91m)	230 lb (104kg)	1995-12-18	Maryland	6
C	10	(United States)	Nelson-Ododa, Olivia	6' 5" (1.96m)	173 lb (78kg)	2000-08-17	Connecticut	1
F	25	(United States)	Thomas, Alyssa	6' 2" (1.88m)	185 lb (84kg)	1992-04-12	Maryland	8

Head coach
(United States) Stephanie White (Purdue)
Assistant coaches
(United States) Abi Olajuwon (Oklahoma)
(United States) Briann January (Arizona State)
(United States) Austin Kelly (Duke)
Athletic trainer
(United States) Nicole Alexander
Strength and conditioning coach
(United States) Analisse Rios

Legend

- (C) Team captain
- (DP) Unsigned draft pick
- (FA) Free agent
- (S) Suspended
- Injured

=== Depth chart ===
Pos.	Starter	Bench
PG	Natisha Hiedeman	Tyasha Harris
SG	Tiffany Hayes	DiJonai Carrington
SF	Rebecca Allen	Leigha Brown
PF	DeWanna Bonner	Olivia Nelson-Ododa
C	Alyssa Thomas	Bernadett Határ; Brionna Jones

== Schedule ==
=== Preseason ===
2023 pre-season game log
Total: 2–0 (Home: 1–0; Road: 1–0)
May: 2–0 (Home: 1–0; Road: 1–0)

Game	Date	Team	Score	High points	High rebounds	High assists	Location Attendance	Record
1	May 10	New York	W 63–57	Brionna Jones (10)	Rebecca Allen (6)	Alyssa Thomas (5)	Mohegan Sun; N/A	1–0
2	May 14	@ Atlanta	W 85–68	Tiffany Hayes (20)	Alyssa Thomas (9)	Alyssa Thomas (5)	Gateway Center Arena; N/A	2–0

2023 pre-season schedule

=== Regular season ===
2023 game log
Total: 27–13 (Home: 13–7; Road: 14–6)
May: 4–1 (Home: 2–0; Road: 2–1)

Game	Date	Team	Score	High points	High rebounds	High assists	Location Attendance	Record
1	May 19	@ Indiana	W 70–61	DeWanna Bonner (19)	Alyssa Thomas (11)	Alyssa Thomas (6)	Gainbridge Fieldhouse; 7,356	1–0
2	May 21	Washington	W 80–74	DeWanna Bonner (21)	Alyssa Thomas (16)	Alyssa Thomas (6)	Mohegan Sun Arena; 7,048	2–0
3	May 23	@ Washington	W 88–81	Alyssa Thomas (22)	Alyssa Thomas (10)	Tiffany Hayes (8)	Entertainment and Sports Arena; 3,383	3–0
4	May 27	@ New York	L 65–81	Tiffany Hayes (16)	Jones; Thomas (8)	Tiffany Hayes (3)	Barclays Center; 7,102	3–1
5	May 30	Indiana	W 81–78	Tiffany Hayes (22)	Alyssa Thomas (17)	Alyssa Thomas (7)	Mohegan Sun Arena; 5,317	4–1

June : 8–3 (Home: 3–3; Road: 5–0)

Game	Date	Team	Score	High points	High rebounds	High assists	Location Attendance	Record
6	June 1	@ Minnesota	W 89–84	Natisha Hiedeman (19)	Alyssa Thomas (9)	Alyssa Thomas (16)	Target Center; 8,124	5–1
7	June 4	Dallas	W 80–74	DeWanna Bonner (22)	Alyssa Thomas (10)	Alyssa Thomas (6)	Mohegan Sun Arena; 5,012	6–1
8	June 6	Las Vegas	L 84–90	Rebecca Allen (22)	Alyssa Thomas (11)	Hiedeman; Jones (7)	Mohegan Sun Arena; 4,368	6–2
9	June 8	Las Vegas	W 94–77	DeWanna Bonner (41)	Brionna Jones (9)	Alyssa Thomas (12)	Mohegan Sun Arena; 5,147	7–2
10	June 11	@ Atlanta	W 89–77	Brionna Jones (18)	Alyssa Thomas (12)	Alyssa Thomas (8)	Gateway Center Arena; 2,690	8–2
11	June 15	Atlanta	L 88–92 (OT)	Brionna Jones (28)	Brionna Jones (13)	Alyssa Thomas (7)	Mohegan Sun Arena; 4,316	8–3
12	June 18	@ Los Angeles	W 83–74	DeWanna Bonner (20)	DeWanna Bonner (9)	Alyssa Thomas (12)	Crypto.com Arena; 6,289	9–3
13	June 20	@ Seattle	W 85–79	DeWanna Bonner (20)	Alyssa Thomas (15)	Alyssa Thomas (12)	Climate Pledge Arena; 7,022	10–3
14	June 22	@ Minnesota	W 89–68	Tiffany Hayes (21)	Alyssa Thomas (9)	Olivia Nelson-Ododa (4)	Target Center; 7,024	11–3
15	June 25	Chicago	W 96–72	DeWanna Bonner (26)	Alyssa Thomas (12)	Alyssa Thomas (11)	Mohegan Sun Arena; 6,517	12–3
16	June 27	New York	L 81–89	DiJonai Carrington (23)	Alyssa Thomas (10)	Alyssa Thomas (10)	Mohegan Sun Arena; 7,344	12–4

July : 6–3 (Home: 3–1; Road: 3–2)

Game	Date	Team	Score	High points	High rebounds	High assists	Location Attendance	Record
17	July 1	@ Las Vegas	L 84–102	DeWanna Bonner (19)	Alyssa Thomas (5)	Alyssa Thomas (11)	Michelob Ultra Arena; 8,596	12–5
18	July 6	Seattle	W 93–73	Bonner; Thomas (16)	Olivia Nelson-Ododa (9)	Alyssa Thomas (7)	Mohegan Sun Arena; 5,479	13–5
19	July 9	Washington	92–84	DeWanna Bonner (28)	Alyssa Thomas (9)	Alyssa Thomas (6)	Mohegan Sun Arena; 6,558	14–5
20	July 12	@ Chicago	W 84–72	Tiffany Hayes (22)	Hayes; Thomas (7)	Alyssa Thomas (10)	Wintrust Arena; 9,025	15–5
21	July 18	@ Phoenix	L 66–72	DeWanna Bonner (19)	DeWanna Bonner (10)	Alyssa Thomas (7)	Footprint Center; 7,788	15–6
22	July 20	Atlanta	W 82–71	Natisha Hiedeman (24)	Alyssa Thomas (10)	Alyssa Thomas (7)	Mohegan Sun Arena; 8,054	16–6
23	July 22	@ Atlanta	W 86–78	DeWanna Bonner (20)	Alyssa Thomas (11)	Alyssa Thomas (8)	Gateway Center Arena; 3,209	17–6
24	July 25	@ Dallas	W 88–83	DeWanna Bonner (32)	Alyssa Thomas (10)	Alyssa Thomas (7)	College Park Center; 4,222	18–6
25	July 30	Minnesota	L 83–87	DeWanna Bonner (31)	Alyssa Thomas (14)	Alyssa Thomas (11)	Mohegan Sun Arena; 8,275	18–7

August : 7–4 (Home: 3–2; Road: 4–2)

Game	Date	Team	Score	High points	High rebounds	High assists	Location Attendance	Record
26	August 1	Minnesota	W 79–69	Alyssa Thomas (21)	Alyssa Thomas (20)	Alyssa Thomas (12)	Mohegan Sun Arena; 4,894	19–7
27	August 4	@ Indiana	W 88–72	Tiffany Hayes (18)	Olivia Nelson-Ododa (10)	Alyssa Thomas (8)	Gainbridge Fieldhouse; 3,498	20–7
28	August 8	@ Seattle	W 81–69	DeWanna Bonner (21)	Alyssa Thomas (12)	Alyssa Thomas (8)	Climate Pledge Arena; 10,212	21–7
29	August 10	@ Phoenix	L 84–90	Rebecca Allen (24)	Alyssa Thomas (11)	Alyssa Thomas (8)	Footprint Center; 7,186	21–8
30	August 12	@ Dallas	L 81–91	Alyssa Thomas (26)	Alyssa Thomas (10)	Natisha Hiedeman (6)	College Park Center; 4,179	21–9
31	August 18	Dallas	L 75–95	DeWanna Bonner (25)	DeWanna Bonner (12)	Alyssa Thomas (7)	Mohegan Sun Arena; 6,584	21–10
32	August 20	@ Chicago	W 79–73	Alyssa Thomas (22)	Rebecca Allen (9)	Alyssa Thomas (8)	Wintrust Arena; 6,901	22–10
33	August 22	@ Washington	W 68–64	Alyssa Thomas (22)	Alyssa Thomas (10)	DeWanna Bonner (5)	Entertainment and Sports Arena; 3,058	23–10
34	August 24	New York	L 90–95 (OT)	DeWanna Bonner (30)	DeWanna Bonner (12)	Alyssa Thomas (12)	Mohegan Sun Arena; 9,168	23–11
35	August 27	Los Angeles	W 83–68	Alyssa Thomas (17)	Olivia Nelson-Ododa (11)	Alyssa Thomas (8)	Mohegan Sun Arena; 6,783	24–11
36	August 31	Phoenix	W 84–74	Harris; Hiedman (18)	Alyssa Thomas (13)	Alyssa Thomas (8)	Mohegan Sun Arena; 7,794	25–11

September : 2–2 (Home: 2–1; Road: 0–1)

Game	Date	Team	Score	High points	High rebounds	High assists	Location Attendance	Record
37	September 1	@ New York	L 58–89	Tiffany Hayes (11)	5 players (4)	DeWanna Bonner (4)	Barclays Center; 8,276	25–12
38	September 5	Los Angeles	W 90–76	Alyssa Thomas (27)	Alyssa Thomas (12)	Alyssa Thomas (14)	Mohegan Sun Arena; 4,783	26–12
39	September 8	Indiana	W 76–59	Tiffany Hayes (14)	Alyssa Thomas (14)	Alyssa Thomas (8)	Mohegan Sun Arena; 5,064	27–12
40	September 10	Chicago	L 91–102 (OT)	Olivia Nelson-Ododa (20)	Olivia Nelson-Ododa (11)	Brown; Carrington; Thomas (4)	Mohegan Sun Arena; 6,377	27–13

2023 season schedule

=== Playoffs ===
2023 playoff game log
First Round vs. Minnesota
Won Series: 2–1

Game	Date	Team	Score	High points	High rebounds	High assists	Location Attendance	Series
1	September 13	Minnesota	W 90–60	DeWanna Bonner (17)	DeWanna Bonner (15)	Alyssa Thomas (10)	Mohegan Sun Arena; 5,056	1–0
2	September 17	Minnesota	L 75–82	Alyssa Thomas (26)	Rebecca Allen (9)	Alyssa Thomas (6)	Mohegan Sun Arena; 6,673	1–1
3	September 20	@ Minnesota	W 90–75	Alyssa Thomas (28)	DeWanna Bonner (10)	Alyssa Thomas (12)	Target Center; 8,724	2–1

Semifinals vs. New York Liberty
Lost Series: 1–3

Game	Date	Team	Score	High points	High rebounds	High assists	Location Attendance	Series
1	September 24	@ New York	W 78–63	DeWanna Bonner (20)	Allen; Bonner; Hayes; Thomas (7)	Alyssa Thomas (10)	Barclays Center; 9,442	1–0
2	September 26	@ New York	L 77–84	Tiffany Hayes (30)	Alyssa Thomas (8)	Alyssa Thomas (9)	Barclays Center; 10,009	1–1
3	September 29	New York	L 81–92	Alyssa Thomas (23)	Alyssa Thomas (9)	Alyssa Thomas (14)	Mohegan Sun Arena; 9,162	1–2
4	October 1	New York	L 84–87	Alyssa Thomas (17)	Alyssa Thomas (15)	Alyssa Thomas (11)	Mohegan Sun Arena; 8,196	1–3

2023 playoff schedule

== Standings ==
#	Team	W	L	PCT	GB	Conf.	Home	Road	Cup
1	x – Las Vegas Aces	34	6	.850	–	18–2	19–1	15–5	9–1
2	x – New York Liberty	32	8	.800	2	16–4	15–5	17–3	7–3
3	x – Connecticut Sun	27	13	.675	7	14–6	13–7	14–6	7–3
4	x – Dallas Wings	22	18	.550	12	11–9	11–9	11–9	6–4
5	x – Atlanta Dream	19	21	.475	15	11–9	11–9	8–12	6–4
6	x – Minnesota Lynx	19	21	.475	15	12–8	9–11	10–10	5–5
7	x – Washington Mystics	19	21	.475	15	9–11	12–8	7–13	5–5
8	x – Chicago Sky	18	22	.450	16	5–15	7–13	11–9	3–7
9	e – Los Angeles Sparks	17	23	.425	17	9–11	10–10	7–13	5–5
10	e – Indiana Fever	13	27	.325	21	5–15	6–14	7–13	2–8
11	e – Seattle Storm	11	29	.275	23	8–12	4–16	7–13	4–6
12	e – Phoenix Mercury	9	31	.225	25	2–18	8–12	1–19	1–9

Notes

(#) – League Standing
x – Clinched playoff berth
e – Eliminated from postseason contention
Source: Overall standings and Commissioner's Cup Standings

== Playoffs ==
**First round** Best-of-3
**1**	**Las Vegas Aces**	**2**
8	Chicago Sky	0
**4**	**Dallas Wings**	**2**
5	Atlanta Dream	0
**2**	**New York Liberty**	**2**
7	Washington Mystics	0
**3**	**Connecticut Sun**	**2**
6	Minnesota Lynx	1

**Semifinals**; Best-of-5
**1**	**Las Vegas Aces**	**3**
4	Dallas Wings	0
**2**	**New York Liberty**	**3**
3	Connecticut Sun	1

**Finals**; Best-of-5
1	**Las Vegas Aces**	**3**
2	New York Liberty	1

- **Bold** – Series winner
- Italic – Team with home-court advantage

== Statistics ==
Legend
GP	Games played	GS	Games started	MPG	Minutes per game	RPG	Rebounds per game
APG	Assists per game	SPG	Steals per game	BPG	Blocks per game	PPG	Points per game
FG%	Field-goal percentage	3P%	3-point field-goal percentage	FT%	Free-throw percentage	TO	Turnovers per game
PF	Fouls per game		Team leader		League leader

=== Regular season ===
Player	GP	GS	MPG	FG%	3P%	FT%	RPG	APG	SPG	BPG	PPG
DeWanna Bonner	40	40	30.1	.425	.329	.862	5.6	2.2	1.1	0.6	17.4
Brionna Jones	13	13	31.7	.571	.500	.776	8.2	2.4	1.8	0.5	15.9
Alyssa Thomas	40	40	36.2	.474	.000	.715	9.9	7.9	1.8	0.5	15.5
Tiffany Hayes	40	40	27.1	.476	.366	.778	3.0	2.6	0.9	0.1	12.1
Natisha Hiedeman	40	40	26.7	.392	.366	.739	2.1	2.7	0.9	0.1	8.5
DiJonai Carrington	32	0	17.2	.417	.371	.757	2.9	1.3	0.6	0.1	8.3
Rebecca Allen	40	27	21.5	.408	.348	.704	2.8	0.9	0.9	1.3	6.4
Tyasha Harris	40	0	16.7	.416	.464	.680	0.9	1.7	0.7	0.1	5.8
Olivia Nelson-Ododa	39	0	15.0	.537	.000	.708	3.7	0.6	0.5	0.8	4.5
Bernadett Határ^{≠}	6	0	7.8	.375	.000	.000	1.5	0.2	0.7	0.3	2.0
Liz Dixon^{‡}	4	0	5.3	.400	.000	.000	0.5	0.3	0.0	0.3	1.0
Leigha Brown	25	0	5.2	.308	.100	.667	0.8	0.4	0.2	0.1	0.8
Kristine Anigwe^{‡}	3	0	2.0	.000	.000	.000	0.3	0.0	0.0	0.0	0.0
Lauren Cox^{‡}	1	0	0.0	.000	.000	.000	0.0	0.0	0.0	0.0	0.0

^{‡}Waived/Released during the season
^{†}Traded during the season
^{≠}Acquired during the season

=== Playoffs ===
Player	GP	GS	MPG	FG%	3P%	FT%	RPG	APG	SPG	BPG	PPG
DeWanna Bonner	7	7	36.9	.385	.365	.774	8.3	3.4	1.0	1.6	18.1
Alyssa Thomas	7	7	38.9	.500	.000	.630	8.0	10.3	1.7	0.3	18.1
Tiffany Hayes	7	7	26.1	.527	.484	.875	3.4	1.6	0.6	0.3	14.3
Rebecca Allen	6	6	30.8	.489	.423	1.00	5.5	1.7	1.5	1.5	9.7
Tyasha Harris	7	0	21.9	.462	.542	.800	1.0	2.4	0.7	0.0	9.3
Natisha Hiedeman	7	7	22.0	.310	.316	.750	1.9	2.3	0.1	0.1	5.4
DiJonai Carrington	6	0	13.7	.464	.250	.600	2.3	0.5	0.7	0.0	5.0
Olivia Nelson-Ododa	7	1	15.4	.667	.000	1.00	3.4	0.6	1.0	0.9	4.3
Leigha Brown	2	0	3.0	.000	.000	.000	0.5	0.5	0.0	0.0	0.0

== Awards and honors ==
Recipient	Award	Date awarded	Ref.
Alyssa Thomas	Eastern Conference Player of the Week	June 6	
Alyssa Thomas	Eastern Conference Player of the Week	June 27	
Alyssa Thomas	Eastern Conference Player of the Week	August 8	
Alyssa Thomas	WNBA All-Star	July 1	
Alyssa Thomas	Player of the Month - June	July 5	
Alyssa Thomas	Peak Performer: Rebounds	September 11	
Alyssa Thomas	All-Defensive First Team	September 22	
Alyssa Thomas	All-WNBA First Team	October 15	
Stephanie White	Coach of the Month - May	June 2	
Stephanie White	Coach of the Year	September 17	
DeWanna Bonner	WNBA All-Star	July 1	
