= 2023 Dallas Wings season =

- Head coach: Latricia Trammell
- Arena: College Park Center

Results
- Record: 22–18 (.550)
- Place: 2nd (Western)
- Playoff finish: 4th seed, Lost in the Semifinals 0–3 to Las Vegas

The 2023 Dallas Wings season was the franchise's 26th season in the Women's National Basketball Association and the 8th season for the franchise in Dallas - after relocating from Tulsa and Detroit. This was the first season under head coach Latricia Trammell.

On September 19, 2022, the Wings announced that they would not renew the contract of head coach Vickie Johnson, effectively firing her. On November 7, 2022, the Wings announced that Trammell would be the new head coach for the organization.

The season began well, with the Wings winning their first two games and finishing 3–1 in the opening month of May. However, their good run of form did not carry over into June as they lost their first two games, before winning their next two. The team then went on a three game losing streak, and only managed to win two of their final four games in the month after the losing streak. The Wings finished June 4–7 overall, and three of those four wins came against Phoenix. The Wings turned things around in July where they won six of their first seven games in the month, including being only the second team to defeat the Las Vegas Aces at the time. They would lose two of their last three games, but finish July with a 7–3 record. August became a mixed bag for the team as they won their first game but then went on a three game losing streak. They followed this with a three game winning streak before losing two of their last three games to finish the month 5–5. After starting September with a win over the Indiana Fever, Dallas secured a playoff spot. After securing this spot, they lost their next two games. However, they won their last two games of the season to finish September 3–2. The Wings finished with an overall regular season record of 22–18. Their 22 regular season wins were a franchise best in Dallas, and best since 2008, when the franchise was still located in Detroit.

With their 22–18 record, Dallas was the fourth seed in the 2023 WNBA Playoffs. They would face off against the Atlanta Dream in the first round, with the first two games of the series being held in Dallas. In a back-and-forth game one, Dallas had a big fourth quarter and won the game 94–82. Game two began close, but the Wings dominated the second and fourth quarters to win 101–74 to sweep the first round series 2 games to 0. In the second round, the Wings faced off against the first-seeded Las Vegas Aces. The first two games of the five game series were in Las Vegas. Game one started as a tight affair, with Dallas trailing by only four points at halftime, but the Aces dominated the third quarter and won the game 91–84. In game two the Wings trailed for most of the game but mounted a comeback that fell short, losing 84–91. The series then moved to Dallas for a must-win game three for the Wings. Dallas took a five-point lead into halftime, but couldn't hold on in the second half losing 61–64 to end their season.

== Transactions ==
=== WNBA draft ===
Round	Pick	Player	School/Team/Country	Nationality
1	3	Maddy Siegrist	United States	Villanova
1	5	Lou Lopez Sénéchal	Mexico/France	UConn
1	11	Abby Meyers	United States	Maryland
2	19	Ashley Joens	United States	Iowa State
3	31	Paige Robinson	United States	Illinois State

=== Transactions ===
Date	Transaction
September 19, 2022	Fired Head Coach Vickie Johnson
November 7, 2022	Hired Latricia Trammell as Head Coach
November 17, 2022	Hired Brandi Poole as Assistant Coach
January 9, 2023	Hired April Schilling and Courtney Paris as Assistant Coaches
January 11, 2023	Extended Qualifying Offers to Marina Mabrey and Teaira McCowan
January 16, 2023	Traded Kayla Thornton to the New York Liberty in exchange for Natasha Howard and Crystal Dangerfield, as part of a 3-Team Trade. The Wings also traded Tyasha Harris to the Connecticut Sun.
January 21, 2023	Traded Allisha Gray to the Atlanta Dream in exchange for the #3 Overall Pick in the 2023 WNBA draft and a First-Round Pick in 2025
February 1, 2023	Signed Teaira McCowan to a 3-Year Deal
February 1, 2023	Full Season Contract Suspension of Bella Alarie
February 2, 2023	Signed Crystal Dangerfield to a 2-Year Deal
February 2, 2023	Signed Kalani Brown to a Training Camp Contract
February 11, 2023	Acquired Diamond DeShields, a 2023 First-Round Pick (from Chicago), a 2024 First-Round Pick (from Chicago), and the right to swap 2025 First-Round Picks (from Chicago) in a 4-Team Trade involving the Chicago Sky, New York Liberty, and Phoenix Mercury
February 22, 2023	Exercised the 4th Year Option on Awak Kuier
February 28, 2023	Signed Kitija Laksa
April 12, 2023	Signed Maddy Siegrist to a Rookie Scale Contract
April 13, 2023	Signed Lou Lopez Sénéchal and Abby Meyers to Rookie Scale Contracts
April 15, 2023	Signed Ashley Joens to a Rookie Scale Contract
May 10, 2023	Suspended the contract of Kitija Laksa for the full season due to Overseas Commitments
May 15, 2023	Waived Abby Meyers
May 16, 2023	Declined Team Option on Charli Collier
May 17, 2023	Waived Kalani Brown and Charli Collier
May 30, 2023	Signed Kalani Brown to a Hardship Contract
June 2, 2023	Temporarily suspended the contract of Teaira McCowan due to Overseas Commitments
June 6, 2023	Signed Odyssey Sims to a Hardship Contract
June 15, 2023	Released Odyssey Sims from the Hardship Contract
June 20, 2023	Activated Teaira McCowan from her temporary contract suspension due to Overseas Commitments
June 28, 2023	Signed Odyssey Sims
June 28, 2023	Waived Jasmine Dickey and Ashley Joens
June 28, 2023	Released Kalani Brown from her Hardship Contract
June 29, 2023	Signed Kalani Brown to a Hardship Contract
August 6, 2023	Signed Ashley Joens to a 7-Day Contract

=== Roster Changes ===
==== Additions ====
Personnel	Signed/Trade	Former team
Natasha Howard	Trade	New York Liberty
Crystal Dangerfield	Trade	New York Liberty
Diamond DeShields	Trade	Phoenix Mercury
Kalani Brown	Free Agency	Maccabi Bnot Ashdod
Lou Lopez Sénéchal	Draft Pick	2023 Draft Pick
Maddy Siegrist	Draft Pick	2023 Draft Pick
Odyssey Sims	Free Agency	Connecticut Sun

==== Subtractions ====
Personnel	Reason	New team
Kayla Thornton	Traded	New York Liberty
Tyasha Harris	Traded	Connecticut Sun
Allisha Gray	Traded	Atlanta Dream
Isabelle Harrison	Free Agency	Chicago Sky
Marina Mabrey	Trade	Chicago Sky
Charli Collier	Waived	-
Jasmine Dickey	Waived	-

== Roster ==
2023 Dallas Wings roster
Players
Coaches

Pos.	No.	Nat.	Name	Height	Weight	DOB	From	Yrs
C	21	(United States)	Brown, Kalani	6' 7" (2.01m)	245 lb (111kg)	1997-03-21	Baylor	3
G	12	(United States)	Burton, Veronica	5' 9" (1.75m)	155 lb (70kg)	2000-07-12	Northwestern	1
G	11	(United States)	Dangerfield, Crystal	5' 5" (1.65m)	130 lb (59kg)	1998-05-11	Connecticut	3
G	88	(United States)	DeShields, Diamond (injured)	6' 1" (1.85m)	172 lb (78kg)	1995-03-05	Tennessee	5
F	6	(United States)	Howard, Natasha	6' 2" (1.88m)	165 lb (75kg)	1991-09-02	Florida State	9
F/C	28	(Finland)	Kuier, Awak	6' 4" (1.93m)	168 lb (76kg)	2001-08-19	Finland	2
G	8	(Mexico)	Lopez Sénéchal, Lou (injured)	6' 1" (1.85m)	155 lb (70kg)	1998-05-12	Connecticut	R
C	7	(United States)	McCowan, Teaira	6' 7" (2.01m)	239 lb (108kg)	1996-09-28	Mississippi State	4
G	24	(United States)	Ogunbowale, Arike	5' 8" (1.73m)	165 lb (75kg)	1997-03-02	Notre Dame	4
F	0	(Germany)	Sabally, Satou	6' 4" (1.93m)	175 lb (79kg)	1998-04-25	Oregon	3
F	20	(United States)	Siegrist, Maddy	6' 2" (1.88m)	175 lb (79kg)	2000-05-22	Villanova	R
G	2	(United States)	Sims, Odyssey	5' 8" (1.73m)	155 lb (70kg)	1993-07-13	Baylor	10
G	–	(United States)	Robinson, Paige (DP)	5' 11" (1.8m)		2000-07-24	Illinois State	–

Head coach
(United States) Latricia Trammell (East Central)
Assistant coaches
(United States) Brandi Poole (Sewanee)
(United States) April Schilling (Tennessee)
(United States) Courtney Paris (Oklahoma)
Athletic trainer
(United States) Branay Hicks (UT Tyler)

Legend

- (C) Team captain
- (DP) Unsigned draft pick
- (FA) Free agent
- (S) Suspended
- Injured

=== Depth ===
Pos.	Starter	Bench
PG	Crystal Dangerfield	Veronica Burton; Odyssey Sims
SG	Arike Ogunbowale	Lou Lopez Sénéchal
SF	Satou Sabally	Diamond DeShields
PF	Natasha Howard	Awak Kuier; Maddy Siegrist
C	Teaira McCowan	Kalani Brown

== Schedule ==
=== Preseason ===
2023 pre-season game log
Total: 1–1 (Home: 1–0; Road: 0–1)
May: 1–1 (Home: 1–0; Road: 0–1)

Game	Date	Team	Score	High points	High rebounds	High assists	Location Attendance	Record
1	May 5	Chicago	W 75–70	Teaira McCowan (17)	Howard; McCowan (8)	Burton; Dangerfield (4)	College Park Center; 2,004	1–0
2	May 13	@ Indiana	L 83–90	Ogunbowale; Sabally (18)	Satou Sabally (9)	Burton; Howard; McCowan; Ogunbowale; Sabally (3)	Gainbridge Fieldhouse; 2,084	1–1

2023 pre-season schedule

=== Regular season ===
2023 game log
Total: 22–18 (Home: 11–9; Road: 11–9)
May: 3–1 (Home: 2–0; Road: 1–1)

Game	Date	Team	Score	High points	High rebounds	High assists	Location Attendance	Record
1	May 20	Atlanta	W 85–78	Arike Ogunbowale (27)	Natasha Howard (10)	Howard; Sabally (3)	College Park Center; 5,588	1–0
2	May 26	@ Seattle	W 95–91	Arike Ogunbowale (26)	Satou Sabally (10)	Arike Ogunbowale (6)	Climate Pledge Arena; 8,277	2–0
3	May 28	@ Chicago	L 88–94	Arike Ogunbowale (27)	Satou Sabally (8)	Veronica Burton (6)	Wintrust Arena; 6,042	2–1
4	May 30	Minnesota	W 94–89	Natasha Howard (25)	Satou Sabally (11)	Veronica Burton (9)	College Park Center; 3,484	3–1

June : 4–7 (Home: 3–2; Road: 1–5)

Game	Date	Team	Score	High points	High rebounds	High assists	Location Attendance	Record
5	June 2	@ Washington	L 74–75	Ogunbowale; Sabally (18)	Satou Sabally (14)	Satou Sabally (7)	Entertainment and Sports Arena; 3,294	3–2
6	June 4	@ Connecticut	L 74–80	Satou Sabally (26)	Satou Sabally (14)	Veronica Burton (7)	Mohegan Sun Arena; 5,012	3–3
7	June 7	Phoenix	W 84–79	Satou Sabally (24)	Kalani Brown (15)	Odyssey Sims (6)	College Park Center; 4,242	4–3
8	June 9	Phoenix	W 90–77	Arike Ogunbowale (35)	Satou Sabally (16)	Odyssey Sims (7)	College Park Center; 6,251	5–3
9	June 11	@ New York	L 93–102	Arike Ogunbowale (25)	Satou Sabally (11)	Odyssey Sims (8)	Barclays Center; 7,615	5–4
10	June 14	Los Angeles	L 61–79	Kalani Brown (21)	Satou Sabally (13)	Burton; Sabally (4)	College Park Center; 5,807	5–5
11	June 17	Seattle	L 103–109	Arike Ogunbowale (41)	Natasha Howard (10)	Satou Sabally (5)	College Park Center; 5,020	5–6
12	June 20	Atlanta	W 85–73	Natasha Howard (23)	Kalani Brown (14)	Crystal Dangerfield (5)	College Park Center; 3,392	6–6
13	June 23	@ Los Angeles	L 74–76	Natasha Howard (23)	Natasha Howard (12)	Arike Ogunbowale (4)	Crypto.com Arena; 5,766	6–7
14	June 25	@ Los Angeles	L 83–93	Crystal Dangerfield (18)	Teaira McCowan (9)	Arike Ogunbowale (8)	Crypto.com Arena; 6,380	6–8
15	June 27	@ Phoenix	W 77–62	Arike Ogunbowale (23)	Satou Sabally (12)	Satou Sabally (6)	Footprint Center; 5,652	7–8

July : 7–3 (Home: 4–1; Road: 3–2)

Game	Date	Team	Score	High points	High rebounds	High assists	Location Attendance	Record
16	July 2	Washington	W 89–72	Satou Sabally (27)	Satou Sabally (15)	Arike Ogunbowale (5)	College Park Center; 4,544	8–8
17	July 5	@ Las Vegas	L 82–89	Natasha Howard (32)	Natasha Howard (13)	Arike Ogunbowale (7)	Michelob Ultra Arena; 10,177	8–9
18	July 7	Las Vegas	W 80–78	Arike Ogunbowale (21)	Teaira McCowan (12)	Crystal Dangerfield (6)	College Park Center; 6,251	9–9
19	July 9	@ Indiana	W 77–76	Arike Ogunbowale (28)	Natasha Howard (8)	Howard; McCowan; Sims (5)	Gainbridge Fieldhouse; 3,612	10–9
20	July 12	@ Minnesota	W 107–67	Natasha Howard (28)	Natasha Howard (14)	Arike Ogunbowale (11)	Target Center; 13,531	11–9
21	July 19	@ New York	W 98–88	Arike Ogunbowale (25)	Teaira McCowan (12)	Dangerfield; Sabally (7)	Barclays Center; 9,012	12–9
22	July 22	Los Angeles	W 98–84	Natasha Howard (28)	Howard; Sabally (11)	Dangerfield; Sabally (6)	College Park Center; 5,041	13–9
23	July 25	Connecticut	L 83–88	Arike Ogunbowale (25)	Teaira McCowan (15)	Burton; Howard; Ogunbowale; Sabally (3)	College Park Center; 4,222	13–10
24	July 28	Washington	W 90–62	McCowan; Ogunbowale (18)	Satou Sabally (11)	Satou Sabally (10)	College Park Center; 4,048	14–10
25	July 30	@ Las Vegas	L 91–104	Teaira McCowan (25)	Teaira McCowan (14)	Arike Ogunbowale (5)	Michelob Ultra Arena; 10,213	14–11

August : 5–5 (Home: 1–4; Road: 4–1)

Game	Date	Team	Score	High points	High rebounds	High assists	Location Attendance	Record
26	August 2	@ Seattle	W 76–65	Arike Ogunbowale (27)	Natasha Howard (12)	Dangerfield; Ogunbowale (4)	Climate Pledge Arena; 7,421	15–11
27	August 4	Chicago	L 89–104	Natasha Howard (28)	Natasha Howard (12)	Natasha Howard (11)	College Park Center; 3,762	15–12
28	August 6	Chicago	L 96–104	Satou Sabally (25)	Teaira McCowan (9)	Satou Sabally (8)	College Park Center; 4,057	15–13
29	August 8	Las Vegas	L 84–104	Satou Sabally (21)	Kalani Brown (7)	Veronica Burton (5)	College Park Center; 5,193	15–14
30	August 12	Connecticut	W 91–81	Satou Sabally (28)	Satou Sabally (8)	Teaira McCowan (6)	College Park Center; 4,179	16–14
31	August 18	@ Connecticut	W 95–75	Arike Ogunbowale (30)	Teaira McCowan (11)	Satou Sabally (5)	Mohegan Sun Arena; 6,584	17–14
32	August 20	@ Washington	W 97–84	Arike Ogunbowale (17)	Teaira McCowan (13)	Satou Sabally (10)	Entertainment and Sports Arena; 4,200	18–14
33	August 22	@ Minnesota	L 86–91	Satou Sabally (22)	Teaira McCowan (16)	Ogunbowale; Sabally (7)	Target Center; 6,921	18–15
34	August 24	Minnesota	L 81–90	Teaira McCowan (23)	Teaira McCowan (18)	Brown; Dangerfield (4)	College Park Center; 3,931	18–16
35	August 27	@ Phoenix	W 77–74	Arike Ogunbowale (29)	Awak Kuier (9)	Natasha Howard (3)	Footprint Center; 12,163	19–16

September : 3–2 (Home: 1–2; Road: 2–0)

Game	Date	Team	Score	High points	High rebounds	High assists	Location Attendance	Record
36	September 1	@ Indiana	W 110–100	Satou Sabally (40)	Burton; Sabally (7)	Veronica Burton (8)	Gainbridge Fieldhouse; 3,137	20–16
37	September 3	Indiana	L 84–97 (OT)	Ogunbowale; Sabally (22)	Teaira McCowan (10)	Satou Sabally (5)	College Park Center; 5,058	20–17
38	September 5	New York	W 94–93	Satou Sabally (27)	Teaira McCowan (12)	Dangerfield; Howard; Ogunbowale (5)	College Park Center; 4,195	20–18
39	September 8	Seattle	W 106–91	Natasha Howard (23)	Howard; McCowan (9)	Arike Ogunbowale (10)	College Park Center; 4,546	21–18
40	September 10	@ Atlanta	W 94–77	Arike Ogunbowale (32)	Teaira McCowan (10)	Arike Ogunbowale (6)	Gateway Center Arena; 3,207	22–18

2023 season schedule

=== Playoffs ===
2023 playoff game log
First Round vs. Atlanta
Won Series: 2–0

Game	Date	Team	Score	High points	High rebounds	High assists	Location Attendance	Series
1	September 15	Atlanta	W 94–82	Satou Sabally (32)	Teaira McCowan (14)	Arike Ogunbowale (7)	College Park Center; 5,053	1–0
2	September 19	Atlanta	W 101–74	Arike Ogunbowale (24)	Teaira McCowan (16)	Arike Ogunbowale (7)	College Park Center; 4,798	2–0

Second Round vs. Las Vegas
Lost Series: 0–3

Game	Date	Team	Score	High points	High rebounds	High assists	Location Attendance	Series
1	September 24	@ Las Vegas	L 83–97	Satou Sabally (16)	Teaira McCowan (8)	Satou Sabally (7)	Michelob Ultra Arena; 9,784	0–1
2	September 26	@ Las Vegas	L 84–91	Arike Ogunbowale (24)	Howard; McCowan (10)	Odyssey Sims (5)	Michelob Ultra Arena; 9,286	0–2
3	September 29	Las Vegas	L 61–64	Arike Ogunbowale (18)	Teaira McCowan (15)	Veronica Burton (6)	College Park Center; 6,251	0–3

2023 playoff schedule

== Standings ==
#	Team	W	L	PCT	GB	Conf.	Home	Road	Cup
1	x – Las Vegas Aces	34	6	.850	–	18–2	19–1	15–5	9–1
2	x – New York Liberty	32	8	.800	2	16–4	15–5	17–3	7–3
3	x – Connecticut Sun	27	13	.675	7	14–6	13–7	14–6	7–3
4	x – Dallas Wings	22	18	.550	12	11–9	11–9	11–9	6–4
5	x – Atlanta Dream	19	21	.475	15	11–9	11–9	8–12	6–4
6	x – Minnesota Lynx	19	21	.475	15	12–8	9–11	10–10	5–5
7	x – Washington Mystics	19	21	.475	15	9–11	12–8	7–13	5–5
8	x – Chicago Sky	18	22	.450	16	5–15	7–13	11–9	3–7
9	e – Los Angeles Sparks	17	23	.425	17	9–11	10–10	7–13	5–5
10	e – Indiana Fever	13	27	.325	21	5–15	6–14	7–13	2–8
11	e – Seattle Storm	11	29	.275	23	8–12	4–16	7–13	4–6
12	e – Phoenix Mercury	9	31	.225	25	2–18	8–12	1–19	1–9

Notes

(#) – League Standing
x – Clinched playoff berth
e – Eliminated from postseason contention
Source: Overall standings and Commissioner's Cup Standings

== Playoffs ==
**First round** Best-of-3
**1**	**Las Vegas Aces**	**2**
8	Chicago Sky	0
**4**	**Dallas Wings**	**2**
5	Atlanta Dream	0
**2**	**New York Liberty**	**2**
7	Washington Mystics	0
**3**	**Connecticut Sun**	**2**
6	Minnesota Lynx	1

**Semifinals**; Best-of-5
**1**	**Las Vegas Aces**	**3**
4	Dallas Wings	0
**2**	**New York Liberty**	**3**
3	Connecticut Sun	1

**Finals**; Best-of-5
1	**Las Vegas Aces**	**3**
2	New York Liberty	1

- **Bold** – Series winner
- Italic – Team with home-court advantage

== Statistics ==
Legend
GP	Games played	GS	Games started	MPG	Minutes per game	RPG	Rebounds per game
APG	Assists per game	SPG	Steals per game	BPG	Blocks per game	PPG	Points per game
FG%	Field-goal percentage	3P%	3-point field-goal percentage	FT%	Free-throw percentage	TO	Turnovers per game
PF	Fouls per game		Team leader		League leader

=== Regular season ===
Player	GP	GS	MPG	FG%	3P%	FT%	RPG	APG	SPG	BPG	PPG
Arike Ogunbowale	40	40	37.2	.398	.343	.876	3.4	4.5	1.7	0.1	21.2
Satou Sabally	38	38	33.1	.435	.361	.874	8.1	4.4	1.8	0.4	18.6
Natasha Howard	39	39	33.1	.458	.299	.815	8.0	2.6	1.3	1.2	16.5
Teaira McCowan	30	29	26.1	.551	.000	.586	9.1	1.5	0.5	1.2	11.9
Crystal Dangerfield	35	32	27.8	.425	.290	.815	2.9	3.1	0.9	0.2	8.2
Kalani Brown^{≠}	32	5	16.4	.629	.000	.802	4.5	1.0	0.2	0.7	7.8
Maddy Siegrist	39	0	8.2	.509	.333	.931	1.6	0.2	0.2	0.2	3.7
Awak Kuier	37	4	10.8	.396	.087	.778	2.5	0.5	0.2	0.6	2.6
Veronica Burton	40	13	13.9	.294	.271	.912	1.8	2.2	0.7	0.3	2.4
Jasmine Dickey^{‡}	14	0	6.2	.382	.000	.500	0.8	0.1	0.3	0.1	2.1
Odyssey Sims^{≠}	28	0	12.0	.304	.133	.550	1.3	2.2	0.4	0.0	2.0
Ashley Joens^{‡}	9	0	1.6	.250	.000	.250	0.2	0.0	0.1	0.0	0.3

^{‡}Waived/Released during the season
^{†}Traded during the season
^{≠}Acquired during the season

=== Playoffs ===
Player	GP	GS	MPG	FG%	3P%	FT%	RPG	APG	SPG	BPG	PPG
Arike Ogunbowale	5	5	37.8	.388	.351	.643	4.8	5.2	1.6	0.0	19.6
Satou Sabally	5	5	33.6	.359	.391	.778	5.2	4.2	1.4	1.2	15.8
Natasha Howard	5	5	34.2	.364	.350	.833	8.4	2.2	1.6	1.4	12.0
Teaira McCowan	5	5	30.4	.622	0.0	.522	12.6	1.6	0.8	1.4	11.6
Odyssey Sims	5	2	18.6	.406	.333	.600	1.0	2.4	0.8	0.0	6.4
Kalani Brown	5	0	8.6	.583	0.0	.400	2.2	0.4	0.6	0.2	6.0
Crystal Dangerfield	5	3	11.6	.533	.333	1.00	1.4	1.0	0.2	0.0	4.6
Awak Kuier	5	0	10.4	.643	.286	.000	1.4	0.2	0.6	0.8	4.0
Maddy Siegrist	4	0	4.8	.667	1.0	1.0	1.0	0.0	0.3	0.0	3.5
Veronica Burton	5	0	11.0	.154	.111	.800	1.2	2.2	1.6	0.0	1.8

== Awards and honors ==
Recipient	Award	Date awarded	Ref.
Arike Ogunbowale	Western Conference Player of the Week	May 30	
Arike Ogunbowale	Player of the Month - May	June 2	
Arike Ogunbowale	WNBA All-Star Starter	June 25	
Satou Sabally	Western Conference Player of the Week	June 13	
Satou Sabally	WNBA All-Star Starter	June 25	
Satou Sabally	Most Improved Player	September 21	
Satou Sabally	All-WNBA First Team	October 15	
Natasha Howard	Western Conference Player of the Week	July 13	
