= 2023 Indiana Fever season =

- Head coach: Christie Sides
- Arena: Gainbridge Fieldhouse

Results
- Record: 13–27 (.325)
- Place: 6th (Eastern)
- Playoff finish: Did Not Qualify

The 2023 Indiana Fever season was the franchise's 24th season in the Women's National Basketball Association, and their first season under new head coach Christie Sides.

The Fever named Sides their new head coach on November 4, 2022. She previously spent two seasons in Indiana as an assistant coach from 2018 to 2019.

The Fever won the 2023 WNBA draft Lottery and were awarded the first overall pick for the first time in franchise history, where the team selected Aliyah Boston.

The Fever started the season slowly going 1–3 in May, with their one win coming against Atlanta. The Fever showed improvement in June, finishing the season 4–7. However, they won four of six games in the middle of the month and took Chicago to overtime. Their improvement did not persist into July however, as the team went 1–9, including an eight-game losing streak that spanned June and July. The team turned their fortunes around in August and finished 5–5. The team did lose five of six games in the middle of the month, but finished the month on a three-game winning streak. The Fever finished September 2–3, with both wins coming against playoff teams. Their .325 winning percentage was the best since 2019 and their thirteen wins were the most since 2019.

== Transactions ==
=== WNBA draft ===
Round	Pick	Player	Nationality	School/Team/Country
1	1	Aliyah Boston	United States	South Carolina
1	7	Grace Berger	United States	Indiana
2	13	Taylor Mikesell	United States	Ohio State
2	17	LaDazhia Williams	United States	LSU
3	25	Victaria Saxton	United States	South Carolina

=== Transactions ===
Date	Transaction
November 4, 2022	Hired Christie Sides as Head Coach
January 4, 2023	Waived Florencia Chagas
January 11, 2023	Extended Qualifying Offers to Emma Cannon, Victoria Vivians, Khayla Pointer, Rennia Davis, and Temi Fagbenle
January 13, 2023	Traded Danielle Robinson to the Atlanta Dream in exchange for Kristy Wallace
January 20, 2023	Extended General Manager Contract for Lin Dunn and removed her Interim Tag. Promoted Hillary Spears to Assistant GM.
February 1, 2023	Signed Erica Wheeler to a 2-Year Deal
February 2, 2023	Signed Maya Caldwell to a 1-Year Deal
February 2, 2023	Signed Chelsey Perry, Rennia Davis, and Khayla Pointer to Training Camp Contracts
February 5, 2023	Signed Victoria Vivians
February 8, 2023	Signed Emma Cannon to a 1-Year Deal
February 15, 2023	Signed Bernadett Határ to a Training Camp Contract
March 29, 2023	Hired Paul Miller as Assistant Coach
April 6, 2023	Waived Khayla Pointer
April 14, 2023	Signed Grace Berger, Taylor Mikesell, LaDazhia Williams, and Victaria Saxton to Rookie Scale Contracts
April 17, 2023	Signed Aliyah Boston to a Rookie Scale Contract
April 23, 2023	Waived Chelsey Perry
April 26, 2023	Waived Emily Engstler
May 3, 2023	Waived Rennia Davis
May 9, 2023	Waived LaDazhia Williams
May 16, 2023	Waived Destanni Henderson
May 17, 2023	Waived Taylor Mikesell
May 18, 2023	Temporarily suspend the contract of Bernadett Határ due to Overseas Commitments
June 8, 2023	Waived Bernadett Határ
July 4, 2023	Traded Queen Egbo to the Washington Mystics in exchange for Amanda Zahui B

=== Roster Changes ===
==== Additions ====
Personnel	Signed	Former team
Kristy Wallace	Trade	Atlanta Dream
Erica Wheeler	Free Agency	Atlanta Dream
Maya Caldwell	Free Agency	Atlanta Dream
Grace Berger	Draft Pick	2023 Draft Pick
Aliyah Boston	Draft Pick	2023 Draft Pick
Victaria Saxton	Draft Pick	2023 Draft Pick
Amanda Zahui B	Trade	Washington Mystics

==== Subtractions ====
Personnel	Reason	New team
Danielle Robinson	Trade	Atlanta Dream
Tiffany Mitchell	Free Agency	Minnesota Lynx
Rennia Davis	Waived	-
Khayla Pointer	Waived	-
Emily Engstler	Waived	Minnesota Lynx
Destanni Henderson	Waived	Los Angeles Sparks
Queen Egbo	Trade	Washington Mystics

== Roster ==
2023 Indiana Fever roster
Players
Coaches

Pos.	No.	Nat.	Name	Height	Weight	DOB	From	Yrs
G	34	(United States)	Berger, Grace	6' 0" (1.83m)	160 lb (73kg)	1999-06-03	Indiana	R
F/C	7	(United States)	Boston, Aliyah	6' 5" (1.96m)	220 lb (100kg)	2001-12-11	South Carolina	R
G	11	(United States)	Caldwell, Maya	5' 11" (1.8m)	160 lb (73kg)	1998-12-15	Georgia	1
F	32	(United States)	Cannon, Emma	6' 2" (1.88m)	190 lb (86kg)	1989-06-01	Florida Southern	4
G	10	(United States)	Hull, Lexie	6' 1" (1.85m)	155 lb (70kg)	1999-09-13	Stanford	1
G	0	(United States)	Mitchell, Kelsey	5' 8" (1.73m)	160 lb (73kg)	1995-11-12	Ohio State	5
F	5	(United States)	Saxton, Victaria	6' 2" (1.88m)	181 lb (82kg)	1999-11-10	South Carolina	R
F	1	(United States)	Smith, NaLyssa	6' 4" (1.93m)	185 lb (84kg)	2000-08-08	Baylor	1
G	35	(United States)	Vivians, Victoria	6' 1" (1.85m)	183 lb (83kg)	1994-11-17	Mississippi State	4
G	3	(Australia)	Wallace, Kristy	5' 11" (1.8m)	157 lb (71kg)	1996-01-03	Baylor	1
G	17	(United States)	Wheeler, Erica	5' 7" (1.7m)	143 lb (65kg)	1991-05-02	Rutgers	7
F/C	30	(Sweden)	Zahui B., Amanda	6' 5" (1.96m)	184 lb (83kg)	1993-09-08	Minnesota	7

Head coach
(United States) Christie Sides (Louisiana Tech)
Assistant coaches
(United States) Jessie Miller (UIC)
(United States) Karima Christmas-Kelly (Duke)
(United States) Paul Miller (Lake Forest College)
Athletic trainer
(United States) Garrett Hueber
Strength and conditioning coach
(United States) Shannon Patterson

Legend

- (C) Team captain
- (DP) Unsigned draft pick
- (FA) Free agent
- (S) Suspended
- Injured

=== Depth ===
Pos.	Starter	Bench
PG	Erica Wheeler	Kristy Wallace; Grace Berger
SG	Kelsey Mitchell	Maya Caldwell
SF	Lexie Hull	Victoria Vivians
PF	NaLyssa Smith	Emma Cannon; Victaria Saxton
C	Aliyah Boston	Amanda Zahui B.

== Schedule ==
=== Preseason ===
2023 pre-season game log
Total: 1–1 (Home: 1–0; Road: 0–1)
May: 1–1 (Home: 1–0; Road: 0–1)

Game	Date	Team	Score	High points	High rebounds	High assists	Location Attendance	Record
1	May 7	@ Chicago	L 56–81	Kelsey Mitchell (9)	NaLyssa Smith (5)	Destanni Henderson (3)	Wintrust Arena; 2,024	0–1
2	May 13	Dallas	W 90–83	Kelsey Mitchell (29)	Queen Egbo (9)	Erica Wheeler (9)	Gainbridge Fieldhouse; 2,084	1–1

2023 pre-season schedule

=== Regular season ===
2023 game log
Total: 13–27 (Home: 6–14; Road: 7–13)
May: 1–3 (Home: 0–1; Road: 1–2)

Game	Date	Team	Score	High points	High rebounds	High assists	Location Attendance	Record
1	May 19	Connecticut	L 61–70	Kelsey Mitchell (20)	Boston; Smith (9)	Erica Wheeler (5)	Gainbridge Fieldhouse; 7,356	0–1
2	May 21	@ New York	L 73–90	NaLyssa Smith (16)	NaLyssa Smith (12)	Kelsey Mitchell (3)	Barclays Center; 8,575	0–2
3	May 28	@ Atlanta	W 90–87	NaLyssa Smith (23)	NaLyssa Smith (12)	Erica Wheeler (4)	Gateway Center Arena; 3,209	1–2
4	May 30	@ Connecticut	L 78–81	Aliyah Boston (20)	NaLyssa Smith (15)	Erica Wheeler (7)	Mohegan Sun Arena; 5,317	1–3

June : 4–7 (Home: 1–3; Road: 3–4)

Game	Date	Team	Score	High points	High rebounds	High assists	Location Attendance	Record
5	June 4	Las Vegas	L 80–84	Kelsey Mitchell (22)	Queen Egbo (10)	Berger; Vivians (4)	Gainbridge Fieldhouse; 6,131	1–4
6	June 6	@ Chicago	L 103–108 (OT)	Aliyah Boston (25)	Aliyah Boston (11)	Erica Wheeler (12)	Wintrust Arena; 5,201	1–5
7	June 9	@ Minnesota	W 71–69	Kelsey Mitchell (22)	NaLyssa Smith (12)	Grace Berger (4)	Target Center; 8,510	2–5
8	June 11	Phoenix	L 82–85	NaLyssa Smith (29)	NaLyssa Smith (12)	Erica Wheeler (8)	Gainbridge Fieldhouse; 5,013	2–6
9	June 13	Washington	W 87–66	Aliyah Boston (23)	Aliyah Boston (14)	Aliyah Boston (6)	Gainbridge Fieldhouse; 3,005	3–6
10	June 15	@ Chicago	W 92–90	Aliyah Boston (19)	Boston; Smith (8)	Kelsey Mitchell (5)	Wintrust Arena; 6,323	4–6
11	June 18	Atlanta	L 94–100	Aliyah Boston (25)	NaLyssa Smith (7)	Erica Wheeler (8)	Gainbridge Fieldhouse; 4,024	4–7
12	June 22	@ Seattle	W 80–68	Kelsey Mitchell (25)	NaLyssa Smith (14)	Boston; Wallace; Wheeler (5)	Climate Pledge Arena; 7,734	5–7
13	June 24	@ Las Vegas	L 88–101	NaLyssa Smith (26)	NaLyssa Smith (11)	Wallace; Wheeler (6)	Michelob Ultra Arena; 8,310	5–8
14	June 26	@ Las Vegas	L 80–88	Boston; Wheeler (20)	Boston; Smith (14)	Boston; Wheeler (3)	Michelob Ultra Arena	5–9
15	June 29	@ Phoenix	L 63–85	Kelsey Mitchell (15)	Boston; Smith (9)	Boston; Mitchell; Wheeler (4)	Footprint Center; 9,047	5–10

July : 1–9 (Home: 0–4; Road: 1–5)

Game	Date	Team	Score	High points	High rebounds	High assists	Location Attendance	Record
16	July 2	Chicago	L 87–89	NaLyssa Smith (27)	NaLyssa Smith (8)	Kelsey Mitchell (8)	Gainbridge Fieldhouse; 4,004	5–11
17	July 5	@ Minnesota	L 83–90	Aliyah Boston (22)	NaLyssa Smith (11)	Erica Wheeler (7)	Target Center; 7,624	5–12
18	July 7	@ Washington	L 88–96	Lexie Hull (20)	Boston; Smith (7)	Erica Wheeler (7)	Entertainment and Sports Arena; 4,200	5–13
19	July 9	Dallas	L 76–77	Aliyah Boston (18)	Aliyah Boston (8)	Kelsey Mitchell (4)	Gainbridge Fieldhouse; 3,612	5–14
20	July 12	New York	L 87–95 (OT)	Aliyah Boston (23)	Boston; Vivians (9)	Erica Wheeler (5)	Gainbridge Fieldhouse; 6,123	5–15
21	July 19	Washington	W 82–76	Kelsey Mitchell (18)	Aliyah Boston (8)	Kelsey Mitchell (5)	Gainbridge Fieldhouse; 14,406	6–15
22	July 23	@ New York	L 83–101	Victoria Vivians (16)	Caldwell; Vivians (5)	Grace Berger (5)	Barclays Center; 7,371	6–16
23	July 25	@ Los Angeles	L 78–79	Kelsey Mitchell (19)	Vivians; Zahui B. (6)	Erica Wheeler (8)	Crypto.com Arena; 5,565	6–17
24	July 27	@ Los Angeles	L 68–81	Erica Wheeler (17)	Erica Wheeler (8)	Erica Wheeler (7)	Crypto.com Arena; 11,970	6–18
25	July 30	Seattle	L 62–85	Kelsey Mitchell (19)	Aliyah Boston (7)	Mitchell; Wheeler (5)	Gainbridge Fieldhouse; 5,196	6–19

August : 5–5 (Home: 4–4; Road: 1–1)

Game	Date	Team	Score	High points	High rebounds	High assists	Location Attendance	Record
26	August 1	Phoenix	W 72–71	Emma Cannon (23)	Aliyah Boston (11)	Aliyah Boston (4)	Gainbridge Fieldhouse; 3,018	7–19
27	August 4	Connecticut	L 72–88	Aliyah Boston (19)	Aliyah Boston (8)	Boston; Wheeler (4)	Gainbridge Fieldhouse; 3,498	7–20
28	August 6	@ Atlanta	L 73–82	Aliyah Boston (25)	Aliyah Boston (10)	Erica Wheeler (5)	Gateway Center Arena; 3,209	7–21
29	August 8	Los Angeles	L 80–87	Kelsey Mitchell (21)	Aliyah Boston (9)	Kristy Wallace (7)	Gainbridge Fieldhouse; 3,006	7–22
30	August 10	Minnesota	W 91–73	Kelsey Mitchell (24)	Aliyah Boston (10)	Erica Wheeler (10)	Gainbridge Fieldhouse; 2,551	8–22
31	August 13	New York	L 89–100	Kelsey Mitchell (22)	Boston; Smith (9)	Aliyah Boston (5)	Gainbridge Fieldhouse; 5,019	8–23
32	August 18	Washington	L 79–83	Emma Cannon (17)	Aliyah Boston (10)	Kelsey Mitchell (7)	Gainbridge Fieldhouse; 3,506	8–24
33	August 20	@ Phoenix	W 83–73	Kelsey Mitchell (28)	NaLyssa Smith (11)	Grace Berger (5)	Footprint Center; 11,807	9–24
34	August 24	Seattle	W 90–86	Kelsey Mitchell (36)	NaLyssa Smith (11)	Kristy Wallace (5)	Gainbridge Fieldhouse; 2,644	10–24
35	August 27	Atlanta	W 83–80	Kristy Wallace (20)	NaLyssa Smith (13)	Kelsey Mitchell (6)	Gainbridge Fieldhouse; 4,034	11–24

September : 2–3 (Home: 1–2; Road: 1–1)

Game	Date	Team	Score	High points	High rebounds	High assists	Location Attendance	Record
36	September 1	Dallas	L 100–110	Aliyah Boston (18)	Boston; Smith (11)	Erica Wheeler (10)	Gainbridge Fieldhouse; 3,137	11–25
37	September 3	@ Dallas	W 97–84 (OT)	Mitchell; Smith (30)	Aliyah Boston (11)	Erica Wheeler (11)	College Park Center; 5,058	12–25
38	September 5	Chicago	L 69–96	NaLyssa Smith (16)	NaLyssa Smith (7)	Grace Berger (6)	Gainbridge Fieldhouse; 2,450	12–26
39	September 8	@ Connecticut	L 59–76	Kelsey Mitchell (15)	Aliyah Boston (7)	Erica Wheeler (3)	Mohegan Sun Arena; 5,064	12–27
40	September 10	Minnesota	W 87–72	Kelsey Mitchell (24)	Aliyah Boston (12)	Smith; Wheeler (3)	Gainbridge Fieldhouse; 4,009	13–27

2023 season schedule

== Standings ==
#	Team	W	L	PCT	GB	Conf.	Home	Road	Cup
1	x – Las Vegas Aces	34	6	.850	–	18–2	19–1	15–5	9–1
2	x – New York Liberty	32	8	.800	2	16–4	15–5	17–3	7–3
3	x – Connecticut Sun	27	13	.675	7	14–6	13–7	14–6	7–3
4	x – Dallas Wings	22	18	.550	12	11–9	11–9	11–9	6–4
5	x – Atlanta Dream	19	21	.475	15	11–9	11–9	8–12	6–4
6	x – Minnesota Lynx	19	21	.475	15	12–8	9–11	10–10	5–5
7	x – Washington Mystics	19	21	.475	15	9–11	12–8	7–13	5–5
8	x – Chicago Sky	18	22	.450	16	5–15	7–13	11–9	3–7
9	e – Los Angeles Sparks	17	23	.425	17	9–11	10–10	7–13	5–5
10	e – Indiana Fever	13	27	.325	21	5–15	6–14	7–13	2–8
11	e – Seattle Storm	11	29	.275	23	8–12	4–16	7–13	4–6
12	e – Phoenix Mercury	9	31	.225	25	2–18	8–12	1–19	1–9

Notes

(#) – League Standing
x – Clinched playoff berth
e – Eliminated from postseason contention
Source: Overall standings and Commissioner's Cup Standings

== Statistics ==
Legend
GP	Games played	GS	Games started	MPG	Minutes per game	RPG	Rebounds per game
APG	Assists per game	SPG	Steals per game	BPG	Blocks per game	PPG	Points per game
FG%	Field-goal percentage	3P%	3-point field-goal percentage	FT%	Free-throw percentage	TO	Turnovers per game
PF	Fouls per game		Team leader		League leader

=== Regular season ===
Player	GP	GS	MPG	FG%	3P%	FT%	RPG	APG	SPG	BPG	PPG
Kelsey Mitchell	40	40	33.7	.441	.398	.824	1.6	3.1	0.9	0.1	18.2
NaLyssa Smith	31	28	28.5	.477	.284	.677	9.2	1.4	0.3	0.3	15.5
Aliyah Boston	40	40	31.2	.578	.400	.745	8.4	2.2	1.3	1.3	14.5
Erica Wheeler	40	40	26.8	.398	.309	.878	3.0	5.0	1.1	0.1	9.9
Kristy Wallace	37	9	19.7	.401	.435	.750	2.2	1.9	0.6	0.2	6.6
Emma Cannon	30	3	10.5	.455	.382	.909	3.1	0.5	0.1	0.1	5.8
Victoria Vivians	38	14	17.7	.380	.287	.767	3.1	1.3	0.7	0.2	5.2
Lexie Hull	30	25	20.6	.372	.217	.773	2.7	1.1	1.0	0.3	4.6
Grace Berger	36	0	14.6	.449	.471	.840	1.6	1.9	0.5	0.2	4.2
Queen Egbo^{†}	16	0	8.9	.400	.000	.647	4.0	0.1	0.1	0.5	2.9
Maya Caldwell	30	1	10.1	.292	.138	.857	0.9	0.6	0.3	0.1	1.9
Amanda Zahui B.^{≠}	22	0	7.3	.261	.130	.750	1.0	0.3	0.1	0.5	1.5
Victaria Saxton	15	0	3.6	.333	.500	.857	0.7	0.0	0.1	0.0	1.3

^{‡}Waived/Released during the season
^{†}Traded during the season
^{≠}Acquired during the season

== Awards and honors ==
Recipient	Award	Date awarded	Ref.
Aliyah Boston	Rookie of the Month - May	June 2	
Aliyah Boston	Eastern Conference Player of the Week	June 20	
Aliyah Boston	WNBA All-Star Starter	June 25	
Aliyah Boston	Rookie of the Month - June	July 5	
Aliyah Boston	Rookie of the Month - August	September 6	
Aliyah Boston	WNBA Rookie of the Year	October 2	
Aliyah Boston	WNBA All-Rookie Team	October 2	
Kelsey Mitchell	WNBA All-Star	July 1	
Kelsey Mitchell	Eastern Conference Player of the Week	August 29	
