= 2023 Washington Mystics season =

- Head coach: Eric Thibault
- Arena: Entertainment and Sports Arena

Results
- Record: 19–21 (.475)
- Place: T-3rd (Eastern)
- Playoff finish: 7th seed; Lost 1st Round 0–2 to New York

The 2023 Washington Mystics season was the franchise's 26th season in the Women's National Basketball Association, and their first season under head coach Eric Thibault.

On November 15, 2022, the Mystics announced that former head coach Mike Thibault would be retiring from the coaching side of basketball. He would still retain his General Manager title. They also announced that assistant coach Eric Thibault would be promoted to head coach for the Mystics.

The Mystics earned the fourth overall pick in the 2023 WNBA draft through the Draft Lottery system. They entered the lottery with the third best odds, but fell one spot.

The Mystics started the season off with a win, but then lost their next two games, which were both against Connecticut. After winning their final game, they finished May with a 2–2 record. June began with the Mystics winning three of the first four games. The lost a game before going on a three-game winning streak. They finished the season losing two of their last three games and ended June with a 7–4 record. The team lost two of their first four games in July, before losing five of their last six. They finished July with a 3–7 record. They won their first game in August before a three-game losing streak. They won their next two, but then lost to games, before winning two more games. A loss in the final game of August saw the team finish with a 5–6 record in the month. The Mystics entered September in the hunt for one of the final playoff spots. They began September with a loss, but secured their playoff spot with a win on September 5. They lost their penultimate game of the season, but won their final game to secure the seventh seed.

As the seventh seed in the 2023 WNBA Playoffs they faced off against the second seed New York Liberty. In the first game, New York won by fifteen points, 90–75. Needed to win to keep the series alive, the Mystics forced overtime in New York, but were unable to finish with a win, and lost 85–90 to end their season. This was the second straight season qualifying for the playoffs, and the sixth playoff appearance in seven years for the Mystics.

== Transactions ==
=== WNBA draft ===
Round	Pick	Player	Nationality	School/Team/Country
1	4	Stephanie Soares	Brazil	Iowa State
2	20	Elena Tsineke	Greece	South Florida
3	32	Txell Alarcón	Spain	Araski AES

- Soares was traded on Draft Day to the Dallas Wings in exchange for a future 2024 second-round pick and 2025 first-round draft pick (via Atlanta)

=== Transactions ===
Date	Transaction
November 15, 2022	Head coach Mike Thibault retires from coaching. Thibault will stay on as General Manager.
November 15, 2022	Hired Eric Thibault as Head Coach
November 15, 2022	Promoted LaToya Sanders to Associate Head Coach
November 15, 2022	Promoted Maria Giovannetti to Assistant General Manager/Senior Vice President of Strategy and Vision
January 13, 2023	Extended Qualifying Offers to Rui Machida, Jazmine Jones, and Evina Westbrook
January 20, 2023	Signed Evina Westbrook to her Qualifying Offer - Training Camp Contract
January 23, 2023	Signed Jazmine Jones to a Qualifying Offer - Training Camp Contract
February 1, 2023	Signed Brittney Sykes to a 3-Year Deal
February 1, 2023	Signed Shatori Walker-Kimbrough to a 2-Year Deal
February 1, 2023	Rescinded Qualifying Offer to Rui Machida
February 2, 2023	Signed Tianna Hawkins to a Training Camp Contract
February 2, 2023	Signed Alisia Jenkins to a Training Camp Contract
February 5, 2023	Traded a Second-Round Pick in the 2024 and 2025 WNBA Drafts to the Las Vegas Aces in exchange for the negotiating rights to Amanda Zahui B
February 6, 2023	Signed Stephanie Jones to a Training Camp Contract
February 7, 2023	Signed Amanda Zahui B to a Training Camp Contract
March 13, 2023	Signed Li Meng to a Training Camp Contract
March 21, 2023	Hired Ashlee McGee as Assistant Coach
April 10, 2023	Traded the draft rights to Stephanie Soares to the Dallas Wings in exchange for Dallas's 2024 Second Round Pick and Atlanta's 2025 First Round Pick
April 13, 2023	Signed Elena Tsineke to a Rookie Scale Contract
April 25, 2023	Signed Kristi Toliver
May 1, 2023	Signed Emily Engstler to a Training Camp Contract
May 7, 2023	Waived Evina Westbrook and Alisia Jenkins
May 14, 2023	Waived Stephanie Jones and Elena Tsineke
May 17, 2023	Waived Jazmine Jones and Emily Engstler
June 19, 2023	Temporarily suspend the contract of Li Meng due to Overseas Commitments
June 20, 2023	Signed Abby Meyers to a Hardship Contract
June 30, 2023	Signed Linnae Harper to a Hardship Contract
July 4, 2023	Released Abby Meyers and Linnae Harper from their Hardship Contracts
July 4, 2023	Traded Amanda Zahui B to the Indiana Fever in exchange for Queen Egbo
July 5, 2023	Activated the temporarily suspended contract of Li Meng due to Overseas Commitments
July 5, 2023	Signed Linnae Harper to a Hardship Contract
July 12, 2023	Signed Cyesha Goree to a Hardship Contract
July 21, 2023	Signed Abby Meyers to a 7-Day Contract
July 28, 2023	Signed Abby Meyers to a 2nd 7-Day Contract
August 4, 2023	Signed Abby Meyers to a 3rd 7-Day Contract
August 7, 2023	Released Abby Meyers from the 7-Day Contract
August 12, 2023	Released Linnae Harper from the Hardship Contract
August 13, 2023	Signed Jennie Simms to a 7-Day Contract
August 14, 2023	Released Cyesha Goree from the Hardship Contract
August 15, 2023	Signed Ariel Atkins to a Contract Extension

=== Roster Changes ===
==== Additions ====
Personnel	Signed/Trade	Former team
Brittney Sykes	Free Agency	Los Angeles Sparks
Amanda Zahui B	Trade	Las Vegas Aces
Li Meng	Free Agency	Bayi Kylin
Kristi Toliver	Free Agency	Los Angeles Sparks
Queen Egbo	Trade	Indiana Fever

==== Subtractions ====
Personnel	Reason	New team
Evina Westbrook	Waived	Phoenix Mercury
Alysha Clark	Free Agency	Las Vegas Aces
Jazmine Jones	Waived	-
Rui Machida	Free Agency	-
Elizabeth Williams	Free Agency	Chicago Sky
Amanda Zahui B	Trade	Indiana Fever

== Roster ==
2023 Washington Mystics roster
Players
Coaches

Pos.	No.	Nat.	Name	Height	Weight	DOB	From	Yrs
G	7	(United States)	Atkins, Ariel (injured)	5' 8" (1.73m)	167 lb (76kg)	1996-07-30	Texas	5
C	0	(United States)	Austin, Shakira	6' 5" (1.96m)	190 lb (86kg)	2000-07-25	Mississippi	1
G	9	(United States)	Cloud, Natasha	5' 9" (1.75m)	160 lb (73kg)	1992-02-22	Saint Joseph's	7
G/F	11	(United States)	Delle Donne, Elena (injured)	6' 5" (1.96m)	187 lb (85kg)	1989-09-05	Delaware	9
C	4	(United States)	Egbo, Queen	6' 4" (1.93m)	190 lb (86kg)	2000-06-29	Baylor	1
F	21	(United States)	Hawkins, Tianna	6' 3" (1.91m)	186 lb (84kg)	1991-03-02	Maryland	9
F	2	(United States)	Hines-Allen, Myisha	6' 2" (1.88m)	200 lb (91kg)	1996-05-30	Louisville	5
F	3	(China)	Li Meng	6' 0" (1.83m)	198 lb (90kg)	1995-01-02	China	R
G	15	(United States)	Sykes, Brittney	5' 9" (1.75m)	154 lb (70kg)	1994-02-07	Syracuse	6
G	20	(United States)	Toliver, Kristi (injured)	5' 7" (1.7m)	130 lb (59kg)	1987-01-27	Maryland	13
G	32	(United States)	Walker-Kimbrough, Shatori	5' 9" (1.75m)	140 lb (64kg)	1995-05-18	Maryland	6
G	–	(Spain)	Alarcón, Txell (DP)	5' 10" (1.78m)		2003-07-31	Spain	–

Head coach
(United States) Eric Thibault (Missouri)
Assistant coaches
(United States) LaToya Sanders (North Carolina)
(United States) Shelley Patterson (Washington State)
(United States) Ashlee McGee (Austin Peay)
Athletic trainer
(United States) Christina Kennedy

Legend

- (C) Team captain
- (DP) Unsigned draft pick
- (FA) Free agent
- (S) Suspended
- Injured

=== Depth ===
Pos.	Starter	Bench
PG	Natasha Cloud	Kristi Toliver
SG	Ariel Atkins	Shatori Walker-Kimbrough
SF	Brittney Sykes	Li Meng
PF	Elena Delle Donne	Myisha Hines-Allen; Tianna Hawkins
C	Shakira Austin	Queen Egbo

== Schedule ==
=== Preseason ===
2023 pre-season game log
Total: 1–1 (Home: 1–0; Road: 0–1)
May: 1–1 (Home: 1–0; Road: 0–1)

Game	Date	Team	Score	High points	High rebounds	High assists	Location Attendance	Record
1	May 5	@ Minnesota	69–72	Tianna Hawkins (14)	Stephanie Jones (9)	Natasha Cloud (7)	Target Center; 5,001	0–1
2	May 10	Atlanta	W 88–76	Elena Delle Donne (17)	Tianna Hawkins (10)	Natasha Cloud (5)	Entertainment and Sports Arena; 3,612	1–1

2023 pre-season schedule

=== Regular season ===
2023 game log
Total: 19–21 (Home: 12–8; Road: 7–13)
May: 2–2 (Home: 1–1; Road: 1–1)

Game	Date	Team	Score	High points	High rebounds	High assists	Location Attendance	Record
1	May 19	New York	W 80–64	Atkins; Cloud (14)	Brittney Sykes (9)	Natasha Cloud (6)	Entertainment and Sports Arena; 4,200	1–0
2	May 21	@ Connecticut	L 74–80	Shakira Austin (21)	Austin; Delle Donne (11)	Natasha Cloud (6)	Mohegan Sun Arena; 7,048	1–1
3	May 23	Connecticut	L 81–88	Elena Delle Donne (27)	Shakira Austin (8)	Delle Donne; Sykes (4)	Entertainment and Sports Arena; 3,383	1–2
4	May 26	@ Chicago	W 71–69	Elena Delle Donne (25)	Shakira Austin (10)	Natasha Cloud (7)	Wintrust Arena; 7,304	2–2

June : 7–4 (Home: 4–1; Road: 3–3)

Game	Date	Team	Score	High points	High rebounds	High assists	Location Attendance	Record
5	June 2	Dallas	W 75–74	Elena Delle Donne (23)	Shakira Austin (11)	Natasha Cloud (8)	Entertainment and Sports Arena; 3,294	3–2
6	June 3	Minnesota	L 78–80	Ariel Atkins (18)	Shakira Austin (10)	Natasha Cloud (9)	Entertainment and Sports Arena; 3,534	3–3
7	June 9	@ Seattle	W 73–66	Brittney Sykes (18)	Shakira Austin (11)	Ariel Atkins (6)	Climate Pledge Arena; 8,397	4–3
8	June 11	@ Seattle	W 71–65	Natasha Cloud (19)	Shakira Austin (9)	Natasha Cloud (5)	Climate Pledge Arena; 13,213	5–3
9	June 13	@ Indiana	L 66–87	Elena Delle Donne (17)	Delle Donne; Sykes (6)	Natasha Cloud (5)	Gainbridge Fieldhouse; 3,005	5–4
10	June 16	Phoenix	W 88–69	Elena Delle Donne (17)	Tianna Hawkins (8)	Ariel Atkins (5)	Entertainment and Sports Arena; 4,200	6–4
11	June 18	Chicago	W 77–69	Elena Delle Donne (20)	Delle Donne; Sykes (6)	Natasha Cloud (5)	Entertainment and Sports Arena; 4,009	7–4
12	June 22	@ Chicago	W 80–59	Elena Delle Donne (18)	Brittney Sykes (11)	Brittney Sykes (5)	Wintrust Arena; 6,158	8–4
13	June 25	@ New York	L 88–89 (OT)	Ariel Atkins (24)	Cloud; Delle Donne (6)	Natasha Cloud (11)	Barclays Center; 7,285	8–5
14	June 28	Atlanta	W 109–86	Elena Delle Donne (25)	Tianna Hawkins (11)	Brittney Sykes (10)	Entertainment and Sports Arena; 3,624	9–5
15	June 30	@ Atlanta	L 89–94	Elena Delle Donne (31)	Brittney Sykes (6)	Natasha Cloud (6)	Gateway Center Arena; 3,209	9–6

July : 3–7 (Home: 3–2; Road: 0–5)

Game	Date	Team	Score	High points	High rebounds	High assists	Location Attendance	Record
16	July 2	@ Dallas	L 72–89	Ariel Atkins (20)	Tianna Hawkins (11)	Natasha Cloud (6)	College Park Center; 4,544	9–7
17	July 7	Indiana	W 96–88	Brittney Sykes (29)	Ariel Atkins (10)	Tianna Hawkins (5)	Entertainment and Sports Arena; 4,200	10–7
18	July 9	@ Connecticut	L 84–92	Tianna Hawkins (24)	Queen Egbo (7)	Brittney Sykes (7)	Mohegan Sun Arena; 6,558	10–8
19	July 11	Seattle	W 93–86	Brittney Sykes (26)	Queen Egbo (8)	Natasha Cloud (8)	Entertainment and Sports Arena; 3,571	11–8
20	July 19	Indiana	L 76–82	Natasha Cloud (19)	Tianna Hawkins (9)	Brittney Sykes (7)	Capital One Arena; 14,406	11–9
21	July 21	New York	L 87–96	Brittney Sykes (29)	Brittney Sykes (10)	Natasha Cloud (5)	Entertainment and Sports Arena; 4,200	11–10
22	July 23	Phoenix	W 84–69	Cloud; Sykes (23)	Egbo; Hawkins (7)	Natasha Cloud (9)	Entertainment and Sports Arena; 4,200	12–10
23	July 26	@ Minnesota	L 92–97	Natasha Cloud (24)	Egbo; Hines-Allen (7)	Natasha Cloud (6)	Target Center; 7,024	12–11
24	July 28	@ Dallas	62–90	Shatori Walker-Kimbrough (14)	Brittney Sykes (5)	Brittney Sykes (4)	College Park Center; 4,048	12–12
25	July 30	@ Atlanta	L 73–80	Brittney Sykes (25)	Tianna Hawkins (10)	Natasha Cloud (4)	Gateway Center Arena; 3,209	12–13

August : 5–6 (Home: 4–3; Road: 1–3)

Game	Date	Team	Score	High points	High rebounds	High assists	Location Attendance	Record
26	August 4	Los Angeles	W 79–77	Tianna Hawkins (17)	Egbo; Hines-Allen (9)	Brittney Sykes (8)	Entertainment and Sports Arena; 3,747	13–13
27	August 6	Los Angeles	L 83–91	Tianna Hawkins (23)	Natasha Cloud (6)	Natasha Cloud (7)	Entertainment and Sports Arena; 4,073	13–14
28	August 8	@ Phoenix	L 72–91	Brittney Sykes (24)	Queen Egbo (6)	Myisha Hines-Allen (7)	Footprint Center; 6,610	13–15
29	August 11	@ Las Vegas	L 89–113	Natasha Cloud (21)	Tianna Hawkins (10)	Cloud; Skyes (6)	Michelob Ultra Arena; 9,364	13–16
30	August 13	Chicago	L 76–83	Brittney Sykes (30)	Cloud; Hawkins (6)	Cloud; Sykes (6)	Entertainment and Sports Arena; 3,796	14–16
31	August 18	@ Indiana	W 83–79	Brittney Sykes (30)	Myisha Hines-Allen (6)	Brittney Sykes (4)	Gainbridge Fieldhouse; 3,506	15–16
32	August 20	Dallas	L 84–97	Natasha Cloud (22)	Myisha Hines-Allen (8)	Myisha Hines-Allen (6)	Entertainment and Sports Arena; 4,200	15–17
33	August 22	Connecticut	L 64–68	Natasha Cloud (19)	Queen Egbo (8)	Natasha Cloud (5)	Entertainment and Sports Arena; 3,058	15–18
34	August 26	Las Vegas	W 78–62	Elena Delle Donne (21)	Austin; Delle Donne; Hawkins (7)	Natasha Cloud (9)	Entertainment and Sports Arena; 4,200	16–18
35	August 29	Minnesota	W 83–72	Brittney Sykes (21)	Brittney Sykes (8)	Natasha Cloud (9)	Entertainment and Sports Arena; 3,708	17–18
36	August 31	@ Las Vegas	L 75–84	Elena Delle Donne (17)	Hines-Allen; Sykes (7)	Cloud; Sykes (5)	Michelob Ultra Arena; 8,619	17–19

September : 2–2 (Home: 0–1; Road: 2–1)

Game	Date	Team	Score	High points	High rebounds	High assists	Location Attendance	Record
37	September 3	@ Los Angeles	L 64–72	Brittney Sykes (14)	Hawkins; Hines-Allen (7)	Natasha Cloud (5)	Crypto.com Arena; 4,284	17–20
38	September 5	@ Phoenix	W 100–77	Natasha Cloud (20)	Myisha Hines-Allen (8)	Natasha Cloud (10)	Footprint Center; 7,038	18–20
39	September 8	Atlanta	L 75–80	Brittney Sykes (27)	Myisha Hines-Allen (7)	Natasha Cloud (15)	Entertainment and Sports Arena; 4,210	18–21
40	September 10	@ New York	W 90–88	Brittney Sykes (20)	Brittney Sykes (7)	Brittney Sykes (6)	Barclays Center; 8,306	19–21

2023 season schedule

=== Playoffs ===
2023 playoff game log
First Round vs. New York
Lost Series: 0–2

Game	Date	Team	Score	High points	High rebounds	High assists	Location Attendance	Series
1	September 15	@ New York	L 75–90	Myisha Hines-Allen (21)	Hines-Allen; Cloud (8)	Natasha Cloud (8)	Barclays Center; 8,789	0–1
2	September 19	@ New York	L 85–90 (OT)	Natasha Cloud (33)	Brittney Sykes (12)	Natasha Cloud (9)	Barclays Center; 9,256	0–2

2023 playoff schedule

== Standings ==
#	Team	W	L	PCT	GB	Conf.	Home	Road	Cup
1	x – Las Vegas Aces	34	6	.850	–	18–2	19–1	15–5	9–1
2	x – New York Liberty	32	8	.800	2	16–4	15–5	17–3	7–3
3	x – Connecticut Sun	27	13	.675	7	14–6	13–7	14–6	7–3
4	x – Dallas Wings	22	18	.550	12	11–9	11–9	11–9	6–4
5	x – Atlanta Dream	19	21	.475	15	11–9	11–9	8–12	6–4
6	x – Minnesota Lynx	19	21	.475	15	12–8	9–11	10–10	5–5
7	x – Washington Mystics	19	21	.475	15	9–11	12–8	7–13	5–5
8	x – Chicago Sky	18	22	.450	16	5–15	7–13	11–9	3–7
9	e – Los Angeles Sparks	17	23	.425	17	9–11	10–10	7–13	5–5
10	e – Indiana Fever	13	27	.325	21	5–15	6–14	7–13	2–8
11	e – Seattle Storm	11	29	.275	23	8–12	4–16	7–13	4–6
12	e – Phoenix Mercury	9	31	.225	25	2–18	8–12	1–19	1–9

Notes

(#) – League Standing
x – Clinched playoff berth
e – Eliminated from postseason contention
Source: Overall standings and Commissioner's Cup Standings

== Playoffs ==
**First round** Best-of-3
**1**	**Las Vegas Aces**	**2**
8	Chicago Sky	0
**4**	**Dallas Wings**	**2**
5	Atlanta Dream	0
**2**	**New York Liberty**	**2**
7	Washington Mystics	0
**3**	**Connecticut Sun**	**2**
6	Minnesota Lynx	1

**Semifinals**; Best-of-5
**1**	**Las Vegas Aces**	**3**
4	Dallas Wings	0
**2**	**New York Liberty**	**3**
3	Connecticut Sun	1

**Finals**; Best-of-5
1	**Las Vegas Aces**	**3**
2	New York Liberty	1

- **Bold** – Series winner
- Italic – Team with home-court advantage

== Statistics ==
Legend
GP	Games played	GS	Games started	MPG	Minutes per game	RPG	Rebounds per game
APG	Assists per game	SPG	Steals per game	BPG	Blocks per game	PPG	Points per game
FG%	Field-goal percentage	3P%	3-point field-goal percentage	FT%	Free-throw percentage	TO	Turnovers per game
PF	Fouls per game		Team leader		League leader

=== Regular season ===
Player	GP	GS	MPG	FG%	3P%	FT%	RPG	APG	SPG	BPG	PPG
Elena Delle Donne	23	23	27.5	.485	.393	.938	5.4	2.1	0.8	0.9	16.7
Brittney Sykes	40	40	31.3	.439	.350	.797	5.0	3.8	2.1	0.3	15.9
Natasha Cloud	37	37	32.4	.377	.298	.900	3.7	6.2	1.1	0.3	12.7
Ariel Atkins	27	27	25.1	.414	.339	.897	3.1	2.3	1.2	0.3	11.5
Shakira Austin	19	17	23.2	.500	.000	.610	7.0	0.9	0.8	0.9	10.0
Tianna Hawkins	40	21	23.1	.491	.333	.750	5.0	1.4	0.8	0.4	8.2
Shatori Walker-Kimbrough	40	15	24.8	.429	.390	.936	2.1	1.7	0.7	0.4	6.3
Queen Egbo^{≠}	21	0	15.8	.544	.000	.633	4.4	0.4	0.6	0.7	6.2
Myisha Hines-Allen	35	18	17.6	.340	.273	.717	4.4	2.2	0.7	0.2	5.6
Li Meng	34	1	15.9	.378	.364	.846	1.1	1.0	0.3	0.0	5.6
Cyesha Goree^{‡}	10	0	11.6	.469	.214	.857	1.2	0.1	0.3	0.1	3.9
Kristi Toliver	11	0	9.0	.333	.357	.800	0.7	0.7	0.3	0.0	3.6
Amanda Zahui B.^{†}	12	1	7.8	.250	.214	.750	1.4	0.3	0.3	0.6	2.0
Linnae Harper^{‡}	14	0	5.2	.308	.364	.000	0.6	0.3	0.1	0.0	1.4
Abby Meyers^{‡}	9	0	4.0	.385	.000	1.000	0.4	0.0	0.1	0.2	1.4

^{‡}Waived/Released during the season
^{†}Traded during the season
^{≠}Acquired during the season

=== Playoffs ===
Player	GP	GS	MPG	FG%	3P%	FT%	RPG	APG	SPG	BPG	PPG
Natasha Cloud	2	2	37.0	.433	.500	1.000	7.0	8.5	2.0	0.0	18.5
Myisha Hines-Allen	2	2	29.5	.636	.333	.500	6.0	2.0	0.0	0.0	15.5
Brittney Sykes	2	2	39.0	.414	.222	.500	8.0	3.5	2.0	0.5	15.0
Ariel Atkins	2	2	33.5	.345	.250	1.000	5.5	3.0	2.0	1.5	13.5
Elena Delle Donne	2	2	36.5	.321	.000	1.000	4.5	3.5	0.5	1.0	11.0
Tianna Hawkins	2	0	14.5	.400	.500	.000	1.5	0.5	1.0	1.5	2.5
Shatori Walker-Kimbrough	2	0	11.0	.400	.000	.500	1.5	0.5	1.0	1.5	2.5
Li Meng	2	0	7.0	.200	.250	.000	0.0	0.0	0.5	0.0	1.5
Queen Egbo	2	0	4.5	.000	.000	.000	0.5	0.0	0.0	0.0	0.0

== Awards and honors ==
Recipient	Award	Date awarded	Ref.
Elena Delle Donne	WNBA All-Star	July 1	
Brittney Sykes	All-Defensive First Team	September 22	
Li Meng	WNBA All-Rookie Team	October 2	
