= Christie Sides =

American basketball head coach (born 1977)

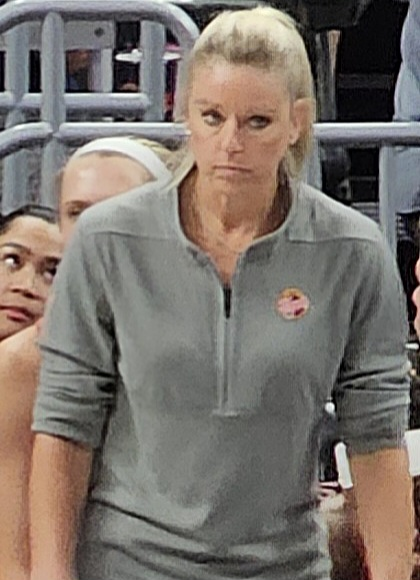
- Christie Sides coaching the Indiana Fever in 2024

Personal information
- Born: January 17, 1977 (age 49) Baton Rouge, Louisiana, U.S.

Career information
- High school: Central Private (Central, Louisiana)
- College: Ole Miss; Louisiana Tech
- Coaching career: 2000–2024

Career history
- 2000–2002: Ruston High School (assistant)
- 2002–2004: Louisiana Tech (assistant)
- 2004–2007: LSU (assistant)
- 2007–2013: Spartak Moscow (assistant)
- 2011–2016: Chicago Sky (assistant)
- 2016–2017: Northwestern (asst. HC)
- 2017–2019: Indiana Fever (assistant)
- 2019–2022: Louisiana–Monroe (asst. HC)
- 2022: Atlanta Dream (assistant)
- 2023–2024: Indiana Fever

Christie Sides (born January 17, 1977) is an American basketball head coach, most recently for the Indiana Fever of the WNBA. Sides has previously been an assistant coach for the Fever, Chicago Sky, and Atlanta Dream in the league. She has also been an assistant coach at the collegiate level.

== Early life and education ==
Sides grew up in Baton Rouge, Louisiana and attended Central Private High School. She played basketball and was named the Louisiana Gatorade Player of the Year for her senior year. She finished her high school career with 3,375 points. Following her high school career, she attended Ole Miss and Louisiana Tech. While at Louisiana Tech, Sides helped the Lady Techsters reach the 1999 Final Four.

== Coaching career ==
Sides began her coaching career at Ruston High School as an assistant coach for the varsity team. She also served as the head JV coach for 2 seasons. Following that, Sides returned to her alma mater and became an assistant at Louisiana Tech. She then moved on to join Pokey Chatman's staff at LSU. While at LSU, she was a part of three Final Fours.

Following her time at LSU, Sides followed Chatman into the professional ranks, first overseas with the Spartak Moscow Region team and then with the WNBA's Chicago Sky.

Sides went back to the NCAA level for the 2016–17 season and joined the Northwestern Wildcats staff. She was promoted to associate head coach on May 18, 2017, but resigned from her position to join back with Chatman and become an assistant with the Indiana Fever.

Following three years with the Fever, Sides returned to the NCAA, this time joining the Louisiana–Monroe staff.

She re-joined the WNBA ranks in 2022 on Tanisha Wright's staff with the Atlanta Dream.

=== Indiana Fever ===
Sides got her first head coaching job in 2022, when she was hired as the ninth head coach in Indiana Fever franchise history. In 2024, Sides helped guide Fever to reach their 1st playoffs since 2016. At the end of 2024 season, the Fever announced they were parting with Sides.

=== WNBA ===
Current as of game on September 4, 2024

Legend
Regular season	G	Games coached	W	Games won	L	Games lost	W–L %	Win–loss %
Playoffs	PG	Playoff games	PW	Playoff wins	PL	Playoff losses	PW–L %	Playoff win–loss %

Team	Year	G	W	L	W–L%	Finish	PG	PW	PL	PW–L%	Result
IND	2023	40	13	27	.325	10th in Eastern	—	—	—	—	Missed Playoffs
IND	2024	40	20	20	.500	3rd in Eastern	2	0	2	.000	Lost in First Round
Career		80	33	47	.413	—	2	0	2	.000	—
