= 2023 Phoenix Mercury season =

- Head coach: Vanessa Nygaard (until June 25th); Nikki Blue (after June 25th)
- Arena: Footprint Center

Results
- Record: 9–31 (.225)
- Place: 6th (Western)
- Playoff finish: Did not qualify

The 2023 Phoenix Mercury season was the 26th season for the Phoenix Mercury of the Women's National Basketball Association, and the second season under head coach Vanessa Nygaard.

In October 2022, Skylar Diggins-Smith announced on Instagram that she was pregnant with her second child.

On December 8, 2022, Brittney Griner was successfully returned to the United States of America after the Brittney Griner–Viktor Bout prisoner exchange went through without issues. By extension, Griner returned to action with the Mercury and the WNBA after missing the entire 2022 WNBA season due to her being arrested and imprisoned in Russia (a place she had previously played in for years during the WNBA's offseasons by playing with the UMMC Ekaterinburg without prior issue) for medical cannabis, which is considered an illegal substance there. The Mercury later re-signed Griner to a new deal on February 17, 2023.

On December 20, 2022, Mercury team owner Robert Sarver agreed to a deal made by a new ownership group led by United Wholesale Mortgage's CEO Mat Ishbia and his older brother Justin Ishbia where Sarver would sell his majority shares of both the Mercury and Phoenix Suns to them under a joint deal worth a record-high $4 billion. This transition into new ownership was made during the month of September 2022 after an independent investigation led by the National Basketball Association revealed some ugly, disgusting behaviors he had throughout his ownership periods with both the Suns and Mercury, though primarily with the Suns. The NBA approved of the sale to the Ishbia brothers on February 6, 2023, with Sarver's transition out of ownership of both franchises being made official on February 7, 2023. Despite his removal from ownership, Sarver still had to serve his suspension for the 2023 WNBA season until September 13, 2023; he had since disputed that suspension claim during that season because of his lack of team ownership.

The Mercury began the season with two losses, but won their third game to finish 1–2 in May. The team continued with its sluggish start losing their first three games in June. After a single win, the team went on a six-game losing streak and finishing the month with a 2–9 record Their only two wins in the month came against Indiana. In July the team fared slightly better, losing three straight games before winning three of four. However, the team lost its final three games of the month to finish 3–7. The Mercury showed improvement in August winning three of their first five games. However, that improvement did not last, as they lost seven straight games to end the month. During their seven-game losing streak, a 77–74 loss to the Dallas Wings eliminated the Mercury from playoff contention for the first time since 2012, and ended the longest active playoff streak in the WNBA at ten straight years. Their losing streak continued as the Mercury lost all four games in September to finish 9–31 and ended the season on an eleven-game losing streak. This was only the third season in Mercury history where they finished with single-digit wins, and their .225 winning percentage was the second lowest in franchise history. Their 31 losses were the most in a season in franchise history, though it was the first season the WNBA used a forty-game schedule. During this season, it was announced that long-time general manager Jim Pitman (who held his position with the Mercury since October 2013 following Jason Rowley's brief stint there) would resign from his position following the end of this season, being replaced by former Golden State Warriors special assistant and executive Nick U'Ren entering the next season.

== Transactions ==
=== WNBA draft ===
Round	Pick	Player	Nationality	School/Team/Country
3	27	Destiny Harden	United States	Miami
3	29	Kadi Sissoko	France	USC

=== Transactions ===
Date	Transaction
January 6, 2023	Hired Monica Wright-Rogers as Assistant General Manager
January 12, 2023	Extended Qualifying Offers to Sophie Cunningham, Megan Gustafson, Shey Peddy, and Sam Thomas
February 2, 2023	Signed Sam Thomas to a Qualifying Offer - Training Camp Contract
February 3, 2023	Signed Sophie Cunningham to a 2-Year Deal
February 3, 2023	Signed Megan Gustafson to a Training Camp Contract
February 6, 2023	Signed Sydney Wiese and Jennie Simms to Training Camp Contracts
February 11, 2023	Acquired Michaela Onyenwere, a 2024 Third-Round Pick (from Chicago), and a 2025 Second-Round Pick (from Chicago) in a 4-Team Trade involving the Chicago Sky, Dallas Wings, and the New York Liberty
February 13, 2023	Signed Moriah Jefferson
February 17, 2023	Signed Diana Taurasi to a 2-Year Deal
February 17, 2023	Signed Brittney Griner
February 17, 2023	Signed Shey Peddy to a Training Camp Contract
February 28, 2023	Signed Sug Sutton to a Training Camp Contract
March 2, 2023	Signed Destiny Slocum to a Training Camp Contract
March 3, 2023	Hired Tully Bevilaqua as Assistant Coach
March 27, 2023	Signed Kylee Shook to a Training Camp Contract
April 11, 2023	Signed Essence Booker to a Training Camp Contract
April 12, 2023	Signed Destiny Harden, Kadi Sissoko, and Liz Dixon to Training Camp Contracts
April 21, 2023	Hired Taja Edwards as Assistant Coach
April 27, 2023	Waived Sydney Wiese
May 5, 2023	Waived Destiny Harden
May 8, 2023	Waived Kylee Shook
May 10, 2023	Waived Essence Booker
May 13, 2023	Waived Liz Dixon and Destiny Slocum
May 15, 2023	Exercised 4th-Year Team Option on Michaela Onyenwere
May 16, 2023	Waived Jennie Simms and Sam Thomas
May 18, 2023	Placed Skylar Diggins-Smith on the Inactive List due to Pregnancy/Child-Birth
May 19, 2023	Signed Liz Dixon to a Hardship Contract
May 21, 2023	Released Liz Dixon from her Hardship Contract
June 21, 2023	Signed Sam Thomas to a Hardship Contract
June 22, 2023	Waived Evina Westbrook
June 22, 2023	Signed Jennie Simms to a Hardship Contract
June 24, 2023	Released Sam Thomas from the Hardship Contract
June 25, 2023	Fired Head Coach Vanessa Nygaard and named Nikki Blue as Interim Head Coach
June 27, 2023	Signed Alaina Coates to a Hardship Contract
June 29, 2023	Released Alaina Coates from the Hardship Contract
June 30, 2023	Hired Charli Turner Thorne as an Assistant Coach
July 10, 2023	Hired Nick U'Ren as General Manager
July 20, 2023	Waived Jennie Simms
July 20, 2023	Signed Liz Dixon to a 7-Day Contract
July 29, 2023	Signed Liz Dixon to a 2nd 7-Day Contract
August 7, 2023	Signed Destanni Henderson to a 7-Day Contract
August 14, 2023	Signed Destanni Henderson to a 2nd 7-Day Contract
August 17, 2023	Signed Liz Dixon to a 3rd 7-Day Contract
August 18, 2023	Signed Ashley Joens to a 7-Day Contract
August 20, 2023	Released Ashley Joens
August 21, 2023	Signed Ashley Joens to a 2nd 7-Day Contract
August 22, 2023	Signed Madi Williams to a 7-Day Contract
August 29, 2023	Signed Ashley Joens tot a 3rd 7-Day Contract
August 29, 2023	Signed Madi Williams to a 2nd 7-Day Contract
September 5, 2023	Signed Ashley Joens to a Hardship Contract
September 7, 2023	Signed Christyn Williams to a Hardship Contract

=== Roster Changes ===
==== Additions ====
Personnel	Signed/Trade	Former team
Michaela Onyenwere	Trade	New York Liberty
Moriah Jefferson	Free Agency	Minnesota Lynx
Kadi Sissoko	Draft Pick	2023 Draft Pick
Sug Sutton	Free Agency	-
Evina Westbrook	Waiver Claim	Washington Mystics
Ashley Joens	Free Agency	Dallas Wings
Madi Williams	Free Agency	Seattle Storm

==== Subtractions ====
Personnel	Reason	New team
Diamond DeShields	Trade	Dallas Wings
Kaela Davis	Free Agency	-
Reshanda Gray	Free Agency	-
Kia Nurse	Free Agency	Seattle Storm
Jennie Simms	Waived	-
Sam Thomas	Waived	-
Yvonne Turner	Free Agency	Seattle Storm

== Roster ==
2023 Phoenix Mercury roster
Players
Coaches

Pos.	No.	Nat.	Name	Height	Weight	DOB	From	Yrs
G	9	(United States)	Cunningham, Sophie	6' 1" (1.85m)	170 lb (77kg)	1996-08-16	Missouri	4
G	4	(United States)	Diggins-Smith, Skylar (Maternity Leave)	5' 9" (1.75m)	145 lb (66kg)	1990-08-02	Notre Dame	9
C	42	(United States)	Griner, Brittney (injured)	6' 9" (2.06m)	205 lb (93kg)	1990-10-18	Baylor	9
C	10	(United States)	Gustafson, Megan	6' 3" (1.91m)	195 lb (88kg)	1996-12-13	Iowa	4
G	8	(United States)	Jefferson, Moriah	5' 6" (1.68m)	123 lb (56kg)	1994-03-08	Connecticut	6
G	23	(United States)	Joens, Ashley	6' 0" (1.83m)	160 lb (73kg)	2000-03-16	Iowa State	R
F	12	(United States)	Onyenwere, Michaela	6' 0" (1.83m)	178 lb (81kg)	1999-08-10	UCLA	2
G	11	(United States)	Peddy, Shey (injured)	5' 7" (1.7m)	145 lb (66kg)	1988-10-28	Temple	4
F	30	(France)	Sissoko, Kadi	6' 2" (1.88m)	165 lb (75kg)	1999-01-25	USC	R
G	1	(United States)	Sutton, Sug	5' 8" (1.73m)	140 lb (64kg)	1998-12-17	Texas	1
G/F	3	(United States)	Taurasi, Diana (injured)	6' 0" (1.83m)	163 lb (74kg)	1982-06-11	Connecticut	18
F	21	(United States)	Turner, Brianna	6' 3" (1.91m)	170 lb (77kg)	1996-07-05	Notre Dame	4
G/F	25	(United States)	Williams, Madi	5' 11" (1.8m)	164 lb (74kg)	1999-10-29	Oklahoma	R

Head coach
(United States) Nikki Blue (UCLA)
Assistant coaches
(Australia) Tully Bevilaqua
(United States) Taja Edwards (Fresno State)
(United States) Charli Turner Thorne (Stanford)
Athletic trainer
(United States) Hanna Breck (Boston University)
Strength and conditioning coach
(United States) Derrick Nillisesen (Iowa Wesleyan)

Legend

- (C) Team captain
- (DP) Unsigned draft pick
- (FA) Free agent
- (S) Suspended
- Injured

=== Depth ===
Pos.	Starter	Bench
PG	Moriah Jefferson	Shey Peddy; Skylar Diggins-Smith(inactive)
SG	Diana Taurasi	Sug Sutton
SF	Sophie Cunningham	Ashley Joens; Madi Williams
PF	Brianna Turner	Michaela Onyenwere; Kadi Sissoko
C	Brittney Griner	Megan Gustafson

== Schedule ==
=== Preseason ===
2023 pre-season game log
Total: 1–1 (Home: 0–1; Road: 1–0)
May: 1–1 (Home: 0–1; Road: 1–0)

Game	Date	Team	Score	High points	High rebounds	High assists	Location Attendance	Record
1	May 8	@ Seattle	W 77–71	Sug Sutton (11)	Megan Gustafson (7)	Kadi Sissoko (4)	Climate Pledge Arena; 5,119	1–0
2	May 12	Los Angeles	L 71–91	Taurasi; Cunningham (13)	Megan Gustafson (6)	Diana Taurasi (5)	Footprint Center; N/A	1–1

2023 pre-season schedule

=== Regular season ===
2023 game log
Total: 9–31 (Home: 8–12; Road: 1–19)
May: 1–2 (Home: 1–1; Road: 0–1)

Game	Date	Team	Score	High points	High rebounds	High assists	Location Attendance	Record
1	May 19	@ Los Angeles	L 71–94	Brittney Griner (18)	Taurasi; Turner (7)	Diana Taurasi (5)	Crypto.com Arena; 10,396	0–1
2	May 21	Chicago	L 69–75	Brittney Griner (27)	Griner; Turner (10)	Diana Taurasi (6)	Footprint Center; 14,040	0–2
3	May 25	Minnesota	W 90–81	Diana Taurasi (23)	Brianna Turner (11)	Diana Taurasi (10)	Footprint Center; 6,057	1–2

June : 2–9 (Home: 1–4; Road: 1–5)

Game	Date	Team	Score	High points	High rebounds	High assists	Location Attendance	Record
4	June 2	Los Angeles	L 93–99 (OT)	Brittney Griner (24)	Brittney Griner (11)	Sug Sutton (6)	Footprint Center; 8,815	1–3
5	June 7	@ Dallas	L 79–84	Brittney Griner (24)	Diana Taurasi (6)	Diana Taurasi (7)	College Park Center; 4,242	1–4
6	June 9	@ Dallas	L 77–90	Brittney Griner (18)	Brianna Turner (8)	Sug Sutton (9)	College Park Center; 6,251	1–5
7	June 11	@ Indiana	W 85–82	Brittney Griner (29)	Michaela Onyenwere (12)	Sutton; Taurasi (7)	Gainbridge Fieldhouse; 5,013	2–5
8	June 13	Seattle	L 69–83	Sophie Cunningham (21)	Brianna Turner (10)	Shey Peddy (7)	Footprint Center; 7,044	2–6
9	June 16	@ Washington	L 69–88	Michaela Onyenwere (20)	Michaela Onyenwere (9)	Sug Sutton (8)	Entertainment and Sports Arena; N/A	2–7
10	June 18	@ New York	L 71–89	Sophie Cunningham (27)	Megan Gustafson (7)	Sug Sutton (9)	Barclays Center; 9,278	2–8
11	June 21	Las Vegas	L 79–99	Sug Sutton (21)	Megan Gustafson (10)	Sophie Cunningham (6)	Footprint Center; 11,580	2–9
12	June 24	@ Seattle	L 74–97	Moriah Jefferson (18)	Brittney Griner (6)	Sug Sutton (7)	Climate Pledge Arena; 9,122	2–10
13	June 27	Dallas	L 62–77	Brittney Griner (20)	Brianna Turner (7)	Jefferson; Sutton (4)	Footprint Center; 5,652	2–11
14	June 29	Indiana	W 85–63	Brittney Griner (22)	Michaela Onyenwere (7)	Diana Taurasi (6)	Footprint Center; 9,047	3–11

July : 3–7 (Home: 3–1; Road: 0–6)

Game	Date	Team	Score	High points	High rebounds	High assists	Location Attendance	Record
15	July 1	Minnesota	L 76–86	Brittney Griner (23)	Brianna Turner (13)	Moriah Jefferson (7)	Footprint Center; 8,777	3–12
16	July 5	@ New York	L 95–99	Diana Taurasi (23)	Brittney Griner (8)	Diana Taurasi (7)	Barclays Center; 7,151	3–13
17	July 7	@ Minnesota	L 64–75	Michaela Onyenwere (24)	Griner; Turner (8)	Sug Sutton (10)	Target Center; 7,714	3–14
18	July 9	Los Angeles	W 78–72	Brittney Griner (29)	Brittney Griner (11)	Moriah Jefferson (8)	Footprint Center; 9,206	4–14
19	July 11	@ Las Vegas	L 72–98	Michaela Onyenwere (18)	Brianna Turner (9)	Diana Taurasi (6)	Michelob Ultra Arena; 10,281	4–15
20	July 18	Connecticut	W 72–66	Sophie Cunningham (17)	Brianna Turner (8)	Brittney Griner (5)	Footprint Center; 7,788	5–15
21	July 20	Chicago	W 80–62	Shey Peddy (20)	Brittney Griner (11)	Sophie Cunningham (7)	Footprint Center; 11,292	6–15
22	July 23	@ Washington	L 69–84	Sophie Cunningham (17)	Cunningham; Turner (6)	Sug Sutton (6)	Entertainment and Sports Arena; 4,200	6–16
23	July 25	@ Atlanta	L 65–78	Megan Gustafson (19)	Megan Gustafson (8)	Jefferson; Sutton (3)	Gateway Center Arena; 3,209	6–17
24	July 30	@ Chicago	L 85–104	Diana Taurasi (24)	Megan Gustafson (8)	Moriah Jefferson (7)	Wintrust Arena; 8,914	6–18

August : 3–9 (Home: 3–4; Road: 0–5)

Game	Date	Team	Score	High points	High rebounds	High assists	Location Attendance	Record
25	August 1	@ Indiana	L 71–72	Diana Taurasi (29)	Brianna Turner (8)	Moriah Jefferson (4)	Gainbridge Fieldhouse; 3,018	6–19
26	August 3	Atlanta	W 91–71	Diana Taurasi (42)	Gustafson; Turner (8)	Moriah Jefferson (4)	Footprint Center; 7,564	7–19
27	August 5	Seattle	L 91–97	Diana Taurasi (28)	Brittney Griner (6)	Sug Sutton (8)	Footprint Center; 9,411	7–20
28	August 8	Washington	W 91–72	Jefferson; Taurasi (15)	Brianna Turner (8)	Cunningham; Jefferson; Sutton; Taurasi (4)	Footprint Center; 6,610	8–20
29	August 10	Connecticut	W 90–84	Brittney Griner (21)	Brittney Griner (10)	Jefferson; Taurasi (5)	Footprint Center; 7,186	9–20
30	August 13	@ Seattle	L 71–81	Sophie Cunningham (25)	Brittney Griner (10)	Diana Taurasi (7)	Climate Pledge Arena; 10,107	9–21
31	August 18	New York	L 63–85	Cunningham; Taurasi (14)	Brianna Turner (8)	Moriah Jefferson (7)	Footprint Center; 9,652	9–22
32	August 20	Indiana	L 73–83	Sophie Cunningham (18)	Brianna Turner (9)	Jefferson; Taurasi (3)	Footprint Center; 11,807	9–23
33	August 22	@ Los Angeles	L 62–91	Sophie Cunningham (16)	Megan Gustafson (8)	Sophie Cunningham (6)	Crypto.com Arena; 3,469	9–24
34	August 27	Dallas	L 74–77	Moriah Jefferson (20)	Brianna Turner (10)	Moriah Jefferson (5)	Footprint Center; 12,163	9–25
35	August 29	@ Atlanta	L 76–94	Sug Sutton (20)	Brittney Griner (6)	Moriah Jefferson (9)	Gateway Center Arena; 2,785	9–26
36	August 31	@ Connecticut	L 74–84	Brittney Griner (15)	Turner; Sutton (6)	Sug Sutton (6)	Mohegan Sun Arena; 7,794	9–27

September : 0–4 (Home: 0–2; Road: 0–2)

Game	Date	Team	Score	High points	High rebounds	High assists	Location Attendance	Record
37	September 3	@ Minnesota	L 73–86	Moriah Jefferson (32)	Brittney Griner (10)	Sug Sutton (5)	Target Center; 7,314	9–28
38	September 5	Washington	L 77–100	Michaela Onyenwere (19)	Gustafson; Turner (7)	Sug Sutton (7)	Footprint Center; 7,038	9–29
39	September 8	Las Vegas	L 73–94	Sug Sutton (18)	Sug Sutton (11)	Sug Sutton (11)	Footprint Center; 13,206	9–30
40	September 10	@ Las Vegas	L 85–100	Moriah Jefferson (22)	Gustafson; Turner (7)	Jefferson; Sutton (6)	T-Mobile Arena; 17,406	9–31

2023 season schedule

== Standings ==
#	Team	W	L	PCT	GB	Conf.	Home	Road	Cup
1	x – Las Vegas Aces	34	6	.850	–	18–2	19–1	15–5	9–1
2	x – New York Liberty	32	8	.800	2	16–4	15–5	17–3	7–3
3	x – Connecticut Sun	27	13	.675	7	14–6	13–7	14–6	7–3
4	x – Dallas Wings	22	18	.550	12	11–9	11–9	11–9	6–4
5	x – Atlanta Dream	19	21	.475	15	11–9	11–9	8–12	6–4
6	x – Minnesota Lynx	19	21	.475	15	12–8	9–11	10–10	5–5
7	x – Washington Mystics	19	21	.475	15	9–11	12–8	7–13	5–5
8	x – Chicago Sky	18	22	.450	16	5–15	7–13	11–9	3–7
9	e – Los Angeles Sparks	17	23	.425	17	9–11	10–10	7–13	5–5
10	e – Indiana Fever	13	27	.325	21	5–15	6–14	7–13	2–8
11	e – Seattle Storm	11	29	.275	23	8–12	4–16	7–13	4–6
12	e – Phoenix Mercury	9	31	.225	25	2–18	8–12	1–19	1–9

Notes

(#) – League Standing
x – Clinched playoff berth
e – Eliminated from postseason contention
Source: Overall standings and Commissioner's Cup Standings

== Statistics ==
Legend
GP	Games played	GS	Games started	MPG	Minutes per game	RPG	Rebounds per game
APG	Assists per game	SPG	Steals per game	BPG	Blocks per game	PPG	Points per game
FG%	Field-goal percentage	3P%	3-point field-goal percentage	FT%	Free-throw percentage	TO	Turnovers per game
PF	Fouls per game		Team leader		League leader

=== Regular season ===
Player	GP	GS	MPG	FG%	3P%	FT%	RPG	APG	SPG	BPG	PPG
Brittney Griner	31	31	27.6	.562	.111	.772	6.3	2.2	0.5	1.6	17.5
Diana Taurasi	26	26	27.3	.403	.342	.848	3.6	4.6	0.5	0.5	16.0
Sophie Cunningham	31	31	29.0	.413	.337	.875	2.8	2.1	0.6	0.4	11.3
Moriah Jefferson	39	36	24.9	.434	.355	.820	2.0	3.6	1.1	0.2	10.5
Michaela Onyenwere	40	27	23.8	.404	.315	.759	3.7	1.3	0.8	0.5	8.9
Sug Sutton	40	12	26.3	.384	.333	.807	2.6	4.8	0.7	0.1	8.2
Megan Gustafson	34	4	15.1	.526	.349	.806	3.9	4.8	0.7	0.1	8.2
Shey Peddy	18	0	15.8	.369	.348	.800	1.8	1.8	0.9	0.0	5.2
Ashley Joens^{≠}	8	0	13.4	.387	.500	1.000	1.1	0.1	0.3	0.0	4.5
Brianna Turner	40	33	26.3	.650	.000	.500	6.3	1.3	1.0	1.1	3.5
Liz Dixon^{‡}	10	0	5.6	.571	.000	.875	1.3	0.1	0.0	0.2	2.3
Jennie Simms^{‡}	6	0	11.7	.286	.000	.714	2.2	0.5	0.3	0.0	2.2
Madi Williams^{≠}	5	0	9.2	.333	.000	.000	1.0	0.2	0.4	0.2	2.0
Kadi Sissoko	40	0	8.4	.371	.167	.625	1.6	0.2	0.1	0.1	1.5
Destanni Henderson^{‡}	5	0	6.2	.200	.200	1.000	0.8	0.4	0.0	0.0	1.4
Evina Westbrook^{‡}	9	0	8.0	.100	.000	1.000	1.0	0.4	0.1	0.1	1.1
Alaina Coates^{‡}	2	0	2.5	1.000	.000	.000	0.0	0.0	0.5	0.0	1.0
Sam Thomas^{‡}	1	0	11.0	.000	.000	.000	1.0	0.0	0.0	0.0	0.0

^{‡}Waived/Released during the season
^{†}Traded during the season
^{≠}Acquired during the season

== Awards and honors ==
Recipient	Award/Milestone	Date awarded	Ref.
Brittney Griner	WNBA All-Star Starter	June 25	
Diana Taurasi	Western Conference Player of the Week	August 8	
