= Maïa Hirsch =

French basketball player (born 2003)

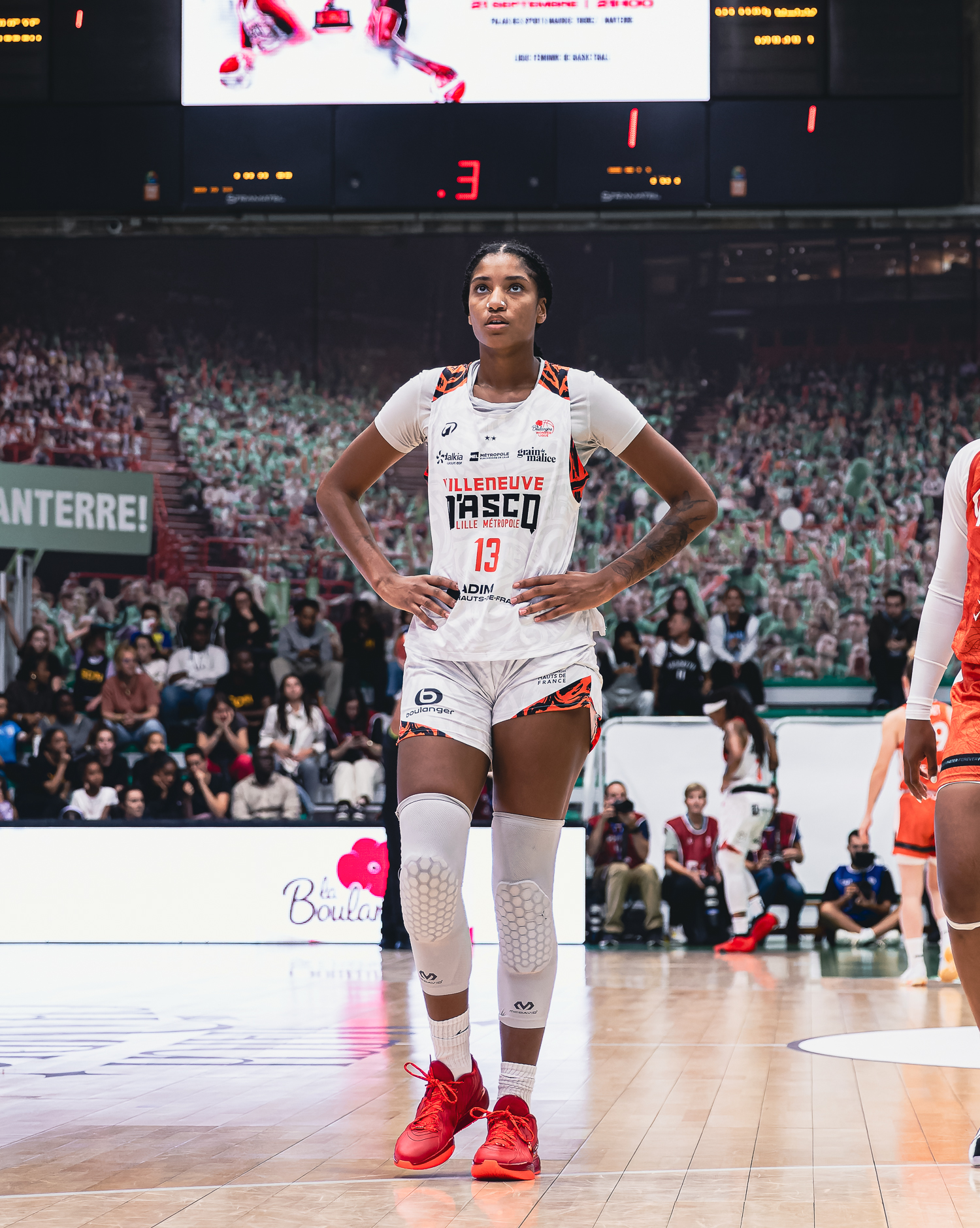
- Hirsch with ESB Villeneuve-d'Ascq in 2024

No. 33 – Flammes Carolo Basket
- Position: Power forward / Center
- League: La Boulangère Wonderligue

Personal information
- Born: November 13, 2003 (age 23) Saint-Quentin, Aisne, France
- Listed height: 6 ft 5 in (1.96 m)

Career information
- WNBA draft: 2023: 1st round, 12th overall pick
- Drafted by: Minnesota Lynx
- Playing career: 2021–present

Career history
- 2021–2022: Charnay Basket Bourgogne Sud
- 2022–2025: ESB Villeneuve-d'Ascq
- 2025–present: Flammes Carolo Basket
- Stats at Basketball Reference

Maïa Hirsch (born November 13, 2003) is a French basketball player for Flammes Carolo Basket of the La Boulangère Wonderligue. She was drafted 12th overall by the Minnesota Lynx in the 2023 WNBA draft.

== Early life ==
Hirsch trained at Roannais Basket Féminin and joined the Federal Basket-Ball Center in 2018. She stayed there for a year before returning to play at the Roanne club which plays in NF1 and of which her father, Olivier Hirsch, is the coach. She remained with Roanne for two years.

== Professional career ==
=== France ===
Hirsch began her professional career in the 2021–22 season with Charnay in the LFB. She had a relatively successful individual season, averaging 7.4 points and 2.4 rebounds in 20 minutes, though her team finished last in the regular season and in the play-downs and was relegated to the LF2.

In June 2022, Hirsch signed with Villeneuve-d'Ascq. Hirsch and Villeneuve lost in the qualifying round of the 2022–23 EuroLeague Women and participated in the 2022–23 EuroCup Women, where they made it to the semifinals.

In the 2023–24 season, Villeneuve won the French title and went all the way to the finals of the 2023–24 EuroLeague Women. However, Hirsch missed most of the season with a foot injury. In June 2024, she extended her contract with the team until 2027.

In the 2024–25 season, Hirsch once again struggled with injuries, appearing in only 8 regular season games for Villeneuve.

In May 2025, Hirsch signed with Flammes Carolo Basket.

=== WNBA ===
Hirsch was drafted by the Minnesota Lynx with the 12th pick in the first round of the 2023 WNBA draft. However, as of 2025, she has not yet joined the team.
