= Kadi Sissoko =

French basketball player (born 1999)

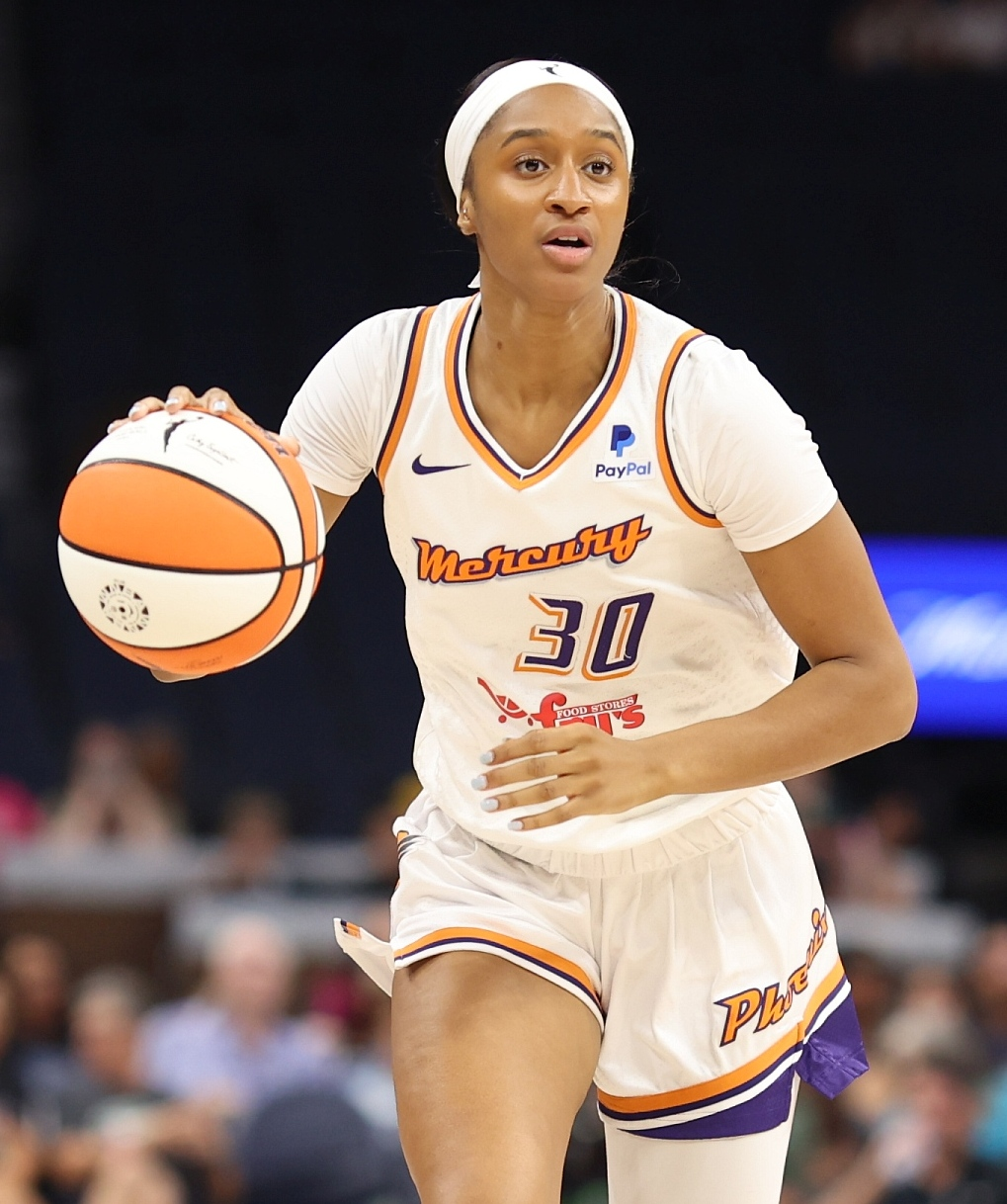
- Sissoko with the Phoenix Mercury in 2023

No. 30 – ESB Villeneuve-d'Ascq
- Position: Forward
- League: Turkish Super League

Personal information
- Born: January 25, 1999 (age 27) Aubervilliers, France
- Listed height: 6 ft 2 in (1.88 m)
- Listed weight: 165 lb (75 kg)

Career information
- High school: Lycee Marcelin Berthelot
- College: Syracuse (2018–2019); Minnesota (2019–2022); USC (2022–2023)
- WNBA draft: 2023: 3rd round, 29th overall pick
- Drafted by: Phoenix Mercury
- Playing career: 2017–present

Career history
- 2017–2018: Basket Landes
- 2023: Phoenix Mercury
- 2023–2024: Flammes Carolo
- 2024: OGM Ormanspor
- 2025–present: ESB Villeneuve-d'Ascq

Career highlights
- All-Pac-12 Team (2023)
- Stats at Basketball Reference

Kadiatou "Kadi" Sissoko (born January 25, 1999) is a French professional basketball player for Villeneuve d'Ascq of the La Boulangère Wonderligue. She was selected in the third round of the 2023 WNBA draft by the Phoenix Mercury. She played college basketball at Syracuse, Minnesota, and USC.

== College career ==
Sissoko committed to play for Syracuse in 2018. She played with her Orange teammates — Marie-Paule Foppossi and Maeva Djaldi-Tabdi — while over in France during high school and when she was on the French National Teams. Sissoko struggled with a knee injury during her freshman season with the Orange, causing her to have a meniscus surgery. She averaged 2.9 points and 2.1 rebounds per game during the year and following the season announced that she would be transferring.

Sissoko transferred to Minnesota following her freshman season and had to sit out due to the NCAA transfer rules. When she signed with the Gophers and played, Sissoko became the highest ranked recruit to play for Minnesota since Rachel Banham. Sissoko spent two season with the Gophers and became a staple in the starting lineup averaging double digit points and was the team's leading rebounder. Following her redshirt junior season, Sissoke announced she was entering the transfer portal again.

Sissoko found her next home with the USC Trojans. During her one season at USC, Sissoko was the Trojans' leading scorer with 15.6 points per game, 1.3 steals per game as well as being the team's second leading rebounder with 6.4 rebounds per game. She was named to the All-Pac-12 Team and the Media All-Pac-12 Team.

== College statistics ==
Year	Team	GP	Points	FG%	3P%	FT%	RPG	APG	SPG	BPG	PPG
2018–19	Syracuse	22	70	.392	.158	.600	1.8	0.5	0.3	0.0	3.2
2020–21	Minnesota	20	251	.416	.323	.672	6.6	1.7	0.7	0.6	12.6
2021–22	Minnesota	27	356	.415	.214	.722	5.7	1.4	0.7	0.3	5.7
2022–23	USC	26	401	.455	.290	.720	6.2	1.9	1.2	0.6	15.4
Career		101	1078	.427	.257	.705	5.1	1.4	0.8	0.4	10.7

== Professional career ==
=== Europe ===
Sissoko started the 2024–2025 season with OGM Ormanspor of the Turkish Super League, but signed with Villeneuve d'Ascq of the La Boulangère Wonderligue for the 2025 part of the season.

=== WNBA ===
==== Phoenix Mercury ====
Sissoko was selected 29th Overall in the Third Round of the 2023 WNBA draft by the Phoenix Mercury. Sissoko made the Opening Night roster for the Mercury and made her WNBA debut against the Los Angeles Sparks on May 19, 2023, scoring 2 points and grabbing 2 rebounds. She was waived by the Mercury prior to the 2024 season.

=== WNBA career statistics ===
Legend
GP	Games played	GS	Games started	MPG	Minutes per game	RPG	Rebounds per game
APG	Assists per game	SPG	Steals per game	BPG	Blocks per game	PPG	Points per game
TO	Turnovers per game	FG%	Field-goal percentage	3P%	3-point field-goal percentage	FT%	Free-throw percentage
**Bold**	Career best	°	League leader

==== Regular season ====
Year	Team	GP	GS	MPG	FG%	3P%	FT%	RPG	APG	SPG	BPG	TO	PPG
2023	Phoenix	40	0	8.4	.371	.167	.625	1.6	0.2	0.1	0.1	0.7	1.5
Career	1 year, 1 team	40	0	8.4	.371	.167	.625	1.6	0.2	0.1	0.1	0.7	1.5
