= Madi Williams =

American basketball player (born 1999)

No. 25 – Crvena zvezda
- Position: Guard/Forward
- League: Basketball League of Serbia; EuroCup Women

Personal information
- Born: October 29, 1999 (age 27) Fort Worth, Texas, U.S.
- Listed height: 5 ft 11 in (1.80 m)

Career information
- High school: Trinity Valley School (Fort Worth, Texas)
- College: Oklahoma (2018–2023)
- WNBA draft: 2023: 2nd round, 18th overall pick
- Drafted by: Seattle Storm
- Playing career: 2023–present

Career history
- 2023: Phoenix Mercury
- 2023: Bursa Uludağ
- 2024: PEAC-Pécs
- 2024—present: Crvena zvezda

Career highlights
- AP All-American Honorable Mention (2023); 2x WBCA All-American Honorable Mention (2022, 2023); 3x First-team All-Big 12 (2021–2023); McDonald's All-American (2018)
- Stats at Basketball Reference

Madison Williams (born October 29, 1999) is an American professional basketball player for Crvena zvezda in the Basketball League of Serbia. She was drafted in the Second Round of the 2023 WNBA draft by the Seattle Storm. She played college basketball at Oklahoma.

== College career ==
Williams came out of high school as the 24th overall ranked player according to ESPN HoopGurlz's rankings. She was named to the McDonald's All-American Game in 2018. Williams signed to play for the Sooners in November 2017.

During her time at Oklahoma, Williams was named to the WBCA All-American Honorable Mention team twice, AP All-American Honorable Mention team, was a 3-time All-Big 12 Team honoree, and joined the Top 10 ranks in multiple Sooner statistical categories. Williams also was a two-finals Cheryl Miller Award finalist. Williams finished her Sooner career as the only player in school history with 2,000 points, 950 rebounds and 300 assists.

== College statistics ==
Year	Team	GP	Points	FG%	3P%	FT%	RPG	APG	SPG	BPG	PPG
2018–19	Oklahoma	30	349	.416	.100	.603	8.0	1.8	1.3	0.5	11.6
2019–20	Oklahoma	30	484	.471	.353	.701	7.3	1.9	1.4	0.3	16.1
2020–21	Oklahoma	21	420	.493	.286	.688	5.1	3.1	2.0	0.6	20.0
2021–22	Oklahoma	33	594	.469	.311	.722	7.6	2.6	1.4	0.2	18.0
2022–23	Oklahoma	33	518	.514	.329	.765	5.4	2.8	1.4	0.7	15.7
Career		147	2365	.474	.306	.697	6.8	2.4	1.5	0.5	16.1

== WNBA career ==
Williams was drafted in the Second Round of the 2023 WNBA draft - 18th overall - by the Seattle Storm. Williams competed in training camp for the Storm, but ultimately didn't make the roster. She was waived on May 12, 2023.

=== Phoenix Mercury ===
Williams signed a 7-Day Contract with the Phoenix Mercury on August 22, 2023, due to Brittney Griner and Diana Taurasi being out for Phoenix. Wiliams made her WNBA debut against the Los Angeles Sparks on August 23, tallying 2 points, 2 rebounds, and 1 block.

=== WNBA career statistics ===
Legend
GP	Games played	GS	Games started	MPG	Minutes per game	RPG	Rebounds per game
APG	Assists per game	SPG	Steals per game	BPG	Blocks per game	PPG	Points per game
TO	Turnovers per game	FG%	Field-goal percentage	3P%	3-point field-goal percentage	FT%	Free-throw percentage
**Bold**	Career best	°	League leader

==== Regular season ====
Year	Team	GP	GS	MPG	FG%	3P%	FT%	RPG	APG	SPG	BPG	TO	PPG
2023	Phoenix	5	0	9.2	.333	.000	—	1.0	0.2	0.4	0.2	1.2	2.0
Career	1 year, 1 team	5	0	9.2	.333	.000	—	1.0	0.2	0.4	0.2	1.2	2.0
