= Sug Sutton =

American basketball player (born 1998)

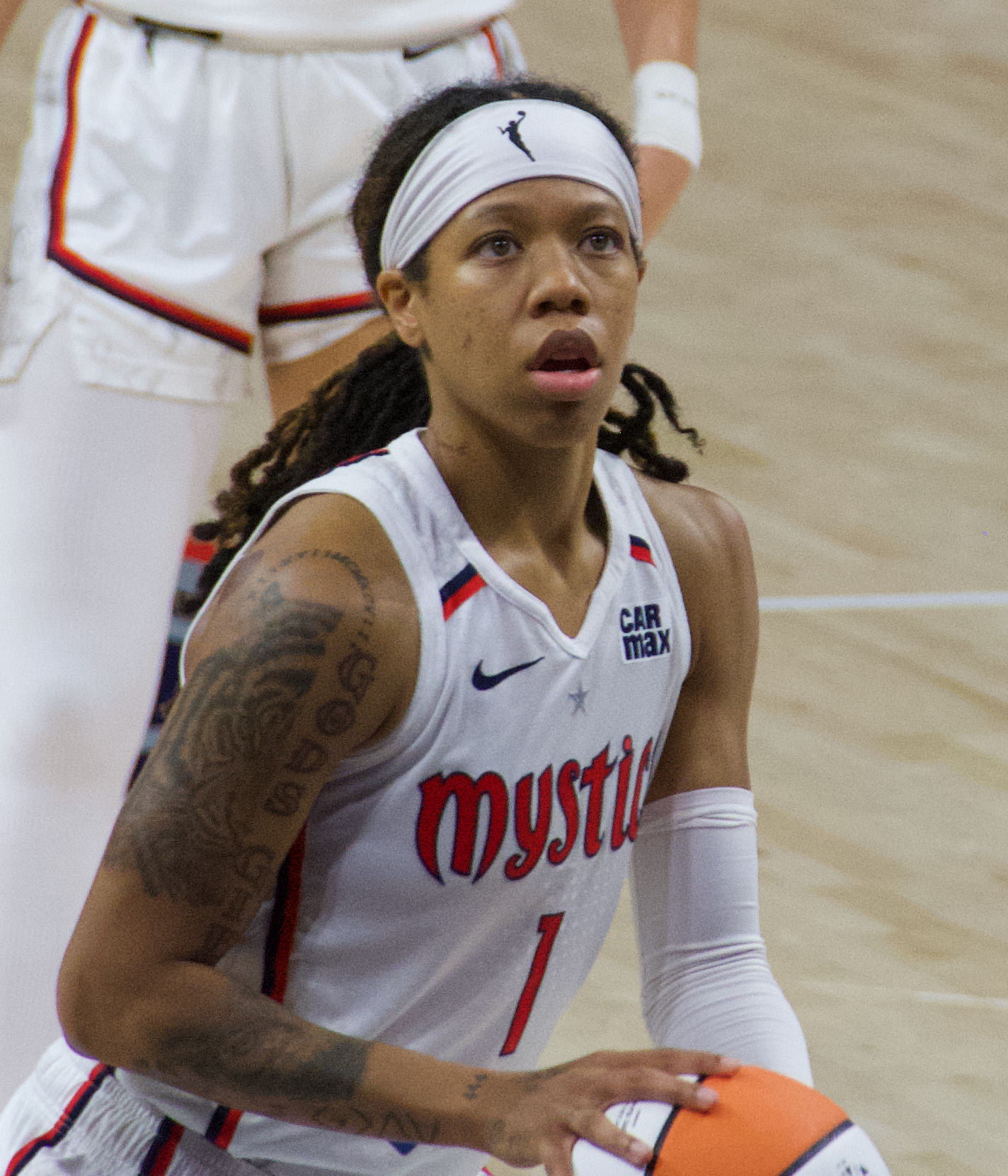
- Sutton with the Washington Mystics in 2025

Dallas Wings
- Position: Point guard / shooting guard
- League: WNBA

Personal information
- Born: December 17, 1998 (age 27) St. Louis, Missouri, U.S.
- Listed height: 5 ft 8 in (1.73 m)
- Listed weight: 140 lb (64 kg)

Career information
- High school: Parkway North (Saint Louis, Missouri)
- College: Texas (2016–2020)
- WNBA draft: 2020: 3rd round, 36th overall pick
- Drafted by: Washington Mystics
- Playing career: 2020–present

Career history
- 2020: Washington Mystics
- 2020–2021: Ślęza Wrocław
- 2021–2022: Townsville Fire
- 2022–2023: AZS Poznań
- 2023–2024: Phoenix Mercury
- 2023–2024: OGM Ormanspor
- 2024–2025: Washington Mystics
- 2025: Elitzur Ramla
- 2026–present: Rose BC
- 2026: Portland Fire
- 2026–present: Dallas Wings

Career highlights
- First-team All-Big 12 (2019); Second-team All-Big 12 (2020); McDonald's All-American (2016)
- Stats at WNBA.com
- Stats at Basketball Reference
Medals
Women's basketball
Representing United States
FIBA Under-19 World Cup
Silver medal – second place	2017 Italy	Team

Alecia Kaorie "Sug" Sutton (born December 17, 1998) is an American basketball player for the Dallas Wings of the Women's National Basketball Association (WNBA) and for the Rose of Unrivaled. Born in Saint Louis, Missouri, Sutton went to Parkway North High School and played collegiately for the University of Texas. She was drafted by the Mystics with the 36th overall pick of the 2020 WNBA draft.

== Professional career ==
=== WNBA ===
==== Washington Mystics (2020) ====
Sutton was drafted by the Washington Mystics with the 36th overall pick of the 2020 WNBA draft. On May 25, prior to the season's start, Sutton was released by the Mystics. On August 16, midway through the season, Sutton was again signed by the Mystics. On August 19, Sutton made her WNBA debut in a win against the Atlanta Dream and scored her first WNBA career points. On May 13, 2021, she was waived by the Mystics.

==== Phoenix Mercury (2023–2024) ====
Sutton signed a training camp contract with the Phoenix Mercury prior to the start of the 2023 season. Sutton went through camp and ultimately made the opening night roster for the Mercury. On September 8, 2023, Sutton recorded the first triple-double in Phoenix Mercury history in a loss against the Las Vegas Aces, with 18 points, 11 rebounds, and 11 assists.

On February 27, 2024, Sutton signed a training camp contract with the Mercury. Sutton made the final roster and played for Phoenix in 22 games.

==== Second stint with the Washington Mystics (2024–2025) ====
On August 20, 2024, Sutton and Phoenix's 2025 third-round pick was traded to the Washington Mystics for the rights to Swedish guard Klara Lundquist.

==== Portland Fire (2026) ====
On April 3, 2026, she was drafted 20th overall by the Portland Fire in the 2026 WNBA expansion draft.

On May 21, 2026, Sutton was waived by the Portland Fire.

==== Dallas Wings (2026–present) ====
On June 14, 2026, Sutton signed a rest-of-season contract with the Dallas Wings.

=== Unrivaled ===
On November 5, 2025, it was announced that Sutton had been drafted by Rose BC for the 2026 Unrivaled season.

== Career statistics ==
Legend
GP	Games played	GS	Games started	MPG	Minutes per game	RPG	Rebounds per game
APG	Assists per game	SPG	Steals per game	BPG	Blocks per game	PPG	Points per game
TO	Turnovers per game	FG%	Field-goal percentage	3P%	3-point field-goal percentage	FT%	Free-throw percentage
**Bold**	Career best	°	League leader

=== WNBA ===
==== Regular season ====
Stats current through end of 2025 season

WNBA regular season statistics
Year	Team	GP	GS	MPG	FG%	3P%	FT%	RPG	APG	SPG	BPG	TO	PPG
2020	Washington	12	0	9.4	.364	.294	.714	0.7	1.0	0.1	0.0	**0.5**	2.9
2023	Phoenix	40	12	**26.3**	.384	.333	**.807**	**2.6**	**4.8**	0.7	**0.1**	2.5	**8.2**
2024	Phoenix	22	0	14.9	.306	.270	.692	1.1	2.4	0.6	0.0	1.3	2.9
2024	Washington	7	0	7.3	.286	.000	.000	0.6	1.4	0.3	0.0	0.7	0.6
2025	Washington	**43**	**43**	26.1	**.422**	**.353**	.771	1.8	3.9	**0.8**	**0.1**	1.9	7.4
**Career**	4 years, 2 teams	124	55	21.5	.390	.328	.776	1.7	3.5	0.6	0.1	1.8	6.0

==== Playoffs ====
WNBA playoff statistics
Year	Team	GP	GS	MPG	FG%	3P%	FT%	RPG	APG	SPG	BPG	TO	PPG
2020	Washington	1	0	4.0	.500	—	—	1.0	0.0	0.0	0.0	0.0	2.0
**Career**	1 year, 1 team	1	0	4.0	.500	—	—	1.0	0.0	0.0	0.0	0.0	2.0

=== College ===
Ratios
Year	Team	GP	FG%	3P%	FT%	RBG	APG	BPG	SPG	PPG
2016-17	Texas	**34**	34.7%	22.2%	64.3%	1.71	1.27	0.09	0.38	3.82
2017-18	Texas	**34**	44.2%	**35.1%**	61.1%	2.88	2.21	0.12	0.82	6.79
2018-19	Texas	33	**47.5%**	28.6%	**76.3%**	**5.39**	**5.39**	0.06	1.27	**12.70**
2019-20	Texas	29	38.1%	29.0%	69.1%	3.83	4.31	**0.17**	**1.83**	10.72
Career		130	42.1%	29.5%	70.1%	3.42	3.24	0.11	1.05	8.39

Totals
Year	Team	GP	FG	FGA	3P	3PA	FT	FTA	REB	A	BK	ST	PTS
2016-17	Texas	**34**	51	147	10	45	18	28	58	43	3	13	130
2017-18	Texas	**34**	91	206	**27**	**77**	22	36	98	75	4	28	231
2018-19	Texas	33	**164**	**345**	20	70	**71**	93	**178**	**178**	2	42	**419**
2019-20	Texas	29	114	299	18	62	65	**94**	111	125	**5**	**53**	311
Career		130	420	997	75	254	176	251	445	421	14	136	1091

== Personal life ==
Sutton goes by "Sug," short for "Sugar." The nickname was given to her by her father and grandfather. Sutton's parents are Larry Sutton and Tonette Moore. At University of Texas, Sutton majored in health promotion and behavioral sciences.
