= Moriah Jefferson =

American basketball player (born 1994)

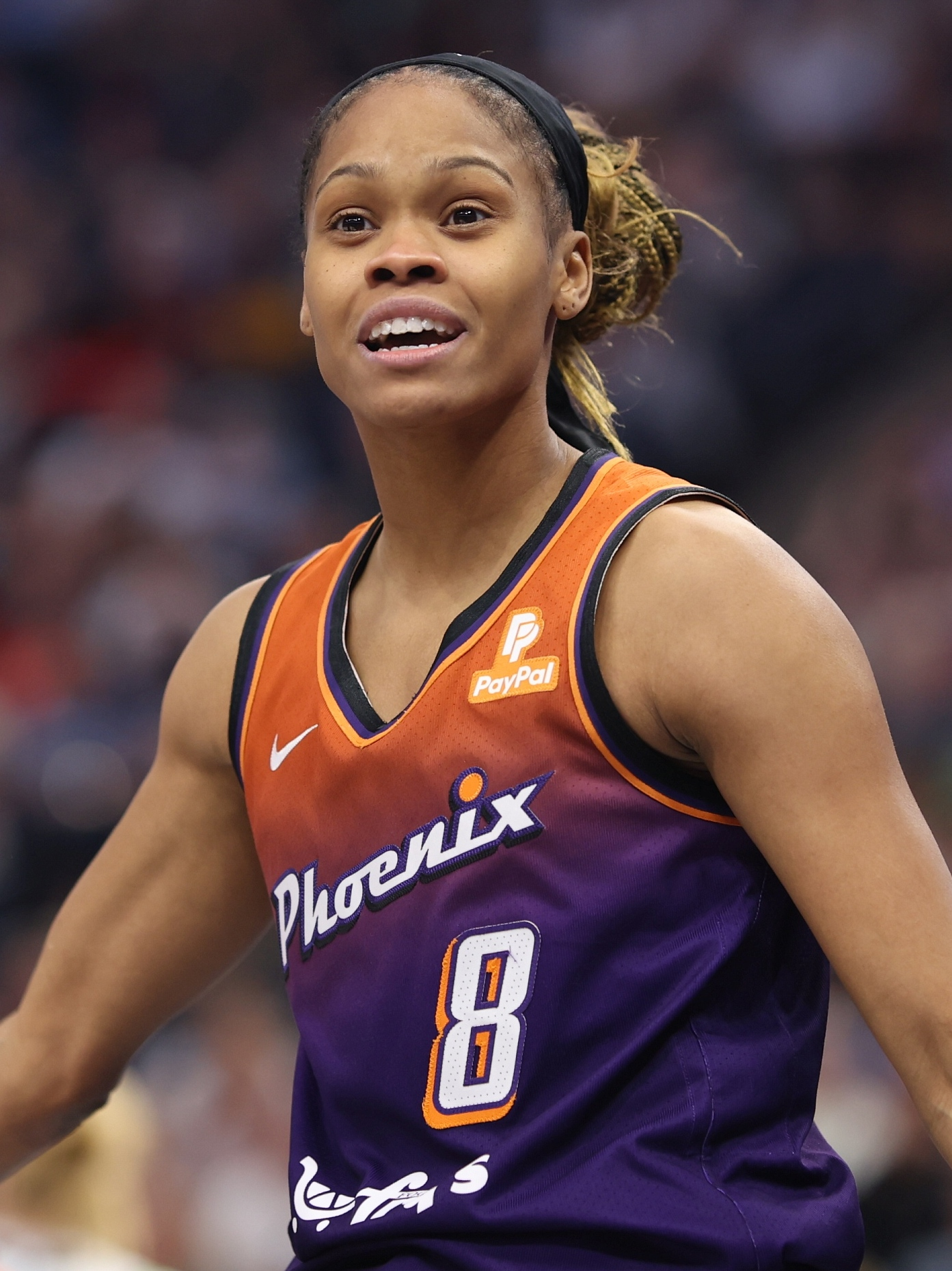
- Jefferson with the Phoenix Mercury in 2023

Free agent
- Position: Point guard

Personal information
- Born: March 8, 1994 (age 32) Dallas, Texas, U.S.
- Listed height: 5 ft 6 in (1.68 m)
- Listed weight: 130 lb (59 kg)

Career information
- High school: Texas Home Educators' Sports Association
- College: UConn (2012–2016)
- WNBA draft: 2016: 1st round, 2nd overall pick
- Drafted by: San Antonio Stars
- Playing career: 2016–present

Career history
- 2016–2018: San Antonio Stars / Las Vegas Aces
- 2016–2017, 2018–2019: Galatasaray
- 2019–2022: Dallas Wings
- 2022: Minnesota Lynx
- 2022–2023: CB Avenida
- 2023: Phoenix Mercury
- 2024: Connecticut Sun
- 2024–2025: Chicago Sky

Career highlights
- WNBA All-Rookie Team (2016); 4× NCAA champion (2013–2016); WBCA Defensive Player of the Year (2016); Dawn Staley Award (2016); 2× Nancy Lieberman Award winner (2015, 2016); 2× All-American – WBCA, USBWA (2015, 2016); First-team All-American – AP (2016); Second-team All-American – AP (2015); AAC Defensive Player of the Year (2016); AAC Most Improved Player (2015); 3× First-team All-AAC (2014–2016); Big East All-Freshman Team (2013); McDonald's All-American (2012)
- Stats at WNBA.com
- Stats at Basketball Reference
Medals
Women's Basketball
Representing United States
Pan American Games
Silver medal – second place	2015 Toronto	Team
FIBA Under-19 World Cup
Gold medal – first place	2013 Lithuania	Team
FIBA Under-18 Americas Championship
Gold medal – first place	2012 Puerto Rico	Team

Moriah Jefferson (born March 8, 1994) is an American professional basketball player who is currently a free agent. She was drafted second overall by the San Antonio Stars in the 2016 WNBA draft. Jefferson played point guard for UConn women's basketball team, where she won four consecutive national championships. She finished her UConn career ranked first in assists, second in steals, and as a two-time winner of the Nancy Lieberman Award as the top point guard in the nation.

== Early life ==
Jefferson is the daughter of Robin and Lorenza Jefferson. She has two brothers, Joshua and Jeremiah, and one sister, Danielle Noble.

Jefferson played five varsity seasons with the Texas Home Educators Sports Association (THESA) Riders as a homeschooled athlete. Jefferson began playing with THESA's varsity squad as an eighth grader and compiled 509 points, 85 rebounds, and 87 assists. In her freshman year, she started in 50 of 51 games played and averaged 19.5 points, 1.7 rebounds, 1.7 assists. and 2.8 steals per game to help THESA to a 42–10 record. As a sophomore, Jefferson averaged 17.5 points to help her team to a 42–9 record. During her junior year, she started all 50 games and averaged 21.8 points, 5.0 rebounds, 4.0 assists, and 4.0 steals per game in aiding her team to a 42–8 record. As a senior, she averaged 17.3 points, 3.8 rebounds, 3.6 assists, and 5.1 steals per game to lead her team to a 41–6 record. Jefferson helped lead the Riders to five National Christian Homeschool Basketball Championships (NCHBC) titles and five NCHBC Texas Region titles and finished her career with 3,354 points, 825 rebounds, and 728 steals.

Jefferson was selected to the 2012 WBCA High School Coaches' All-America Team. She participated in the 2012 WBCA High School All-America Game, scoring four points.

Jefferson was recruited by many schools; she visited Baylor, Connecticut, Oklahoma, Texas and Texas A&M, and was also considering Kentucky and Tennessee before cutting her list down to Baylor, Connecticut and Texas A&M. She ended up choosing Connecticut. She is the first recruit from the state of Texas to play for UConn.

== USA Basketball ==
Jefferson was named to the USA Basketball U18 team, coached by Katie Meier, the head coach of the University of Miami. Among Jefferson's teammates were Connecticut-bound players Breanna Stewart and Morgan Tuck. The team played in the Ninth Women's FIBA Americas U18 Championship For Women, held in Gurabo, Puerto Rico during August 2012. The USA team won all five games to win the championship and the gold medal. After winning the first four easily, with winning margins of 40 points or more, USA fell behind by double digits in the gold medal game against Brazil. The team came back from the deficit, and went on to win the game 71–47. Jefferson averaged 5.6 points per game, and, although the shortest player on the team at 5 ft 6 in (1.68 m), she tied for third in blocks with five over the course of the event.

Jefferson continued with the team as it became the U19 team, and competed on behalf of the US at the FIBA U19 World Championship, held in Klaipėda and Panevėžys, Lithuania, in July 2013. The team won all nine games, with an average winning margin of 43 points per game. Jefferson scored 4.0 points per game, and was third on her team with 31 assists over the course of the event.

Jefferson was a member of the USA Women's Pan American Team which participated in basketball at the 2015 Pan American Games held in Toronto from July 10–26, 2015.

== College career ==
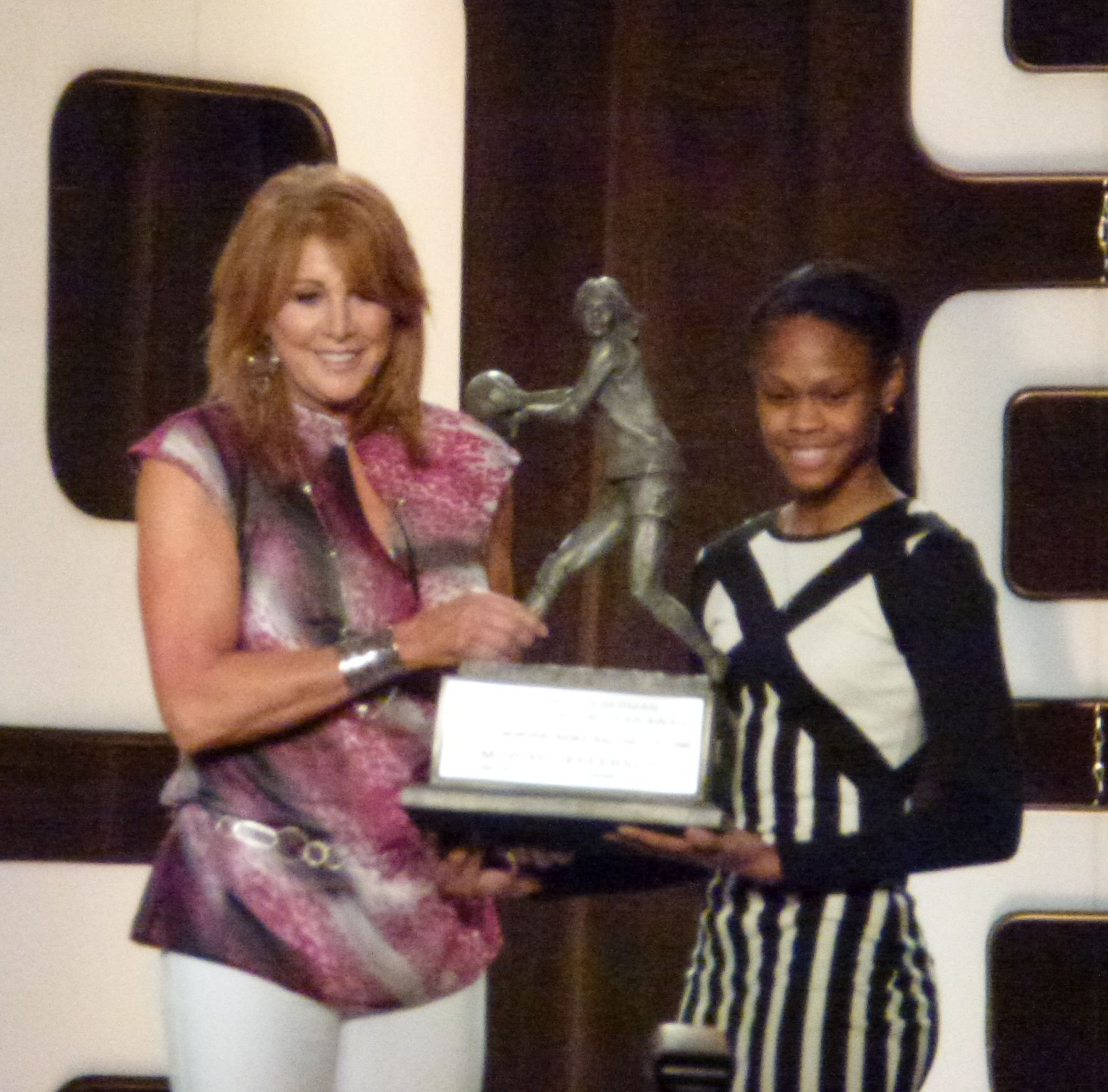
Jefferson (right) receiving the Nancy Lieberman Award in 2015

Jefferson led UConn to a 151–5 record over her four-year career, which included four consecutive National Championships. She finished her career in 22nd place on the UConn scoring list with 1,532, all-time leader in assists with 659, and second in steals with 353. Her 195 assists in 2013–14 is the fifth-highest single-season mark in school history, while her 191 assists in 2014–15 is the sixth-best single-season total. She became the second player in UConn history to dish out 200 assists. She became only the second Husky all-time to record back-to-back years with at least 100 steals. Jefferson's 191 assists during the 2014–15 season were the most by a UConn junior, while her 204 assists in 2015–16 is the best single-season total. Jefferson was named the 2014–2015 American Athletic Conference and WBCA NCAA Division I Defensive Player of the Year, and Consensus first team All-American for the second straight season. Jefferson is the third UConn player to earn the Nancy Lieberman Award (nation's top point guard) and one of only five players in the award's history to claim the honor twice.

== Professional career ==
=== WNBA ===
After being drafted second overall by the San Antonio Stars in the 2016 WNBA draft, Jefferson immediately became a starter on the team. During her rookie season, Jefferson scored a game-winning putback to beat the buzzer as part of her career-high 31 points to help San Antonio defeat the Indiana Fever 87–85 in overtime on July 1, 2016. She was named to the WNBA All-Rookie Team by the end of the season. She missed 13 games during the 2017 season due to a knee injury. On September 27, 2017, she had a surgery to fix the cartilage in her right knee. After rehabilitating for nine months, and missing the first 17 games of the 2018 season, she returned to practice on June 21, 2018.

On May 16, 2019, Jefferson was traded to the Dallas Wings but chose to sit out the 2019 season to continue with rehabilitation. She made her debut for the Wings during the 2020 season but suffered another season ending injury to her right knee.

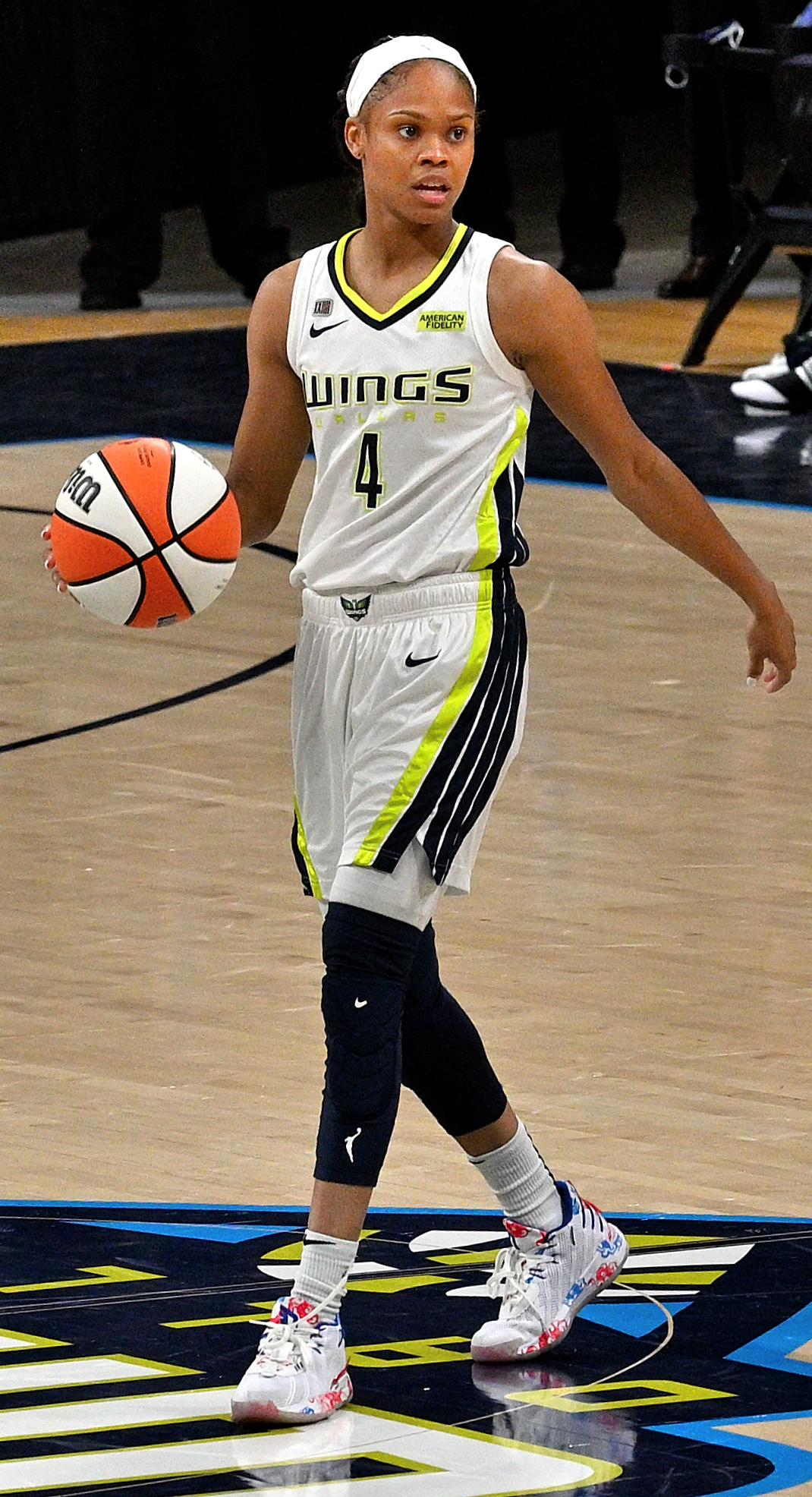
Jefferson with the Dallas Wings in 2021.

On May 9, 2022, Jefferson was waived by the Wings. Four days later, on May 13, Jefferson joined the Minnesota Lynx.

On February 2023, she was signed by the Phoenix Mercury.

On February 3, 2024, Jefferson was traded to the Connecticut Sun in exchange for Rebecca Allen.

On July 17, 2024, Jefferson was traded to the Chicago Sky alongside Rachel Banham, a 2025 1st round pick and the rights to swap 2026 first round picks, in exchange for Marina Mabrey and a 2025 2nd round pick.

On July 28, 2025, Jefferson was waived by the Sky.

=== Turkey ===
In August 2016, Jefferson signed with Galatasaray of the Turkish Women's Basketball League (KBSL) for the 2016–17 season. For the season, she averaged 18.5 points and 4.9 assists, and helped it reach the KBSL semi-finals. She returned to Galatasaray for the 2018–19 season where she averaged 13.4 points and once again helped the team to the semi-finals.

== Endorsements ==
In September 2016, Jefferson was featured in the Adidas "Sport Needs Creators" ad alongside athletes including Von Miller of the Denver Broncos, Paul Pogba of Manchester United, and James Harden of the Houston Rockets.

== Career statistics ==
Legend
GP	Games played	GS	Games started	MPG	Minutes per game	RPG	Rebounds per game
APG	Assists per game	SPG	Steals per game	BPG	Blocks per game	PPG	Points per game
TO	Turnovers per game	FG%	Field-goal percentage	3P%	3-point field-goal percentage	FT%	Free-throw percentage
**Bold**	Career best	°	League leader

*	Denotes seasons in which Jefferson won an NCAA championship

=== WNBA ===
==== Regular season ====
Stats current as of game on July 24, 2025

WNBA regular season statistics
Year	Team	GP	GS	MPG	FG%	3P%	FT%	RPG	APG	SPG	BPG	TO	PPG
2016	San Antonio	34	34	**30.4**	.426	.375	.775	2.1	4.2	**1.6**	0.1	1.7	**13.9**
2017	San Antonio	21	9	24.5	**.523**	.450	.741	1.8	4.4	1.5	0.1	2.0	9.1
2018	Las Vegas	16	0	15.7	.379	.200	.810	1.3	2.1	0.6	0.0	1.0	5.4
2019	Did not play (injury)												
2020	Dallas	9	6	16.4	.409	.333	.583	**3.1**	2.0	0.8	**0.2**	1.7	5.0
2021	Dallas	29	28	17.2	.449	.460	.600	2.0	2.5	0.8	**0.2**	1.4	5.4
2022	Dallas	1	0	4.0	—	—	—	0.0	0.0	0.0	0.0	**0.0**	0.0
2022	Minnesota	30	30	26.8	.452	**.474**	.815	2.5	**4.9**	1.2	0.1	2.2	10.8
2023	Phoenix	**39**	36	24.9	.434	.355	.820	2.0	3.6	1.1	**0.2**	1.6	10.5
2024	Connecticut	9	0	6.8	.375	.333	**1.000**	0.2	0.7	0.7	0.0	0.2	2.1
2024	Chicago	14	0	8.9	.115	.100	.833	0.5	1.7	0.1	0.0	0.4	0.9
2025	Chicago	5	1	7.0	.375	.333	—	1.0	1.8	0.0	0.0	0.4	1.4
**Career**	9 years, 6 teams	207	144	21.5	.435	.388	.785	1.9	3.3	1.0	0.1	1.5	8.3

==== Playoffs ====
WNBA playoff statistics
Year	Team	GP	GS	MPG	FG%	3P%	FT%	RPG	APG	SPG	BPG	TO	PPG
2021	Dallas	1	1	25.0	.571	.333	.000	2.0	4.0	2.0	0.0	4.0	9.0
**Career**	1 year, 1 team	1	1	25.0	.571	.333	.000	2.0	4.0	2.0	0.0	4.0	9.0

=== College ===
NCAA statistics
Year	Team	GP	Points	FG%	3P%	FT%	RPG	APG	SPG	BPG	PPG
2012–13*	UConn	39	182	.424	.266	.760	1.6	1.8	1.3	0.1	4.7
2013–14*	UConn	40	400	.575	.418	.768	**3.4**	4.9	**2.7**	**0.2**	10.0
2014–15*	UConn	39	**485**	**.587**	**.496**	.843	2.9	4.9	2.6	0.1	12.4
2015–16*	UConn	37	465	.557	.431	**.894**	2.5	**5.5**	2.6	**0.2**	**12.6**
**Career**		155	1532	.550	.420	.818	2.6	4.3	2.3	0.2	9.9

== Awards and honors ==
- WNBA All-Rookie Team (2016)
- WNBA 3-point field goal percentage leader: (2022)
- 2012—WBCA High School Coaches' All-America Team
- 2014—AP All-American Honorable Mention
- 2015—WBCA All-America Team
- 2015—Nancy Lieberman Award
- 2016—Nancy Lieberman Award
- 2016—Dawn Staley Award
