= Sophie Cunningham =

American basketball player (born 1996)

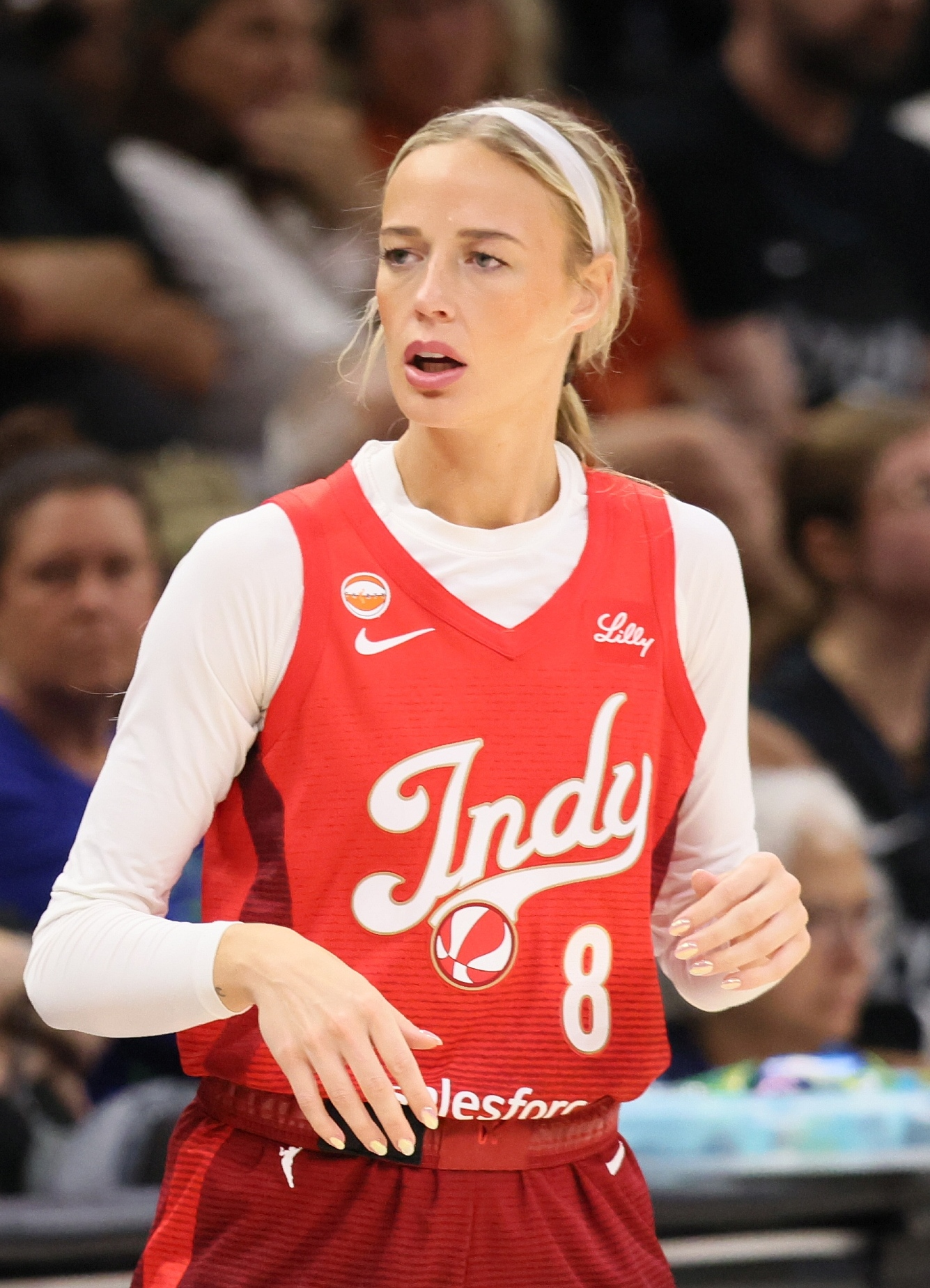
- Cunningham with the Indiana Fever in 2026

No. 8 – Indiana Fever
- Position: Shooting guard / small forward
- League: WNBA

Personal information
- Born: August 16, 1996 (age 30) Columbia, Missouri, U.S.
- Listed height: 6 ft 1 in (1.85 m)
- Listed weight: 156 lb (71 kg)

Career information
- High school: Rock Bridge (Columbia, Missouri)
- College: Missouri (2015–2019)
- WNBA draft: 2019: 2nd round, 13th overall pick
- Drafted by: Phoenix Mercury
- Playing career: 2019–present

Career history
- 2019–2024: Phoenix Mercury
- 2019–2020: Melbourne Boomers
- 2025–present: Indiana Fever

Career highlights
- WNBA Commissioner's Cup champion (2025); Third-team All-American – AP, USBWA (2019); 3× First-team All-SEC (2017–2019); SEC Freshman of the Year (2016); SEC All-Freshman Team (2016); McDonald's All-American (2015); Co-Miss Show-Me Basketball (2015)
- Stats at Basketball Reference

Sophie Elizabeth Cunningham (born August 16, 1996) is an American professional basketball player for the Indiana Fever of the Women's National Basketball Association (WNBA). She played college basketball for the Missouri Tigers.

Cunningham attended Rock Bridge High School in her hometown of Columbia, Missouri, where she was a five-star recruit and led her team to four straight state titles. She played four collegiate seasons with the Missouri Tigers, becoming the program's all-time leading scorer. A three-time first-team All-Southeastern Conference (SEC) selection, she was named a third-team All-American in her senior season with Missouri.

Selected by the Phoenix Mercury in the 2nd Round with the 13th pick in the 2019 WNBA draft, Cunningham played for the team in her first six seasons in the WNBA, developing into one of the league's most accurate three-point specialists. In 2025, she was traded to the Indiana Fever, where she is a key reserve and has drawn national attention as an enforcer for teammate Caitlin Clark.

== Early life ==
Sophie Elizabeth Cunningham was born in Columbia, Missouri, on August 16, 1996, to Jim and Paula Cunningham. Her parents were both student athletes at the University of Missouri in Columbia, along with other members of her family.

Cunningham played in a youth soccer league while in grade school. Cunningham attended Rock Bridge High School, starring on the girls' basketball and volleyball teams. When the kicker on the football team had an ACL tear, ending his season, Cunningham joined the football team as the kicker as well, going two for four on FG attempts.

== College career ==
Cunningham played four seasons of college basketball at the University of Missouri for the Tigers. In 129 career starts, she averaged 17.0 ppg, 5.4 rpg and 3.0 apg for the Tigers.

== Professional career ==
=== Phoenix Mercury (2019–2024) ===
Cunningham was selected as the thirteenth (13th) overall pick, the first pick in the second round, of the 2019 WNBA draft by the Phoenix Mercury. She was the eighth University of Missouri alumna to be drafted into the WNBA and was the highest selection for a former Tiger. In her rookie year, she appeared in 32 games, mostly off the bench, starting just five; she finished the season with 28 field goals in 79 attempts, went 30-for-34 in free throws, had 45 rebounds, 25 assists, 11 steals and four blocks while scoring 100 points. In the postseason, she scored three points in the Mercury's only game.

The 2020 season saw Cunningham appear in a career-low 21 games, though she started 11. She was productive in her limited playing time, with 35 field goals, 12 three-pointers and 22 field goals. In two playoff games for the Mercury, she recorded two field goals and a three-pointer.

Cunningham came off the bench for the Mercury in their resurgent 2021 season. In 30 games, she averaged 17.5 minutes per game, posting 5.6 points, 2.0 rebounds, 1.1 assists and 0.5 steals. She shot 43.7% from the field, including 41.0% on 3-pointers, and 70.4% from the free throw line. She played in eight of the team's 11 postseason games, missing three due to a calf strain, as the Mercury made it to the WNBA Finals, including a 21-point performance against the New York Liberty in the second round. In Game 2 of the Finals, she recorded nine points, five rebounds and two assists in the Mercury's 91-86 overtime win against the Chicago Sky to tie the series. Her two three-pointers in the second quarter put Phoenix within three points. In the third game, she scored a three-pointer. Cunningham scored 51 points in the posteason, but the Mercury lost to the Sky 3-games-to-1.

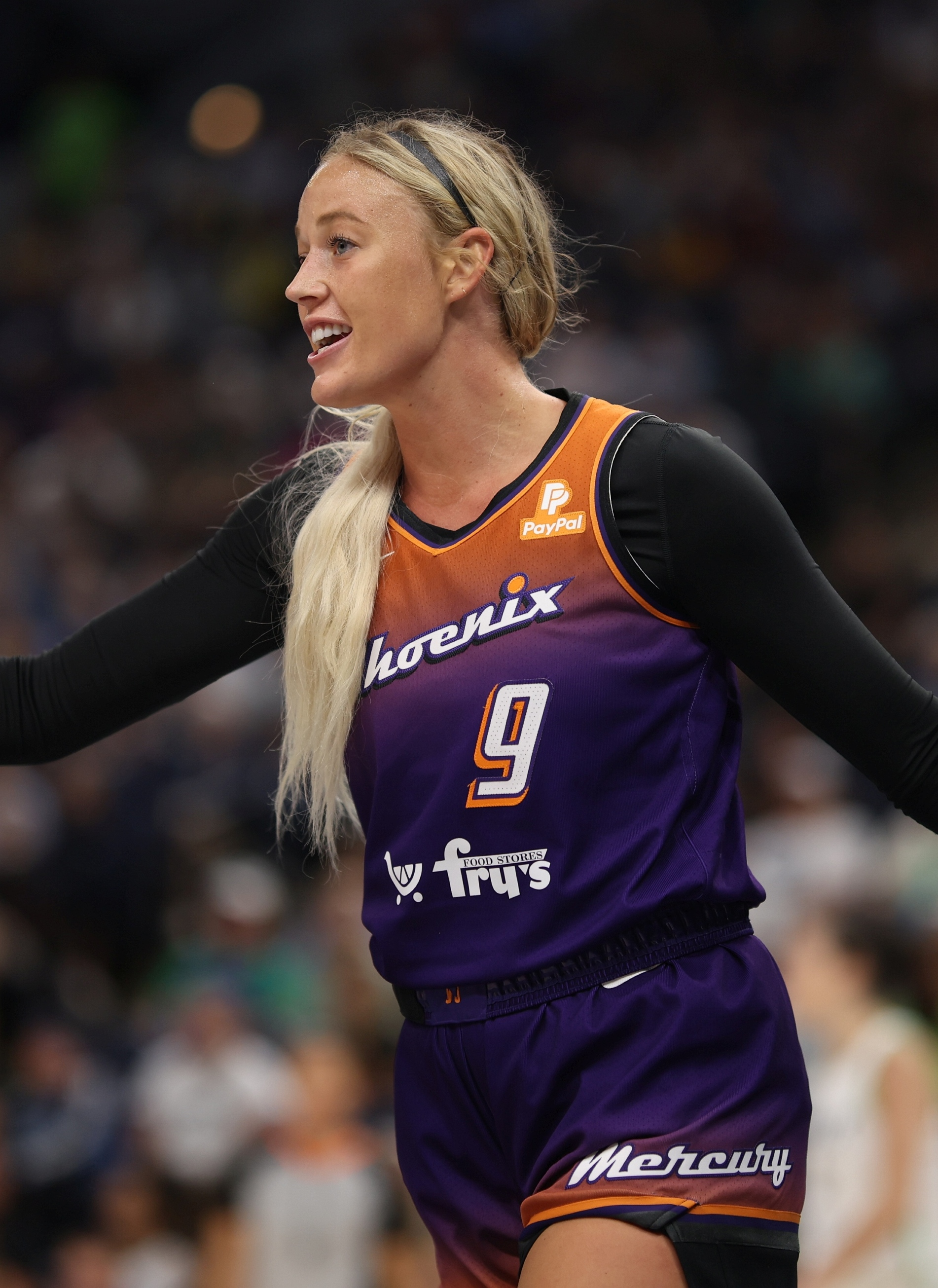
Cunningham with the Phoenix Mercury in 2023

Cunningham started a then-career-high 20 games in 2022 and responded with dramatic improvement. She recorded 120 field goals, 70 three-pointers, and made 42 of her 48 free throw attempts. She posted career-highs in offensive rebounds (19), and points (352), and her 104 defensive rebounds were also a career-high to that point in her career. In two playoff games, she had five field goals, two free throws and five rebounds, scoring 15 total points.

Cunningham's playing time continued to increase in 2023, this time starting all 31 games she played in. She finished the year with 111 field goals, 58 three-pointers, and a career-high 70 free throws. Despite this, the team finished 9-31, good for sixth in the Western Conference, missing the playoffs for the first time in her career.

The Mercury rebounded in 2024, finishing 19-24 and finishing fourth in the Conference. Cunningham played in a career-high 40 games that season, and recorded 103 field goals, 68 three-pointers, 60 free throws, and played improved defense. Her 141 defensive rebounds and 41 steals were both career-highs, and her ten blocks tied for second-most in her career. In two playoff games, Cunningham had ten field goals, three three-pointers, nine rebounds, seven assists, three steals and a block as the Minnesota Lynx defeated the Mercury two-games-to-zero to advance to the second round.

=== Indiana Fever (2025–present) ===
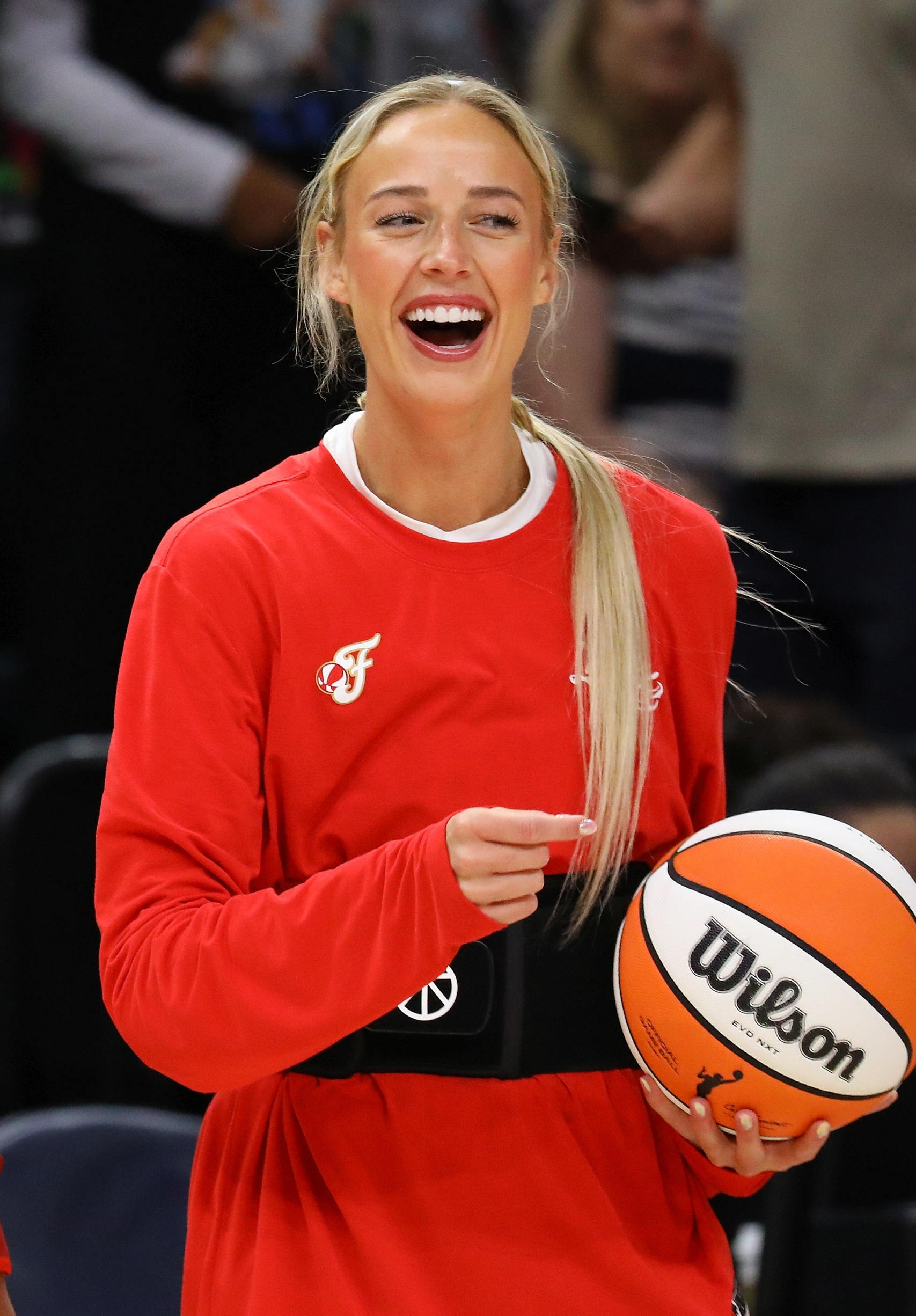
Cunningham with the Indiana Fever in 2026

On January 31, 2025, Cunningham was traded to the Indiana Fever in a four-team trade which also included the Dallas Wings and Connecticut Sun. Cunningham has earned recognition as the Fever's "enforcer" after she was ejected from a game against the Connecticut Sun for committing a Flagrant 2 foul by grabbing Jacy Sheldon and pulling her to the ground in retribution for Sheldon poking teammate Caitlin Clark in the eye earlier in the game. The incident went viral.

In the second quarter of the Fever's match-up at Connecticut on August 17, Cunningham left the game with a right knee injury after Connecticut Sun guard, Bria Hartley, stumbled into the paint and fell into Cunningham's leg. On August 19, the Fever said that Cunningham would be out for the remainder of the Fever's season due to her right knee injury. She confirmed reports saying she tore her right MCL, on the August 19 episode of her podcast, "Show Me Something." For the season, she had 82 field goals, 51 three-pointers, 42 free throws, 105 rebounds and 29 steals.

On April 12, 2026, it was announced that Cunningham had re-signed with the Fever.

During a June 22 game against the Phoenix Mercury, Caitlin Clark was called for a technical foul after getting wrapped up with her former teammate DeWanna Bonner. After Clark's foul was called, Cunningham asked the referees why Bonner did not also receive a foul, pointing at her. Bonner told Cunningham to stop pointing at her, and both players were called for technical fouls. Cunningham continued to point at Bonner for over 20 seconds until she was ushered back to her team's bench. Cunningham's pointing later became a meme.

== Off the court ==
Cunningham is a Christian. In 2026, she said that her faith "keeps me grounded" and described being baptized as an adult as "one of the better things I've done in my life". She regularly re-shares content from Christian accounts on X and Instagram stories. Cunningham has described her political views as "very much in the middle."

In a July 2026 feature story by ESPN, Cunningham spoke out against the participation of transgender women in women's sports, citing a desire to "protect young girls in a locker room, or young girls in sport who shouldn't have to go against biological men." She later reiterated her view on the topic, calling it "common sense." Her statements were widely praised by conservative political figures and commentators, including US vice president JD Vance and White House press secretary Karoline Leavitt. Demonstrations both supporting and criticizing Cunningham were held before several Fever games.

=== Television ===
In December 2022, Cunningham became a recurring analyst for the Phoenix Suns on their Suns Live! pregame, halftime, and post-game TV coverage.

On July 11, 2026, Cunningham appeared as a ring girl at UFC 329, for the co-main event between Paddy Pimblett and Benoît Saint Denis. UFC CEO Dana White said that he hired Cunningham eight minutes before her appearance, after she casually joked about taking the role.

== Career statistics ==
Legend
GP	Games played	GS	Games started	MPG	Minutes per game	RPG	Rebounds per game
APG	Assists per game	SPG	Steals per game	BPG	Blocks per game	PPG	Points per game
TO	Turnovers per game	FG%	Field-goal percentage	3P%	3-point field-goal percentage	FT%	Free-throw percentage
**Bold**	Career best	°	League leader

=== WNBA ===
==== Regular season ====
Stats current through end of 2026 season

WNBA regular season statistics
Year	Team	GP	GS	MPG	FG%	3P%	FT%	RPG	APG	SPG	BPG	TO	PPG
2019	Phoenix	32	5	12.2	.354	.304	**.882**	1.4	.8	.3	.1	.6	3.1
2020	Phoenix	21	11	18.9	.385	.235	.880	1.0	.8	.5	.1	.7	5.0
2021	Phoenix	30	4	17.5	.437	.410	.704	2.0	1.1	.5	.2	**.5**	5.6
2022	Phoenix	28	20	**29.5**	.449	.400	.875	**4.4**	1.6	**1.0**	**.4**	1.0	**12.6**
2023	Phoenix	31	**31**	29.0	.413	.337	.875	2.8	**2.1**	.6	**.4**	1.5	11.3
2024	Phoenix	40	21	27.8	.429	.378	.870	3.9	2.0	**1.0**	.3	1.0	8.4
2025	Indiana	30	13	25.2	**.469**	**.432**	.875	3.5	1.2	**1.0**	.1	1.1	8.6
2026	Indiana	**43**	3	22.2	.460	.419	.851	2.3	1.2	.5	.1	.7	7.9
**Career**	8 years, 2 teams	225	108	23.0	.433	.380	.859	2.7	1.4	.7	.2	.9	7.9

==== Playoffs ====
WNBA playoff statistics
Year	Team	GP	GS	MPG	FG%	3P%	FT%	RPG	APG	SPG	BPG	TO	PPG
2019	Phoenix	1	0	8.0	**1.000**	**1.000**°	.000	.0	.0	.0	.0	**.0**	3.0
2020	Phoenix	2	0	9.5	.500	.333	—	1.0	.0	.0	.0	1.5	2.5
2021	Phoenix	**8**	**2**	17.5	.484	.565	**1.000**	2.1	.8	.3	**.9**	.8	6.4
2022	Phoenix	2	**2**	31.0	.455	.375	.333	2.5	2.0	.5	.0	2.5	**7.5**
2024	Phoenix	2	**2**	**31.5**	.500	.429	—	**4.5**	**3.5**	**1.5**	.5	.5	6.5
2025	Indiana	Did not play (injury)											
2026	Indiana	3	0	25.3	.429	.444	**1.000**	1.3	.7	.7	.0	.3	7.3
**Career**	6 years, 2 teams	18	6	20.4	.479	.490	.727	2.1	1.1	.4	.4	.9	6.1

=== College ===
NCAA statistics
Year	Team	GP	GS	MPG	FG%	3P%	FT%	RPG	APG	SPG	BPG	TO	PPG
2015–16	Missouri	32	32	30.1	.502	.356	.831	5.8	3.0	1.1	**.3**	**2.4**	14.0
2016–17	Missouri	31	31	32.9	.482	.379	**.848**	5.3	**3.4**	.9	**.3**	3.4	17.5
2017–18	Missouri	31	31	32.7	**.542**	**.457**	.836	4.7	3.0	.8	.1	3.0	**18.5**
2018–19	Missouri	**35**	**35**	**34.3**	.481	.403	.839	**5.9**	2.8	**1.2**	**.3**	2.9	17.8
**Career**		129	129	37.5	.501	.403	.839	5.4	3.0	1.0	.3	2.9	17.0
