= 2023 WNBA draft =

Basketball player selection

2023 WNBA Draft

General information
- Sport: Basketball
- Date: April 10, 2023
- Location: Spring Studios New York; Manhattan, New York City
- Networks: United States: ESPN; Canada: TSN3/5

Overview
- League: WNBA
- Teams: 12
- First selection: Aliyah Boston, Indiana Fever

The 2023 WNBA (Women's National Basketball Association) Draft, the WNBA's draft for the 2023 WNBA season and 28th draft in WNBA history, was held following the 2022–23 NCAA Division I women's basketball season. The 2023 draft took place at Spring Studios New York on April 10, 2023. It was exclusively televised on ESPN in the United States and on TSN3/5 in Canada at 7:00 p.m. EDT.

== Draft lottery ==
The lottery selection to determine the order of the top four picks in the 2023 draft took place on November 11, 2022, and was televised on ESPN leading into ESPN's women's college basketball game that evening featuring defending National Champion South Carolina at Maryland. The four non-playoff teams in 2022 qualified from the lottery drawing: Indiana Fever, Atlanta Dream, Los Angeles Sparks, and the Minnesota Lynx. The Sparks made a trade in February 2022 that allowed their pick to ultimately end up with the Washington Mystics at the time of the drawing. Each team had a representative at the lottery drawing - Kelsey Mitchell for the Fever, Head Coach Tanisha Wright for the Dream, Natasha Cloud for the Mystics, and Napheesa Collier for the Lynx. The Fever won the lottery for the first time in franchise history and were awarded the top pick in the draft. The rest of the order went as the following: Lynx, Dream, and Mystics.

=== Lottery chances ===
Note: Team selected for No.1 pick noted in bold text

Team	Combined 2021–22 record	Lottery chances	Result
**Indiana Fever**	**11–57**	**44.2%**	**1st pick**
Atlanta Dream	22–46	27.6%	3rd pick
Washington Mystics (from Los Angeles)	25–43 (Note: Los Angeles' record)	17.8%	4th pick
Minnesota Lynx	36–32	10.4%	2nd pick

The lottery odds were based on combined records from the 2021 and 2022 WNBA seasons. In the drawing, 14 balls numbered 1–14 are placed in a lottery machine and mixed. Four balls are drawn to determine a four-digit combination (only 11–12–13–14 is ignored and redrawn). The team to which that four-ball combination is assigned receives the No. 1 pick. The four balls are then placed back into the machine and the process is repeated to determine the second pick. The two teams whose numerical combinations do not come up in the lottery will select in the inverse order of their two-year cumulative record. Ernst & Young knows the discreet results before they are announced.

The order of selection for the remainder of the first round as well as the second and third rounds was determined by inverse order of the teams' respective regular-season records solely from 2022.

== Eligibility ==
Under the current collective bargaining agreement (CBA) between the WNBA and its players' union, draft eligibility for players not defined as "international" requires the following to be true:

- The player's 22nd birthday falls during the calendar year of the draft. For this draft, the cutoff birth date is December 31, 2001.
- She has either:
  - completed her college eligibility;
  - received a bachelor's degree, or is scheduled to receive such in the 3 months following the draft; or
  - is at least 4 years removed from high school graduation.

A player who is scheduled to receive her bachelor's degree within 3 months of the draft date, and is younger than the cutoff age, is only eligible if the calendar year of the draft is no earlier than the fourth after her high school graduation.

Players with remaining college eligibility who meet the cutoff age must notify the WNBA headquarters of their intent to enter the draft no later than 10 days before the draft date, and must renounce any remaining college eligibility to do so. A separate notification timetable is provided for players involved in postseason tournaments (most notably the NCAA Division I tournament); those players (normally) must declare for the draft within 24 hours of their final game.

"International players" are defined as those for whom all of the following is true:

- Born and currently residing outside the U.S.
- Never "exercised intercollegiate basketball eligibility" in the U.S.

For "international players", the eligibility age is 20, also measured on December 31 of the year of the draft.

== Draft invitees ==
On April 7, 2023, the WNBA released the names of the players who would be invited to be in attendance at the draft.

- (Canada) Laeticia Amihere, South Carolina
- (United States) Brea Beal, South Carolina
- (United States) Grace Berger, Indiana
- (United States) Aliyah Boston, South Carolina
- (United States) Zia Cooke, South Carolina
- (United States) Jordan Horston, Tennessee
- (United States) Ashley Joens, Iowa State
- (United States) Haley Jones, Stanford
- (Hungary) Dorka Juhász, UConn
- (Mexico) Lou Lopez Sénéchal, UConn
- (United States) Taylor Mikesell, Ohio State
- (United States) Diamond Miller, Maryland
- (United States) Alexis Morris, LSU
- (United States) Maddy Siegrist, Villanova
- (Brazil) Stephanie Soares, Iowa State

== Draft ==
*	Denotes player who has been selected for at least one All-Star Game and All-WNBA Team
^{+}	Denotes player who has been selected for at least one All-Star Game
^{#}	Denotes player who never played in the WNBA regular season or playoffs
**Bold**	Denotes player who won Rookie of the Year

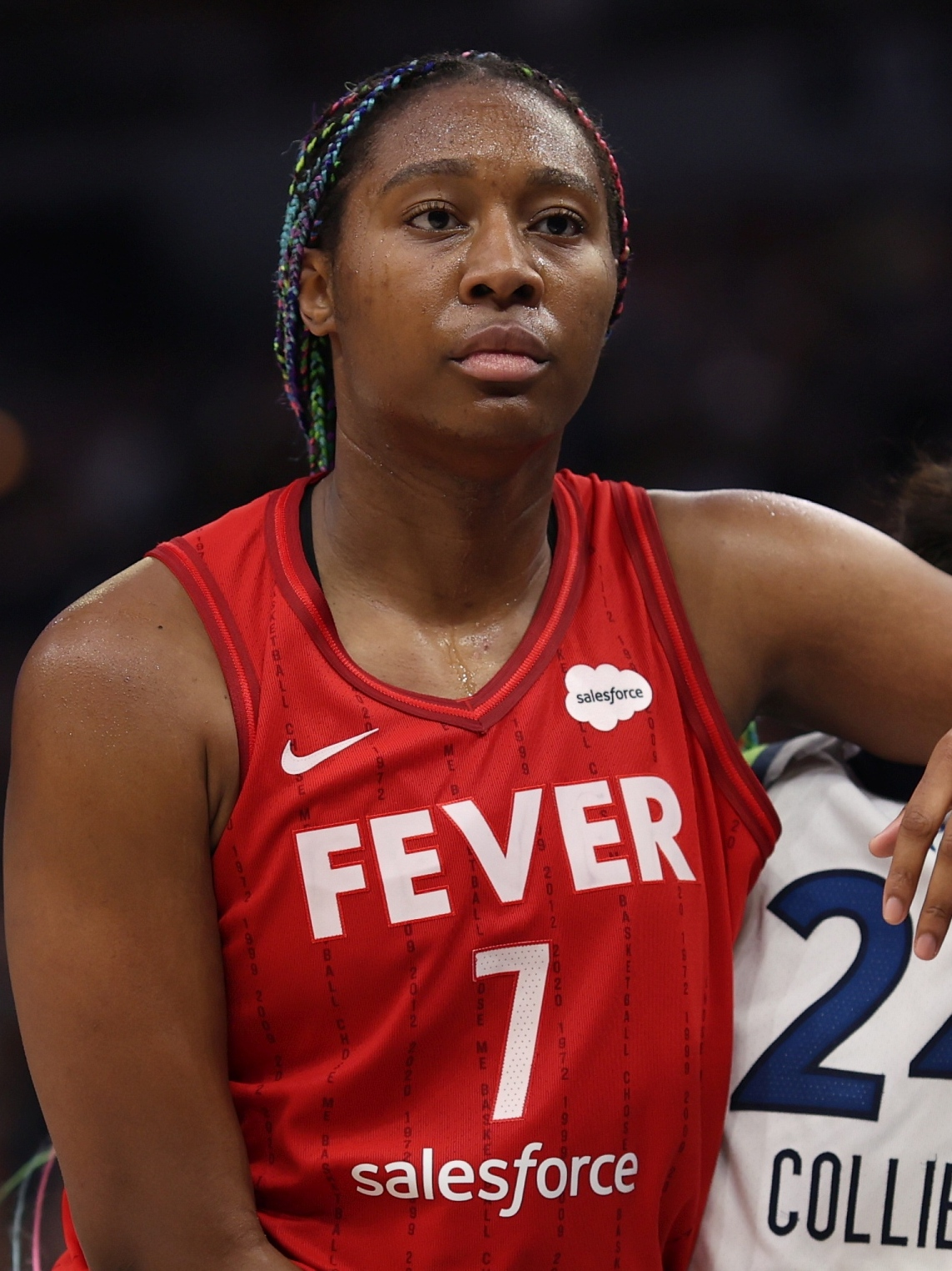
Aliyah Boston was selected 1st overall by the Indiana Fever.

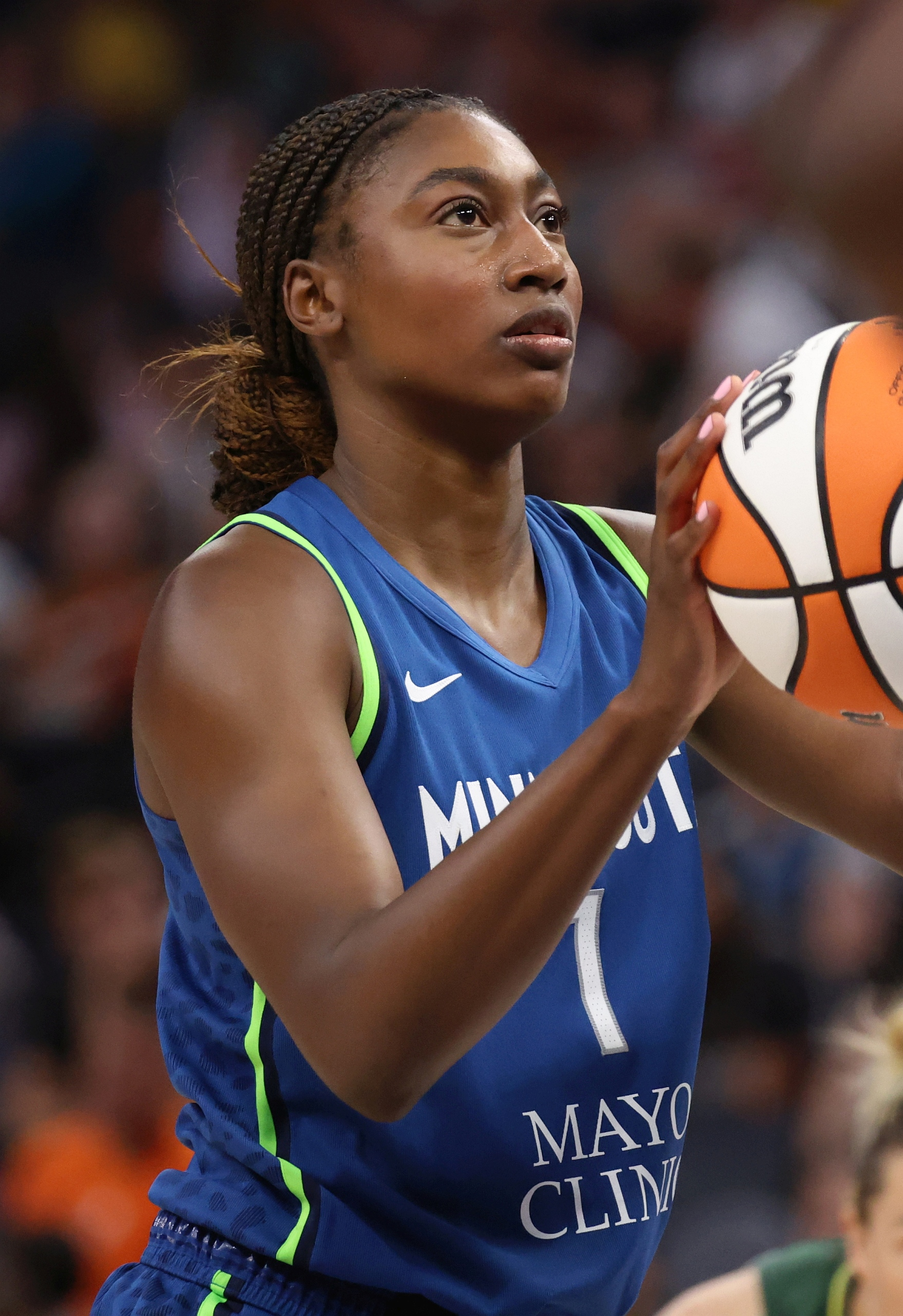
Diamond Miller was selected 2nd overall by the Minnesota Lynx.

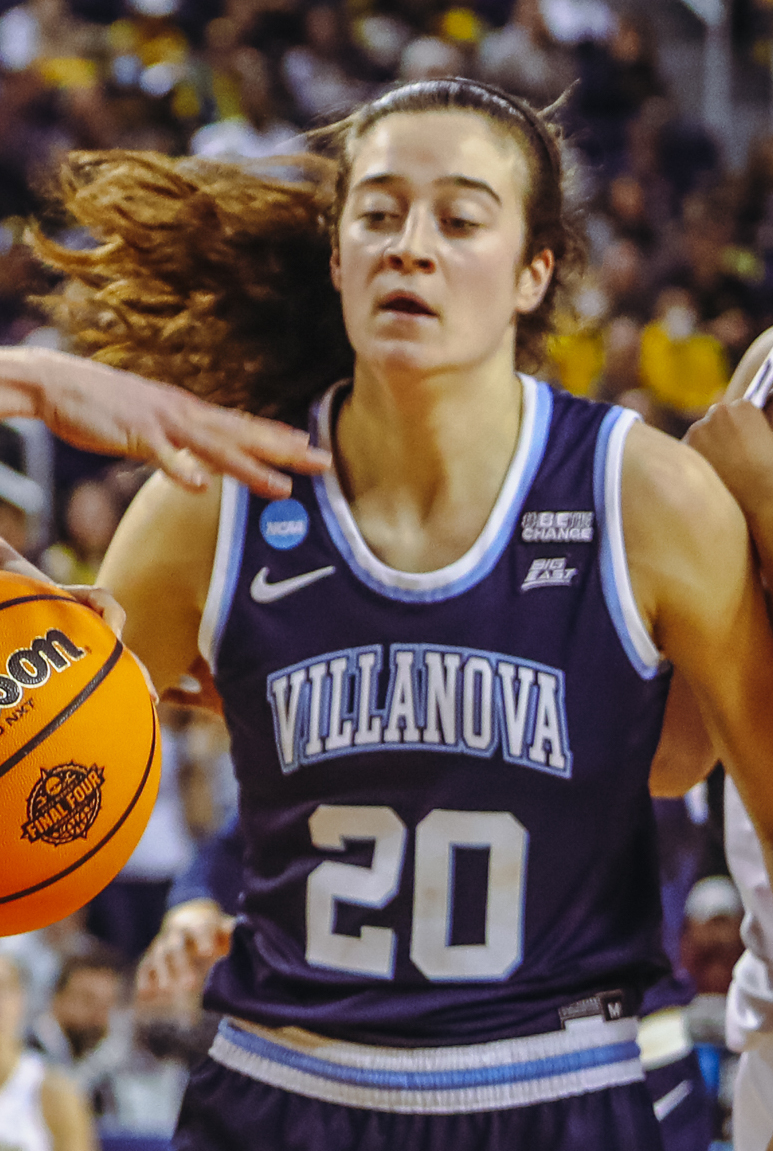
Maddy Siegrist was selected 3rd overall by the Dallas Wings.

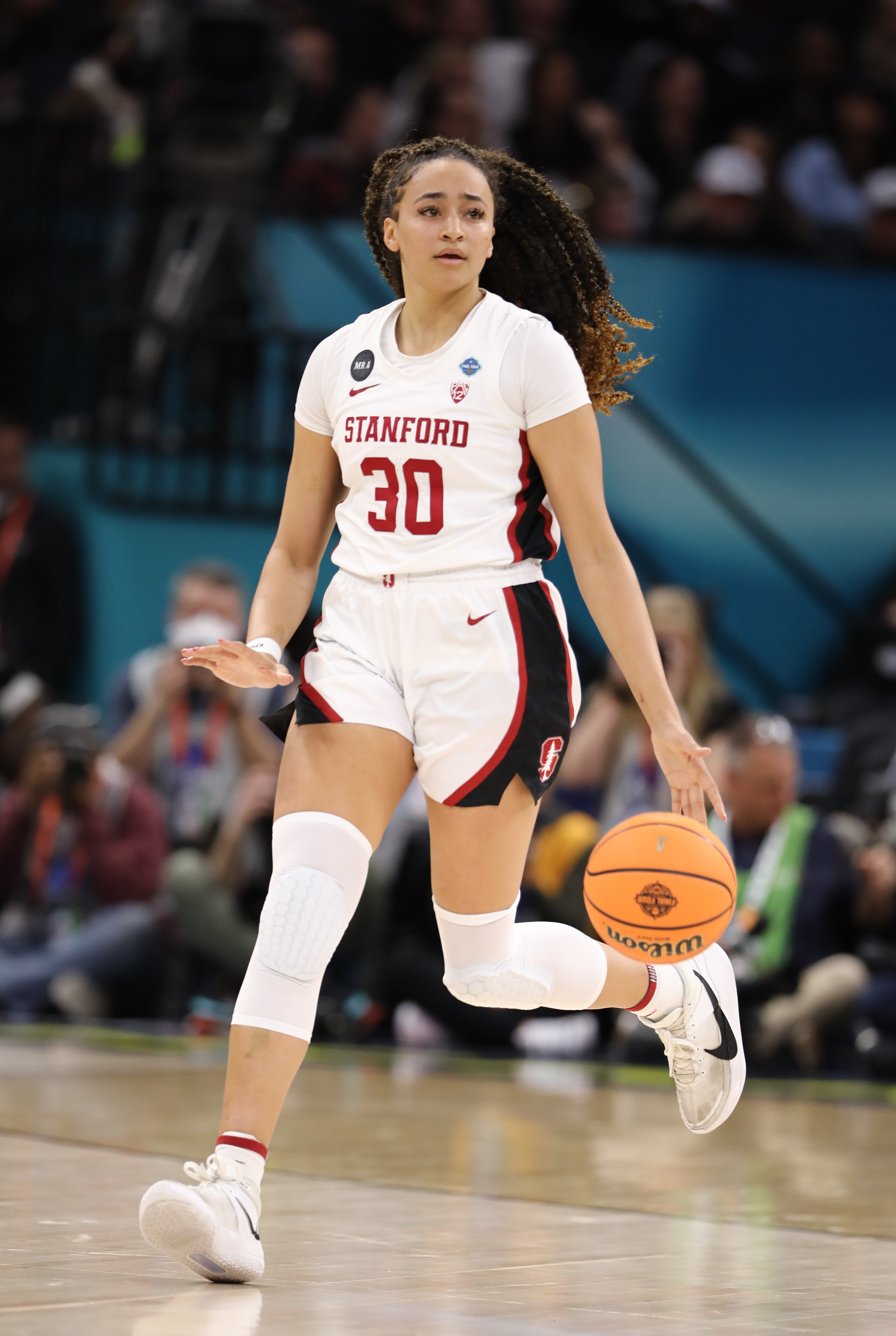
Haley Jones was selected 6th overall by the Atlanta Dream.

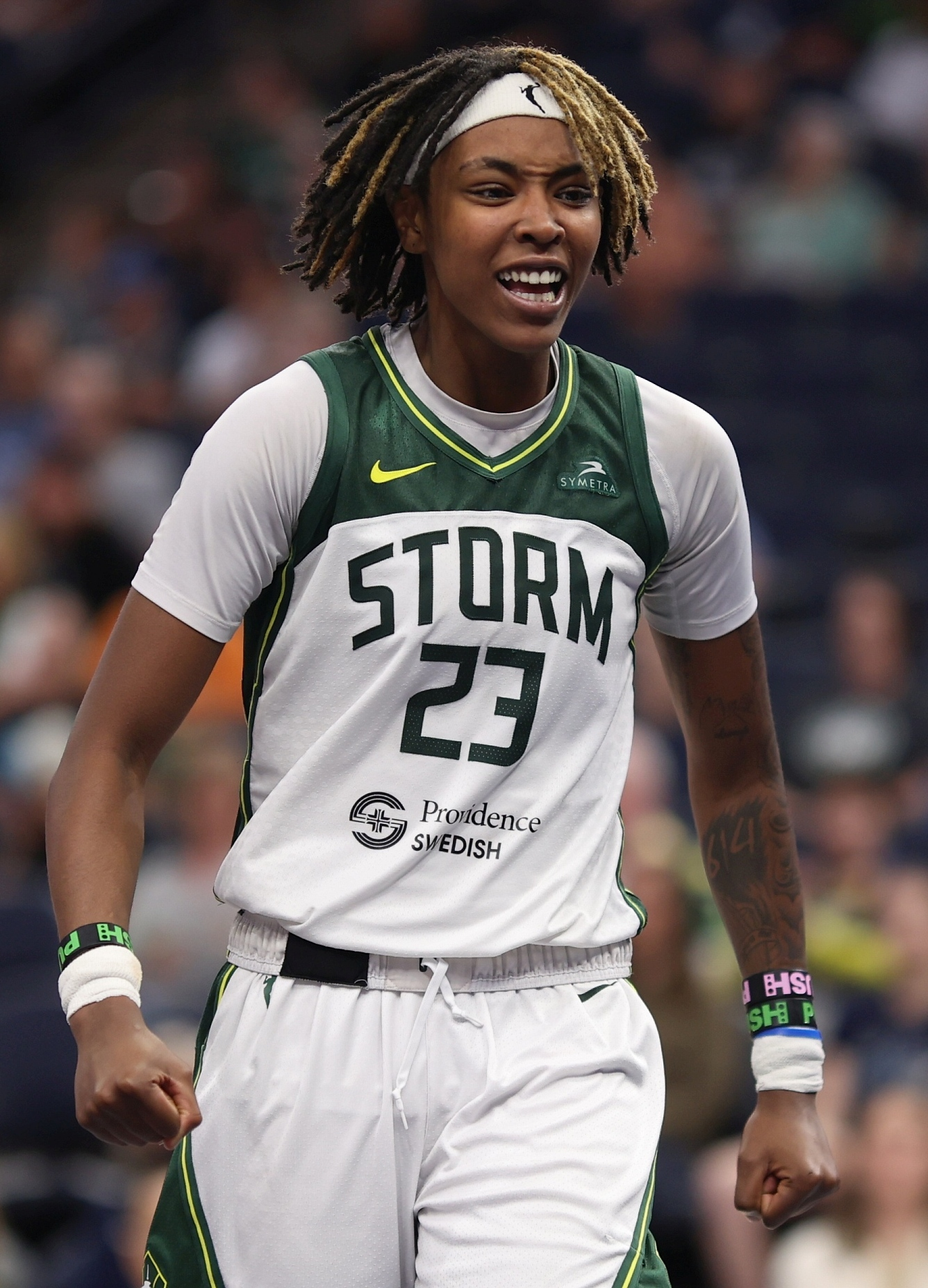
Jordan Horston was selected 9th overall by the Seattle Storm.

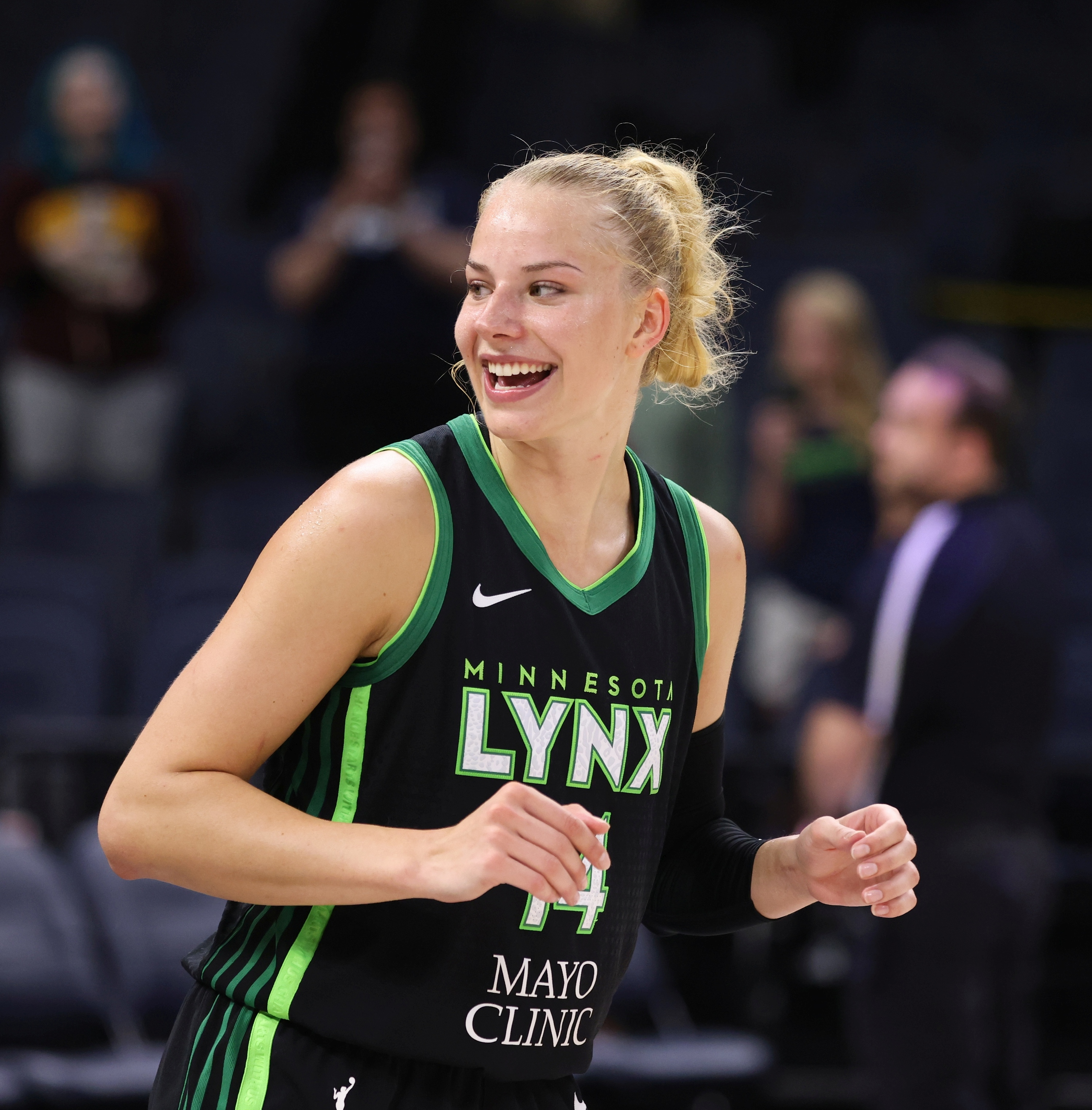
Dorka Juhász was selected 16th overall by the Minnesota Lynx.

=== First round ===
Pick	Player	Nationality	Team	School / club team
1	**Aliyah Boston** *	United States	Indiana Fever	South Carolina
2	Diamond Miller	United States	Minnesota Lynx	Maryland
3	Maddy Siegrist	United States	Dallas Wings (from Atlanta) (Note: January 21, 2023: Atlanta to Dallas: Atlanta acquired Allisha Gray; Dallas acquired 2023 and 2025 first-round picks)	Villanova
4	Stephanie Soares	Brazil	Washington Mystics (from Los Angeles via Atlanta, traded to Dallas) (Note: February 5, 2022: Los Angeles to Atlanta: Atlanta acquired Erica Wheeler, a 2022 second-round pick, and a 2023 first-round pick; Los Angeles acquired Chennedy Carter and the rights to Li Yueru) (Note: April 6, 2022: Atlanta to Washington: Atlanta acquired 2022 (1st overall) and 2023 first-round picks; Washington acquired 2022 first- and second-round picks (3rd and 14th overall), and option to swap its own 2023 first-round pick with the 2023 first-round pick Atlanta acquired from Los Angeles) (Note: April 10, 2023: Washington to Dallas: Dallas acquired the rights to Stephanie Soares; Washington acquired 2024 second-round and 2025 first-round picks (via Atlanta))	Iowa State
5	Lou Lopez Sénéchal	Mexico	Dallas Wings (from Phoenix via Chicago) (Note: February 3, 2022: Three-team trade among Chicago, Indiana, and Phoenix: Chicago acquired Julie Allemand from Indiana and a 2023 first-round pick from Phoenix; Indiana acquired Bria Hartley, 2022 and 2023 first-round pick from Chicago, 2022 and 2023 second-round picks from Phoenix; Phoenix acquired Diamond DeShields) (Note: February 11, 2023: Four-team trade among Chicago, Dallas, New York, and Phoenix: Chicago acquired Marina Mabrey and a 2024 second-round pick (from Phoenix); New York acquired rights to Leonie Fiebich, a 2024 second-round pick (from Chicago), and the right to swap 2025 first-round picks (from Phoenix); Phoenix acquired Michaela Onyenwere, 2024 third-round pick (from Chicago), and 2025 second-round pick (from Chicago); Dallas acquired Diamond DeShields, 2023 and 2024 first-round picks (from Chicago), and the right to swap 2025 first-round picks (from Chicago))	UConn
6	Haley Jones	United States	Atlanta Dream (from New York via Connecticut) (Note: January 16, 2023: Three-team trade among New York, Connecticut, and Dallas: Connecticut acquired Rebecca Allen and a 2023 first-round pick from New York, and Tyasha Harris from Dallas; Dallas acquired Natasha Howard and Crystal Dangerfield from New York; New York acquired Jonquel Jones from Connecticut and Kayla Thornton from Dallas) (Note: February 9, 2023: Connecticut to Atlanta: Connecticut acquired rights to Tiffany Hayes; Atlanta acquired a 2023 first-round pick (6th overall))	Stanford
7	Grace Berger	United States	Indiana Fever (from Dallas) (Note: March 8, 2022: Indiana to Dallas: Indiana acquired two 2022 first-round picks (4th and 6th) and a 2023 first-round pick; Dallas acquired Teaira McCowan, a 2022 first-round pick, and Chicago's 2023 first-round pick)	Indiana
8	Laeticia Amihere	Canada	Atlanta Dream (from Washington)	South Carolina
9	Jordan Horston	United States	Seattle Storm	Tennessee
10	Zia Cooke	United States	Los Angeles Sparks (from Connecticut) (Note: January 16, 2023: Connecticut to Los Angeles: Connecticut acquired Olivia Nelson-Ododa, Jasmine Walker, and Kianna Smith; Los Angeles acquired Jasmine Thomas and a 2023 first-round pick)	South Carolina
11	Abby Meyers	United States	Dallas Wings (from Chicago via Indiana)	Maryland
12	Maïa Hirsch^{#}	France	Minnesota Lynx (from Las Vegas) (Note: April 10, 2022: Las Vegas to Minnesota: Vegas acquired a 2022 first- and second-round picks (8th and 13th overall); Minnesota acquired 2023 first- and second-round picks)	ESB Villeneuve-d'Ascq

=== Second round ===
Pick	Player	Nationality	Team	School / club team
13	Taylor Mikesell	United States	Indiana Fever	Ohio State
14	Shaneice Swain^{#}	Australia	Los Angeles Sparks	Cairns Dolphins
15	Leigha Brown	United States	Atlanta Dream	Michigan
16	Dorka Juhász	Hungary	Minnesota Lynx	UConn
17	LaDazhia Williams^{#}	United States	Indiana Fever (from Phoenix)	LSU
18	Madi Williams	United States	Seattle Storm (from New York) (Note: April 11, 2022: New York to Seattle: New York acquired Lorela Cubaj; Seattle acquired a 2023 second-round pick)	Oklahoma
19	Ashley Joens	United States	Dallas Wings	Iowa State
20	Elena Tsineke^{#}	Greece	Washington Mystics	South Florida
21	Dulcy Fankam Mendjiadeu	Cameroon	Seattle Storm	South Florida
22	Alexis Morris^{#}	United States	Connecticut Sun	LSU
23	Kayana Traylor	United States	Chicago Sky	Virginia Tech
24	Brea Beal^{#}	United States	Minnesota Lynx (from Las Vegas)	South Carolina

=== Third round ===
Pick	Player	Nationality	Team	School / club team
25	Victaria Saxton	United States	Indiana Fever	South Carolina
26	Monika Czinano^{#}	United States	Los Angeles Sparks	Iowa
27	Destiny Harden^{#}	United States	Phoenix Mercury (from Atlanta) (Note: January 31, 2022: Atlanta to Phoenix: Atlanta acquired Kia Vaughn; Phoenix acquired a 2023 third-round pick)	Miami
28	Taylor Soule	United States	Minnesota Lynx	Virginia Tech
29	Kadi Sissoko	France	Phoenix Mercury	USC
30	Okako Adika^{#}	Denmark	New York Liberty	USC
31	Paige Robinson^{#}	United States	Dallas Wings	Illinois State
32	Txell Alarcón^{#}	Spain	Washington Mystics	Araski AES
33	Jade Loville^{#}	United States	Seattle Storm	Arizona
34	Ashten Prechtel	United States	Connecticut Sun	Stanford
35	Kseniya Malashka^{#}	Belarus	Chicago Sky	Middle Tennessee
36	Brittany Davis^{#}	United States	Las Vegas Aces	Alabama

== See also ==
- List of first overall WNBA draft picks
