= South Carolina Gamecocks women's basketball statistical leaders =

The South Carolina Gamecocks women's basketball statistical leaders are individual statistical leaders of the South Carolina Gamecocks women's basketball program in various categories, including points, three-pointers, rebounds, assists, steals, and blocks. Within those areas, the lists identify single-game, single-season, and career leaders. The Gamecocks represent the University of South Carolina in the NCAA Division I Southeastern Conference.

South Carolina began competing in intercollegiate women's basketball in 1974, before the NCAA governed women's sports; in that era, the main governing body for women's college sports was the Association of Intercollegiate Athletics for Women (AIAW). The NCAA began governing women's sports in the 1981–82 school year; after one year in which both the NCAA and AIAW held national championship events, the AIAW folded. Because of South Carolina's relatively recent history in women's basketball, there is no "pre-modern" era of limited statistics; full box scores are available for all Iowa games, and the only rules change that seriously impacted statistical totals was the advent of the three-pointer, which was made mandatory in NCAA women's basketball in the 1987–88 season.

The NCAA has recorded individual scoring and rebounding totals since it began sponsoring women's sports championships. However, it did not officially record the other statistics included in this page until later. Assists were first officially recorded in women's basketball in the 1985–86 season. Blocks and steals were first officially recorded in 1987–88, the same season in which the use of the three-pointer was made mandatory. South Carolina only includes three-point statistics since the national adoption of that rule, but otherwise includes statistics from the entire history of South Carolina women's basketball.

These lists are updated through the end of the 2023–24 season.

== Scoring ==
Career
Rank	Player	Points	Seasons
1	A'ja Wilson	2389	2014–15 2015–16 2016–17 2017–18
2	Sheila Foster	2266	1978–79 1979–80 1980–81 1981–82
3	Shannon Johnson	2230	1992–93 1993–94 1994–95 1995–96
4	Brantley Southers	1982	1981–82 1982–83 1983–84 1984–85 1985–86
5	Aliyah Boston	1942	2019–20 2020–21 2021–22 2022–23
6	Jocelyn Penn	1939	1998–99 1999–2000 2001–02 2002–03
7	Tiffany Mitchell	1885	2012–13 2013–14 2014–15 2015–16
8	Zia Cooke	1845	2019–20 2020–21 2021–22 2022–23
9	Schonna Banner	1791	1986–87 1987–88 1988–89 1989–90
10	Martha Parker	1728	1985–86 1986–87 1987–88 1988–89

Season
Rank	Player	Points	Season
1	Joyce Edwards	768	2025–26
2	Katrina Anderson	754	1977–78
3	Beth Hunt	748	1989–90
4	A'ja Wilson	747	2017–18
5	Jocelyn Penn	716	2002–03
6	Katrina Anderson	700	1978–79
7	Shannon Johnson	691	1995–96
8	Shannon Johnson	646	1994–95
9	Shannon Johnson	634	1993–94
10	Sheila Foster	627	1981–82

Single game
Rank	Player	Points	Season	Opponent
1	Jocelyn Penn	51	2002–03	Stetson
2	Jocelyn Penn	50	2002–03	Wofford
	Shannon Johnson	50	1995–96	Appalachian State
4	Jocelyn Penn	45	2002–03	College of Charleston
5	Shannon Johnson	44	1994–95	Appalachian State
6	Shannon Johnson	42	1993–94	East Tennessee State
7	Katrina Anderson	41	1977–78	Florida State
8	Sharon Gilmore	40	1982–83	Florida International
9	Shannon Johnson	39	1995–96	Arizona State
	Denise Nanney	39	1975–76	Francis Marion

== Three-pointers ==
Career
Rank	Player	3FG	Seasons
1	Karen Middleton	317	1987–88 1988–89 1989–90 1990–91
2	Christi Timmons	239	1991–92 1992–93 1993–94 1994–95
3	Kelly Morrone	238	1999–2000 2001–02 2002–03 2003–04
4	Shannon Johnson	208	1992–93 1993–94 1994–95 1995–96
5	Zia Cooke	196	2019–20 2020–21 2021–22 2022–23
6	Tiffany Mitchell	180	2012–13 2013–14 2014–15 2015–16
7	Tessa Johnson	171	2023–24 2024–25 2025–26
8	Tina Roy	164	2011–12 2013–14 2014–15 2015–16
9	Heather Godfrey	159	1994–95 1995–96 1996–97 1997–98
10	Destanni Henderson	157	2018–19 2019–20 2020–21 2021–22

Season
Rank	Player	3FG	Season
1	Karen Middleton	115	1990–91
2	Jordan Jones	97	2007–08
3	Tessa Johnson	90	2025–26
4	Te-Hina Paopao	87	2023–24
5	Christi Timmons	84	1991–92
6	Valerie Nainima	82	2009–10
	Shannon Johnson	82	1995–96
8	Kelly Morrone	81	2003–04
9	Christi Timmons	79	1993–94
10	Karen Middleton	76	1987–88

Single game
Rank	Player	3FG	Season	Opponent
1	Jordan Jones	9	2007–08	NC A&T
	Shannon Johnson	9	1995–96	Arizona State
3	Kelly Morrone	8	2001–02	Duke
	Karen Middleton	8	1990–91	Tulane
	Karen Middleton	8	1990–91	Auburn
	Karen Middleton	8	1987–88	Memphis
7	Tina Roy	7	2015–16	Arkansas
	Markeshia Grant	7	2011–12	Tennessee
	Jordan Jones	7	2007–08	NC State
	Kelly Morrone	7	2003–04	Mississippi
	Cristina Ciocan	7	2003–04	Charlotte
	Kelly Morrone	7	2003–04	Mercer
	Tatyana Troina	7	2000–01	Florida
	Heather Godfrey	7	1997–98	UTEP
	Shannon Johnson	7	1994–95	Appalachian State
	Christi Timmons	7	1993–94	Florida
	Christi Timmons	7	1993–94	Arkansas
	Karen Middleton	7	1990–91	Memphis
	Karen Middleton	7	1988–89	Memphis
	Karen Middleton	7	1987–88	Tennessee

== Rebounds ==
Career
Rank	Player	Rebounds	Seasons
1	Aliyah Boston	1493	2019–20 2020–21 2021–22 2022–23
2	Sheila Foster	1427	1978–79 1979–80 1980–81 1981–82
3	Alaina Coates	1230	2013–14 2014–15 2015–16 2016–17
4	A'ja Wilson	1195	2014–15 2015–16 2016–17 2017–18
5	Marsha Williams	1026	1989–90 1990–91 1991–92 1992–93
6	Aleighsa Welch	956	2011–12 2012–13 2013–14 2014–15
7	Schonna Banner	901	1986–87 1987–88 1988–89 1989–90
8	Sharon Gilmore	882	1982–83 1983–84 1984–85 1985–86
9	Denise Nanney	877	1974–75 1975–76 1976–77
10	Brantley Southers	862	1981–82 1982–83 1983–84 1984–85 1985–86

Season
Rank	Player	Rebounds	Season
1	Aliyah Boston	462	2021–22
2	Katrina Anderson	434	1977–78
3	Madina Okot	412	2025–26
4	A'ja Wilson	391	2017–18
5	Sheila Foster	381	1980–81
6	Sheila Foster	379	1979–80
7	Katrina Anderson	371	1978–79
8	Aliyah Boston	364	2022–23
9	Denise Nanney	361	1974–75
10	Alaina Coates	360	2015–16

Single game
Rank	Player	Rebounds	Season	Opponent
1	Demetress Adams	26	2007–08	Arkansas
2	Aliyah Boston	25	2019–20	Arkansas
3	A'ja Wilson	24	2017–18	LSU
	Denise Nanney	24	1974–75	Anderson
5	Denise Nanney	23	1974–75	Davidson
6	Aliyah Boston	22	2021–22	North Carolina
	Sheila Foster	22	1980–81	Clemson
	Sheila Foster	22	1980–81	UCLA
	Katrina Anderson	22	1977–78	East Carolina
	Katrina Anderson	22	1977–78	Claflin
	Denise Nanney	22	1974–75	UNC-Greensboro

== Assists ==
Career
Rank	Player	Assists	Seasons
1	Tyasha Harris	702	2016–17 2017–18 2018–19 2019–20
2	Cristina Ciocan	615	2000–01 2001–02 2002–03 2003–04
3	Raven Johnson	612	2021–22 2022–23 2023–24 2024–25 2025-26
4	Mindy Ballou	595	1982–83 1983–84 1984–85 1985–86
5	Martha Parker	543	1985–86 1986–87 1987–88 1988–89
6	Sharon Rivers	512	1979–80 1980–81 1981–82 1982–83
7	Lisa Diaz	498	1986–87 1987–88 1988–89 1989–90
8	Shannon Johnson	467	1992–93 1993–94 1994–95 1995–96
9	Sherry David	424	1987–88 1988–89 1989–90 1990–91
10	Destanni Henderson	423	2018–19 2019–20 2020–21 2021–22

Season
Rank	Player	Assists	Season
1	Tyasha Harris	220	2017–18
2	Mindy Ballou	219	1983–84
3	Cristina Ciocan	207	2002–03
4	Raven Johnson	202	2025-26
5	Sharon Rivers	190	1981–82
6	Tyasha Harris	189	2019–20
7	Cristina Ciocan	185	2001–02
8	Raven Johnson	179	2023–24
9	Tyasha Harris	176	2018–19
10	Lisa Diaz	174	1988–89
	Mindy Ballou	174	1985–86

Single game
Rank	Player	Assists	Season	Opponent
1	Cristina Ciocan	18	2003–04	Florida A&M
2	Raven Johnson	17	2023–24	Clemson
3	Tyasha Harris	14	2018–19	Tennessee
	Cristina Ciocan	14	2001–02	Vanderbilt
	Mindy Ballou	14	1985–86	Clemson
	Martha Parker	14	1985–86	Charlotte
	Mindy Ballou	14	1983–84	Cincinnati
	Cheryl Autry	14	1978–79	Clemson

== Steals ==
Career
Rank	Player	Steals	Seasons
1	Jocelyn Penn	359	1998–99 1999–2000 2001–02 2002–03
2	Rita Johnson	298	1977–78 1978–79 1979–80 1980–81
3	Martha Parker	284	1985–86 1986–87 1987–88 1988–89
4	Shannon Johnson	260	1992–93 1993–94 1994–95 1995–96
5	Ieasia Walker	258	2009–10 2010–11 2011–12 2012–13
6	Sheila Foster	250	1978–79 1979–80 1980–81 1981–82
7	Tiffany Mitchell	234	2012–13 2013–14 2014–15 2015–16
8	Raven Johnson	232	2021–22 2022–23 2023–24 2024–25 2025-26
9	Cristina Ciocan	227	2000–01 2001–02 2002–03 2003–04
10	Tyasha Harris	224	2016–17 2017–18 2018–19 2019–20

Season
Rank	Player	Steals	Season
1	Katrina Anderson	126	1978–79
2	Jocelyn Penn	112	2002–03
3	Jocelyn Penn	94	2001–02
4	Ieasia Walker	90	2012–13
5	Rita Johnson	89	1979–80
6	Rita Johnson	88	1980–81
	Sheila Foster	88	1979–80
8	Cheryl Autry	80	1978–79
9	Tyasha Harris	79	2017–18
	Jocelyn Penn	79	1998–99
	Ieasia Walker	79	2010–11

Single game
Rank	Player	Steals	Season	Opponent
1	Jocelyn Penn	11	1998–99	South Carolina State
2	Cristina Ciocan	9	2002–03	Middle Tennessee
	Jocelyn Penn	9	2001–02	Georgia
	Jocelyn Penn	9	1999–2000	Coastal Carolina
	Christi Timmons	9	1993–94	Michigan
	Pam Adams	9	1977–78	Georgia Southern
7	Lauren Simms	8	2003–04	Tennessee
	Jocelyn Penn	8	2002–03	Kentucky
	Cristina Ciocan	8	2001–02	Mississippi State
	Shannon Johnson	8	1993–94	Georgia Southern
	Rita Johnson	8	1980–81	SMU
	Rita Johnson	8	1978–79	Kentucky
	Sharon Rivers	8	1981–82	George State

== Blocks ==
Career
Rank	Player	Blocks	Seasons
1	A'ja Wilson	363	2014–15 2015–16 2016–17 2017–18
2	Aliyah Boston	330	2019–20 2020–21 2021–22 2022–23
3	Mikiah Herbert Harrigan	210	2016–17 2017–18 2018–19 2019–20
	Alaina Coates	210	2013–14 2014–15 2015–16 2016–17
5	Kamilla Cardoso	198	2021–22 2022–23 2023–24
6	Victaria Saxton	192	2018–19 2019–20 2020–21 2021–22 2022–23
7	Lakesha Tolliver	177	2003–04 2004–05 2005–06 2006–07
8	Elem Ibiam	164	2011–12 2012–13 2013–14 2014–15
9	Michelle Murray	148	1989–90 1990–91 1991–92 1992–93
10	Petra Ujhelyi	143	1999–2000 2000–01 2001–02 2002–03

Season
Rank	Player	Blocks	Season
1	A'ja Wilson	105	2017–18
2	A'ja Wilson	103	2015–16
3	Ashlyn Watkins	91	2023–24
4	Aliyah Boston	90	2021–22
	A'ja Wilson	90	2016–17
6	Aliyah Boston	86	2019–20
7	Elem Ibiam	83	2013–14
8	Kamilla Cardoso	82	2023–24
9	Aliyah Boston	81	2020–21
10	Aliyah Boston	73	2022–23
	Alaina Coates	73	2013–14

Single game
Rank	Player	Blocks	Season	Opponent
1	Aliyah Boston	10	2020–21	Georgia
	Aliyah Boston	10	2019–20	Alabama State
	Alaina Coates	10	2015–16	Winthrop
4	Laeticia Amihere	9	2020–21	Texas
	A'ja Wilson	8	2017–18	Temple
	A'ja Wilson	8	2015–16	Texas A&M
	A'ja Wilson	8	2015–16	Kentucky
	Jean Walling	8	1977–78	South Carolina State
9	Kamilla Cardoso	7	2023–24	Presbyterian
	Aliyah Boston	7	2021–22	Maryland
	Aliyah Boston	7	2020–21	Kentucky
	Aliyah Boston	7	2019–20	Arkansas
	A'ja Wilson	7	2017–18	Arkansas
	A'ja Wilson	7	2016–17	Georgia
	Elem Ibiam	7	2013–14	Mississippi State
	Lakesha Tolliver	7	2006–07	UNC Wilmington
