= Illinois Miss Basketball =

The Illinois Miss Basketball honor recognizes the top high school basketball player in the state of Illinois.

== Award winners ==
Year	Player	High School	College	Professional basketball
2025	Destiny Jackson	Whitney Young	Illinois	
2024	Kloe Froebe	Lincoln	Colorado State	
2023	Lenée Beaumont	Benet Academy	Indiana	
2022	Sophie Swanson	Barrington	Purdue	
2021	N/A			
2020	Angela Dugalić	Maine West	Oregon/UCLA	
2019	Brea Beal (3)	Rock Island	South Carolina	2023 WNBA draft 2nd round, 24th overall pick, Minnesota Lynx
2018	Brea Beal (2)	Rock Island	South Carolina	2023 WNBA draft 2nd round, 24th overall pick, Minnesota Lynx
2017	Brea Beal	Rock Island	South Carolina	2023 WNBA draft 2nd round, 24th overall pick, Minnesota Lynx
2016	Kathleen Doyle	Benet Academy	Iowa	2020 WNBA draft 2nd round, 14th overall pick, Indiana Fever
2015	Haley Gorecki	Fremd	Duke	2020 WNBA draft 3rd round, 31st overall pick, Seattle Storm
2014	Tyra Buss (2)	Mt. Carmel	Indiana	
2013	Tyra Buss	Mt. Carmel	Indiana	
2012	Morgan Tuck (2)	Bolingbrook	Connecticut	2016 WNBA draft 1st round, 3rd overall pick, Connecticut Sun
2011	Ariel Massengale	Bolingbrook	Tennessee	2015 WNBA draft 3rd round, 29th overall pick, Atlanta Dream
2010	Tricia Liston	Fenwick	Duke	2014 WNBA draft 1st round, 12th overall pick, Minnesota Lynx
2009	Morgan Tuck	Bolingbrook	Connecticut	2016 WNBA draft 1st round, 3rd overall pick, Connecticut Sun
2008	Sarah Boothe	Warren	Stanford	
2007	Brittany Johnson	Olney East Richland	Ohio State	
2006	Theresa Lisch	Althoff	St. Louis	
2005	Lindsay Schrader	Bartlett	Notre Dame	
2004	Candace Parker (3)	Naperville Central	Tennessee	2008 WNBA draft 1st round, 1st overall pick, Los Angeles Sparks
2003	Candace Parker (2)	Naperville Central	Tennessee	2008 WNBA draft 1st round, 1st overall pick, Los Angeles Sparks
2002	Candace Parker	Naperville Central	Tennessee	2008 WNBA draft 1st round, 1st overall pick, Los Angeles Sparks
2001	Cappie Pondexter (2)	Marshall	Rutgers	2006 WNBA draft 1st round, 2nd overall pick, Phoenix Mercury
2000	Cappie Pondexter	Marshall	Rutgers	2006 WNBA draft 1st round, 2nd overall pick, Phoenix Mercury
1999	Molly McDowell	Nokomis	Southern Illinois	
1998	Allison Curtin	Taylorville	Illinois/Tulsa	2003 WNBA draft 1st round, 12th overall pick, Houston Comets
1997	Courtney Smith	Carlyle	Southern Illinois	
1996	Tauja Catchings	Stevenson	Illinois	
1995	Tamika Catchings	Stevenson	Tennessee	2001 WNBA draft 1st round, 3rd overall pick, Indiana Fever
1994	Michelle Hasheider	Okawville	Colorado	
1993	Kim Williams	Marshall	DePaul/Arkansas-Fort Smith	1997 WNBA draft 4th round, 28th overall pick, Utah Starzz
1992	Tammy Van Oppen	Limestone	South Florida	
1991	Megan Lucid	Mother McAuley	DePaul	
1990	Courtney Porter	Hume Shiloh	Illinois State	
1989	LaTonia Foster	Marshall	Iowa	
1988	Nancy Kennelly	Maine West	Northwestern	
1987	Cindy Kaufman	Seneca	Illinois State	
1986	Doris Carie	Teutopolis	Illinois	

== See also ==
- Mr. Illinois Basketball
