= Allison Curtin =

American basketball player

Personal information
- Born: March 31, 1980 (age 46) Taylorville, Illinois, U.S.
- Listed height: 5 ft 11 in (1.80 m)
- Listed weight: 151 lb (68 kg)

Career information
- High school: Taylorville (Taylorville, Illinois)
- College: Illinois (1998–2001); Tulsa (2002–2003)
- WNBA draft: 2003: 1st round, 12th overall pick
- Drafted by: Houston Comets
- Position: Guard
- Number: 13

Career highlights
- First-team All-WAC (2003); WAC All-Freshman Team (2003); 2× First-team All-Big Ten (2000, 2001); Illinois Miss Basketball (1998)
- Stats at Basketball Reference
- Stats at Basketball Reference

Allison Diane Curtin (born March 31, 1980) is an American former basketball player who was drafted with the twelfth pick in the 2003 WNBA draft.

== Illinois statistics ==
Legend
GP	Games played	GS	Games started	MPG	Minutes per game
FG%	Field goal percentage	3P%	3-point field goal percentage	FT%	Free throw percentage
RPG	Rebounds per game	APG	Assists per game	SPG	Steals per game
BPG	Blocks per game	PPG	Points per game	**Bold**	Career high

Year	Team	GP	Points	FG%	3P%	FT%	RPG	APG	SPG	BPG	PPG
1998–99	Illinois	31	399	44.7%	38.9%	82.6%	4.0	2.4	0.3	0.3	12.9
1999-00	Illinois	**34**	599	**46.9%**	**41.2%**	82.1%	5.7	2.8	2.6	0.4	17.6
2000–01	Illinois	33	530	46.3%	40.4%	77.1%	5.7	4.3	3.1	0.1	16.1
2002–03	Tulsa	30	**692**	44.8%	38.4%	**84.1%**	**7.6**	**4.6**	**3.2**	**0.7**	**23.1**
Career		128	2220	45.7%	39.6%	82.0%	5.7	3.5	2.3	0.4	17.3

== Personal life ==
Curtin has four brothers and four sisters. In high school she also participated in track and cross country. In 1998 she was named Illinois Ms. Basketball.
