= The Freshies (basketball) =

Women's basketball recruiting class

The Freshies

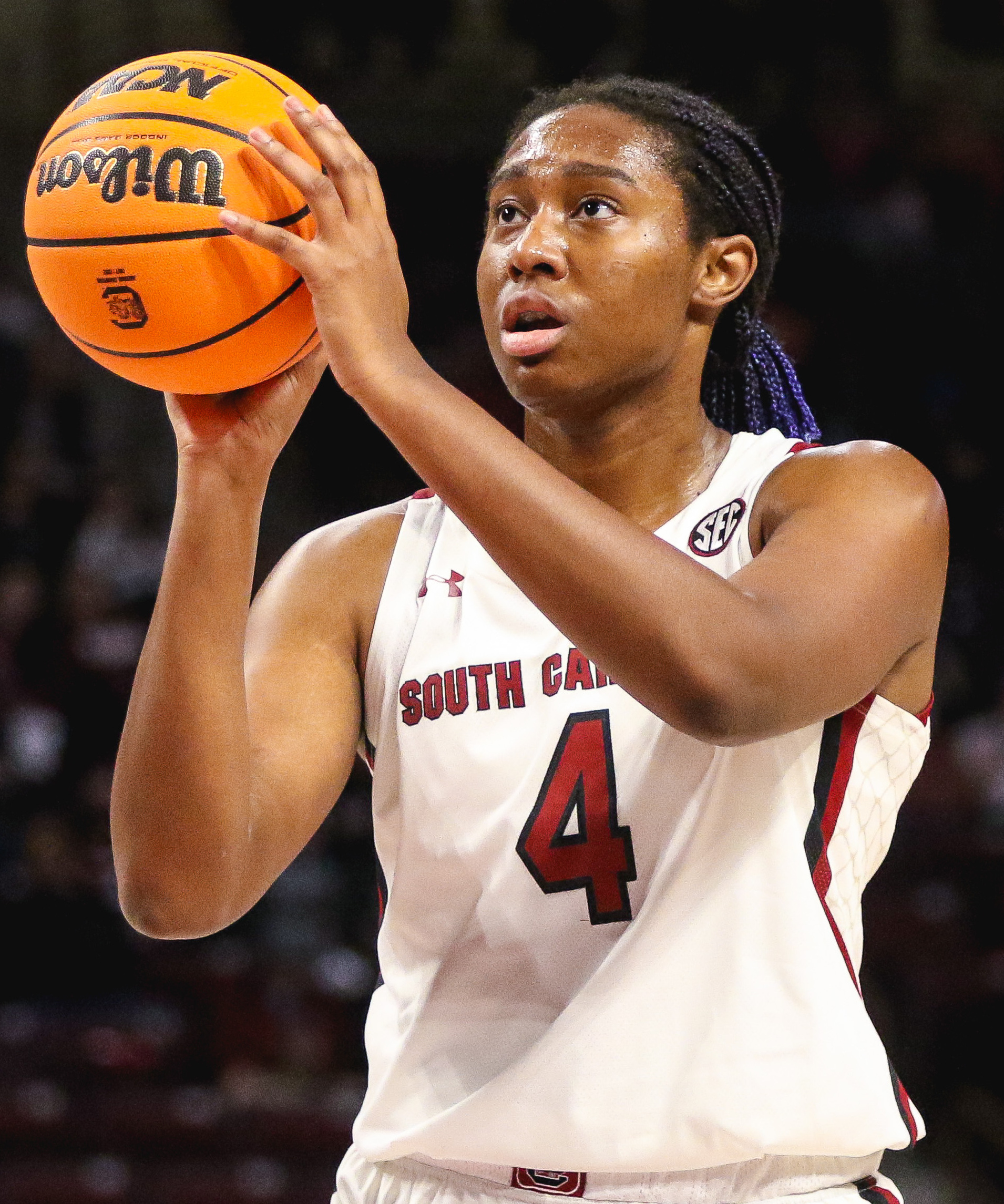
Aliyah Boston

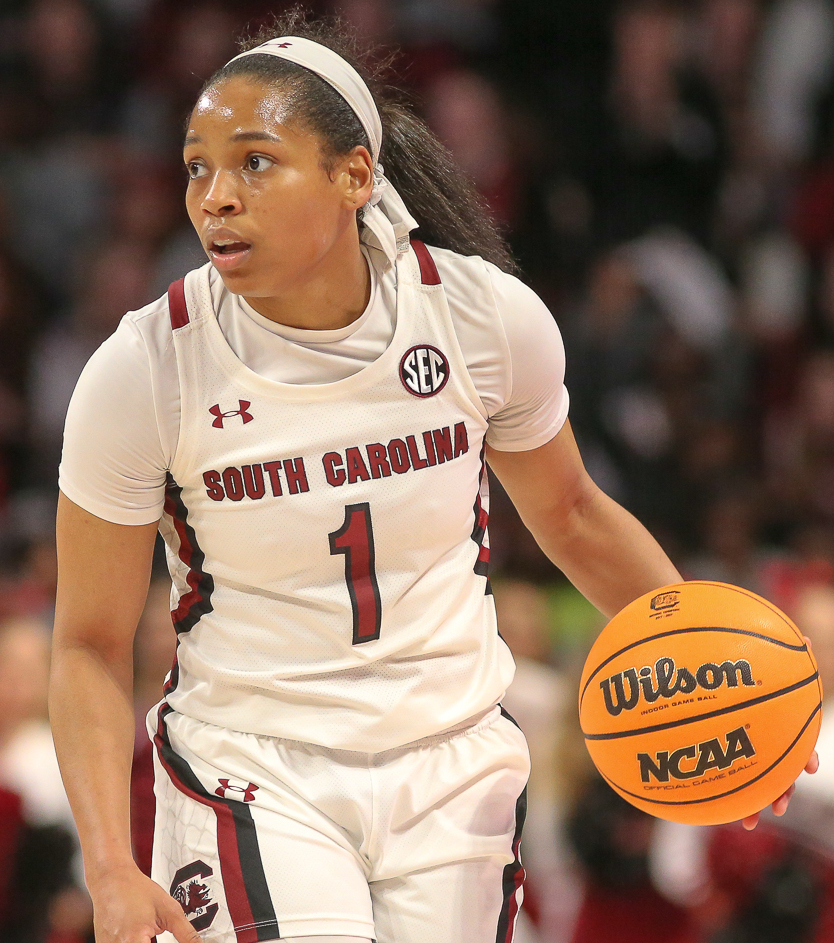
Zia Cooke

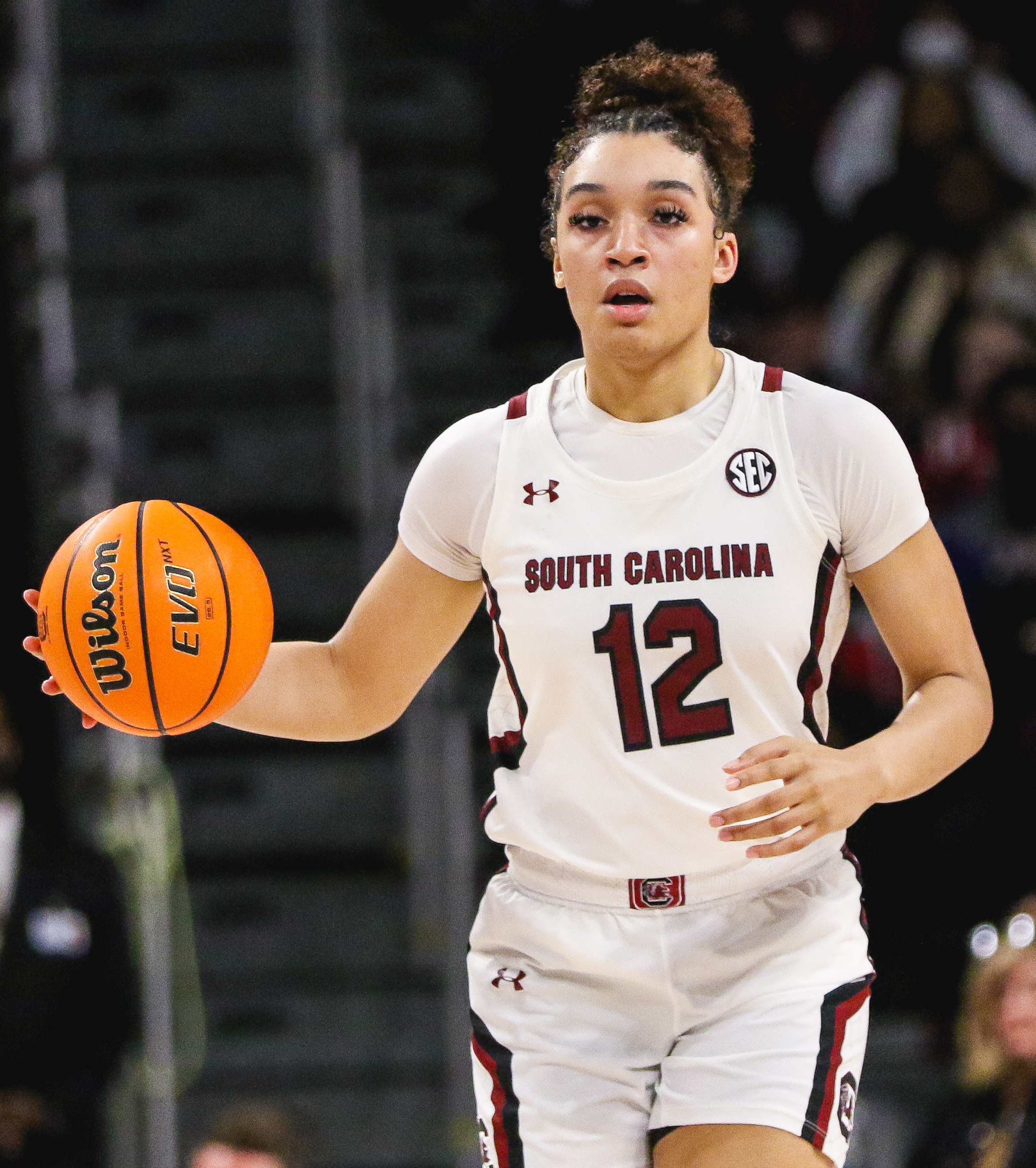
Brea Beal

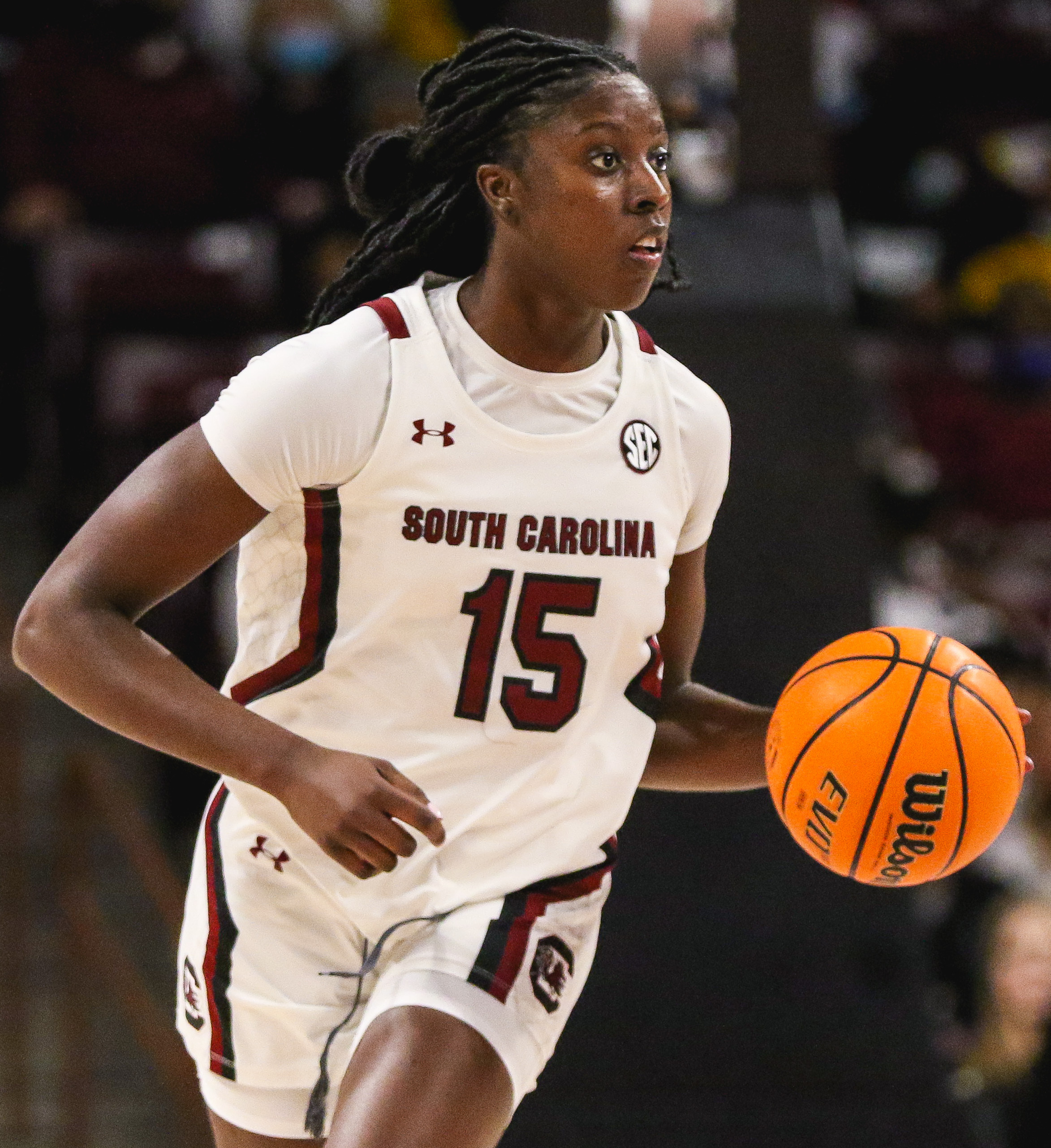
Laeticia Amihere

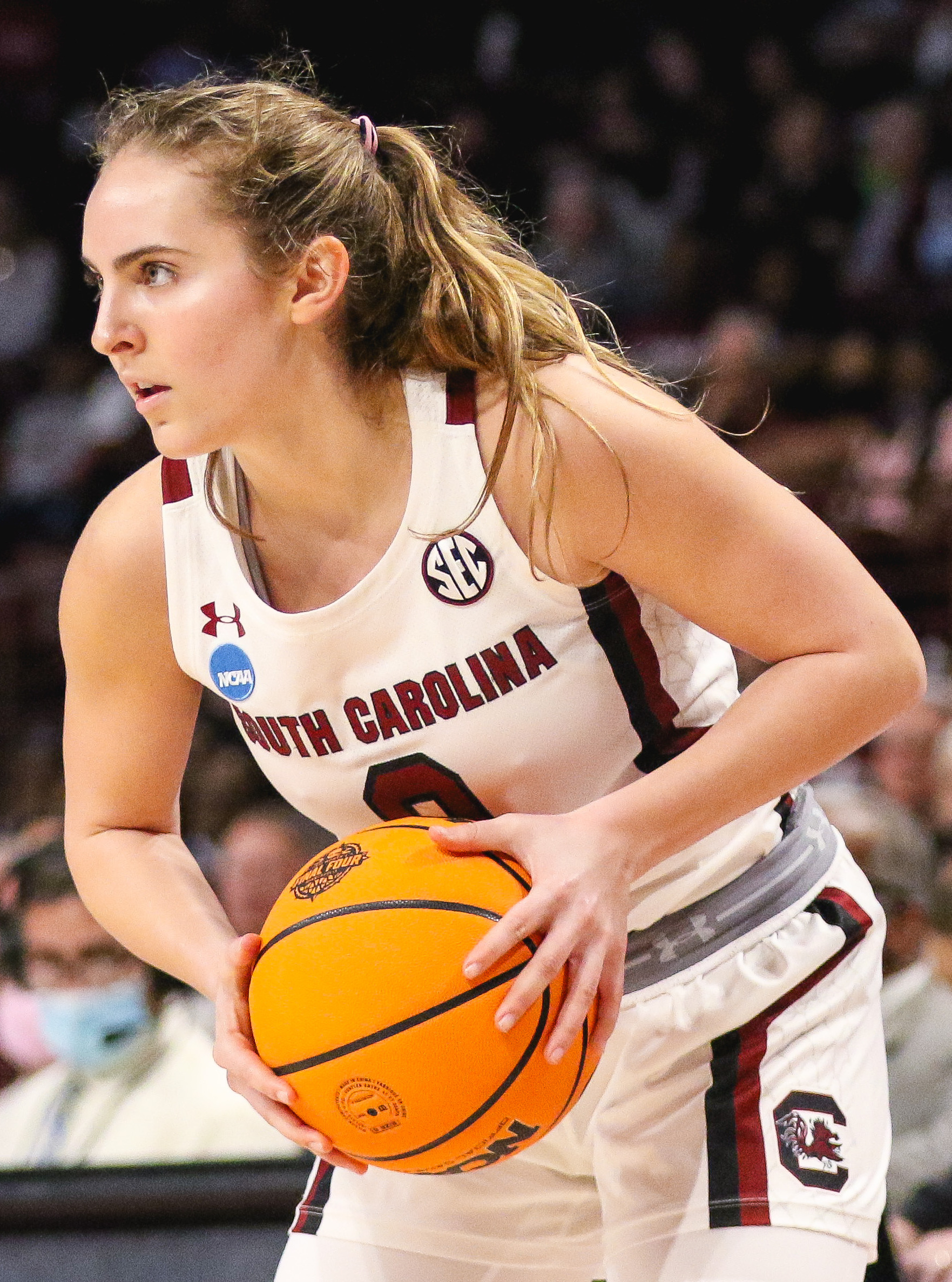
Olivia Thompson

The Freshies were the 2019 recruiting class of the South Carolina Gamecocks women's basketball program. They were the number one recruiting class of the 2019–20 NCAA Division I season and played together until 2023. Developed under head coach Dawn Staley, they helped South Carolina win the 2022 national championship and reach the Final Four in all three NCAA tournaments they competed in. The class also won four Southeastern Conference (SEC) regular season titles and three SEC tournament titles, finishing with a 129–9 record over four years.

The Freshies were led by forward Aliyah Boston, who was named national player of the year and NCAA tournament Most Outstanding Player as a junior in 2021–22. Boston, with guards Zia Cooke and Brea Beal, started for South Carolina since their freshman season in 2019–20. Forward Laeticia Amihere was a key bench player and guard Olivia Thompson was a former walk-on who received limited playing time.

Considered one of the most accomplished recruiting classes in women's college basketball history, the Freshies helped transform South Carolina into the most dominant team in the nation. After four years, none of its members opted to return for a fifth season of eligibility. In the 2023 WNBA draft, Boston was the first overall pick, and Cooke, Beal and Amihere were selected later in the draft.

== Background ==
After the departure of star player A'ja Wilson in the previous season, South Carolina entered a rebuilding stage under head coach Dawn Staley in the 2018–19 season. The team finished the season with a 23–10 record and lost in the Sweet 16 of the 2019 NCAA tournament, and its team culture came under scrutiny. Entering the 2019–20 season, they lost several key players from the 2018–19 team, including top scorer Te'a Cooper. In August 2018, guard Olivia Thompson became the first member of the 2019 South Carolina recruiting class after accepting a walk-on offer. In November, the Gamecocks received commitments from four top recruits in the 2019 class: guards Zia Cooke and Brea Beal, and forwards Laeticia Amihere and Aliyah Boston. All four were ranked top-11 in their class by ESPN at the end of their high school careers. They were the number one recruiting class in the nation and one of the best in history. Boston, Cooke and Beal were named McDonald's All-Americans, and only Stanford had as many players receive the honor. After all members of the class signed with South Carolina, they created a group chat named "The Freshies" due to their freshman status. They kept the nickname after their freshman year.

== Career ==
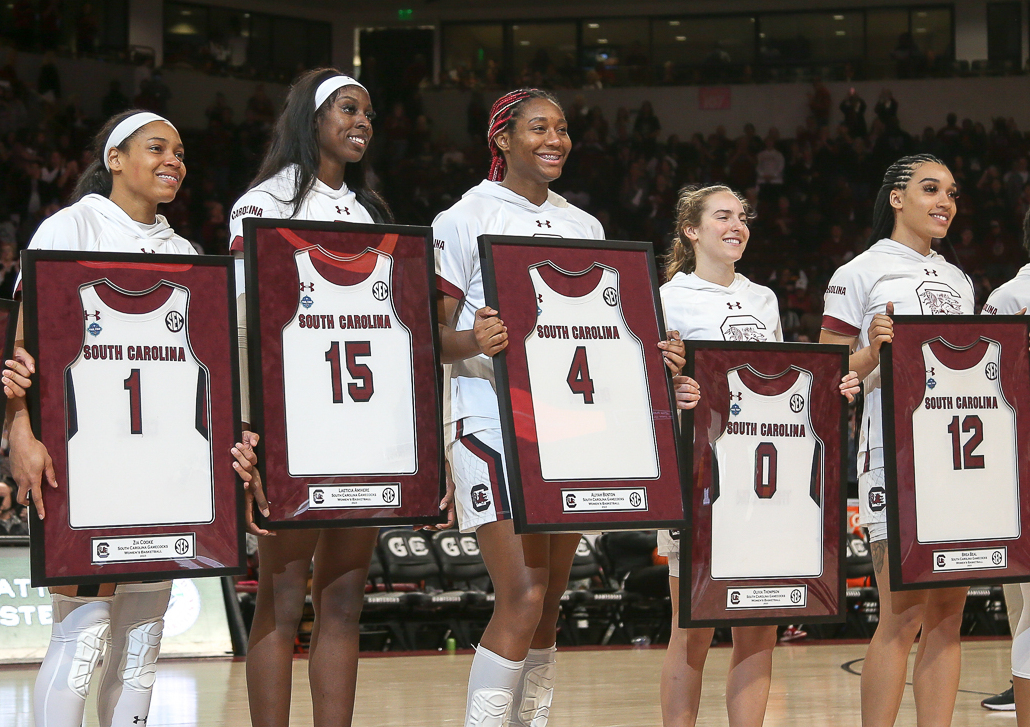
The Freshies at their final home regular season game in 2023

As freshmen in 2019–20, Boston, Cooke and Beal immediately entered the starting lineup for South Carolina. Boston assumed a leading role, standing out as a rebounder and defender. Cooke was one of the team's primary scorers, while Beal served as a defensive specialist, often guarding the opponents' best player. Amihere came off the bench and was recovering from knee injuries from high school in her first season. Thompson had a limited role but remained a fan favorite, as a Lexington, South Carolina native who had grown up supporting the Gamecocks, and earned a scholarship before her sophomore year. They achieved a 32–1 record and finished as the AP No. 1 team for the first time in program history, while winning SEC regular season and tournament titles and going undefeated in conference play. The 2020 NCAA tournament was canceled because of the COVID-19 pandemic, and the team was effectively named mythical national champions through the football-style polls. On December 31, 2020, before the start of the conference season, which the team raised a championship banner at Colonial Life Arena next to the 2017 championship for what effectively was a newspaper decision. In the 2020–21 season, South Carolina won the SEC tournament. They reached the Final Four of the 2021 NCAA tournament and finished with a 26–5 record.

The Freshies helped acclimate South Carolina's top-ranked 2021 recruiting class, nicknamed "The Birdies", which included Raven Johnson, Sania Feagin and Bree Hall. The 2021–22 team won the SEC regular season title and were ranked No. 1 in the AP Poll for the entire season, with a 34–2 record. They won the program's second national championship, and Boston was named national player of the year and NCAA tournament Most Outstanding Player. The 2022 banner was located next to the 2020 banner. In the 2022–23 season, the Freshies led South Carolina to its first undefeated regular season, as well as SEC regular season and tournament titles and its third consecutive Final Four. They were the wire-to-wire AP No. 1 team for a second straight season and achieved a 36–1 record.

== Aftermath ==
The Freshies led South Carolina to a 129–9 record, including 60–1 at home, over four years. Jeremiah Holloway of The State described the Freshies as one of the most accomplished recruiting classes in women's college basketball history, crediting them with South Carolina's dominance from 2019 to 2023. Head coach Dawn Staley credits them with improving the culture of the program.

Following their senior season, all members of the Freshies opted to end their college careers, despite having a fifth season of eligibility granted due to the COVID-19 pandemic. In the 2023 WNBA draft, Boston was selected first overall by the Indiana Fever, Amihere was the eighth pick to the Atlanta Dream and Cooke was the 10th pick to the Los Angeles Sparks. It was the first time that three seniors from the same team were selected in the first round since Notre Dame in 2019. Beal was chosen by the Minnesota Lynx with the 24th pick.
