= Olivia Thompson =

Olivia Thompson may refer to:

- Olivia Levicki (née Thompson), Australian basketball player
- Olivia Thompson, American basketball player and member of The Freshies
