= Karen Middleton (basketball) =

American basketball coach

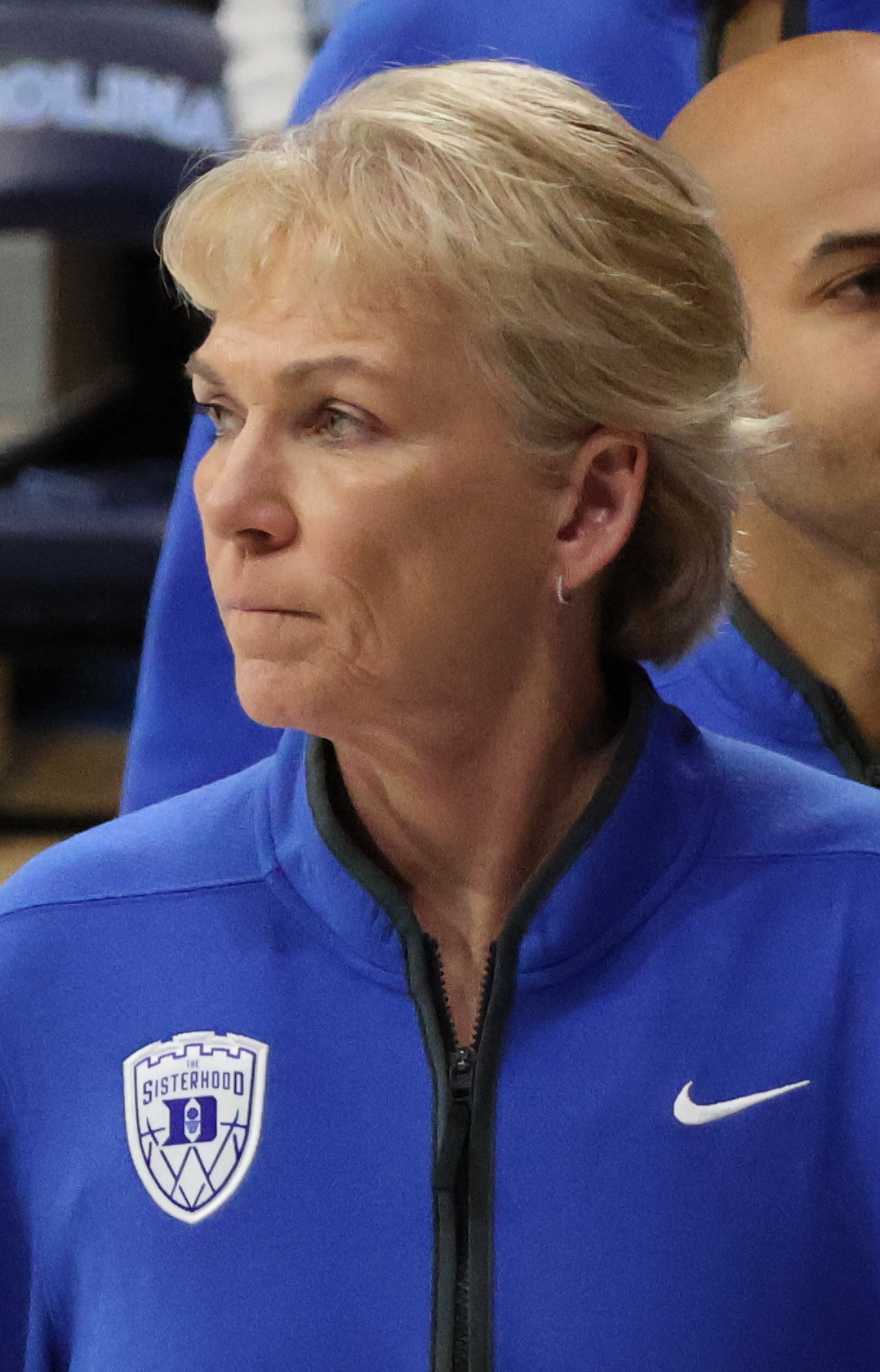
- Middleton with Duke in 2025

Current position
- Title: Assistant Coach
- Team: Duke
- Conference: ACC

Biographical details
- Born: Monroe, North Carolina

Playing career
- 1987–1991: South Carolina

Coaching career (HC unless noted)
- 1991–1994: South Carolina (asst.)
- 1994–1997: Eastern Washington (asst.)
- 1997–2007: Stanford (asst.)
- 2007–2009: Illinois (asst.)
- 2009–2015: Western Carolina
- 2015–2016: Cal State Fullerton (Associate HC)
- 2016–2023: Wisconsin–La Crosse
- 2023–present: Duke (asst.)

Head coaching record
- Overall: 174–184 (.486)
- Tournaments: 0–1 (NCAA D3)

Karen Middleton is an American basketball coach who is currently an assistant coach for the Duke Blue Devils women's basketball team.

On June 21, 2016, she became the 15th head coach of the University of Wisconsin–La Crosse Women's Basketball team.

Prior to her hiring at the University of Wisconsin, La Crosse, she spent one year as an Associate Head Coach at California State University, Fullerton.

On May 15, 2009, she became the 10th head coach of Western Carolina University Women's Basketball, succeeding Kelly Harper, who was named head coach at NC State University.

Prior to her appointment to Western Carolina, she spent two years as an assistant coach at Illinois.

== Playing career ==
Middleton attended the University of South Carolina and was a four-year letter winner. She was a team captain, team MVP and a two-time All-Metro Conference selection and finished her career as the fifth-leading scorer in school history with 1,714 points.

Middleton became the best shooter in USC history and holds school records for career 3FG made (317), career 3FG percentage (44.5), season 3FG made (115) and season 3FG percentage (46.9). Middleton led her team to four NCAA Tournaments (including a Sweet 16 appearance), and was selected twice as GTE Academic All-District.

Born in Monroe, N.C., she graduated from McBee High School in McBee, S.C., and was the SC player of the year twice (1986 and '87).

=== South Carolina statistics ===
Legend
GP	Games played	GS	Games started	MPG	Minutes per game
FG%	Field goal percentage	3P%	3-point field goal percentage	FT%	Free throw percentage
RPG	Rebounds per game	APG	Assists per game	SPG	Steals per game
BPG	Blocks per game	PPG	Points per game	**Bold**	Career high

Year	Team	GP	Points	FG%	3P%	FT%	RPG	APG	SPG	BPG	PPG
1987–88	South Carolina	**34**	408	42.4%	43.4%	70.4%	2.4	2.7	0.7	0.1	12.0
1988–89	South Carolina	30	325	46.3%	45.5%	63.2%	2.3	3.0	1.1	**0.2**	10.8
1989–90	South Carolina	33	437	**49.8%**	**46.9%**	71.4%	4.5	3.2	1.3	0.1	13.2
1990–91	South Carolina	31	**544**	42.8%	43.4%	**82.1%**	**4.7**	**3.9**	**1.7**	0.0	**17.5**
Career	South Carolina	128	1714	45.0%	44.5%	74.7%	3.5	3.2	1.2	0.1	13.4

== Head coaching record ==
Record table
Season	Team	Overall	Conference	Standing	Postseason
Western Carolina Catamounts (Southern Conference) (2009–2015)
2009–10	Western Carolina	7–23	6–14	T–7th	
2010–11	Western Carolina	9–22	6–14	10th	
2011–12	Western Carolina	14–17	8–12	7th	
2012–13	Western Carolina	7–23	5–15	9th	
2013–14	Western Carolina	15–17	7–11	T–7th	
2014–15	Western Carolina	11–19	3–11	T–6th	
Western Carolina:		63–121 (.342)	35–77 (.313)		
Wisconsin-La Crosse Eagles (WIAC) (2016–2023)
2016–17	Wisconsin-La Crosse	16–11	9–5	T–3rd	
2017–18	Wisconsin-La Crosse	16–10	9–5	T–2nd	
2018–19	Wisconsin-La Crosse	22–4	10–4	T–2nd	
2019–20	Wisconsin-La Crosse	19–8	10–4	T–2nd	NCAA Division III First Round
2020–21	Wisconsin-La Crosse	5–5	4–4	4th	
2021–22	Wisconsin-La Crosse	14–12	5–8	5th	
2022–23	Wisconsin-La Crosse	19–7	8–6	T–4th	
Wisconsin-La Crosse:		111–57 (.661)	55–36 (.604)		
Total:		174–184 (.486)			
National champion Postseason invitational champion Conference regular season champion Conference regular season and conference tournament champion Division regular season champion Division regular season and conference tournament champion Conference tournament champion

== Academic ==
In 1991, Middleton graduated cum laude with a BA, and also earned an Interdisciplinary Master of Arts in Physical Education in 1993, both from South Carolina.
