= Nancy Wilson (basketball) =

Former professional and college basketball coach

Biographical details
- Born: October 18, 1951 (age 74); Lake City, South Carolina, U.S.

Playing career
- 1969–1973: Coker University

Coaching career (HC unless noted)
- 1973–1976: College of Charleston (asst.)
- 1976–1984: College of Charleston
- 1984–1997: South Carolina
- 1997–1998: Seattle Reign (assoc.)
- 2003–2012: College of Charleston

Head coaching record
- Overall: Division I, 349–301 (.537); Division II, 193–64 (.751)

Accomplishments and honors

Championships
- 5x Metro Conference regular season (1986, 1988–1991); 3x Metro Conference tournament (1986, 1988, 1989)

Awards
- 2x Metro Conference Coach of the Year (1985, 1991); AIAW National Coach of the Year (1982); 3x SCAIAW Coach of the Year (1980–1982)

Nancy Wilson (born October 18, 1951) is a former professional and college basketball coach. She coached the College of Charleston women's basketball (CofC), the University of South Carolina women's basketball (USC), and the professional Seattle Reign of the American Basketball League (ABL). Wilson would establish the program records for the most wins as a head coach at both the College of Charleston and South Carolina, and still owns the career wins totals at CofC. Wilson led both programs to numerous conference championships as well as AIAW and NCAA tournament appearances. Wilson has spent 30 years as a college head coach, compiling a record of 542–365

== Early years ==
Born in Lake City, South Carolina, Wilson attended Lake City High School, graduating in 1969. She attended Coker College in Hartsville, S. C., graduating in 1973 with a bachelor's degree in Physical Education. She was a member of the college's first intercollegiate women's basketball team, and also competed in intercollegiate field hockey. She would later obtain her master's degree in Physical Education from The Citadel in 1982.

== College of Charleston (first stint) ==
Soon after graduating from Coker College, Wilson was hired as an assistant coach for the College of Charleston women's basketball team in 1973. The team was then in the AIAW Division II. She worked for head coach Joan Cronan, and also coached the college's volleyball team. In 1976 Wilson succeeded Cronan as the head coach of the women's basketball program as Cronan focused more on her position as the Director of Women's Athletics.

Wilson led the Cougars to quick success, leading the team to a 21–5 record her first season as head coach, and beginning with the 1979–80 season reached the AIAW Division II national championship game three years in a row. During this eight-season period at College of Charleston Wilson compiled a 193–64 record. Wilson was named the SCAIAW Coach of the Year three times, and shared National Coach of the Year honors in 1982. The success led Wilson to be offered the job to coach South Carolina in 1984.

== University of South Carolina ==
Wilson spent 13 years as head coach at South Carolina beginning with the 1984–85 season. During the early years of Wilson's tenure when South Carolina was a member of the Metro Conference, Wilson built the program into a dominant presence within the conference, winning five regular season titles and three conference tournament championships. Wilson led the Gamecocks to five NCAA Tournament appearances, all during their Metro Conference years, including an appearance in the Sweet Sixteen in 1989–90. Wilson was named Metro Conference Coach of the Year in 1985 and 1991.

When South Carolina joined the more competitive Southeastern Conference beginning with the 1991–92 season however, the success was harder to come by. Still by her final season of 1996–97, Wilson held the program's all-time wins record with a 231–149 showing, that remained SC's record until passed by head coach Dawn Staley on December 21, 2017

== Seattle Reign ==
Wilson joined the American Basketball League's Seattle Reign as the associate head coach in 1997 under Tammy Holder, Wilson's former assistant coach at SC. The Reign went 15–29 in Wilson's first season on the staff. They began to realize substantial improvements during her 2nd season, but the league was struggling to compete against the new Women's National Basketball League (WNBA), and in a surprising move declared Chapter 11 bankruptcy in the middle of the following season, on December 22, 1998. The Reign were 8–7 at the time.

== College of Charleston (second stint) ==
After her time in the ABL, Wilson returned to South Carolina and took a job at the College of Charleston teaching physical education classes. While there she was persuaded in 2003 by a member of the administration to return as head coach of the women's basketball team, beginning with the 2003–04 season.

Success did not come as immediately nor as consistently for her second tour as it did for her first, as she compiled a 118–152 over nine seasons. She did however lead the program to its best season in Division I basketball in 2008–09, when the team set program single-season records with 14 conference wins in the Southern Conference, and with 23 wins overall. Further, College of Charleston won a school-record nine consecutive games that season, and advanced to its first-ever Southern Conference Tournament championship game.

2008–09 was also the season that Wilson became the 24th active Division I coach at the time in NCAA history to reach 500 career victories, with a 63–43 win over Georgia Southern on Feb. 16, 2009.

Wilson would lead CofC to another strong season in 2009–10 finishing 21–12 (13–7), but then the team would falter to 10–20 (7–13) and 7–23 (6–14) results in 2010–11 and 2011–12, respectively. Prior to the 2011–12 season, Wilson announced that she would be retiring from coaching at the conclusion of that season.

== Head coaching record ==
Record table
Season	Team	Overall	Conference	Standing	Postseason
College of Charleston (AIAW Division II) (1976–1984)
1976–77	Col. of Charleston	21–5			
1977–78	Col. of Charleston	20–12			
1978–79	Col. of Charleston	19–10			
1979–80	Col. of Charleston	32–8			AIAW Div. II Nationals Runner-up
1980–81	Col. of Charleston	25–9			AIAW Div. II Nationals Runner-up
1981–82	Col. of Charleston	30–7			AIAW Div. II Nationals Runner-up
1982–83	Col. of Charleston	23–6			NAIA District 6 Regionals
1983–84	Col. of Charleston	23–7			NAIA District 6 State Playoffs
College of Charleston (AIAW):		193–64 (.751)			
South Carolina (Metro Conference) (1984–1991)
1984–85	South Carolina	18–10	8–3	2nd	
1985–86	South Carolina	19–11	9–1	1st	NCAA First Round
1986–87	South Carolina	18–12	8–4	2nd	
1987–88	South Carolina	23–11	10–2	1st	NCAA Second Round
1988–89	South Carolina	23–7	10–2	T-1st	NCAA First Round
1989–90	South Carolina	24–9	13–1	1st	NCAA Sweet Sixteen
1990–91	South Carolina	22–9	12–2	T-1st	NCAA First Round
South Carolina (Metro):		147–69 (.681)	70–15 (.824)		
South Carolina (Southeastern Conference) (1991–1997)
1991–92	South Carolina	13–15	2–9	12th	
1992–93	South Carolina	17–10	5–6	7th	
1993–94	South Carolina	14–13	2–9	T-10th	
1994–95	South Carolina	12–15	1–10	T-10th	
1995–96	South Carolina	16–12	2–9	T-11th	
1996–97	South Carolina	12–15	1–11	T-11th	
South Carolina (SEC):		84–80 (.512)	13–54 (.194)		
South Carolina (Total):		231–149 (.608)	83–69 (.546)		
College of Charleston (Southern Conference) (2003–2012)
2003–04	Col. of Charleston	7–22	4–16	10th	
2004–05	Col. of Charleston	15–14	10–10	8th	
2005–06	Col. of Charleston	11–17	7–11	8th	
2006–07	Col. of Charleston	10–20	5–13	9th	
2007–08	Col. of Charleston	14–16	9–9	5th	
2008–09	Col. of Charleston	23–8	14–6	T-3rd	
2009–10	Col. of Charleston	21–12	13–7	4th	WBI Semifinals
2010–11	Col. of Charleston	10–20	7–13	9th	
2011–12	Col. of Charleston	7–23	6–14	8th	
College of Charleston (SoCon):		118–152 (.437)	75–99 (.431)		
College of Charleston (Total):		311–216 (.590)	75–99 (.431)		
Total:		542–365 (.598)			
National champion Postseason invitational champion Conference regular season champion Conference regular season and conference tournament champion Division regular season champion Division regular season and conference tournament champion Conference tournament champion
