= Lori Nero =

American basketball player

Personal information
- Born: August 8, 1980 (age 46) Baton Rouge, Louisiana, U.S.
- Listed height: 6 ft 2 in (1.88 m)
- Listed weight: 180 lb (82 kg)

Career information
- High school: St. Joseph's (Baton Rouge, Louisiana)
- College: Auburn (1998–2001); Louisville (2002–2003)
- WNBA draft: 2003: 2nd round, 19th overall pick
- Drafted by: Houston Comets
- Position: Power forward / center

Career highlights
- Third-team All-Conference USA (2003)
- Stats at Basketball Reference

Lori Vanessa Nero (August 8, 1980) is an American former professional basketball player. She played college basketball at Auburn University and University of Louisville.

== College statistics ==
Source Source

Legend
GP	Games played	GS	Games started	MPG	Minutes per game
FG%	Field goal percentage	3P%	3-point field goal percentage	FT%	Free throw percentage
RPG	Rebounds per game	APG	Assists per game	SPG	Steals per game
BPG	Blocks per game	PPG	Points per game	**Bold**	Career high

Year	Team	GP	Points	FG%	3P%	FT%	RPG	APG	SPG	BPG	PPG
1998-99	Auburn	7	24	70.0%	0.0%	66.7%	1.9	0.0	0.3	0.0	3.4
1999-00	Auburn	29	195	49.6%	0.0%	**72.0%**	3.5	0.1	0.4	0.8	6.7
2000-01	Auburn	29	**360**	**52.7%**	0.0%	70.5%	**6.4**	**0.6**	**0.7**	**1.1**	**12.4**
TOTAL	Auburn	65	579	52.1%	0.0%	70.8%	4.6	0.3	0.5	0.9	8.9

Year	Team	GP	Points	FG%	3P%	FT%	RPG	APG	SPG	BPG	PPG
2002-03	Louisville	24	417	53.3%	16.7%	73.4%	9.3	0.8	0.7	1.5	17.4
