= Brea Beal =

American basketball player

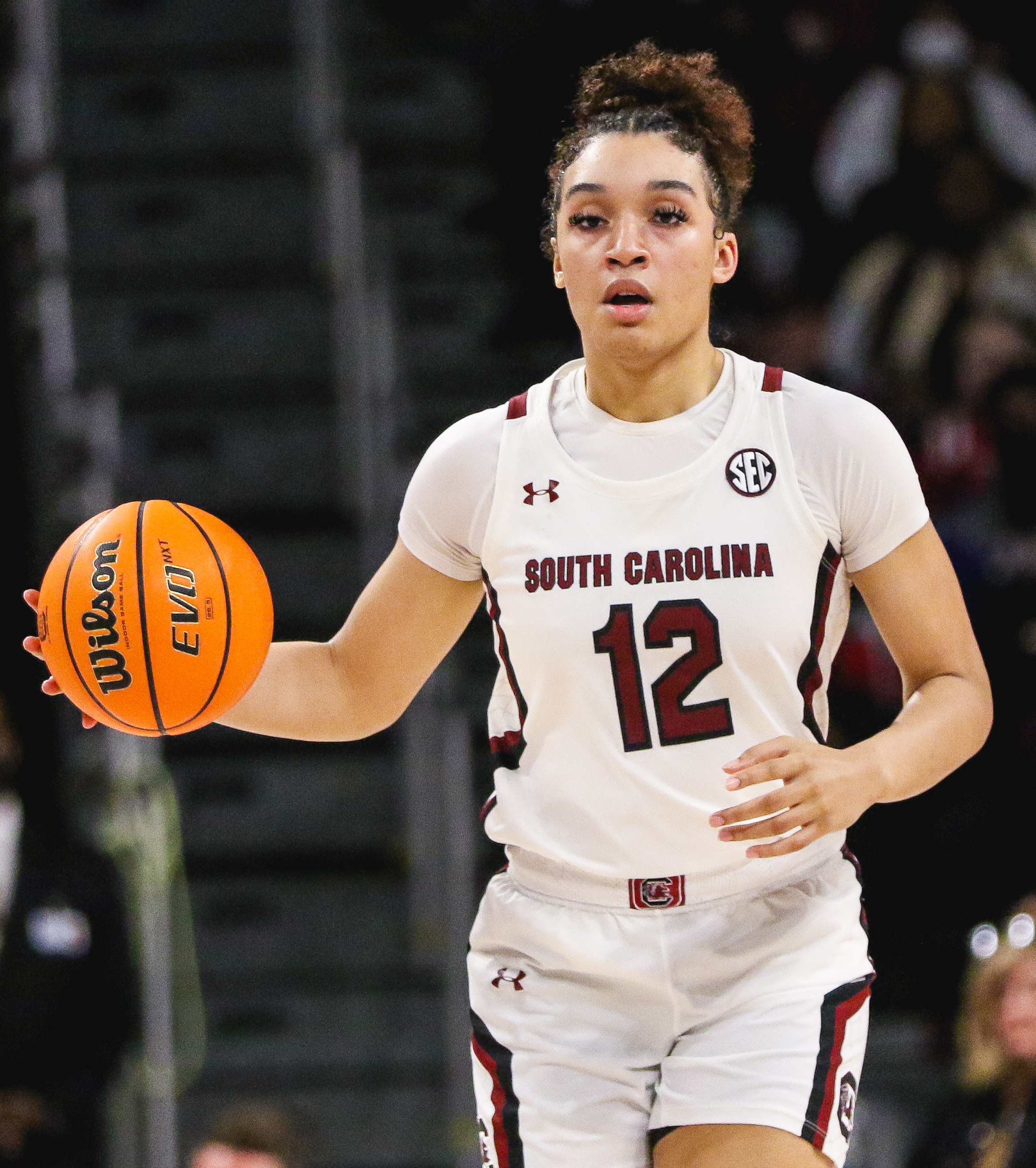
- Beal with South Carolina in 2022

South Carolina Gamecocks
- Position: Assistant coach
- Conference: SEC

Personal information
- Born: November 8, 2000 (age 26) Chicago, Illinois, U.S.
- Listed height: 6 ft 1 in (1.85 m)

Career information
- High school: Rock Island (Rock Island, Illinois)
- College: South Carolina (2019–2023)
- WNBA draft: 2023: 2nd round, 24th overall pick
- Drafted by: Minnesota Lynx
- Coaching career: 2024–present

Career highlights
- NCAA champion (2022); SEC All-Defensive Team (2023); McDonald's All-American (2019); 3× Illinois Miss Basketball (2017–2019)
- Stats at Basketball Reference

Breanna Beal (born November 8, 2000) is an American basketball player who is a free agent. She played college basketball at South Carolina Gamecocks of the Southeastern Conference (SEC).

== Early life and high school career ==
Beal was born on November 8, 2000, to Kevin Beal and Nicole Adamson. She grew up training for basketball under the guidance of her father, who played for UTEP at the collegiate level, and drew inspiration from Maya Moore. She also took part in gymnastics and swimming before focusing on basketball. In eighth grade, Beal joined the Midwest Elite Amateur Athletic Union program. She made local headlines as one of the top eighth-grade players in the country. Beal played basketball for Rock Island High School in her hometown of Rock Island, Illinois. In her first high school season, she was the only freshman on the team and averaged 16.7 points and 6.8 rebounds per game, leading Rock Island to a 29–4 record.

As a sophomore, Beal averaged 20.6 points, 9.8 rebounds, 3.2 steals and 3.1 assists per game, helping her team achieve a 31–2 record and reach the sectional final. She joined Candace Parker and Tamika Catchings as the only sophomores to be named Illinois Miss Basketball, and became the second sophomore with Parker to win Illinois Gatorade Player of the Year. In her junior season, Beal averaged 21.9 points, 10 rebounds, 3.3 assists and three blocks per game, leading Rock Island to its third consecutive Class 4A sectional runner-up finish. She repeated as Illinois Miss Basketball and Gatorade Player of the Year. As a senior, Beal averaged 24.9 points, 13.7 rebounds, 4.5 assists, 3.4 blocks and 3.4 steals per game, as her team finished with a 30–2 record and won its first sectional title since 1991. She was named Illinois Miss Basketball and Gatorade Player of the Year for a third straight season, joining Candace Parker as the only three-time recipients of either award, and was selected as Quad-City Times Female Athlete of the Year. Beal earned first-team All-American recognition from the Women's Basketball Coaches Association and played in the McDonald's All-American Game and Jordan Brand Classic. She finished her career as the all-time leading scorer in the Western Big 6 Conference.

=== Recruiting ===
Beal was considered a five-star recruit and the number 10 player in the 2019 class by ESPN. In sixth grade, she received her first college basketball scholarship offer, from Iowa. On November 8, 2018, during her senior year of high school, Beal committed to playing college basketball for South Carolina over offers from Michigan, Illinois and Louisville.

== College career ==
In her freshman season at South Carolina, Beal became a regular starter due to her defensive ability. Her team was ranked number one in the nation and had a 32–1 record before the 2020 NCAA tournament was canceled amid the COVID-19 pandemic. As a freshman, she averaged 6.1 points and 5.4 rebounds per game. On January 18, 2021, Beal scored a career-high 22 points against Arkansas. She helped South Carolina reach the Final Four of the 2021 NCAA tournament. As a sophomore, Beal averaged 7.1 points and 5.3 rebounds per game. In her junior season, she helped South Carolina win the national championship, recording 12 points against Louisville in the Final Four.

== Career statistics ==
Legend
GP	Games played	GS	Games started	MPG	Minutes per game	RPG	Rebounds per game
APG	Assists per game	SPG	Steals per game	BPG	Blocks per game	PPG	Points per game
TO	Turnovers per game	FG%	Field-goal percentage	3P%	3-point field-goal percentage	FT%	Free-throw percentage
**Bold**	Career best	°	League leader

*	Denotes season(s) in which Beal won an NCAA Championship

=== College ===
Year	Team	GP	GS	MPG	FG%	3P%	FT%	RPG	APG	SPG	BPG	TO	PPG
2019–20	South Carolina	33	33	21.2	41.6	28.9	55.7	**5.4**	1.0	0.8	0.8	1.4	6.1
2020–21	South Carolina	31	30	**27.3**	**42.6**	29.6	57.4	5.3	1.1	**0.9**	0.8	1.0	**7.1**
2021–22*	South Carolina	37	37	24.1	38.1	23.8	59.6	5.0	1.3	0.7	0.5	1.0	5.1
2022–23	South Carolina	37	37	25.2	41.7	**38.0**	**57.7**	4.3	**2.7**	0.7	**1.1**	**0.9**	6.4
**Career**		138	137	24.4	41.0	31.3	57.3	5.0	1.6	0.8	0.8	1.1	6.1
Statistics retrieved from Sports-Reference.

== Professional career ==
On April 10, 2023, Beal was selected in the second round as the 24th overall of the 2023 WNBA draft by the Minnesota Lynx. She was waived by the Lynx in mid May, before the start of their regular season.

In March 2024, the Las Vegas Aces signed Beal to a training camp contract. On May 2, 2024, the Aces waived her from their 2024 roster before the start of preseason.

== Personal life ==
After her sophomore year of college, Beal signed a name, image and likeness deal with Cameo. She is in a relationship with National Football League player and South Carolina alum Jaycee Horn. Bradley Beal is her second cousin.
