= Tyra Buss =

American basketball player (born 1996)

Personal information
- Born: April 25, 1996 (age 30) Mount Carmel, Illinois, U.S.
- Listed height: 5 ft 8 in (1.73 m)

Career information
- High school: Mount Carmel (Mount Carmel, Illinois)
- College: Indiana (2014–2018)
- WNBA draft: 2018: undrafted

Career history

Playing
- 2018: Sporting Athens
- 2023: Hozono Global Jairis Murcia

Coaching
- 2019–2021: Evansville (assistant)
- 2021–2022: Milwaukee (assistant)

Career highlights
- 4× First-team All-Big Ten (2015–2018); 2× Illinois Miss Basketball (2013, 2014); National High School Coaches Association Girls' Basketball Player of the Year (2014)

Tyra (Buss) Davison (born Tyra Marie Buss; April 25, 1996) is an American basketball player.

== High school career ==
Tyra Buss is a former standout athlete at Mount Carmel High School in Illinois. She excelled in multiple sports, including basketball, tennis, track and field, and cross-country. Buss was named Illinois Miss Basketball twice, in 2013 and 2014.

During her high school basketball career, she set numerous Illinois girls basketball records, including the highest career scoring average of 38.0 points per game, and the most career free throws made with 1,185.

She was also a four-time AP and IBCA First Team All-State honoree and twice named Illinois Player of the Year by the Champaign News Gazette.

== College career ==
Buss played college basketball at Indiana University in Bloomington, Indiana for the Indiana Hoosiers.

Buss was a four-year starter who became the Hoosiers’ then all-time leading scorer with 2,364 career points and led the Hoosiers to a 2019 WNIT title, being named the Postseason WNIT Most Valuable Player in the process. The two-time WBCA honorable mention all-American finished in the top 25 in the nation in scoring average as a senior, amassing 20.6 points per contest.

=== Indiana statistics ===
- Sports-Reference

Legend
GP	Games played	GS	Games started	MPG	Minutes per game
FG%	Field goal percentage	3P%	3-point field goal percentage	FT%	Free throw percentage
RPG	Rebounds per game	APG	Assists per game	SPG	Steals per game
BPG	Blocks per game	PPG	Points per game	**Bold**	Career high

Year	Team	GP	Points	FG%	3P%	FT%	RPG	APG	SPG	BPG	PPG
2014–15	Indiana	31	362	39.0%	24.0%	67.9%	3.6	3.2	2.1	0.1	11.7
2015–16	Indiana	33	620	41.4%	30.7%	77.2%	**5.0**	4.4	2.1	0.1	18.8
2016–17	Indiana	34	619	41.4%	**34.1%**	**81.2%**	3.3	4.6	**2.4**	0.1	18.2
2017–18	Indiana	**37**	**763**	**42.4%**	33.2%	69.5%	3.0	**4.7**	2.1	0.1	**20.6**
Career		135	2364	41.3%	31.4%	74.2%	3.7	4.3	2.2	0.1	17.5

== Professional career ==
=== Europe ===
Buss headed to Europe to play in Greece's Sporting Athens for the 2018 season.

Buss most recently played for Hozono Global Jairis Murcia in the Spanish LF Endesa league (also known as Liga Femenina de Baloncesto) as of 2023.

== Personal life ==
In July 2021, Buss became engaged to Brad Davison, a guard at Wisconsin. They were married on July 2, 2022 in Madison, Wisconsin.
