= Jolette Law =

American basketball player and coach

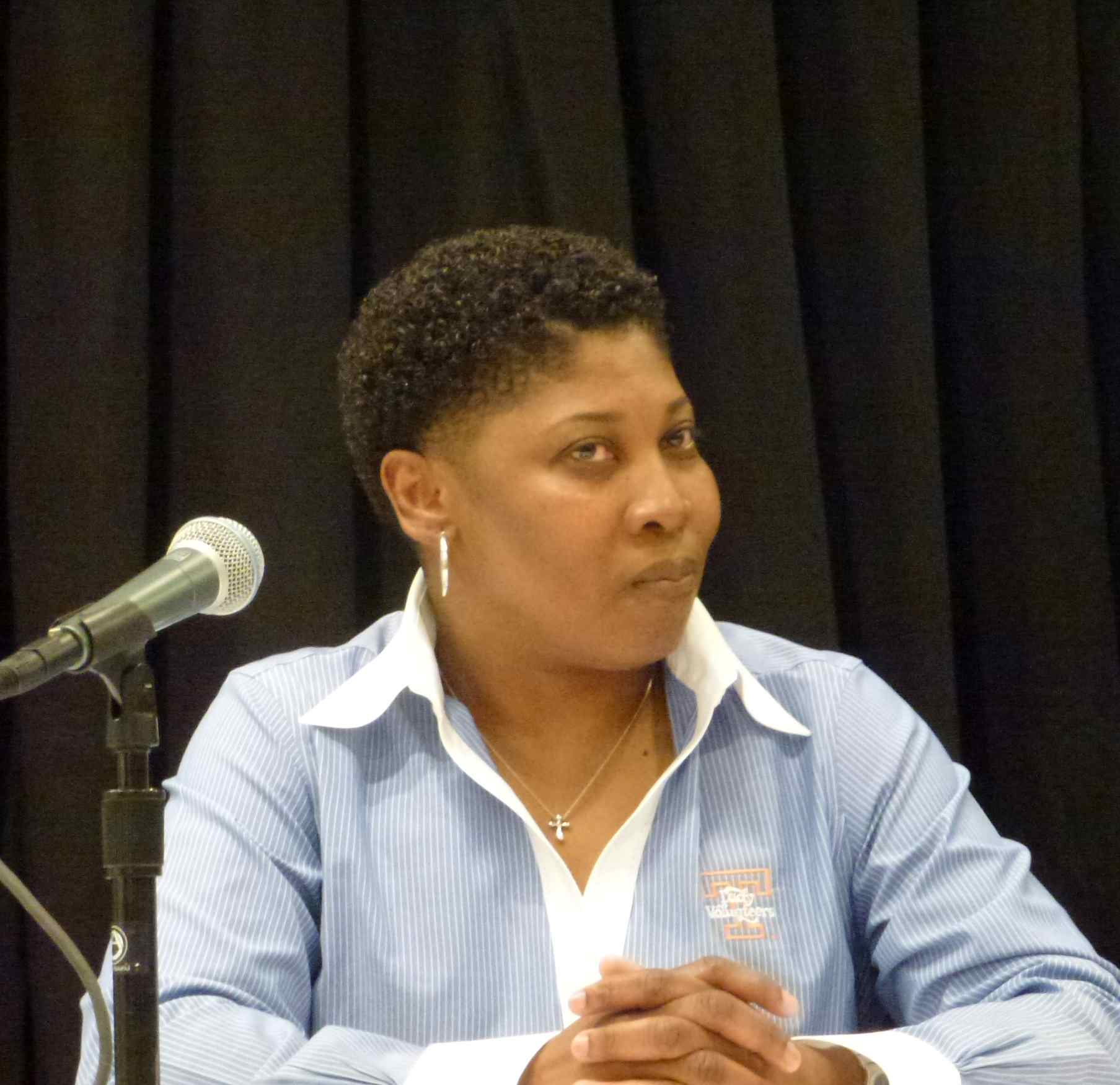

Current position
- Title: Assistant coach
- Team: South Carolina
- Conference: SEC

Biographical details
- Education: University of Iowa

Playing career
- 1987–1990: Iowa
- 1990–1994: Harlem Globetrotters

Coaching career (HC unless noted)
- 1994–1995: Ball State (assistant)
- 1995–2003: Rutgers (assistant)
- 2003–2007: Rutgers (associate HC)
- 2007–2012: Illinois
- 2012–2017: Tennessee (assistant)
- 2017–present: South Carolina (assistant)

Head coaching record
- Overall: 69–93
Medal record
Jones Cup
Silver medal – second place	1988 Jones Cup Taipei, Taiwan	Team competition

Jolette Law is an assistant coach for the South Carolina Gamecocks women's basketball team. She was previously a Tennessee Lady Volunteers basketball assistant and, before that, the Illinois Fighting Illini women's basketball head coach in addition to being a Harlem Globetrotter from 1991 to 1994. Florence, South Carolina is her hometown.

== College career ==
Law grew up in South Carolina. She was recruited by C. Vivian Stringer, then head coach at Iowa. Law visited the campus on a day when the mercury dropped to twenty degrees below zero, and Coach Stringer thought she had little chance to get her to commit. Law was still interested, but Stringer had another roadblock—Law's father, who didn't want his daughter going so far away. Stringer explained that he would be able to listen to games on the radio, as the games were broadcast on station WHO. Stringer had heard that the reach of the station was national, but she had never tried it. Jolette's father, Joe, put her to the test. He handed her an old radio and told her to find the station. Stringer tried to find the station, fiddling with the dial and the antenna, but came up empty. She then asked Joe for a coat hanger, to rig up a better antenna. He responded, "Oh, I'll get you anything you want. But unless you get that station on the radio, I'm not letting Jolette go out there." Stringer kept fiddling with the radio and suddenly they heard Larry Cutler announcing the station call sign and adding "home of the Hawkeyes". Jolette went to Iowa.

In her freshman year, Iowa played North Carolina, as close as they would get to her home. Her father arranged for a busload of friends and relatives to go to the game. However, the game was very close, and Stringer didn't think Law was ready yet for the pressure of a close game. By halftime, when Law still hadn't played, the family section was audibly reacting. Stringer could hear it, but chose to ignore it. The assistant coaches were nervous, but Stringer told them to ignore it. Near the end of the game, the dissatisfaction rose, and Stringer decided to call Joe over for a word. She also asked Jolette to listen. Stringer said, "She's going to be fine... She's not ready now, but she will be...That's all I have to say unless you're serious about her going somewhere else, in which case we need to have a conversation." Jolette chimed in, "I'm learning a lot, but I'm not ready yet." Law's father backed off. The following year, Law's sophomore year, she won a starting job over a senior, and helped the team reach a number one ranking in the country.

== Head coaching record ==
Record table
Season	Team	Overall	Conference	Standing	Postseason
Illinois Fighting Illini (Big Ten Conference) (2007–2012)
2007–08	Illinois	20–15	8–10	9th	WNIT Third Round
2008–09	Illinois	10–21	5–13	9th	
2009–10	Illinois	19–15	7–11	T–8th	WNIT Quarterfinals
2010–11	Illinois	9–23	2–14	11th	
2011–12	Illinois	11–19	5–11	T–9th	
Illinois:		69–93 (.426)	27–59 (.314)		
Total:		69–93 (.426)			

== USA Basketball ==
Law was named to the team representing the US at the 1988 William Jones Cup competition in Taipei, Taiwan. The USA team had a 3–2 record, but that was enough to secure the silver medal. She averaged 5.4 points per game and led the team with eight assists. Law was named to the All-Tournament Team.
