= Jocelyn Penn =

American basketball player (born 1979)

Personal information
- Born: September 10, 1979 (age 47) Tucker, Georgia, U.S.
- Listed height: 6 ft 0 in (1.83 m)

Career information
- High school: Meadowcreek (Norcross, Georgia)
- College: South Carolina (1998–2003)
- WNBA draft: 2003: 1st round, 9th overall pick
- Drafted by: Charlotte Sting
- Playing career: 2003–2004
- Position: Forward

Career history
- 2003: Washington Mystics
- 2004: San Antonio Silver Stars

Career highlights
- All-American – USBWA (2003); Second-team All-American – AP (2003); 2× First-team All-SEC (2002, 2003)
- Stats at Basketball Reference

Jocelyn Penn (born September 10, 1979) is an American former professional basketball player. She played in the WNBA from 2003 to 2004. She was the ninth overall pick in the 2003 WNBA draft, selected by the Charlotte Sting. She scored 50+ points, making her the first in 13 years to score two 50+ games in the same season (at the time of the accomplishment).

== Career statistics ==
Legend
GP	Games played	GS	Games started	MPG	Minutes per game	RPG	Rebounds per game
APG	Assists per game	SPG	Steals per game	BPG	Blocks per game	PPG	Points per game
TO	Turnovers per game	FG%	Field-goal percentage	3P%	3-point field-goal percentage	FT%	Free-throw percentage
**Bold**	Career best	°	League leader

=== WNBA ===
==== Regular season ====
Year	Team	GP	GS	MPG	FG%	3P%	FT%	RPG	APG	SPG	BPG	TO	PPG
2003	Washington	**30**	0	**9.6**	39.7	**15.4**	**66.7**	**1.7**	**0.5**	**0.5**	0.0	0.7	2.9
2004	San Antonio	1	0	3.0	**100.0**	0.0	0.0	1.0	0.0	0.0	0.0	**0.0**	**4.0**
Career	2 years, 2 teams	31	0	9.4	41.3	15.4	66.7	1.7	0.5	0.5	0.0	0.6	2.9

=== College ===
Legend
GP	Games played	GS	Games started	MPG	Minutes per game
FG%	Field goal percentage	3P%	3-point field goal percentage	FT%	Free throw percentage
RPG	Rebounds per game	APG	Assists per game	SPG	Steals per game
BPG	Blocks per game	PPG	Points per game	**Bold**	Career high

Year	Team	GP	Points	FG%	3P%	FT%	RPG	APG	SPG	BPG	PPG
1998–99	South Carolina	27	351	52.6	–	0.7	6.3	1.5	2.9	0.1	13.0
1999-00	South Carolina	28	347	55.2	0.0	67.4	6.1	2.3	2.6	0.1	12.4
2001–02	South Carolina	**32**	525	62.1	–	63.6	6.7	1.7	2.9	0.1	16.4
2002–03	South Carolina	30	**716**	**62.8**	**37.8**	**71.1**	**8.1**	**1.9**	**3.7**	0.0	**23.9**
Career	South Carolina	117	1939	59.3	36.8	68.0	6.9	1.8	3.1	0.1	16.6

== Personal life ==
Penn has a twin brother and two older sisters.
