= Petra Ujhelyi =

Hungarian basketball player (born 1980)

Personal information
- Born: December 17, 1980 (age 45) Nagykőrös, Hungary
- Listed height: 6 ft 4 in (1.93 m)
- Listed weight: 200 lb (91 kg)

Career information
- High school: Városmajori
- College: South Carolina (1999–2003)
- WNBA draft: 2003: 2nd round, 16th overall pick
- Drafted by: Phoenix Mercury
- Position: Power forward / center
- Number: 55

Career history
- 2003: Detroit Shock
- Stats at Basketball Reference

Petra Ujhelyi (born December 17, 1980) is a former professional basketball player for the WNBA and overseas.

== South Carolina statistics ==
Legend
GP	Games played	GS	Games started	MPG	Minutes per game
FG%	Field goal percentage	3P%	3-point field goal percentage	FT%	Free throw percentage
RPG	Rebounds per game	APG	Assists per game	SPG	Steals per game
BPG	Blocks per game	PPG	Points per game	**Bold**	Career high

Year	Team	GP	Points	FG%	3P%	FT%	RPG	APG	SPG	BPG	PPG
1999-00	South Carolina	28	174	39.1%	12.5%	75.0%	6.4	2.0	1.5	1.0	6.2
2000-01	South Carolina	28	236	**46.4%**	0.0%	**54.3%**	6.3	1.5	1.2	0.8	8.4
2001-02	South Carolina	**32**	218	43.3%	0.0%	48.5%	5.9	2.0	**1.8**	1.4	6.8
2002-03	South Carolina	31	**362**	45.2%	**29.4%**	52.8%	**9.3**	**3.3**	1.6	**1.5**	**11.7**
Career		119	990	43.9%	18.2%	55.7%	7.0	2.2	1.5	1.2	8.3

== International competition ==
Ujhelyi was a member of the following clubs/teams:

- 2009 EuroBasket Women
- 2009 EuroBasket Women: DIVISION A
- 2007 EuroBasket Women: DIVISION A
- 2005 EuroBasket Women: DIVISION A
- 2001 European Championship for Women
- 2000 European Championship for Young Women

== Personal life ==
Ujhelyi's parents and older brother competed on Hungarian national teams. In college, she majored in business.
