= 2003 WNBA draft =

2003 meeting of WNBA teams to select players

General information
- Sport: Basketball
- Date(s): April 24, 2003

Overview
- League: WNBA
- Merging teams: Miami Sol; Portland Fire (both teams folded in 2002)
- First selection: LaToya Thomas; Cleveland Rockers

The 2003 WNBA draft, both the dispersal draft and the annual WNBA draft, took place on April 24, 2003.

The dispersal draft involved players from the rosters of the Portland Fire and Miami Sol teams which had both folded after the 2002 season. For that reason, Miami's picks obtained in trades were lost. Former Sol and Fire players not selected in the dispersal draft became unrestricted free agents. The order of selection was determined by teams' 2002 regular season records, going from worst to first.

Along with the folding of the Fire and the Sol, two teams moved to new cities. The Utah Starzz moved from Salt Lake City, Utah, to San Antonio, Texas, changing their name to the San Antonio Silver Stars, and the Orlando Miracle moved from Orlando, Florida, to Uncasville, Connecticut, to become the Connecticut Sun. The Sun became the first franchise not to be based in a city that also was home to an NBA franchise.

The draft itself also changed. Instead of the previous four-round format, the 2003 draft shrank to its current format of only three rounds.

== Key ==
| ! | Denotes player who has been inducted to the Naismith Memorial Basketball Hall of Fame |
| ^ | Denotes player who has been inducted to the Women's Basketball Hall of Fame |
| * | Denotes player who has been selected for at least one All-Star Game and All-WNBA Team |
| ^{+} | Denotes player who has been selected for at least one All-Star Game |
| ^{#} | Denotes player who never played in the WNBA regular season or playoffs |
| **Bold** | Denotes player who won Rookie of the Year |

== Draft ==
=== Round 1 ===
| Pick | Player | Position | Nationality | Team | School / club team |
|---|---|---|---|---|---|
| 1 | LaToya Thomas | F | United States | Cleveland Rockers | Mississippi State |
| 2 | Chantelle Anderson | C | Lebanon | Sacramento Monarchs | Vanderbilt |
| 3 | **Cheryl Ford** * | C | United States | Detroit Shock | Louisiana Tech |
| 4 | Plenette Pierson ^{+} | F | United States | Phoenix Mercury | Texas Tech |
| 5 | Kara Lawson ^{+} | G | United States | Detroit Shock (from Connecticut, traded to Sacramento) | Tennessee |
| 6 | Gwen Jackson | F | United States | Indiana Fever | Tennessee |
| 7 | Aiysha Smith | C | United States | Washington Mystics | LSU |
| 8 | Jung Sun-min | C | South Korea | Seattle Storm | Gwangju Sinsegye Coolcats (South Korea) |
| 9 | Jocelyn Penn | F | United States | Charlotte Sting | South Carolina |
| 10 | Molly Creamer ^{#} | G | United States | New York Liberty | Bucknell |
| 11 | Coretta Brown | G | United States | San Antonio Silver Stars | North Carolina |
| 12 | Allison Curtin ^{#} | G | United States | Houston Comets (traded to Detroit) | Tulsa |

=== Round 2 ===
| Pick | Player | Position | Nationality | Team | School / club team |
|---|---|---|---|---|---|
| 13 | Courtney Coleman | F | United States | Connecticut Sun (from Detroit) | Ohio State |
| 14 | Teresa Edwards ^ ! | G | United States | Minnesota Lynx | Georgia |
| 15 | Jennifer Butler ^{#} | C | United States | Cleveland Rockers | Massachusetts |
| 16 | Petra Ujhelyi | F/C | Hungary | Phoenix Mercury (traded to Detroit) | South Carolina |
| 17 | Erin Thorn | G | United States | New York Liberty (from Sacramento) | BYU |
| 18 | Jordan Adams | C | Canada | Minnesota Lynx (from Miami) | New Mexico |
| 19 | Lori Nero ^{#} | F/C | United States | Houston Comets (from Connecticut) | Louisville |
| 20 | DeTrina White | F | United States | Indiana Fever | LSU |
| 21 | Zuzana Žirková | G | Slovakia | Washington Mystics | Gambrinus Sika Brno (Czech Republic) |
| 22 | Suzy Batkovic | C | Australia | Seattle Storm | Valenciennes (France) |
| 23 | Dana Cherry ^{#} | G | United States | Charlotte Sting | Arkansas |
| 24 | Sonja Mallory | C | United States | New York Liberty | Georgia Tech |
| 25 | Ke-Ke Tardy ^{#} | F | United States | San Antonio Silver Stars | LSU |
| 26 | K. B. Sharp | G | United States | New York Liberty (from Houston) | Cincinnati |
| 27 | Schuye LaRue ^{#} | F | United States | Los Angeles Sparks | Virginia |

=== Round 3 ===
| Pick | Player | Position | Nationality | Team | School / club team |
|---|---|---|---|---|---|
| 28 | Syreeta Bromfield ^{#} | F | United States | Detroit Shock | Michigan State |
| 29 | Carla Bennett ^{#} | C | United States | Minnesota Lynx | Drake |
| 30 | Shaquala Williams | G | United States | Cleveland Rockers | Oregon |
| 31 | Telisha Quarles ^{#} | G | United States | Phoenix Mercury (traded to Detroit) | Virginia |
| 32 | Trish Juhline ^{#} | G | United States | Washington Mystics (from Sacramento) | Villanova |
| 33 | Marion Jones | G | United States | Phoenix Mercury (from Miami) | North Carolina |
| 34 | Lindsey Wilson ^{#} | G | United States | Connecticut Sun | Iowa State |
| 35 | Ashley McElhiney ^{#} | G | United States | Indiana Fever | Vanderbilt |
| 36 | Tamara Bowie ^{#} | F | United States | Washington Mystics | Ball State |
| 37 | Chrissy Floyd ^{#} | G | United States | Seattle Storm | Clemson |
| 38 | Constance Jinks ^{#} | G | United States | Houston Comets (from Charlotte) | UNLV |
| 39 | Nicole Kaczmarski ^{#} | G | United States | New York Liberty | UCLA |
| 40 | Brooke Armistead ^{#} | G | United States | San Antonio Silver Stars | Austin Peay |
| 41 | Oxana Rakhmatulina ^{#} | G | Russia | Houston Comets | CSKA Samara (Russia) |
| 42 | Mary Jo Noon ^{#} | C | United States | Los Angeles Sparks | Purdue |

== See also ==
- List of first overall WNBA draft picks
