= Metro Conference (1975–1995) women's basketball tournament =

American college basketball conference championship

The Metro Conference women's basketball tournament was the conference championship tournament in women's basketball for the Metro Conference. The tournament was held annually between 1982 and 1996, when the Metro Conference was absorbed into Conference USA in 1996.

== Tournament champions by year ==
Year	Metro Champion	Score
1982	Memphis	
1983	Louisville	
1984	Louisville	
1985	Memphis	
1986	South Carolina	
1987	Southern Miss	
1988	South Carolina	
1989	South Carolina	
1990	Southern Miss	
1991	Florida State	
1992	Southern Miss	
1993	Louisville	
1994	Virginia Tech	
1995	Southern Miss	
