= Illinois Fighting Illini women's basketball =

Women's basketball team of the University of Illinois

Illinois Fighting Illini Women's Basketball
2026–27 Illinois Fighting Illini women's basketball team
- University: University of Illinois at Urbana–Champaign
- Founded: 1974
- Head coach: Shauna Green (5th season)
- Location: Champaign, Illinois
- Arena: State Farm Center (capacity: 15,500)
- Conference: Big Ten
- Nickname: Fighting Illini
- Colors: Orange and blue
- Student section: Orange Krush

NCAA Division I tournament Sweet Sixteen
- 1997, 1998

NCAA Division I tournament appearances
- 1982, 1986, 1987, 1997, 1998, 1999, 2000, 2003, 2023, 2025, 2026

Conference regular-season champions
- 1997

Uniforms
Home	Away	Alternate

The Illinois Fighting Illini women's basketball team is an NCAA Division I college basketball team competing in the Big Ten Conference. Home games are played at State Farm Center, located on University of Illinois at Urbana–Champaign's campus in Champaign.

== Season-by-season results ==
Sources:

- B1G 2014–2015 Standings
- B1G Record Book
- Big Ten Women's Basketball Statistics

Record table
Season	Team	Overall	Conference	Standing	Postseason
Steven Douglas (1974–1976)
1974–75	Steven Douglas	10–11	-		
1975–76	Steven Douglas	15–10	-	5th	
Steven Douglas:		25–21	-		
Carla Thompson (1976–1979)
1976–77	Carla Thompson	15–9	-	5th	
1977–78	Carla Thompson	9–9	-	5th	
1978–79	Carla Thompson	9–12	-		
Carla Thompson:		33–30	-		
Jane Schroeder (1979–1984)
1979–80	Jane Schroeder	6–21	-	5th	
1980–81	Jane Schroeder	20–11	-		
1981–82	Jane Schroeder	21–9	-	2nd	NCAA 1st Round
Big Ten Conference
1982–83	Jane Schroeder	14–14	9–9	6th	
1983–84	Jane Schroeder	12–16	6–12	8th	
Jane Schroeder:		73–71	15–21		
Laura Golden (1984–1990)
1984–85	Laura Golden	13–15	7–11	6th	
1985–86	Laura Golden	20–10	12–6	3rd	NCAA 2nd Round
1986–87	Laura Golden	19–10	11–7	4th	NCAA 2nd Round
1987–88	Laura Golden	9–19	3–15	9th	
1988–89	Laura Golden	11–18	6–12	6th	
1989–90	Laura Golden	11–17	5–13	8th	
Laura Golden:		83–89	44–64		
Kathy Lindsey (1990–1995)
1990–91	Kathy Lindsey	9–19	6–12	8th	
1991–92	Kathy Lindsey	9–19	6–12	8th	
1992–93	Kathy Lindsey	12–15	7–11	7th	
1993–94	Kathy Lindsey	10–17	5–13	10th	
1994–95	Kathy Lindsey	10–17	5–13	10th(T)	
Kathy Lindsey:		50–87	29–61		
Theresa Grentz (1995–2007)
1995–96	Theresa Grentz	13–15	6–10	8th	
1996–97	Theresa Grentz	24–8	12–4	1st(T)	NCAA Sweet 16
1997–98	Theresa Grentz	20–10	12–4	2nd	NCAA Sweet 16
1998–99	Theresa Grentz	19–12	10–6	3rd	NCAA Second Round
1999-00	Theresa Grentz	23–11	11–5	4th	NCAA Second Round
2000–01	Theresa Grentz	17–16	9–7	6th	WNIT Second Round
2001–02	Theresa Grentz	15–14	7–9	8th	WNIT Second Round
2002–03	Theresa Grentz	17–12	9–7	6th	NCAA First Round
2003–04	Theresa Grentz	10–18	4–12	8th(T)	
2004–05	Theresa Grentz	17–13	7–9	7th	WNIT First Round
2005–06	Theresa Grentz	16–15	6–10	7th	WNIT First Round
2006–07	Theresa Grentz	19–12	8–8	4th	WNIT Sweet 16
Theresa Grentz:		210–156	101–91		
Jolette Law (2007–2012)
2007–08	Jolette Law	20–15	8–10	9th	WNIT Sweet 16
2008–09	Jolette Law	10–21	5–13	9th	
2009–10	Jolette Law	19–14	7–11	9th	WNIT Elite 8
2010–11	Jolette Law	9–23	2–14	11th	
2011–12	Jolette Law	11–19	5–11	9th	
Jolette Law:		69–93	27–59		
Matt Bollant (2012–2017)
2012–13	Matt Bollant	19–14	9–7	5th(T)	WNIT Elite 8
2013–14	Matt Bollant	9–21	2–14	12th	
2014–15	Matt Bollant	15–16	6–12	10th	
2015–16	Matt Bollant	9–21	2–16	14th	
2016–17	Matt Bollant	9–22	3–13	T-11th	
Matt Bollant:		61–94	22–62		
Nancy Fahey (2017–2022)
2017–18	Nancy Fahey	9–22	0–16	14th	
2018–19	Nancy Fahey	10–20	2–16	14th	
2019–20	Nancy Fahey	11–19	2–16	13th	
2020–21	Nancy Fahey	5–18	2–16	13th	
2021–22	Nancy Fahey	7–20	1–13	14th	
Nancy Fahey:		42–99	7–77		
Shauna Green (2022–present)
2022–23	Shauna Green	22–10	11–7	T-5th	NCAA First Four
2023–24	Shauna Green	19-15	8–10	9th	WBIT Champions
2024–25	Shauna Green	22–10	11–7	T-5th	NCAA Division I Round of 32
2025–26	Shauna Green	22–12	9–9	T-9th	NCAA Division I Round of 32
Shauna Green:		85–47	39–33		
Total:		731–787			
National champion Postseason invitational champion Conference regular season champion Conference regular season and conference tournament champion Division regular season champion Division regular season and conference tournament champion Conference tournament champion

== Postseason results ==
=== NCAA tournament results ===
The Fighting Illini have appeared in the NCAA Division I women's basketball tournament eleven times. Their overall combined record is 10–11.

Year	Seed	Round	Opponent	Result
1982	#7	First Round	#2 Kentucky	L 80–88
1986	#8	First Round; Second Round	#9 Ohio #1 Georgia	W 69–68; L 64–103
1987	#8	First Round; Second Round	#9 Bowling Green #1 Auburn	W 80–64; L 58–92
1997	#4	First Round; Second Round; Sweet Sixteen	#13 Drake #5 Duke #1 Connecticut	W 79–62; W 67–65; L 73–78
1998	#3	First Round; Second Round; Sweet Sixteen	#14 UW–Green Bay #11 UC Santa Barbara #2 North Carolina	W 82–58; W 69–65; L 74–80
1999	#7	First Round; Second Round	#10 Louisville #2 Clemson	W 69–67; L 51–63
2000	#6	First Round; Second Round	#11 Utah #3 Iowa State	W 73–58; L 68–79
2003	#9	First Round	#8 Virginia	L 56–72
2023	#11	First Four	#11 Mississippi State	L 56–70
2025	#8	First Round; Second Round	#9 Creighton #1 Texas	W 66–57; L 48–65
2026	#7	First Round; Second Round	#10 Colorado #2 Vanderbilt	W 66–57; L 57–75

=== WBIT results ===
The Fighting Illini have played in the Women's Basketball Invitation Tournament (WBIT) one time, winning it in 2024. Their combined record is 5–0.

Year	Round	Opponent	Result
2024	First Round; Second Round; Quarterfinals; Semifinals; Championship	Missouri State; Stony Brook; Tulsa; Washington State; Villanova	W 74–69; W 79–62; W 69–61; W 81–58; W 71–57

== Coaching history ==
Coach	Years	Record	Conference record	Conference titles	NCAA appearances
Steven Douglas	1974–1976	25–21	–	–	–
Carla Thompson	1976–1979	33–30	–	–	–
Jane Schroeder	1979–1984	73–71	15–21	–	1
Laura Golden	1984–1990	83–89	44–64	–	2
Kathy Lindsey	1990–1995	50–87	29–61	–	–
Theresa Grentz	1995–2007	210–156	101–91	1	5
Jolette Law	2007–2012	69–93	27–59	–	–
Matt Bollant	2012–2017	61–94	22–62	–	–
Nancy Fahey	2017–2022	42–99	7–77	–	–
Shauna Green	2022–	85–47	39–33	–	3
Totals		729–785	284–468	1	11

Source for coaching history

== International ==
- Jaelyne Kirkpatrick Canada: 2017 Summer Universiade

== See also ==
- Illinois Fighting Illini men's basketball
