= South Carolina Gamecocks women's basketball =

University of South Carolina basketball team

South Carolina Gamecocks
2026–27 South Carolina Gamecocks women's basketball team
- University: University of South Carolina
- Athletic director: Jeremiah Donati
- Head coach: Dawn Staley (19th season)
- Location: Columbia, South Carolina
- Arena: Colonial Life Arena (capacity: 18,000)
- Conference: SEC
- Nickname: Gamecocks
- Colors: Garnet and black
- Student section: The Cockpit
- All-time record: 1,096–543 (.669)

NCAA Division I tournament champions
- 2017, 2022, 2024
Other NCAA Division I tournament results
Runner-up	2025, 2026
Final Four	2015, 2017, 2021, 2022, 2023, 2024, 2025, 2026
Elite Eight	2002, 2015, 2017, 2018, 2021, 2022, 2023, 2024, 2025, 2026
Sweet Sixteen	1982, 1990, 2002, 2012, 2014, 2015, 2016, 2017, 2018, 2019, 2021, 2022, 2023, 2024, 2025, 2026
Appearances	1982, 1986, 1988, 1989, 1990, 1991, 2002, 2003, 2012, 2013, 2014, 2015, 2016, 2017, 2018, 2019, 2021, 2022, 2023, 2024, 2025, 2026

AIAW tournament Final Four
- 1980
Other AIAW tournament results
Quarterfinals	1980
Second round	1980
Appearances	1973, 1980

Conference tournament champions
- Metro Conference: 1986, 1988, 1989; SEC: 2015, 2016, 2017, 2018, 2020, 2021, 2023, 2024, 2025

Conference regular-season champions
- Metro Conference: 1986, 1988, 1989, 1990, 1991; SEC: 2014, 2015, 2016, 2017, 2020, 2022, 2023, 2024, 2025, 2026

Uniforms
Home	Away	Alternate

The South Carolina Gamecocks women's basketball team represents the University of South Carolina and competes in the Southeastern Conference (SEC). Under head coach Dawn Staley, the Gamecocks have been one of the most dominant powerhouse programs in the country, winning NCAA Championships in 2017, 2022, and 2024, and claiming the SEC regular season championship 10 times and SEC tournament championship 9 times between the 2013-14 season to the 2025-26 season, essentially ruling the conference for over a decade. Additionally, the Gamecocks were back to back NCAA Tournament Runner Ups in 2025 and 2026, further cementing their status as perennial national championship contenders. The program also enjoyed success under head coach Nancy Wilson during the 1980s in the Metro Conference, when it won five regular season conference championships and three conference tournament championships. The Gamecocks have the second most NCAA Championships, final four appearances, regular season conference championships, and conference tournament championships of any team in the SEC, trailing only Tennessee.

== History ==
=== Program Origins and Early Development (1974–1984) ===
==== Founding and Early Coaches ====
The University of South Carolina introduced women’s basketball in the 1974–75 season, with Pam Backhaus serving as the first head coach. The team played an independent schedule, typical of many fledgling programs at the time, and faced mostly regional opponents. Early institutional support was limited; practices and games were held in small gymnasiums, often with minimal attendance, and financial backing lagged behind that of men’s programs.

Backhaus coached for two seasons, compiling a 26–30 record. She was succeeded by Pam Parsons (1977–1981), who led the Gamecocks to four consecutive winning seasons, including a 30–6 record in 1979–80, winning the NWIT and achieving the most prestigious season to date. Parson's tenure helped establish a more stable foundation, though the team remained outside of national relevance.

==== Controversy in the Early 1980s ====
Parsons’ 1981–82 squad finished 23–8 and participated in the AIAW national tournament, reaching the Sweet Sixteen. That tournament appearance was the first notable postseason achievement for the Gamecocks. However, Parsons’ tenure ended abruptly after allegations surfaced of an inappropriate relationship with a player. The scandal, which drew national media attention including a 1982 Sports Illustrated exposé, led to her resignation and cast a shadow over the program. Assistant coach Terry Kelly finished the 1981–82 season and coached through the 1983–84 season, compiling a 50–32 overall record.

=== The Nancy Wilson Era and Metro Conference Dominance (1984–1991) ===
==== Building a Conference Power ====
In 1984, South Carolina hired Nancy Wilson as head coach following a successful stint at the College of Charleston. Wilson brought immediate structure and long-term vision to the program. In her first season (1984–85), the team went 18–10. South Carolina joined the Metro Conference in 1983–84 (initially as independents, then full members), providing the program with consistent regional competition and access to automatic NCAA bids.

From the mid-1980s through the early 1990s, South Carolina emerged as one of the top programs in the Metro. Wilson’s teams were known for their disciplined, physical style and strong defensive principles. Between 1986 and 1991, the Gamecocks won five Metro Conference regular season titles (1986, 1988, 1989, 1990, 1991) and three Metro Tournament championships (1986, 1988, 1989).

==== NCAA Tournament Appearances ====
South Carolina made its NCAA Tournament debut in 1986 as a #7 seed but lost to Middle Tennessee State in the first round, 78–77. In 1988, the Gamecocks reached the second round of the tournament as a #8 seed. The 1988 team finished 23–11 and defeated Alabama before losing to eventual Elite Eight team Texas, 77–58. In 1989, they returned to the tournament as a #6 seed but were upset by #11 seeded Tennessee tech in the opening round.

In the 1990 NCAA tournament, the Gamecocks earned a #5 seed and managed to defeat Bowling Green and Northwestern in the first two rounds to advance to their second ever Sweet Sixteen. However, they ultimately lost to #1 seed Washington, 73–61. The 1989-90 team finished with a 24–9 overall record, finishing 16th in the Coaches poll.

Although they failed to break through to the Sweet Sixteen during Wilson’s peak Metro years, the program was considered one of the strongest among non-power conferences. The team regularly won 20+ games, and Colonial Life Arena (then Carolina Coliseum) began drawing respectable crowds for marquee matchups.

==== Key Players ====
Among the standout players of the Metro era was Sheila Foster, a 6’2” forward who became South Carolina’s all-time leading scorer and rebounder at the time of her graduation. Foster was a three-time All-Metro selection and finished her career with over 2,000 points and 1,400 rebounds. Another significant figure was Brenda Biggerstaff, who earned all-conference honors in the mid-1980s and helped anchor the team during its early tournament appearances.

=== Struggles in the Southeastern Conference (1991–1997) ===
==== SEC Transition and Increased Competition ====
In 1991, South Carolina left the Metro Conference and joined the Southeastern Conference (SEC), which had rapidly established itself as the most competitive women’s basketball league in the country. The SEC had added women’s basketball as a sponsored sport in 1982–83 and was home to national powers such as Tennessee under Pat Summitt, Georgia under Andy Landers, Auburn under Joe Ciampi, Vanderbilt under Jim Foster, and later, Alabama under Rick Moody.

The transition proved difficult. In their first five years in the SEC (1991–96), the Gamecocks never finished higher than seventh in the league standings and posted a cumulative SEC record of 12–43. The increased level of competition, combined with a recruiting disadvantage compared to more established programs, led to a marked decline in performance.

==== Shannon Johnson Era ====
Despite the team’s struggles, the mid-1990s saw the emergence of one of the most talented players in program history: Shannon “Pee Wee” Johnson. A dynamic point guard from Hartsville, South Carolina, Johnson played from 1992 to 1996 and became a four-time All-SEC selection. She scored over 2,000 career points and later represented the United States at the 2004 Olympics.

Johnson’s individual brilliance helped the Gamecocks remain competitive in individual games but could not lift the team into national contention. South Carolina failed to make an NCAA Tournament appearance during her career, and Wilson’s inability to adjust to the demands of the SEC eventually led to her departure following the 1996–97 season.

Nancy Wilson finished her South Carolina tenure with a 231–149 record across 13 seasons. While she left as the winningest coach in program history at the time, her legacy was shaped largely by Metro Conference dominance rather than national success.

=== The Susan Walvius Era (1997–2008) ===
==== Initial Rebuilding and Growing Pains ====
In 1997, South Carolina hired Susan Walvius, who had previously coached at VCU. Walvius inherited a team in transition and immediately began implementing a defense-focused system rather than a scrappy offensive based system. Her first four seasons (1997–2001) were marked by losing records and minimal postseason success, though her recruiting efforts laid the groundwork for future improvement. The Gamecocks still had to contend with national powers Tennessee and Georgia, plus resurgent LSU.

Among the key players recruited during this time was Jocelyn Penn, a versatile forward who would become one of the most prolific scorers in school history. Penn’s arrival, along with the development of point guard Cristina Ciocan and forward Shaunzinski Gortman, would catalyze the program’s most successful stretch in two decades.

==== 2001–02: Breakthrough Season ====
The 2001–02 team remains one of the most successful in program history. South Carolina finished 25–7 overall, 10–4 in SEC play (third place), and earned a No. 3 seed in the NCAA Tournament. The Gamecocks defeated Wisconsin–Green Bay, Texas Tech, and Louisiana Tech to reach the Elite Eight for the first time in program history.

They fell to eventual national runner-up Duke, 77–68, but the run marked a high point for Walvius’s tenure. Jocelyn Penn averaged 24.8 points per game and was named a third-team All-American. The team ended the season ranked in 13th in the Coaches poll nationally.

==== Brief Success and Plateau ====
South Carolina returned to the NCAA Tournament in 2003 but was eliminated in the second round by Penn State. Penn graduated as the program’s second all-time leading scorer, and the Gamecocks struggled to maintain momentum. Despite the emergence of international standouts like Ilona Burgrova and Iva Sliskovic, South Carolina failed to reach the NCAA Tournament again under Walvius.

The team made a WNIT second round appearance in 2006 but posted consecutive subpar seasons in 2006–07 and 2007–08. Walvius resigned in April 2008 with a 165–160 record across 11 seasons. Her tenure was defined by the Elite Eight run but marred by inconsistency and underperformance in SEC play (a 51–103 record).

=== Dawn Staley Era (2008–present) ===
The most transformative period in South Carolina women’s basketball history began with the hiring of Dawn Staley in May 2008. A Hall of Fame point guard and three-time Olympic gold medalist, Staley arrived in Columbia after eight successful seasons at Temple, where she had led the Owls to six NCAA Tournament appearances. Tasked with rebuilding a program that had struggled for relevance in the SEC and had not made the NCAA Tournament since 2003, Staley faced a significant challenge. Over the next decade and a half, she would build South Carolina into one of the sport’s most consistent national powers, highlighted by three national championships, multiple Final Four appearances, and a steady presence at or near the top of national rankings in women's college basketball.

==== Early Rebuilding (2008–2011) ====
Staley’s first three seasons were characterized by limited roster depth and growing pains. The 2008–09 Gamecocks finished 10–18 overall and tied for 11th in the SEC, winning just two conference games. The team ranked near the bottom of the league in most offensive categories, and was frequently overmatched by more established programs.

Modest improvement came over the next two seasons, with South Carolina finishing 14–15 in 2009–10 and reaching the WNIT quarterfinals in 2010–11. Guards La’Keisha Sutton and Leasia Walker were among the team’s few consistent offensive options during this period. Staley began to establish a culture of defensive toughness and disciplined half-court play, while simultaneously laying the groundwork for future recruiting successes and offensive prowess.

==== NCAA Tournament Return and Rise to SEC Contention (2011–2014) ====
South Carolina returned to the NCAA Tournament in 2011–12 for the first time since 2003, finishing 25–10 and reaching the Sweet Sixteen before losing to #1 seed Stanford 76–60. The team was led by a young core including Tiffany Mitchell, Aleighsa Welch, and Khadijah Sessions. Staley’s recruiting began to show results, particularly in the frontcourt, where players like Welch and Asia Dozier provided interior depth and offensive coordination.

By the 2013–14 season, South Carolina had emerged as a legitimate SEC title contender. The Gamecocks won their first SEC regular season championship with a 14–2 league record and entered the NCAA Tournament as a No. 1 seed for the first time. Mitchell was named SEC Player of the Year, averaging 15.5 points per game, and freshman center Alaina Coates earned SEC Freshman of the Year honors. The team reached the Sweet Sixteen before falling to North Carolina, 65–58.

==== Final Four Breakthrough and Arrival of A’ja Wilson (2014–2017) ====
The 2014–15 season marked a significant breakthrough. South Carolina finished 34–3, won both the SEC regular season and tournament championships, and advanced to the program’s first Final Four. Much of the team’s success was attributed to the maturation of Mitchell, Welch, and Coates, as well as the arrival of 6’5” freshman forward A’ja Wilson, the top-ranked recruit in the nation and a Columbia native. Wilson averaged 13.1 points and 6.6 rebounds per game and was named the National Freshman of the Year. The Gamecocks were narrowly defeated in the National Semifinals by Notre Dame, 66–65, after a potential game-winning shot was off the mark in the final seconds.

In 2015–16, South Carolina went 33–2 and posted its first undefeated SEC season (16–0), winning both the regular season and tournament championships. Wilson, now a sophomore, averaged 16.1 points and 8.7 rebounds and earned SEC Player of the Year honors. Despite high expectations and a No. 1 seed in the NCAA tournament, the Gamecocks were upset in the Sweet Sixteen by eventual national runner-up Syracuse, ending their season earlier than anticipated.

The 2016–17 campaign was the most successful in program history to that point. With Wilson now a junior, and, joined by high-impact transfers Allisha Gray (North Carolina) and Kaela Davis (Georgia Tech), South Carolina again swept the SEC titles and entered the NCAA Tournament as a No. 1 seed. The Gamecocks advanced past Quinnipiac in the Sweet Sixteen and Florida State in the Elite Eight to reach their second Final Four. They then defeated Stanford 62–53 in the National Semifinals and Mississippi State in the national championship game, 67–55, to capture the program's first ever national title. Wilson was named the Final Four’s Most Outstanding Player, and Staley became the second Black woman to coach a national championship team in Division I women’s basketball history. The team finished with a 33–4 overall season record.

==== Transition and the Arrival of a New Core (2017–2020) ====
Wilson returned for her senior season in 2017–18 and delivered the best individual campaign in program history to that point, averaging 22.6 points, 11.8 rebounds, and 3.2 blocks per game. She won every major national player of the year award, including the Naismith, Wooden, and AP honors. South Carolina finished 29–7 while winning and being the only team to win the SEC tournament for four straight years. The team managed to reach to the Elite Eight in the NCAA tournament, but was eliminated by UConn in what would be Wilson’s final collegiate game.

Following Wilson’s graduation and the departure of multiple veterans, the Gamecocks experienced a brief regression in 2018–19. They finished 23–10, placed second in the SEC, and advanced to the Sweet Sixteen as a #4 seed in the NCAA tournament before a lopsided loss to eventual champion Baylor, 93–68. The season was largely viewed as a transitional period between the Wilson era and the team's current era of national dominance.

The program’s next major leap came with the arrival of the nation’s top-ranked recruiting class in 2019. That class included freshman center Aliyah Boston, guards Zia Cooke and Brea Beal, forward Laeticia Amihere, and walk-on Olivia Thompson. Boston made an immediate impact, averaging 12.5 points, 9.4 rebounds, and 2.6 blocks per game as a freshman. She became the first player in NCAA history to record a triple-double in her debut and was named the national Freshman of the Year.

The 2019–20 Gamecocks finished 32–1 and went undefeated in SEC play (16–0), winning both the conference and regular season titles. South Carolina entered the NCAA Tournament ranked No. 1 in the AP poll and riding a 26–game winning streak. However, the COVID-19 pandemic led to the cancellation of the tournament, denying the team a chance at a second national title. However, they were the consensus No. 1 team in the final rankings and hence were named "mythical national champions".

==== Consistent National Contention (2020–2023) ====
South Carolina remained one of the top teams in the country in 2020–21, finishing 26–5 and advancing to the Final Four in the NCAA tournament. The Gamecocks were eliminated in the National Semifinals by eventual champion Stanford, 66–65, after missing two potential game-winning shots in the final seconds. Boston earned consensus first-team All-American honors and was named the Naismith Defensive Player of the Year.

The Gamecocks' 2021–22 season was one of the most dominant in modern women’s college basketball. South Carolina went 35–2, held the No. 1 ranking wire-to-wire all season, and defeated UConn 64–49 in the national championship game to capture their second national title. Boston averaged 16.8 points, 12.5 rebounds, and 2.4 blocks per game, recording 30 double-doubles and winning every major national player of the year award. Zia Cooke (10.7 PPG) and Destanni Henderson (11.5 PPG) provided perimeter scoring, while Brea Beal anchored the wing defensively. The Gamecocks led the nation in rebounds per game (47.4) and opponent field goal percentage (.324).

South Carolina returned most of its championship roster in 2022–23 and entered the NCAA Tournament undefeated. The Gamecocks extended their win streak to 42 games before falling to Iowa in the Final Four, 77–73. Iowa’s Caitlin Clark scored 41 points, and South Carolina’s drop coverage defensive scheme was heavily scrutinized postgame. Boston, Cooke, Beal, and Amihere all declared for the WNBA draft after the season.

==== Undefeated Redemption (2023–24) ====
Despite losing all five starters in the 2023–24 season, South Carolina retooled quickly behind the emergence of junior point guard Raven Johnson, 6’7” center Kamilla Cardoso, and freshmen MiLaysia Fulwiley and Tessa Johnson. Transfers Te-Hina Paopao (Oregon) and Sakima Walker (Northwest Florida State) also joined the rotation. Fulwiley, in particular, drew national attention for her flashy ball-handling and elite shot-making.

The Gamecocks went 16–0 in SEC play, won both their conference regular season and tournament titles, and entered the NCAA Tournament as the No. 1 overall seed. They defeated Presbyterian, North Carolina, Indiana, and Oregon State to reach their 6th Final Four. In the National Semifinals, the Gamecocks handily defeated #3 seeded NC State, 78–59. In the national championship game, they defeated Iowa 87–75 in a rematch of the previous year’s Final Four. Cardoso was named the Final Four’s Most Outstanding Player, and South Carolina completed its first undefeated season in program history (38–0) to capture its third national title.

== Current roster ==
2026–27 South Carolina Gamecocks women's basketball team
Players
Coaches

Pos.	#	Name	Height	Year	Previous school	Hometown
F	0	Oliviyah Edwards	6 ft 3 in (1.91 m)	Fr	Lincoln	Tacoma, WA
F	2	Ashlyn Watkins	6 ft 3 in (1.91 m)	Sr	Cardinal Newman	Columbia, SC
G	3	Kaeli Wynn	6 ft 2 in (1.88 m)	Fr	Mater Dei	Santa Ana, CA
G	5	Tessa Johnson	6 ft 0 in (1.83 m)	Sr	St. Michael-Albertville	Albertville, MN
G	6	Brooke Quarles-Daniels	5 ft 7 in (1.7 m)	Sr	Michigan	Macomb, MI
G	7	Jordan Lee	6 ft 0 in (1.83 m)	Jr	Texas	Stockton, CA
F	8	Joyce Edwards	6 ft 3 in (1.91 m)	Jr	Camden	Camden, SC
G	9	Jerzy Robinson	6 ft 0 in (1.83 m)	Fr	Sierra Canyon	Chatsworth, CA
C	15	Adhel Tac	6 ft 5 in (1.96 m)	Jr	South Grand Prairie	Grand Prairie, TX
F	21	Chloe Kitts	6 ft 2 in (1.88 m)	RS Sr	DME Academy	Oviedo, FL
F	23	Kelsi Andrews	6 ft 3 in (1.91 m)	Fr	IMG Academy	Hazel Green, AL
G	24	Ayla McDowell	6 ft 2 in (1.88 m)	So	Cypress Springs	Cypress, TX
F	31	Alicia Tournebize	6 ft 7 in (2.01 m)	So	Lycée Alain Fournier	Charmeil, FRA
G	32	Justine Loubens	6 ft 1 in (1.85 m)	Fr	Ligue Féminine de Basketball	L'Isle-Jourdain, FRA
G	44	Agot Makeer	6 ft 1 in (1.85 m)	So	Montverde Academy	Ontario, CAN

Head coach

- Dawn Staley (Virginia)

Assistant coach(es)

- Lisa Boyer (AHC) (Ithaca)
- Jolette Law (Iowa)
- Mary Wooley (USC Aiken)
- Khadijah Sessions (South Carolina)
- Wendale Farrow (Eastern Michigan)

Legend

- (C) Team captain
- (S) Suspended
- (I) Ineligible
- (W) Walk-on
- Injured
- Current redshirt

Roster
Last update: April 17, 2026

== Head coaches ==
Name	Years	Seasons	Games	Won	Lost	Pct.
Pam Backhaus	1974–1975; 1976–1977	2	56	26	30	.464
Frankie Porter	1975–1976	1	22	7	15	.318
Pam Parsons	1977–1981	5	144	101	43	.701
Terry Kelly	1982–1984	3	82	50	32	.610
Nancy Wilson	1985–1997	13	380	231	149	.608
Susan Walvius	1998–2008	11	325	165	160	.508
Dawn Staley	2008–present	18	630	516	114	.819
All-Time		53	1639	1096	543	.668

== 2026-27 Coaching Staff ==
Name	Position	Consecutive season at South Carolina in current position
Dawn Staley	Head coach	19th
Lisa Boyer	Associate head coach	19th
Jolette Law	Assistant coach	10th
Khadijah Sessions	Assistant coach	4th
Mary Wooley	Assistant coach	4th
Wendale Farrow	Assistant coach	2nd

== Year-by-year results ==
Conference tournament winners noted with # Source

Season	Team	Overall	Conference	Standing	Postseason	Coaches' poll	AP poll
Pam Backhaus (Independent) (1974–1975)
1974–75	Pam Backhaus	18–12 (.600)	–		AIAW Region II		
Frankie Porter (Independent) (1975–1976)
1975–76	Frankie Porter	7–15					
Frankie Porter:		7–15	.318				
Pam Backhaus (Independent) (1976–1977)
1976–77	Pam Backhaus	8–18	–		SCAIAW		
Pam Backhaus:		26–30 (.464)	–				
Pam Parsons (Independent) (1977–1982)
1977–78	Pam Parsons	24–10	–		AIAW Region II		
1978–79	Pam Parsons	27–10	–		AIAW Region II; NWIT Champions		15
1979–80	Pam Parsons	30–6	–		AIAW Third Place		4
1980–81	Pam Parsons	13–17	–		AIAW Region II		
1981	Pam Parsons	7–0	–				
Pam Parsons:		101–43 (.701)	–				
Terry Kelly (Independent, Metro) (1982–1985)
1982	Terry Kelly	16–8	–		NCAA Sweet Sixteen		
1982–83	Terry Kelly	16–12	–				
1983–84	Terry Kelly	18–12	7–3				
Terry Kelly:		50–32 (.610)	7–3 (.700)				
Nancy Wilson (Metro, SEC) (1984–1997)
1984–85	Nancy Wilson	18–10	8–3	T–1st			
1985–86	Nancy Wilson	19–11	9–1	1st	NCAA First Round		
1986–87	Nancy Wilson	18–12	8–4	3rd			
1987–88	Nancy Wilson	23–11	10–2	1st	NCAA Second Round	24	
1988–89	Nancy Wilson	23–7	10–2	1st	NCAA First Round	22	17
1989–90	Nancy Wilson	24–9	13–1	1st	NCAA Sweet Sixteen	16	19
1990–91	Nancy Wilson	22–9	12–2	1st	NCAA First Round		
1991–92	Nancy Wilson	13–15	2–9	12th (SEC)			
1992–93	Nancy Wilson	17–10	5–6	T-6th			
1993–94	Nancy Wilson	14–13	2–9	T-10th			
1994–95	Nancy Wilson	12–15	1–10	T-10th			
1995–96	Nancy Wilson	16–12	2–9	T-11th			
1996–97	Nancy Wilson	12–15	1–11	T-11th			
Nancy Wilson:		231–149 (.608)	83–69 (.546)				
Susan Walvius (SEC) (1997–2008)
1997–98	Susan Walvius	13–15	3–11	T-11th			
1998–99	Susan Walvius	11–16	0–14	12th			
1999–00	Susan Walvius	13–15	3–11	11th			
2000–01	Susan Walvius	11–17	6–8	T-6th			
2001–02	Susan Walvius	25–7	10–4	T-2nd	NCAA Elite Eight	6	13
2002–03	Susan Walvius	23–8	9–5	T-5th	NCAA Second Round	18	16
2003–04	Susan Walvius	10–18	1–13	12th			
2004–05	Susan Walvius	8–21	2–12	12th			
2005–06	Susan Walvius	17–12	7–7	7th	WNIT Second round		
2006–07	Susan Walvius	18–15	6–8	T-7th	WNIT Third Round		
2007–08	Susan Walvius	16–16	4–10	T-9th	WNIT Second Round		
Susan Walvius:		165–160 (.508)	51–103 (.331)				
Dawn Staley (SEC) (2008–present)
2008–09	Dawn Staley	10–18	2–12	11th			
2009–10	Dawn Staley	14–15	7–9	T-7th			
2010–11	Dawn Staley	18–15	8–8	T-5th	WNIT second round		
2011–12	Dawn Staley	25–10	10–6	T-4th	NCAA Sweet Sixteen	21	25
2012–13	Dawn Staley	25–8	11–5	T-4th	NCAA Second Round	14	17
2013–14	Dawn Staley	29–5	14–2	1st	NCAA Sweet Sixteen	8	8
2014–15	Dawn Staley	34–3	15–1	1st	NCAA Final Four	3	4
2015–16	Dawn Staley	33–2	16–0	1st	NCAA Sweet Sixteen	3	5
2016–17	Dawn Staley	33–4	14–2	1st	NCAA Champions	1	3
2017–18	Dawn Staley	29–7	12–4	T-2nd	NCAA Elite Eight	6	7
2018–19	Dawn Staley	23–10	13–3	2nd	NCAA Sweet Sixteen	13	15
2019–20	Dawn Staley	32–1	16–0	1st	Canceled due to COVID-19	1	1
2020–21	Dawn Staley	26–5	14–2	2nd	NCAA Final Four	4	6
2021–22	Dawn Staley	35–2	15–1	1st	NCAA Champions	1	1
2022–23	Dawn Staley	36–1	16–0	1st	NCAA Final Four	3	1
2023–24	Dawn Staley	38–0	16–0	1st	NCAA Champions	1	1
2024–25	Dawn Staley	35–4	15–1	T-1st	NCAA Runner-up	2	2
2025-26	Dawn Staley	36–4	15–1	1st	NCAA Runner-up	2	2
2026-27	Dawn Staley	5–0	0–0			1	1
Dawn Staley:		516–114 (.819)	229–58 (.798)				
Total:		1096–543 (.669)	Metro : 77–18 (.811); SEC: 293–214 (.578)				
National champion Postseason invitational champion Conference regular season champion Conference regular season and conference tournament champion Division regular season champion Division regular season and conference tournament champion Conference tournament champion

== Postseason results ==
=== NCAA Division I ===
South Carolina has reached the NCAA Division I women's basketball tournament 22 times. They have a record of 60–19.

Year	Seed	Round	Opponent	Result
1982	#3	First round Sweet Sixteen	#6 East Carolina #2 Kentucky	W 79–54; L 69–73
1986	#7	First round	#10 Middle Tennessee	L 77–78
1988	#8	First round Second round	#9 Alabama #1 Texas	W 77–63; L 58–77
1989	#6	First round	#11 Tennessee Tech	L 73–77
1990	#5	First round Second round Sweet Sixteen	#12 Bowling Green #4 Northwestern #1 Washington	W 93–50; W 76–67; L 61–73
1991	#7	First round	#10 Vanderbilt	L 64–73
2002	#3	First round Second round Sweet Sixteen; Elite Eight	#14 Liberty #6 Cincinnati #7 Drake #1 Duke	W 69–61; W 75–56; W 79–65; L 68–77
2003	#5	First round Second round	#12 UT Chattanooga #4 Penn State	W 68–54; L 67–77
2012	#5	First round Second round Sweet Sixteen	#12 Eastern Michigan #4 Purdue #1 Stanford	W 80–48; W 72–61; L 60–76
2013	#4	First round Second round	#13 South Dakota State #12 Kansas	W 74–53; L 69–75
2014	#1	First round Second round Sweet Sixteen	#16 Cal St Northridge #9 Oregon State #4 North Carolina	W 73–58; W 78–69; L 58–65
2015	#1	First round Second round Sweet Sixteen; Elite Eight; Final Four	#16 Savannah State #8 Syracuse #4 North Carolina #2 Florida State #1 Notre Dame	W 81–48; W 97–68; W 67–65; W 80–74; L 65–66
2016	#1	First round Second round Sweet Sixteen	#16 Jacksonville #9 Kansas State #4 Syracuse	W 77–41; W 73–47; L 72–80
2017	#1	First round Second round Sweet Sixteen; Elite Eight; Final Four; National Championship	#16 UNC Asheville #8 Arizona State #12 Quinnipiac #3 Florida State #2 Stanford #2 Mississippi State	W 90–40; W 71–68; W 100–58; W 71–64; W 62–53; W 67–55
2018	#2	First round Second round Sweet Sixteen; Elite Eight	#15 North Carolina A&T #10 Virginia #11 Buffalo #1 Connecticut	W 63–52; W 66–56; W 79–63; L 65–94
2019	#4	First round Second round Sweet Sixteen	#13 Belmont #5 Florida State #1 Baylor	W 74–52; W 72–64; L 68–93
2021	#1	First round Second round Sweet Sixteen; Elite Eight; Final Four	#16 Mercer #8 Oregon State #5 Georgia Tech #6 Texas #1 Stanford	W 79–53; W 59–42; W 76–65; W 62–34; L 65–66
2022	#1	First round Second round Sweet Sixteen; Elite Eight; Final Four; National Championship	#16 Howard #8 Miami #5 North Carolina #10 Creighton #1 Louisville #2 Connecticut	W 79–21; W 49–33; W 69–61; W 80–50; W 72–59; W 64–49
2023	#1	First round Second Round; Sweet Sixteen; Elite Eight; Final Four	#16 Norfolk State #8 South Florida #4 UCLA #2 Maryland #2 Iowa	W 72–40; W 76–45; W 59–43; W 86–75; L 73–77
2024	#1	First round Second Round; Sweet Sixteen; Elite Eight; Final Four; National Championship	#16 Presbyterian #8 North Carolina #4 Indiana #3 Oregon State #3 NC State #1 Iowa	W 91–39; W 88–41; W 79–75; W 70–58; W 78–59; W 87–75
2025	#1	First Round; Second Round; Sweet Sixteen; Elite Eight; Final Four; National Championship	#16 Tennessee Tech #9 Indiana #4 Maryland #2 Duke #1 Texas #2 UConn	W 108–48; W 64–53; W 71–67; W 54–50; W 74–57; L 59–82
2026	#1	First Round; Second Round; Sweet Sixteen; Elite Eight; Final Four; National Championship	#16 Southern #9 Southern Cal #4 Oklahoma #3 TCU #1 UConn #1 UCLA	W 103–34; W 101–61; W 94–68; W 78–52; W 62–48; L 51–79

=== NCAA Tournament Seeding History ===
The following lists where the Gamecocks have been seeded in the NCAA tournament.

Years →	'82	'86	'88	'89	'90	'91	'02	'03	'12	'13	'14	'15	'16	'17	'18	'19	'21	'22	'23	'24	'25	'26
Seeds →	3	7	8	6	5	7	3	5	5	4	1	1	1	1	2	4	1	1	1	1	1	1

=== National Championships ===
Year	Coach	Opponent	Score	Record
2017	Dawn Staley	Mississippi State Bulldogs	67–55	33–4
2022	Dawn Staley	UConn Huskies	64–49	35–2
2024	Dawn Staley	Iowa Hawkeyes	87–75	38–0
National Championships			3	

=== Conference Championships ===
Year	Overall Record	Conference Record	Coach	Conference
1986	18–11	9–1	Nancy Wilson	Metro
1988	23–11	10–2	Nancy Wilson	Metro
1989	23–7	10–2	Nancy Wilson	Metro
1990	24–9	13–1	Nancy Wilson	Metro
1991	22–9	12–2	Nancy Wilson	Metro
2014	29–5	14–2	Dawn Staley	SEC
2015	34–3	15–1	Dawn Staley	SEC
2016	33–2	16–0	Dawn Staley	SEC
2017	33–4	14–2	Dawn Staley	SEC
2020	32–1	16–0	Dawn Staley	SEC
2022	35–2	15–1	Dawn Staley	SEC
2023	36–1	16–0	Dawn Staley	SEC
2024	38–0	16–0	Dawn Staley	SEC
2025	35–4	15–1	Dawn Staley	SEC
2026	36–4	15–1	Dawn Staley	SEC

=== Conference Tournament Championships ===
South Carolina has played in the Southeastern Conference since the 1997–98 season. The Gamecocks have won 8 out of the last 10 tournament titles, all under Head Coach, Dawn Staley.

==== Metro Tournament Championships ====
Year	Seed	Round	Opponent	Result
1986	#1	Semifinals; Championship	(4) Virginia Tech (3) Cincinnati	W 67–54; W 67–48
1988	#1	Semifinals; Championship	(4) Southern Mississippi (3) Memphis	W 86–77; W 81–70
1989	#1	Semifinals; Championship	(5) Cincinnati (2) Southern Mississippi	W 63–60; W 92–65

==== SEC Tournament Championships ====
Year	Seed	Round	Opponent	Result
2015	#1	Quarterfinals; Semifinals; Championship	(9) Arkansas (4) LSU (2) Tennessee	W 58–36; W 74–54; W 62–46
2016	#1	Quarterfinals; Semifinals; Championship	(9) Auburn (5) Kentucky (2) Mississippi State	W 57–48; W 93–63; W 66–52
2017	#1	Quarterfinals; Semifinals; Championship	(8) Georgia (4) Kentucky (2) Mississippi State	W 72–48; W 89–77; W 59–49
2018	#2	Quarterfinals; Semifinals; Championship	(7) Tennessee (3) Georgia (1) Mississippi State	W 73–62; W 71–49; W 62–51
2020	#1	Quarterfinals; Semifinals; Championship	(9) Georgia (5) Arkansas (2) Mississippi State	W 89–56; W 90–64; W 76–62
2021	#2	Quarterfinals; Semifinals; Championship	(7) Alabama (3) Tennessee (4) Georgia	W 75–63; W 67–52; W 67–62
2023	#1	Quarterfinals; Semifinals; Championship	(8) Arkansas (4) Ole Miss (3) Tennessee	W 93–66; W 80–51; W 74–58
2024	#1	Quarterfinals; Semifinals; Championship	(9) Texas A&M (5)Tennessee (2) LSU	W 79–68; W 74–73; W 79–72
2025	#1	Quarterfinals; Semifinals; Championship	(8) Vanderbilt (5) Oklahoma (2) Texas	W 84–63; W 93–75; W 64–45

=== AIAW Division I ===
The Gamecocks made two appearances in the AIAW National Division I basketball tournament, with a combined record of 6–3.

Year	Round	Opponent	Result
1973	First round Consolation First round Consolation Second round Consolation third round	East Stroudsburg State; Lehman; UC Riverside; Kansas State	L, 59–66; W, 58–53; W, 49–36; L, 57–69
1980	First round Second round Quarterfinals; Semifinals; Third-place game	USC; Northwestern; Stephen F. Austin; Tennessee; Louisiana Tech	W, 81–60; W, 64–61; W, 63–56; L, 72–75; W, 77–69

== Attendances ==
Over the years, the Gamecocks have played in three different venues. At first games were played at the Blatt P.E. Center. Later games moved to the Carolina Coliseum, which saw the first sell out for a women's basketball game on January 17, 2002. That day, 12,168 fans turned out to see the South Carolina Gamecocks take on the Tennessee Lady Vols.

On November 22, 2002, the Gamecocks opened the newly constructed Colonial Life Arena (then known as Carolina Center; the arena's deal with Unum was signed a year later) with a $1 admission night, leading to a crowd 17,712 saw the Gamecocks defeat the arch-rival Clemson Lady Tigers. The first sell out with 18,000 in attendance occurred on February 8, 2016, against the University of Connecticut Huskies in a match up of the two top ranked teams in the country.

Crowds of over 16,000 at Colonial Life Arena for Women's Basketball games:

Date	Attendance	Opponent	Result
02–18–2024	18,478	Georgia	W 70–56
02–11–2024	18,167	UConn	W 83–65
02–21–2026	18,000	Ole Miss	W 85–48
02–16–2025	18,000	UConn	L 58–87
01–24–2025	18,000	LSU	W 66–56
01–19–2025	18,000	Oklahoma	W 101–60
01–12–2025	18,000	Texas	W 67–50
11–17–2024	18,000	East Carolina	W 95–44
03–03–2024	18,000	Tennessee	W 76–68
02–04–2024	18,000	Ole Miss	W 85–56
01–28–2024	18,000	Vanderbilt	W 91–74
02–26–2023	18,000	Georgia	W 73–63
02–12–2023	18,000	LSU	W 88–64
02–20–2022	18,000	Tennessee	W 67–53
03–01–2020	18,000	Texas A&M	W 60–52
02–10–2020	18,000	UConn	W 70–52
03–03–2019	18,000	Mississippi State	L 68–64
02–01–2018	18,000	UConn	L 58–83
02–26–2017	18,000	Kentucky	W 95–87
02–08–2016	18,000	UConn	L 66–54
11–22–2002	17,712	Clemson	W 72–58
12–29–2024	17,711	Wofford	W 93-47
01–11–2015	17,156	Kentucky	W 68–60
11–16–2023	16,820	Clemson	W 109–40
11–13–2015	16,815	Ohio State	W 88–80
02–20–2025	16,638	Arkansas	W 95-55
12–15–2024	16,501	USF	W 78–62
01–02–2015	16,465	Auburn	W 77–58
12–06–2015	16,429	Duke	W 66–55
02–28–2016	16,240	LSU	W 75–39
02–18–2016	16,186	Georgia	W 61–51
12–06–2023	16,181	Morgan State	W 104–38
11–12–2023	16,007	Maryland	W 114–76

South Carolina has led the nation in attendance every season since 2014–15, with the exception of 2020 which was limited due to COVID. The Gamecocks have averaged over 10,000 fans in 92 consecutive regular season home games.

Year	Games	Overall W–L	Overall Win Pct	NCAA W–L	NCAA Win Pct	Total Attendance (SEC/Nat Rank)	Avg Attendance (SEC/Nat Rank)
2014–15	16	16–0	1.000	2–0	1.000	196,684 (1st/1st)	12,293 (1st/1st)
2015–16	17	16–1	0.941	2–0	1.000	244,196 (1st/1st)	14,364 (1st/1st)
2016–17	16	15–1	0.938	2–0	1.000	196,431 (1st/1st)	12,277 (1st/1st)
2017–18	17	15–2	0.882	2–0	1.000	225,064 (1st/1st)	13,239 (1st/1st)
2018–19	17*	13–4	0.765	2–0	1.000	176,904 (1st/2nd)	10,406 (1st/1st)
2019–20	15	15–0	1.000	0–0		183,272 (1st/1st)	12,218 (1st/1st)
2020–21	11	10–1	0.909	0–0		Covid Attendance	Covid Average
2021–22	16	16–0	1.000	2–0	1.000	196,286 (1st/1st)	12,268 (1st/1st)
2022–23	17	17–0	1.000	2–0	1.000	220,010 (1st/1st)	12,941 (1st/1st)
2023–24	17	17–0	1.000	2–0	1.000	273,133 (1st/1st)	16,067 (1st/1st)
2024–25	17	16–1	0.941	2–0	1.000	279,423 (1st/1st)	16,436 (1st/1st)
Totals	194	184–10	0.948	18–0	1.000	2,468,019	13,443

* The 2019 NCAA Tournament games were played in Halton Arena, Charlotte, NC

- The 2021 NCAA Tournament games were played in the bubble at the Alamodome, San Antonio, TX

=== Notes ===
- Between losses to Texas A&M on February 10, 2013, and Connecticut on February 8, 2016, the Gamecocks won 45 consecutive games at home.
- As of June 20, 2021, the Gamecocks have drawn over 10,000 fans in 92 consecutive regular season home games
- Since their loss to NC State on December 3, 2021, the Gamecocks have won 59 consecutive home games.

== Notable players ==
=== Gamecocks drafted to the WNBA ===
Player	Draft	Seasons	Teams	style="width:30%;" Notes
Shannon Johnson	1999 – Orlando	11	(1999–2009) Orlando, Connecticut, San Antonio, Detroit, Houston, Seattle	All-Star: 1999, 2000, 2002, 2003 All-WNBA: 1999, 2000, 2002
Shaunzinski Gortman	2002 – 9th by Charlotte	5	(2002–2006) Last with the Seattle Storm	
Jocelyn Penn	2003 – 9th by Charlotte	2	(2003–2004) Last with the San Antonio	
Tiffany Mitchell	2016 – 9th by Indiana	10	(2016–Present) Indiana, Minnesota, Las Vegas	
Alaina Coates	2017 – 2nd by Chicago	5	(2017–2023) Chicago, Minnesota, Indiana, Atlanta, Washington, Phoenix, Las Vegas, Seattle	Champion: 2023
Allisha Gray	2017 – 4th by Dallas	9	(2017–present) Dallas, Atlanta	Rookie of the Year: 2017 All-Star: 2023, 2024, 2025, 2026 All-WNBA: 2025
Kaela Davis	2017 – 10th by Dallas	5	(2017–2024) Dallas, Atlanta, Chicago, Seattle, Phoenix, Chicago	
A'ja Wilson	2018 – 1st by Las Vegas	8	(2018–Present) Las Vegas	Champion: 2022, 2023, 2025 MVP: 2020, 2022, 2024, 2025, 2026 Finals MVP: 2023, 2025 Rookie of the Year: 2018 All-Star: 2018, 2021, 2022, 2023, 2024, 2025, 2026 All-WNBA: 2018–2026
Mikiah Herbert Harrigan	2020 – 6th by Minnesota	2	(2020–2024) Minnesota, Seattle, Dallas	
Tyasha Harris	2020 – 7th by Dallas	4	(2020–Present) Dallas, Connecticut, Dallas, Indiana	
Destanni Henderson	2022 – 20th by Indiana	2	(2022–2024) Indiana, Los Angeles, Phoenix, Atlanta	
Aliyah Boston	2023 – 1st by Indiana	3	(2023–Present) Indiana	Rookie of the Year: 2023 All-Star: 2023, 2024, 2025, 2026 All-WNBA: 2025
Laeticia Amihere	2023 – 8th by Atlanta	3	(2023–Present) Atlanta, Golden State	
Zia Cooke	2023 – 10th by Los Angeles	3	(2023–Present) Los Angeles, Seattle	
Brea Beal	2023 – 24th by Minnesota	1	(2023–2023) Minnesota, Las Vegas	
Victaria Saxton	2023 – 25th by Indiana	2	(2023–2024) Indiana	
Kamilla Cardoso	2024 – 3rd by Chicago	2	(2024–Present) Chicago	
Te-Hina Paopao	2025 – 18th by Atlanta	1	(2025–Present) Atlanta	
Bree Hall	2025 – 20th by Indiana	1	(2025–Present) Indiana	
Sania Feagin	2025 – 21st by Los Angeles	1	(2025–Present) Los Angeles, Portland	
Raven Johnson	2026 – 10th by Indiana	1	(2026–Present) Indiana	
Madina Okot	2026 – 13th by Atlanta	1	(2026–Present) Atlanta	
Ta'Niya Latson	2026 – 20th by Los Angeles	1	(2026–Present) Los Angeles, Las Vegas	

Also drafted:

- Teresa Geter – 2002 – 36th by Washington
- Petra Ujhelyi – 2003 – 16th by Phoenix
- Aleighsa Welch – 2015 – 22nd by Chicago

=== Retired jerseys ===
South Carolina has retired five jersey numbers.

No.	Player	Career
13	Martha Parker	1985–1989
14	Shannon Johnson	1992–1996
22	A'ja Wilson	2014–2018
25	Tiffany Mitchell	2012–2016
53	Sheila Foster	1978–1982

== Player and coach awards ==
=== National player awards ===
- First Team All-Americans

Brantley Southers − 1984
Martha Parker − 1989
Jocelyn Penn − 2003
Tiffany Mitchell – 2015
A'ja Wilson – 2016, 2017, 2018
Tyasha Harris – 2020
Aliyah Boston – 2021, 2022, 2023
Kamilla Cardoso − 2024

- All-Americans

Katrina Anderson − 1979
Sheila Foster − 1981, 1982
Brantley Southers − 1984, 1985
Mindy Ballou − 1984, 1985, 1986
Martha Parker − 1987, 1988, 1989
Marsha Williams − 1992, 1993
Shannon Johnson − 1996
Jocelyn Penn − 1996
Tiffany Mitchell – 2015
A'ja Wilson – 2016, 2017, 2018
Tyasha Harris – 2020
Aliyah Boston – 2020, 2021, 2022, 2023
Destanni Henderson − 2022
Zia Cooke − 2023
Kamilla Cardoso − 2024
Te-Hina Paopao − 2024
Joyce Edwards − 2026
Raven Johnson − 2026

Article Talk

- Wade Trophy

A'ja Wilson – 2018
Aliyah Boston – 2022

- Honda-Broderick Cup

Aliyah Boston – 2022

- Honda Sports Award

A'ja Wilson – 2018
Aliyah Boston – 2022

- Naismith College Player of the Year

A'ja Wilson – 2018
Aliyah Boston – 2022

- Naismith Defensive Player of the Year

Aliyah Boston – 2022, 2023

- John R. Wooden Award

A'ja Wilson – 2018
Aliyah Boston – 2022

- USBWA Women's National Player of the Year

A'ja Wilson – 2018
Aliyah Boston – 2022

- AP College Player of the Year

A'ja Wilson – 2018
Aliyah Boston – 2022

- Academic All-American of the Year

Aliyah Boston – 2021, 2022

- Lisa Leslie Award

A'ja Wilson − 2018
Aliyah Boston – 2020, 2021, 2022, 2023

- Ann Meyers Drysdale Award

Zia Cooke − 2023

- Dawn Staley Award

Tiffany Mitchell – 2015
Tyasha Harris – 2020

- USBWA National Freshman of the Year

Aliyah Boston – 2020

- WBCA Freshman of the Year

Aliyah Boston – 2020

- WBCA Defensive Player of the Year

Kamilla Cardoso – 2024

- NCAA basketball tournament Most Outstanding Player

A'ja Wilson
Aliyah Boston
Kamilla Cardoso

=== National coach awards ===
- Naismith College Coach of the Year

Dawn Staley – 2020, 2022, 2023, 2024

- WBCA National Coach of the Year

Dawn Staley – 2020, 2022, 2023, 2024

- AP Coach of the Year

Dawn Staley – 2020, 2024

- USBWA Women's National Coach of the Year

Dawn Staley – 2020, 2022, 2023, 2024

=== Conference awards ===
- SEC Coach of the Year

Susan Walvius – 2002
Dawn Staley – 2014, 2015*, 2016, 2020, 2022, 2023, 2024

- SEC Player of the Year

Tiffany Mitchell – 2014, 2015
A'ja Wilson – 2016, 2017, 2018
Aliyah Boston – 2022, 2023

- SEC Tournament MVP

Aleighsa Welch – 2015
Tiffany Mitchell – 2016
A'ja Wilson – 2017, 2018
Mikiah Herbert Harrigan – 2020
Aliyah Boston – 2021, 2023
Milaysia Fulwiley – 2024
Chole Kitts – 2025

- SEC Defensive Player of the Year

Ieasia Walker – 2013
A'ja Wilson – 2016, 2018
Aliyah Boston – 2020, 2021*, 2022, 2023
Kamilla Cardoso – 2024
Raven Johnson – 2026

- SEC Freshman of the Year

Alaina Coates – 2014
A'ja Wilson – 2015
Aliyah Boston – 2020

- SEC 6th Player of the Year

Alaina Coates – 2014*
Kamilla Cardoso – 2023
Milaysia Fulwiley – 2025

- SEC WBB Scholar Athlete of the Year

Aleighsa Welch – 2015

- Metro Coach of the Year

Nancy Wilson – 1985, 1991

- Metro Player of the Year

Brantley Southers – 1986
Martha Parker – 1988, 1989
Beth Hunt – 1990

- Metro Newcomer of the Year

Martha Parker – 1986
Schonna Banner – 1987

- Metro Tournament MVP

Brantley Southers – 1986
Martha Parker – 1988
Beth Hunt – 1989

* Denotes Co-Player / Co-Coach
