= 2019–20 Southeastern Conference women's basketball season =

2019–20 SEC Women's Basketball Season
- League: NCAA Division I
- Sport: Basketball
- Teams: 14

WNBA Draft
- Top draft pick: Mikiah Herbert Harrigan
- Picked by: Minnesota Lynx

Regular Season
- 2020 SEC Champions: South Carolina

Tournament
- Champions: South Carolina
- Runners-up: Mississippi State
- Finals MVP: Mikiah Herbert Harrigan (South Carolina)

Basketball seasons
- ← 2018–19 2020–21 →

2019–20 SEC women's basketball standings
	Conf.				Overall
Team	W		L	PCT	W		L	PCT
No. 1 South Carolina †	16	–	0	1.000	32	–	1	.970
No. 9 Mississippi State	13	–	3	.813	27	–	6	.818
No. 24 Arkansas	10	–	6	.625	24	–	8	.750
No. 16 Kentucky	10	–	6	.625	22	–	8	.733
No. 19 Texas A&M	10	–	6	.625	22	–	8	.733
Tennessee	10	–	6	.625	21	–	10	.677
LSU	9	–	7	.563	20	–	10	.667
Alabama	8	–	8	.500	18	–	12	.600
Georgia	7	–	9	.438	17	–	14	.548
Florida	6	–	10	.375	15	–	15	.500
Missouri	5	–	11	.313	9	–	22	.290
Vanderbilt	4	–	12	.250	14	–	16	.467
Auburn	4	–	12	.250	11	–	18	.379
Ole Miss	0	–	16	.000	7	–	23	.233
† 2020 SEC tournament winner Rankings from AP poll

The 2019–20 SEC women's basketball season began with practices in October 2019, followed by the start of the 2019–20 NCAA Division I women's basketball season in November. Conference play started in early January 2020 and concluded in February, to be followed by the 2020 SEC women's basketball tournament at the Bon Secours Wellness Arena in Greenville, South Carolina, in March.

== Pre-season ==
=== Pre-season team predictions ===
	Media	Coaches
1.	South Carolina	Texas A&M
2.	Texas A&M	South Carolina
3.	Mississippi State	
4.	Kentucky	
5.	Arkansas	
6.	Tennessee	LSU
7.	Auburn	Tennessee
8.	LSU	Auburn
9.	Missouri	
10.	Georgia	
11.	Alabama	
12.	Florida	Vanderbilt
13.	Ole Miss	
14.	Vanderbilt	Florida

=== Pre-season All-SEC teams ===
Media	Coaches
**Chennedy Carter Texas A&M**	**Carter**
Chelsea Dungee Arkansas	Dungee
Rhyne Howard Kentucky	Howard
Ayana Mitchell LSU	Mitchell
Tyasha Harris South Carolina	Harris
	Jordan Danberry Mississippi State
	Amber Smith Missouri
	Rennia Davis Tennessee

- Coaches select eight players
- Player in bold is choice for SEC Player of the Year

== Head coaches ==
Note: Stats shown are before the beginning of the season. Overall and SEC records are from time at current school.

Team	Head coach	Previous job	Seasons at school	Overall record	SEC record	NCAA Tournaments	NCAA Final Fours	NCAA Championships
Alabama	Kristy Curry	Texas Tech	7th	98–96	76–85	9	1	0
Arkansas	Mike Neighbors	Washington	3rd	25–33	9–23	3	1	0
Auburn	Terri Williams-Flournoy	Georgetown	8th	124–101	44–70	5	0	0
Florida	Cameron Newbauer	Belmont	3rd	19–42	6–26	2	0	0
Georgia	Joni Taylor	Georgia (asst.)	5th	81–44	37–27	2	0	0
Kentucky	Matthew Mitchell	Morehead State	13th	281–125	119–69	9	0	0
LSU	Nikki Fargas	UCLA	9th	148–106	66–60	8	0	0
Mississippi State	Vic Schaefer	Texas A&M (assoc. HC)	8th	194–56	76–36	5	2	0
Missouri	Robin Pingeton	Illinois State	10th	171–119	57–51	6	0	0
Ole Miss	Yolett McPhee-McCuin	Jacksonville	2nd	9–22	3–13	0	0	0
South Carolina	Dawn Staley	Temple	12th	273–97	122–52	14	2	1
Tennessee	Kellie Harper	Missouri State	1st	0-0	0-0	0	0	0
Texas A&M	Gary Blair	Arkansas	17th	784–322	74–36	24	2	1
Vanderbilt	Stephanie White	Indiana Fever	4th	28–63	13–50	0	0	0

== Weekly rankings ==
Legend: ██ Increase in ranking. ██ Decrease in ranking. ██ Not ranked the previous week. RV=Received votes. NR=No rank/vote.
		Pre	Wk 2	Wk 3	Wk 4	Wk 5	Wk 6	Wk 7	Wk 8	Wk 9	Wk 10	Wk 11	Wk 12	Wk 13	Wk 14	Wk 15	Wk 16	Wk 17	Wk 18	Final
Alabama	AP																			
Alabama	C																			
Arkansas	AP	22	23	20	25	23	21	21	20	20	21	23								
Arkansas	C	22	18	24	23	20	20	20	20	21	23									
Auburn	AP	RV	NR																	
Auburn	C																			
Florida	AP																			
Florida	C																			
Georgia	AP																			
Georgia	C																			
Kentucky	AP	13	13	14	15	14	15	14	13	13	14	11								
Kentucky	C	16	14	14	14	11	13	13	13	14	11									
LSU	AP	RV	NR			25	NR													
LSU	C	NR	NR	RV																
Mississippi State	AP	10	10	10	10	10	15	15	15	15	13	10								
Mississippi State	C	8	8	8	8	14	15	14	14	12	9									
Missouri	AP																			
Missouri	C	RV	NR																	
Ole Miss	AP																			
Ole Miss	C																			
South Carolina	AP	8	6	5	5	6	5	5	4	4	4	1								
South Carolina	C	10	6	6	7	6	6	5	5	5	2									
Tennessee	AP	RV	RV	23T	20	17	23	23	22	22	23	24								
Tennessee	C	RV	RV	25	19	24	24	24	23	24	25									
Texas A&M	AP	6	5	6	6	12	11	11	11	11	10	12								
Texas A&M	C	7	7	7	13	13	12	12	12	10	12									
Vanderbilt	AP																			
Vanderbilt	C																			

== Conference matrix ==
	Alabama	Arkansas	Auburn	Florida	Georgia	Kentucky	LSU	Miss. State	Missouri	Ole Miss	S. Carolina	Tennessee	Texas A&M	Vanderbilt
vs. Alabama	–	0–0	0–1	0–0	0–0	1–0	1–0	0–0	0–0	0–0	1–0	0–0	0–0	0–0
vs. Arkansas	0–0	–	0–1	0–0	0–0	0–0	0–0	0–0	0–1	0–0	0–0	0–1	1–0	0–0
vs. Auburn	1–0	1–0	–	1–0	0–0	0–0	0–0	0–0	0–0	0–0	0–0	0–0	0–0	1–0
vs. Florida	0–0	0–0	0–1	–	0–0	1–0	0–0	1–0	0–0	0–0	0–0	0–0	0–0	0–1
vs. Georgia	0–0	0–0	0–0	0–0	–	0–0	0–0	1–0	0–0	0–1	0–0	0–0	0–0	1–0
vs. Kentucky	0–1	0–0	0–0	0–1	0–0	–	0–0	0–0	0–0	0–0	1–0	0–1	0–1	0–0
vs. LSU	0–1	0–0	0–0	0–0	0–0	0–0	–	0–0	1–0	0–1	0–0	0–0	0–0	0–0
vs. Miss. State	0–0	0–0	0–0	0–1	0–1	0–0	0–0	–	0–1	0–0	0–0	0–0	0–0	0–0
vs. Missouri	0–0	1–0	0–0	0–0	0–0	0–0	0–1	1–0	–	0–0	0–0	1–0	0–0	0–0
vs. Ole Miss	0–0	0–0	0–0	0–0	1–0	0–0	1–0	0–0	0-0	–	0–0	1–0	1–0	0–0
vs. South Carolina	0–1	0–1	0–0	0–0	0–0	0–1	0–0	0–0	0–0	0–0	–	0–0	0–0	0–1
vs. Tennessee	0–0	0–0	0–0	0–0	0–1	1–0	0–0	0–0	0–1	0–1	0–0	–	0–0	0–0
vs. Texas A&M	0–0	0–1	0–0	0–0	0–0	0–0	1–0	0–0	0-0	0–1	0–0	0–0	–	0–0
vs. Vanderbilt	0–0	0–0	0–1	1–0	0–1	0–0	0–0	0–0	0–0	0–0	1–0	0–0	0–0	–
Total	1–3	2–2	0–4	2–2	1–3	3–1	3–1	3–0	1–3	0–4	4–0	3–1	2–1	2–2

== Postseason ==
=== SEC tournament ===
- March 4–8 at the Bon Secours Wellness Arena in Greenville, South Carolina. Teams are seeded by conference record, with ties broken by record between the tied teams followed by record against the regular-season champion.

**2020 SEC women's basketball tournament seeds and results**
Seed	School	Conf.	Over.	Tiebreaker	First Round March 4	Second Round March 5	Quarterfinals March 6	Semifinals March 7	Championship March 8
1	‡†**South Carolina**	16–0	32–1		Bye	Bye	vs. #9 Georgia; **W, 89–56**	vs. #5 Arkansas; **W, 90–64**	vs. #2 Mississippi State; **W, 76–62**
2	†**Mississippi State**	13–3	27–6		Bye	Bye	vs. #7 LSU; **W, 79–49**	vs. #3 Kentucky; **W, 77–59**	vs. #1 South Carolina; **L, 62–76**
3	†**Kentucky**	10–6	22–7	1–0 vs. TAMU, 1–0 vs. TENN, 0–1 vs. ARK	Bye	Bye	vs. #6 Tennessee; **W, 86–65**	vs. #2 Mississippi State; **L, 59–77**	
4	†**Texas A&M**	10–6	22–8	1–0 vs. TENN, 1–0 vs. ARK, 0–1 vs. UK	Bye	Bye	vs. #5 Arkansas; **L, 66–67**		
5	#**Arkansas**	10–6	24–8	1–0 vs. TENN, 1–0 vs. UK, 0–1 vs. TAMU	Bye	vs. #13 Auburn; **W, 90–66**	vs. #4 Texas A&M; **W, 67–66**	vs. #1 South Carolina; **L, 64–90**	
6	#**Tennessee**	10–6	21–10	0–1 vs. UK, 0–1 vs. TAMU, 0–1 vs. ARK	Bye	vs. #11 Missouri; **W, 64–51**	vs. #3 Kentucky; **L, 65–86**		
7	#**LSU**	9–7	20–10		Bye	vs. #10 Florida; **W, 73–59**	vs. #2 Mississippi State; **L, 49–79**		
8	#**Alabama**	8–8	18–12		Bye	vs. #9 Georgia; **L, 61–68**			
9	#**Georgia**	7–9	17–14		Bye	vs. #8 Alabama; **W, 68–61**	vs. #1 South Carolina; **L, 56–89**		
10	#**Florida**	7–10	15–15		Bye	vs. #7 LSU; **L, 59–73**			
11	**Missouri**	5–11	9–22		vs. #14 Ole Miss; **W, 64–53**	vs. #6 Tennessee; **L, 51–64**			
12	**Vanderbilt**	4–12	14–16		vs. #13 Auburn; **L, 67–77**				
13	**Auburn**	4–12	11–18		vs. #12 Vanderbilt; **W, 77–67**	vs. #5 Arkansas; **L, 66–90**			
14	**Ole Miss**	0–16	7–23		vs. #11 Missouri; **L, 53–64**				
‡ – SEC regular season champions, and tournament No. 1 seed. † – Received a double-Bye in the conference tournament. # – Received a single-Bye in the conference tournament. Overall records include all games played in the tournament.
