= 2019–20 Tennessee Lady Volunteers basketball team =

Intercollegiate basketball season

2019–20 Tennessee Lady Volunteers basketball
- Conference: Southeastern Conference
- Record: 21–10 (10–6 SEC)
- Head coach: Kellie Harper (1st season)
- Assistant coaches: Lacey Goldwire; Jon Harper; Jennifer Sullivan
- Home arena: Thompson–Boling Arena

2019–20 SEC women's basketball standings
	Conf.				Overall
Team	W		L	PCT	W		L	PCT
No. 1 South Carolina †	16	–	0	1.000	32	–	1	.970
No. 9 Mississippi State	13	–	3	.813	27	–	6	.818
No. 24 Arkansas	10	–	6	.625	24	–	8	.750
No. 16 Kentucky	10	–	6	.625	22	–	8	.733
No. 19 Texas A&M	10	–	6	.625	22	–	8	.733
Tennessee	10	–	6	.625	21	–	10	.677
LSU	9	–	7	.563	20	–	10	.667
Alabama	8	–	8	.500	18	–	12	.600
Georgia	7	–	9	.438	17	–	14	.548
Florida	6	–	10	.375	15	–	15	.500
Missouri	5	–	11	.313	9	–	22	.290
Vanderbilt	4	–	12	.250	14	–	16	.467
Auburn	4	–	12	.250	11	–	18	.379
Ole Miss	0	–	16	.000	7	–	23	.233
† 2020 SEC tournament winner Rankings from AP poll

The 2019–20 Tennessee Lady Volunteers basketball team represented the University of Tennessee in the 2019–20 college basketball season. Led by former Lady Vol Kellie Harper, entering her first year as head coach, the team played their games at Thompson–Boling Arena and were members of the Southeastern Conference.

In the December 12 win against Colorado State, junior Rennia Davis scored her 1,000th career point. She finished the night with 1,007, and the 45th Lady Vol to surpass the mark.

The Lady Vols ended the regular season and received a first-round bye in the SEC tournament, defeated Missouri in the second round, but lost to Kentucky in the quarterfinals.

== Previous season ==
The 2018–19 team finished the season 19–13, 7–9 for a seventh-place tie in SEC play. They lost in the quarterfinals of the SEC tournament to Mississippi State. They received an at-large bid to the NCAA tournament where they lost to UCLA in the first round. At the completion of the season, Holly Warlick was fired as head coach. Harper, who was a point guard during Tennessee's three-peat from 1996 to 1998, was hired as her replacement on April 8, 2019.

== Preseason ==
=== SEC media poll ===
The SEC media poll was released on October 15, 2019, with Tennessee predicted to finish sixth.

Media poll
Predicted finish	Team
1	South Carolina
2	Texas A&M
3	Mississippi State
4	Kentucky
5	Arkansas
6	Tennessee
7	Auburn
8	LSU
9	Missouri
10	Georgia
11	Alabama
12	Florida
13	Ole Miss
14	Vanderbilt

=== Preseason All-SEC team ===
The Lady Vols had one player selected to the preseason all-SEC team, junior guard-forward Rennia Davis, who was selected for second team.

== Roster ==
2019–20 Tennessee Lady Volunteers women's basketball team
Players
Coaches

Pos.	#	Name	Height	Year	Previous school	Hometown
G/F	0	Rennia Davis	6 ft 2 in (1.88 m)	Jr	Jean Ribault HS	Jacksonville, FL
F	5	Kamera Harris	6 ft 3 in (1.91 m)	Sr	Dutchtown HS	Hampton, GA
G	10	Jessie Rennie	5 ft 6 in (1.68 m)	Fr	Bendigo Senior Secondary College	Bendigo, AUS
C	11	Kasiyahna Kushkituah	6 ft 4 in (1.93 m)	Jr	St. Francis HS	Atlanta, GA
G/F	12	Rae Burrell	6 ft 1 in (1.85 m)	So	Liberty HS	Henderson, NV
G	13	Jazmine Massengill	6 ft 0 in (1.83 m)	So	Hamilton Heights Christian Academy	Chattanooga, TN
G	14	Zaay Green (injured)	6 ft 0 in (1.83 m)	So	Duncanville HS	Duncanville, TX
F	15	Jaiden McCoy	6 ft 3 in (1.91 m)	RS Jr	Northwest Florida State	Knoxville, TN
C	20	Tamari Key	6 ft 5 in (1.96 m)	Fr	Cary HS	Cary, NC
F	21	Lou Brown	6 ft 3 in (1.91 m)	Sr	Australian Institute of Sport	Melbourne, AUS
G	25	Jordan Horston	6 ft 2 in (1.88 m)	Fr	Columbus Africentric Early College	Columbus, OH
C	31	Emily Saunders	6 ft 5 in (1.96 m)	Fr	Wyoming East HS	Mullens, WV

Head coach

- Kellie Harper (Tennessee)

Assistant coach(es)

- Lacey Goldwire (East Central)
- Jon Harper (Auburn)
- Jennifer Sullivan (Memphis)

Legend

- (C) Team captain
- (S) Suspended
- (I) Ineligible
- (W) Walk-on
- Injured
- Current redshirt

Roster

== Rankings ==
Ranking movements Legend: ██ Increase in ranking ██ Decrease in ranking RV = Received votes
	Week																				
Poll	Pre	1	2	3	4	5	6	7	8	9	10	11	12	13	14	15	16	17	18	19	Final
AP	RV	RV	RV	23	20	17	23	23	22	22	23	24	23	22	23	25	RV	RV			
Coaches	RV	RV		25	19	24	24	24	23	24	25	22	23	25	RV	RV					

^Coaches' Poll did not release a second poll at the same time as the AP.

== Schedule ==
Date time, TV	Rank^{#}	Opponent^{#}	Result	Record	High points	High rebounds	High assists	Site (attendance) city, state
Exhibition
10/29/2019*; 7:00 pm, SECN+		Carson–Newman	W 70–44		20 – Davis	9 – Burrell	2 – Tied	Thompson–Boling Arena (3,335); Knoxville, TN
Regular season
11/5/2019*; 7:00 pm, MYVLT		at ETSU	W 72–68	1–0	17 – Green	12 – Key	6 – Horston	Freedom Hall Civic Center (5,881); Johnson City, TN
11/7/2019*; 7:00 pm, SECN+		Central Arkansas	W 63–36	2–0	17 – Horston	5 – Tied	3 – Tied	Thompson–Boling Arena (7,278); Knoxville, TN
11/11/2019*; 7:00 pm, ESPN2		at No. 15 Notre Dame	W 74–63	3–0	33 – Davis	13 – Massengill	9 – Massengill	Edmund P. Joyce Center (7,801); South Bend, IN
11/14/2019*; 7:00 pm, SECN+		Tennessee State	W 73–43	4–0	14 – Burrell	10 – Davis	3 – Tied	Thompson–Boling Arena (7,213); Knoxville, TN
11/19/2019*; 7:00 pm, SECN+	No. 23	Stetson	W 73–46	5–0	15 – Davis	11 – Burrell	7 – Horston	Thompson–Boling Arena (7,246); Knoxville, TN
11/26/2019*; 7:00 pm, SECN+	No. 20	Arkansas–Pine Bluff	W 92–51	6–0	17 – Davis	11 – Davis	5 – Horston	Thompson–Boling Arena (7,521); Knoxville, TN
12/1/2019*; 2:00 pm, SECN	No. 20	Air Force	W 81–54	7–0	18 – Davis	9 – Davis	6 – Massengill	Thompson–Boling Arena (8,032); Knoxville, TN
12/8/2019*; 2:00 pm, ESPN2	No. 17	Texas; Big 12/SEC Women's Challenge	L 60–66	7–1	15 – Davis	9 – Kushkituah	5 – Horston	Thompson–Boling Arena (9,371); Knoxville, TN
12/11/2019*; 7:00 pm, SECN+	No. 23	Colorado State	W 79–41	8–1	23 – Davis	14 – Horston	6 – Horston	Thompson–Boling Arena (7,024); Knoxville, TN
12/18/2019*; 10:00 pm, P12N	No. 23	at No. 1 Stanford; Rivalry	L 51–78	8–2	14 – Davis	7 – Kushkituah	2 – Tied	Maples Pavilion (4,676); Stanford, CA
12/21/2019*; 5:00 pm, Pluto TV	No. 23	at Portland State	W 88–61	9–2	21 – Burrell	13 – Davis	10 – Massengill	Viking Pavilion (1,748); Portland, OR
12/29/2019*; 2:00 pm, SECN+	No. 22	Howard	W 88–38	10–2	18 – Burrell	12 – Burrell	6 – Horston	Thompson–Boling Arena (9,269); Knoxville, TN
1/2/2020; 5:00 pm, SECN	No. 22	Missouri	W 77–66	11–2 (1–0)	19 – Davis	12 – Davis	12 – Massengill	Thompson–Boling Arena (7,814); Knoxville, TN
1/5/2020; 4:00 pm, ESPN2	No. 22	at No. 13 Kentucky; Rivalry	L 76–80	11–3 (1–1)	27 – Davis	8 – Kushkituah	9 – Horston	Memorial Coliseum (5,516); Lexington, KY
1/9/2020; 8:00 pm, SECN+	No. 23	at Ole Miss	W 84–28	12–3 (2–1)	17 – Davis	10 – Key	7 – Horston	The Pavilion at Ole Miss (1,373); Oxford, MS
1/12/2020; 1:00 pm, SECN	No. 23	Georgia	W 73–56	13–3 (3–1)	17 – Davis	7 – Massengill	7 – Horston	Thompson–Boling Arena (10,036); Knoxville, TN
1/16/2020; 6:00 pm, SECN+	No. 24	at Florida	W 78–50	14–3 (4–1)	18 – Davis	9 – Key	8 – Massengill	O'Connell Center (1,629); Gainesville, FL
1/20/2020; 7:00 pm, SECN	No. 23	Alabama	W 65–63	15–3 (5–1)	19 – Horston	10 – Key	4 – Horston	Thompson–Boling Arena (8,537); Knoxville, TN
1/23/2020*; 7:00 pm, ESPN	No. 23	at No. 3 UConn; Rivalry	L 45–60	15–4	16 – Davis	8 – Davis	5 – Massengill	XL Center (13,659); Hartford, CT
1/26/2020; 1:00 pm, SECN	No. 23	LSU	W 63–58	16–4 (6–1)	30 – Davis	8 – Davis	9 – Horston	Thompson–Boling Arena (10,230); Knoxville, TN
1/30/2020; 9:00 pm, SECN	No. 22	at Vanderbilt; Rivalry	W 78–69	17–4 (7–1)	22 – Davis	7 – Davis	5 – Horston	Memorial Gymnasium (3,429); Nashville, TN
2/2/2020; 1:00 pm, ESPN2	No. 22	at No. 1 South Carolina	L 48–69	17–5 (7–2)	18 – Davis	10 – Davis	3 – Horston	Colonial Life Arena (13,735); Columbia, SC
2/6/2020; 6:30 pm, SECN	No. 23	No. 8 Mississippi State	L 55–72	17–6 (7–3)	20 – Burrell	10 – Burrell	3 – Horston	Thompson–Boling Arena (8,124); Knoxville, TN
2/13/2020; 7:30 pm, SECN+	No. 25	at LSU	L 65–75	17–7 (7–4)	19 – Davis	7 – Horston	3 – Massengill	Maravich Center (1,966); Baton Rouge, LA
2/16/2020; 3:00 pm, ESPN2	No. 25	No. 16 Texas A&M	L 71–73	17–8 (7–5)	19 – Burrell	7 – Burrell	6 – Tied	Thompson–Boling Arena (12,738); Knoxville, TN
2/20/2020; 7:00 pm, SECN		at No. 22 Arkansas	L 75–83	17–9 (7–6)	21 – Burrell	9 – Burrell	4 – Horston	Bud Walton Arena (3,023); Fayetteville, AR
2/23/2020; 12:00 pm, ESPN2		No. Rivalry Vanderbilt	W 67–63	18–9 (8–6)	18 – Davis	10 – Tied	5 – Horston	Thompson–Boling Arena (9,636); Knoxville, TN
2/27/2020; 7:00 pm, SECN+		Ole Miss	W 77–66	19–9 (9–6)	19 – Davis	11 – Davis	7 – Horston	Thompson–Boling Arena (8,255); Knoxville, TN
3/1/2020; 3:05 pm, SECN		at Auburn	W 56–55	20–9 (10–6)	22 – Davis	10 – Davis	5 – Massengill	Auburn Arena (2,410); Auburn, AL
SEC tournament
3/5/2020; 8:30 pm, SECN	(6)	vs. (11) Missouri; Second Round	W 64–51	21–9	16 – Burrell	9 – Davis	2 – Tied	Bon Secours Wellness Arena (4,215); Greenville, SC
3/6/2020; 8:30 pm, SECN	(6)	vs. (3) No. 16 Kentucky; Quarterfinals / Rivalry	L 65–86	21–10	24 – Horston	7 – Brown	5 – Massengill	Bon Secours Wellness Arena (5,749); Greenville, SC
*Non-conference game. ^{#}Rankings from AP Poll. (#) Tournament seedings in parentheses. All times are in Eastern Time. 2019–20 Schedule
