= 2020 SEC women's basketball tournament =

- Classification: Division I
- Season: 2019–20
- Teams: 14
- Site: Bon Secours Wellness Arena; Greenville, South Carolina
- Champions: South Carolina (5th title)
- Winning coach: Dawn Staley (5th title)
- MVP: Mikiah Herbert Harrigan (South Carolina)
- Television: SEC Network, ESPNU, ESPN2

2019–20 SEC women's basketball standings
	Conf.				Overall
Team	W		L	PCT	W		L	PCT
No. 1 South Carolina †	16	–	0	1.000	32	–	1	.970
No. 9 Mississippi State	13	–	3	.813	27	–	6	.818
No. 24 Arkansas	10	–	6	.625	24	–	8	.750
No. 16 Kentucky	10	–	6	.625	22	–	8	.733
No. 19 Texas A&M	10	–	6	.625	22	–	8	.733
Tennessee	10	–	6	.625	21	–	10	.677
LSU	9	–	7	.563	20	–	10	.667
Alabama	8	–	8	.500	18	–	12	.600
Georgia	7	–	9	.438	17	–	14	.548
Florida	6	–	10	.375	15	–	15	.500
Missouri	5	–	11	.313	9	–	22	.290
Vanderbilt	4	–	12	.250	14	–	16	.467
Auburn	4	–	12	.250	11	–	18	.379
Ole Miss	0	–	16	.000	7	–	23	.233
† 2020 SEC tournament winner Rankings from AP poll

The 2020 Southeastern Conference women's basketball tournament was a postseason women's basketball tournament for the Southeastern Conference held at the Bon Secours Wellness Arena in Greenville, South Carolina, United States through March 8, 2020. The South Carolina Gamecocks won the tournament.

== Seeds ==
Seed	School	Conference record	Overall record	Tiebreaker
1	South Carolina^{‡†}	16–0	32–1	
2	Mississippi State^{†}	13–3	27–6	
3	Kentucky^{†}	10–6	22–8	1–0 vs. TAMU, 1–0 vs. UT, 0–1 vs. ARK
4	Texas A&M^{†}	10–6	22–8	1–0 vs. UT, 1–0 vs. Ark, 0–1 vs. UK
5	Arkansas^{#}	10–6	24–7	1–0 vs. UT, 1–0 vs. UK, 0–1 vs. TAMU
6	Tennessee^{#}	10–6	22–10	0–1 vs. UK, 0–1 vs. TAMU, 0–1 vs. ARK
7	LSU^{#}	9–7	20–10	
8	Alabama^{#}	8–8	18–12	
9	Georgia^{#}	7–9	17–14	
10	Florida^{#}	6–10	15–15	
11	Missouri	5–11	9–22	
12	Vanderbilt	4–12	14–16	1–0 vs. Auburn
13	Auburn	4–12	11–18	0–1 vs. Vanderbilt
14	Ole Miss	0–16	7–23	
‡ – SEC regular season champions, and tournament No. 1 seed. † – Received a double-bye in the conference tournament. # – Received a single-bye in the conference tournament. Overall records include all games played in the SEC Tournament.

== Schedule ==
Game	Time*	Matchup^{#}	Television	Attendance
First round – Wednesday, March 4
1	11:00 am	#12 Vanderbilt 67 vs. #13 Auburn 77	SEC Network	5,589
2	1:30 pm	#11 Missouri 64 vs. #14 Ole Miss 53	SEC Network	5,589
Second round – Thursday, March 5
3	Noon	#8 Alabama 61 vs. #9 Georgia 68	SEC Network	3,615
4	2:30 pm	#13 Auburn 68 vs. #5 Arkansas 90	SEC Network	3,615
5	6:00 pm	#7 LSU 73 vs. #10 Florida 59	SEC Network	4,215
6	8:30 pm	#6 Tennessee 64 vs. #11 Missouri 51	SEC Network	4,215
Quarterfinals – Friday, March 6
7	Noon	#1 South Carolina 89 vs. #9 Georgia 56	SEC Network	6,710
8	2:30 pm	#4 Texas A&M 66 vs. #5 Arkansas 67	SEC Network	6,710
9	6:00 pm	#2 Mississippi State 79 vs. #7 LSU 49	SEC Network	5,749
10	8:30 pm	#3 Kentucky 86 vs. #6 Tennessee 65	SEC Network	5,749
Semifinals – Saturday, March 7
11	5:00 pm	#1 South Carolina 90 vs #5 Arkansas 64	ESPNU	9,244
12	7:30 pm	#2 Mississippi State 77 vs #3 Kentucky 59	ESPNU	9,244
Championship – Sunday, March 8
13	2:00 pm	#1 South Carolina 76 vs #2 Mississippi State 62	ESPN2	9,971
*Game times in ET. # – Rankings denote tournament seed

== Bracket ==
First round Wednesday, March 4 SECN
12	Vanderbilt	67
13	Auburn	77
11	Missouri	64
14	Ole Miss	53

Second round Thursday, March 5 SECN
8	Alabama	61
9	Georgia	68
5	Arkansas	90
13	Auburn	66
7	LSU	73
10	Florida	59
6	Tennessee	64
11	Missouri	51

Quarterfinals; Friday, March 6 SECN
1	South Carolina	89
9	Georgia	56
4	Texas A&M	66
5	Arkansas	67
2	Mississippi State	79
7	LSU	49
3	Kentucky	86
6	Tennessee	65

Semifinals; Saturday, March 7 ESPNU
1	South Carolina	90
5	Arkansas	64
2	Mississippi State	77
3	Kentucky	59

Championship; Sunday, March 8 ESPN2
1	South Carolina	76
2	Mississippi State	62

* denotes overtime period

== See also ==
- 2020 SEC men's basketball tournament
