= 2019–20 Georgia Lady Bulldogs basketball team =

Intercollegiate basketball season

2019–20 Georgia Lady Bulldogs basketball
- Conference: Southeastern Conference
- Record: 17–14 (7–9 SEC)
- Head coach: Joni Taylor (5th season)
- Assistant coaches: Karen Lange; Chelsea Newton; Robert Mosley
- Home arena: Stegeman Coliseum

2019–20 SEC women's basketball standings
	Conf.				Overall
Team	W		L	PCT	W		L	PCT
No. 1 South Carolina †	16	–	0	1.000	32	–	1	.970
No. 9 Mississippi State	13	–	3	.813	27	–	6	.818
No. 24 Arkansas	10	–	6	.625	24	–	8	.750
No. 16 Kentucky	10	–	6	.625	22	–	8	.733
No. 19 Texas A&M	10	–	6	.625	22	–	8	.733
Tennessee	10	–	6	.625	21	–	10	.677
LSU	9	–	7	.563	20	–	10	.667
Alabama	8	–	8	.500	18	–	12	.600
Georgia	7	–	9	.438	17	–	14	.548
Florida	6	–	10	.375	15	–	15	.500
Missouri	5	–	11	.313	9	–	22	.290
Vanderbilt	4	–	12	.250	14	–	16	.467
Auburn	4	–	12	.250	11	–	18	.379
Ole Miss	0	–	16	.000	7	–	23	.233
† 2020 SEC tournament winner Rankings from AP poll

The 2019–20 Georgia Lady Bulldogs basketball team represented the University of Georgia during the 2019–20 NCAA Division I women's basketball season. The Lady Bulldogs, led by fifth-year head coach Joni Taylor, played their home games at the Stegeman Coliseum and competed as members of the Southeastern Conference (SEC).

== Preseason ==
=== SEC media poll ===
The SEC media poll was released on October 15, 2019.

Media poll
Predicted finish	Team
1	South Carolina
2	Texas A&M
3	Mississippi State
4	Kentucky
5	Arkansas
6	Tennessee
7	Auburn
8	LSU
9	Missouri
10	Georgia
11	Alabama
12	Florida
13	Ole Miss
14	Vanderbilt

== Roster ==
2019–20 Georgia Lady Bulldogs women's basketball team
Players
Coaches

Pos.	#	Name	Height	Year	Previous school	Hometown
G	1	Chloe Chapman	5 ft 8 in (1.73 m)	Fr	Our Lady of Good Counsel HS	Mitchellville, MD
G	2	Gabby Connally	5 ft 6 in (1.68 m)	Jr	Louis D. Brandeis HS	San Antonio, TX
F	3	Stephanie Paul	5 ft 10 in (1.78 m)	Sr	Community School of Naples	Naples, FL
G	4	Mikayla Coombs	5 ft 9 in (1.75 m)	Jr	Wesleyan School	Buford, GA
G	10	Caitlin Hose	5 ft 8 in (1.73 m)	So	Hazel Green HS	Hazel Green, AL
G	11	Maya Caldwell	5 ft 10 in (1.78 m)	Jr	Davidson Day School	Charlotte, NC
G	12	Kaila Hubbard	5 ft 9 in (1.75 m)	So	Holy Innocents' Episcopal School	Jonesboro, GA
C	14	Jenna Staiti	6 ft 4 in (1.93 m)	RS Jr	West Forsyth HS	Cumming, GA
F	20	Jordan Isaacs	6 ft 0 in (1.83 m)	Fr	St. Francis School	Alpharetta, GA
G	21	Shaniya Jones	5 ft 5 in (1.65 m)	So	Wesleyan Christian Academy	High Point, NC
F	22	Malury Bates	6 ft 2 in (1.88 m)	RS So	William Fleming HS	Roanoke, VA
G	23	Que Morrison	5 ft 7 in (1.7 m)	Jr	McEachern HS	Riverdale, GA
G	25	Ari Henderson	5 ft 7 in (1.7 m)	Sr	Chamblee Charter HS	Stone Mountain, GA
F	35	Javyn Nicholson	6 ft 2 in (1.88 m)	Fr	Collins Hill HS	Lawrenceville, GA

Head coach

- Joni Taylor (Alabama)

Assistant coach(es)

- Karen Lange (Iowa)
- Chelsea Newton (Rutgers)
- Robert Mosley (Miles)

Legend

- (C) Team captain
- (S) Suspended
- (I) Ineligible
- (W) Walk-on
- Injured
- Current redshirt

Roster

== Schedule ==
Date time, TV	Rank^{#}	Opponent^{#}	Result	Record	High points	High rebounds	High assists	Site (attendance) city, state
Non-conference regular season
November 7, 2019*; 7:00 pm, SECN+		Kennesaw State	W 80–65	1–0	28 – Connally	11 – Staiti	9 – Connally	Stegeman Coliseum (2,458); Athens, GA
November 13, 2019*; 7:00 pm, SECN+		North Carolina A&T	W 72–54	2–0	16 – Connally	15 – Staiti	7 – Connally	Stegeman Coliseum (2,252); Athens, GA
November 17, 2019*; 2:00 pm, SECN+		Georgia Tech	L 40–73	2–1	11 – Connally	9 – Staiti	2 – Connally	Stegeman Coliseum (3,362); Athens, GA
November 21, 2019*; 7:00 pm, SECN+		Mercer	W 76–60	3–1	14 – Connally	9 – Morrison	4 – Chapman	Stegeman Coliseum (2,230); Athens, GA
November 24, 2019*; 6:00 pm, SECN+		Villanova	L 58–63	3–2	17 – Staiti	8 – Staiti	7 – Connally	Stegeman Coliseum (2,707); Athens, GA
November 26, 2019*; 7:00 pm, SECN+		USC Upstate	W 67–53	4–2	16 – Connally	11 – Paul	5 – Tied	Stegeman Coliseum (2,319); Athens, GA
November 29, 2019*; 2:10 pm		vs. Butler; Daytona Beach Invitational	W 69–36	5–2	17 – Caldwell	9 – Staiti	4 – Connally	Ocean Center (212); Daytona Beach, FL
November 30, 2019*; 1:15 pm		vs. Virginia Tech; Daytona Beach Invitational	W 77–72	6–2	22 – Connally	5 – Tied	4 – Morrison	Ocean Center; Daytona Beach, FL
December 4, 2019*; 8:00 pm, ESPN+		at No. 7 Baylor; Big 12/SEC Women's Challenge	L 38–72	6–3	11 – Tied	7 – Paul	3 – Caldwell	Ferrell Center (8,172); Waco, TX
December 15, 2019*; 2:00 pm, SECN+		Furman	W 77–48	7–3	20 – Jones	7 – Nicholson	4 – Connally	Stegeman Coliseum (2,832); Athens, GA
December 19, 2019*; 11:00 am, SECN		No. 10 UCLA	L 50–59	7–4	16 – Connally	6 – Connally	3 – Caldwell	Stegeman Coliseum (7,123); Athens, GA
December 22, 2019*; 2:00 pm, SECN		Gardner–Webb	W 84–56	8–4	22 – Nicholson	10 – Nicholson	4 – Chapman	Stegeman Coliseum (2,953); Athens, GA
December 29, 2019*; 2:00 pm, SECN+		East Carolina	W 67–50	9–4	14 – Staiti	10 – Nicholson	3 – Morrison	Stegeman Coliseum (2,938); Athens, GA
SEC regular season
January 2, 2020; 7:15 pm, SECN+		at Ole Miss	W 58–51	10–4 (1–0)	18 – Paul	9 – Nicholson	5 – Connally	The Pavilion at Ole Miss (1,093); Oxford, MS
January 5, 2020; 4:00 pm, SECN/ESPN2		No. 15 Mississippi State	L 66–73	10–5 (1–1)	15 – Paul	9 – Paul	4 – Connally	Stegeman Coliseum (3,006); Athens, GA
January 9, 2020; 7:00 pm, SECN+		Vanderbilt	L 55–63	10–6 (1–2)	18 – Staiti	11 – Staiti	7 – Morrison	Stegeman Coliseum (3,006); Athens, GA
January 12, 2020; 1:00 pm, SECN		at No. 23 Tennessee	L 56–73	10–7 (1–3)	13 – Caldwell	6 – Nicholson	6 – Connally	Thompson–Boling Arena (10,036); Knoxville, TN
January 19, 2020; 2:00 pm, ESPNU		Auburn	W 61–50	11–7 (2–3)	21 – Jones	8 – Morrison	6 – Tied	Stegeman Coliseum (4,888); Athens, GA
January 23, 2020; 7:00 pm, SECN		at No. 21 Arkansas	W 64–55	12–7 (3–3)	18 – Connally	9 – Paul	3 – Caldwell	Bud Walton Arena (1,822); Fayetteville, AR
January 26, 2020; 3:00 pm, SECN		No. 1 South Carolina	L 53–88	12–8 (3–4)	13 – Paul	5 – Tied	9 – Connally	Stegeman Coliseum (6,047); Athens, GA
January 30, 2020; 8:00 pm, SECN+		at No. 15 Texas A&M	L 63–64	12–9 (3–5)	20 – Connally	6 – Tied	5 – Tied	Reed Arena (3,044); College Station, TX
February 3, 2020; 7:00 pm, SECN		at No. 8 Mississippi State	L 53–67	12–10 (3–6)	18 – Morrison	9 – Staiti	5 – Morrison	Humphrey Coliseum (6,848); Starkville, MS
February 6, 2020; 7:00 pm, SECN+		Missouri	L 65–73	12–11 (3–7)	24 – Staiti	8 – Staiti	5 – Caldwell	Stegeman Coliseum (2,940); Athens, GA
February 9, 2020; 1:00 pm, SECN		at Florida	W 49–43	13–11 (4–7)	21 – Staiti	15 – Staiti	2 – Caldwell	O'Connell Center (2,439); Gainesville, FL
February 16, 2020; 1:00 pm, SECN		Alabama	W 76–75 ^{OT}	14–11 (5–7)	18 – Tied	9 – Caldwell	6 – Connally	Stegeman Coliseum (4,569); Athens, GA
February 20, 2020; 7:00 pm, SECN+		No. 16 Texas A&M	L 47–64	14–12 (5–8)	15 – Staiti	6 – Paul	4 – Hose	Stegeman Coliseum (2,720); Athens, GA
February 23, 2020; 3:00 pm, SECN+		at LSU	W 73–56	15–12 (6–8)	24 – Staiti	9 – Staiti	3 – Tied	Pete Maravich Assembly Center (2,193); Baton Rouge, LA
February 27, 2020; 8:00 pm, SECN+		at No. 15 Kentucky	L 77–88	15–13 (6–9)	22 – Staiti	8 – Staiti	3 – Connally	Memorial Coliseum (4,163); Lexington, KY
March 1, 2020; 1:10 pm, SECN+		Florida	W 65–59	16–13 (7–9)	20 – Staiti	12 – Staiti	4 – Tied	Stegeman Coliseum (3,539); Athens, GA
SEC Tournament
March 5, 2020; 12:00 pm, SECN	(9)	vs. (8) Alabama; Second round	W 68–61	17–13	20 – Staiti	14 – Staiti	6 – Chapman	Bon Secours Wellness Arena; Greenville, SC
March 6, 2020; 12:00 pm, SECN	(9)	vs. (1) No. 1 South Carolina; Quarterfinals	L 56–89	17–14	16 – Stati	6 – Stati	5 – Caldwell	Bon Secours Wellness Arena; Greenville, SC
*Non-conference game. ^{#}Rankings from AP Poll. (#) Tournament seedings in parentheses. All times are in Eastern Time.
