= 2019–20 LSU Lady Tigers basketball team =

Intercollegiate basketball season

2019–20 LSU Lady Tigers basketball

Junkanoo Jam Bimini Division champions
- Conference: Southeastern Conference
- Record: 20–10 (9–7 SEC)
- Head coach: Nikki Fargas (9th season)
- Assistant coaches: Cherie Cordoba; Aaron Kallhoff; Charlene Thomas-Swinson
- Home arena: Pete Maravich Assembly Center

2019–20 SEC women's basketball standings
	Conf.				Overall
Team	W		L	PCT	W		L	PCT
No. 1 South Carolina †	16	–	0	1.000	32	–	1	.970
No. 9 Mississippi State	13	–	3	.813	27	–	6	.818
No. 24 Arkansas	10	–	6	.625	24	–	8	.750
No. 16 Kentucky	10	–	6	.625	22	–	8	.733
No. 19 Texas A&M	10	–	6	.625	22	–	8	.733
Tennessee	10	–	6	.625	21	–	10	.677
LSU	9	–	7	.563	20	–	10	.667
Alabama	8	–	8	.500	18	–	12	.600
Georgia	7	–	9	.438	17	–	14	.548
Florida	6	–	10	.375	15	–	15	.500
Missouri	5	–	11	.313	9	–	22	.290
Vanderbilt	4	–	12	.250	14	–	16	.467
Auburn	4	–	12	.250	11	–	18	.379
Ole Miss	0	–	16	.000	7	–	23	.233
† 2020 SEC tournament winner Rankings from AP poll

The 2019–20 LSU Lady Tigers basketball team represented Louisiana State University during the 2019–20 NCAA Division I women's basketball season. The Lady Tigers, led by ninth-year head coach Nikki Fargas, played their home games at the Pete Maravich Assembly Center and competed as members of the Southeastern Conference (SEC).

== Preseason ==
=== SEC media poll ===
The SEC media poll was released on October 15, 2019.

Media poll
Predicted finish	Team
1	South Carolina
2	Texas A&M
3	Mississippi State
4	Kentucky
5	Arkansas
6	Tennessee
7	Auburn
8	LSU
9	Missouri
10	Georgia
11	Alabama
12	Florida
13	Ole Miss
14	Vanderbilt

== Roster ==
2019–20 LSU Lady Tigers women's basketball team
Players
Coaches

Pos.	#	Name	Height	Year	Previous school	Hometown
F	0	Awa Trasi	6 ft 1 in (1.85 m)	Jr	Lycée Jeanne D'Arc; Northwest Florida State College	Toulouse, France
G	1	Jailin Cherry	5 ft 8 in (1.73 m)	Jr	Pascagoula HS	Pascagoula, MS
G	2	Tiara Young	5 ft 8 in (1.73 m)	Fr	Walker HS	Shreveport, LA
G	3	Khayla Pointer	5 ft 7 in (1.7 m)	Jr	Holy Innocents' Episcopal	Marietta, GA
F	5	Ayana Mitchell	6 ft 2 in (1.88 m)	Jr	Salem HS	Conyers, GA
F	11	Emily Ward	5 ft 11 in (1.8 m)	Fr	Benton HS	Bossier City, LA
G/F	12	Mercedes Brooks	6 ft 0 in (1.83 m)	Sr	Rider HS; Trinity Valley CC	Wichita Falls, TX
G	13	Jaelyn Richard-Harris	5 ft 4 in (1.63 m)	Sr	Dekaney HS	Houston, TX
G	14	LaToya Ashman	5 ft 10 in (1.78 m)	Sr	Wellington HS; FSW State	Wellington, FL
G	21	Domonique Davis	5 ft 6 in (1.68 m)	Fr	DeRidder HS	DeRidder, LA
G	23	Karli Seay	5 ft 8 in (1.73 m)	Jr	Homewood-Flossmor HS; Western Nebraska CC	Flossmoor, IL
C	24	Faustine Aifuwa	6 ft 5 in (1.96 m)	RS Jr	Dacula HS	Dacula, GA
G	25	Rakell Spencer	5 ft 11 in (1.8 m)	RS Jr	Cabrini HS; Texas A&M	New Orleans, LA
F	32	Jalaysha Thomas	6 ft 2 in (1.88 m)	RS So	West Port HS; Florida	Ocala, FL
G	35	Sharna Ayres	5 ft 10 in (1.78 m)	Fr	Box Hill Senior Secondary College	Melbourne, Australia

Head coach

- Nikki Fargas (Tennessee)

Assistant coach(es)

- Cherie Cordoba (UNLV)
- Aaron Kallhoff (Bemidji State)
- Charlene Thomas-Swinson (Auburn)

Legend

- (C) Team captain
- (S) Suspended
- (I) Ineligible
- (W) Walk-on
- Injured
- Current redshirt

Roster

== Schedule ==
Date time, TV	Rank^{#}	Opponent^{#}	Result	Record	High points	High rebounds	High assists	Site (attendance) city, state
Exhibition
November 1, 2019*; 6:30 pm		Mississippi College	W 77–44		–	–	–	Pete Maravich Assembly Center; Baton Rouge, LA
Non-conference regular season
November 5, 2019*; 6:30 pm, SECN+		New Orleans	W 83–49	1–0	19 – Young	13 – Mitchell	4 – Tied	Pete Maravich Assembly Center (1,192); Baton Rouge, LA
November 9, 2019*; 1:00 pm, SECN+		No. 12 Florida State	L 62–70	1–1	22 – Pointer	9 – Mitchell	6 – Pointer	Pete Maravich Assembly Center (647); Baton Rouge, LA
November 13, 2019*; 6:30 pm, CST		at Little Rock	W 65–50	2–1	22 – Pointer	7 – Aifuwa	6 – Pointer	Jack Stephens Center (1,030); Little Rock, AR
November 17, 2019*; 4:00 pm		at Tulane	W 59–54	3–1	18 – Aifuwa	10 – Mitchell	6 – Seay	Devlin Fieldhouse (720); New Orleans, LA
November 20, 2019*; 6:30 pm, SECN+		Southeastern Louisiana	W 62–52	4–1	14 – Mitchell	13 – Mitchell	4 – Pointer	Pete Maravich Assembly Center (823); Baton Rouge, LA
November 24, 2019*; 7:00 pm, SECN		Rutgers	W 64–58	5–1	17 – Mitchell	10 – Mitchell	3 – Tied	Pete Maravich Assembly Center (1,309); Baton Rouge, LA
November 29, 2019*; 4:15 pm		vs. No. 15 Michigan State; Junkanoo Jam Bimini Division semifinals	W 58–56	6–1	13 – Pointer	8 – Aifuwa	3 – Pointer	Gateway Sporting Arena; Bimini, Bahamas
November 30, 2019*; 6:45 pm		vs. Memphis; Junkanoo Jam Bimini Division championship	W 89–58	7–1	17 – Pointer	7 – Trasi	6 – Harris	Gateway Sporting Arena (150); Bimini, Bahamas
December 3, 2019*; 11:00 am, SECN+	No. 25	Nicholls	W 63–32	8–1	21 – Mitchell	6 – Tied	7 – Pointer	Pete Maravich Assembly Center (6,970); Baton Rouge, LA
December 7, 2019*; 3:00 pm	No. 25	at Oklahoma; Big 12/SEC Women's Challenge	L 68–90	8–2	24 – Pointer	7 – Spencer	3 – Pointer	Lloyd Noble Center (1,327); Norman, OK
December 19, 2019*; 6:00 pm, ESPN+		at Florida Gulf Coast	W 74–63	9–2	30 – Pointer	11 – Pointer	6 – Pointer	Alico Arena (2,335); Fort Myers, FL
December 28, 2019*; 12:00 pm, SECN+		Florida A&M	W 73–45	10–2	20 – Mitchell	7 – Tied	4 – Pointer	Pete Maravich Assembly Center (1,287); Baton Rouge, LA
SEC regular season
January 2, 2020; 7:40 pm, SECN+		Alabama	W 71–60	11–2 (1–0)	20 – Mitchell	11 – Mitchell	8 – Pointer	Pete Maravich Assembly Center (1,667); Baton Rouge, LA
January 5, 2020; 1:00 pm, ESPNU		at Missouri	L 65–69	11–3 (1–1)	23 – Pointer	16 – Mitchell	2 – Pointer	Mizzou Arena (4,437); Columbia, MO
January 9, 2020; 8:00 pm, SECN		at No. 10 Texas A&M	W 57–54	12–3 (2–1)	12 – Cherry	10 – Mitchell	10 – Pointer	Reed Arena (4,007); College Station, TX
January 12, 2020; 2:00 pm, SECN+		Ole Miss	W 52–44	13–3 (3–1)	12 – Mitchell	14 – Mitchell	7 – Pointer	Pete Maravich Assembly Center (2,030); Baton Rouge, LA
January 16, 2020; 7:00 pm, SECN+		at No. 10 Mississippi State	L 60–64	13–4 (3–2)	22 – Mitchell	12 – Tied	5 – Richard-Harris	Humphrey Coliseum (7,846); Starkville, MS
January 19, 2020; 1:00 pm, SECN		No. 11 Kentucky	W 65–59	14–4 (4–2)	15 – Mitchell	13 – Aifuwa	7 – Pointer	Pete Maravich Assembly Center (2,537); Baton Rouge, LA
January 26, 2020; 12:00 pm, SECN		at No. 23 Tennessee	L 58–63	14–5 (4–3)	24 – Mitchell	12 – Mitchell	4 – Seay	Thompson–Boling Arena (10,230); Knoxville, TN
January 30, 2020; 5:00 pm, SECN+		at Florida	W 77–68	15–5 (5–3)	24 – Pointer	11 – Aifuwa	4 – Pointer	O'Connell Center (1,018); Gainesville, FL
February 2, 2020; 2:00 pm, SECN		No. 15 Texas A&M	W 59–58	16–5 (6–3)	18 – Tied	16 – Aifuwa	4 – Tied	Pete Maravich Assembly Center (2,494); Baton Rouge, LA
February 10, 2020; 6:00 pm, SECN		Missouri	W 66–58	17–5 (7–3)	19 – Aifuwa	16 – Aifuwa	6 – Pointer	Pete Maravich Assembly Center (1,610); Baton Rouge, LA
February 13, 2020; 6:30 pm, SECN+		No. 25 Tennessee	W 75–65	18–5 (8–3)	24 – Pointer	10 – Pointer	6 – Pointer	Pete Maravich Assembly Center (1,966); Baton Rouge, LA
February 16, 2020; 4:00 pm, SECN		at Auburn	L 60–65	18–6 (8–4)	20 – Aifuwa	10 – Aifuwa	7 – Pointer	Auburn Arena (2,057); Auburn, AL
February 20, 2020; 6:00 pm, SECN+		at No. 1 South Carolina	L 48–63	18–7 (8–5)	13 – Cherry	5 – Cherry	5 – Pointer	Colonial Life Arena (11,242); Columbia, SC
February 23, 2020; 2:00 pm, SECN+		Georgia	L 56–73	18–8 (8–6)	13 – Trasi	6 – Aifuwa	6 – Pointer	Pete Maravich Assembly Center; Baton Rouge, LA
February 27, 2020; 6:30 pm, SECN+		Vanderbilt	W 61–55	19–8 (9–6)	18 – Aifuwa	8 – Aifuwa	7 – Pointer	Pete Maravich Assembly Center; Baton Rouge, LA
March 1, 2020; 1:10 pm, SECN+		at Arkansas	L 71–75	19–9 (9–7)	16 – Cherry	10 – Tied	4 – Tied	Bud Walton Arena (4,402); Fayetteville, AR
SEC Tournament
March 5, 2020; 5:00 pm, SECN	(7)	vs. (10) Florida; Second round	W 73–59	20–9	19 – Pointer	5 – Cherry	4 – Tied	Bon Secours Wellness Arena; Greenville, SC
March 6, 2020; 5:00 pm, SECN	(7)	vs. (2) No. 9 Mississippi State; Quarterfinals	L 49–79	20–10	14 – Pointer	10 – Trasi	4 – Pointer	Bon Secours Wellness Arena; Greenville, SC
*Non-conference game. ^{#}Rankings from AP Poll. (#) Tournament seedings in parentheses. All times are in Central Time.
