= 2019–20 Vanderbilt Commodores women's basketball team =

Intercollegiate basketball season

2019–20 Vanderbilt Commodores women's basketball
- Conference: Southeastern Conference
- Record: 14–16 (4–12 SEC)
- Head coach: Stephanie White (4th season)
- Assistant coaches: Kelly Komara; Gary Redus II; Shereka Wright
- Home arena: Memorial Gymnasium

2019–20 SEC women's basketball standings
	Conf.				Overall
Team	W		L	PCT	W		L	PCT
No. 1 South Carolina †	16	–	0	1.000	32	–	1	.970
No. 9 Mississippi State	13	–	3	.813	27	–	6	.818
No. 24 Arkansas	10	–	6	.625	24	–	8	.750
No. 16 Kentucky	10	–	6	.625	22	–	8	.733
No. 19 Texas A&M	10	–	6	.625	22	–	8	.733
Tennessee	10	–	6	.625	21	–	10	.677
LSU	9	–	7	.563	20	–	10	.667
Alabama	8	–	8	.500	18	–	12	.600
Georgia	7	–	9	.438	17	–	14	.548
Florida	6	–	10	.375	15	–	15	.500
Missouri	5	–	11	.313	9	–	22	.290
Vanderbilt	4	–	12	.250	14	–	16	.467
Auburn	4	–	12	.250	11	–	18	.379
Ole Miss	0	–	16	.000	7	–	23	.233
† 2020 SEC tournament winner Rankings from AP poll

The 2019–20 Vanderbilt Commodores women's basketball team represented Vanderbilt University during the 2019–20 NCAA Division I women's basketball season. The Commodores, led by fourth-year head coach Stephanie White, played their home games at Memorial Gymnasium and competed as members of the Southeastern Conference (SEC).

== Preseason ==
=== SEC media poll ===
The SEC media poll was released on October 15, 2019.

Media poll
Predicted finish	Team
1	South Carolina
2	Texas A&M
3	Mississippi State
4	Kentucky
5	Arkansas
6	Tennessee
7	Auburn
8	LSU
9	Missouri
10	Georgia
11	Alabama
12	Florida
13	Ole Miss
14	Vanderbilt

== Schedule ==
Date time, TV	Rank^{#}	Opponent^{#}	Result	Record	High points	High rebounds	High assists	Site (attendance) city, state
Non-conference regular season
November 5, 2019*; 7:00 pm, SECN+		Jacksonville State	W 88–66	1–0	20 – Alexander	13 – Newby	5 – Hall	Memorial Gymnasium (1,951); Nashville, TN
November 8, 2019*; 7:00 pm, SECN+		Radford	W 80–46	2–0	29 – Fasoula	11 – Fasoula	5 – Hall	Memorial Gymnasium (2,034); Nashville, TN
November 13, 2019*; 6:00 pm, SECN		No. 4 UConn	L 51–64	2–1	14 – Love	6 – Tied	3 – Hall	Memorial Gymnasium (2,961); Nashville, TN
November 17, 2019*; 2:00 pm, SECN+		Saint Louis	W 62–50	3–1	17 – Tied	5 – Tied	4 – Fasoula	Memorial Gymnasium (2,216); Nashville, TN
November 22, 2019*; 5:30 pm, SECN+		Furman	W 74–46	4–1	17 – Alexander	6 – Tied	4 – Hall	Memorial Gymnasium (2,098); Nashville, TN
November 25, 2019*; 6:00 pm		at Tennessee State	W 106–55	5–1	20 – Carter	10 – Love	7 – Love	Gentry Complex (438); Nashville, TN
November 28, 2019*; 2:00 pm		vs. Rutgers; Junkanoo Jam Junkanoo Division semifinals	L 56–62	5–2	17 – Fasoula	8 – Tied	5 – Hall	Gateway Sporting Arena; Bimini, Bahamas
November 29, 2019*; 6:45 pm		vs. Seton Hall; Junkanoo Jam Junkanoo Division 3rd place game	L 65–69	5–3	21 – Fasoula	11 – Fasoula	4 – Cambridge	Gateway Sporting Arena (150); Bimini, Bahamas
December 5, 2019*; 7:00 pm, SECN+		Tennessee Tech	W 75–61	6–3	23 – Fasoula	11 – Fasoula	6 – Newby	Memorial Gymnasium (2,100); Nashville, TN
December 15, 2019*; 3:00 pm, SECN+		Eastern Kentucky	W 75–69	7–3	17 – Love	11 – Fasoula	6 – Hall	Memorial Gymnasium (1,726); Nashville, TN
December 20, 2019*; 10:00 pm		vs. UC Irvine; Husky Classic	W 76–63	8–3	18 – Love	12 – Fasoula	6 – Love	Hec Edmundson Pavilion (1,252); Seattle, WA
December 21, 2019*; 6:00 pm		at Washington; Husky Classic	W 76–74 ^{OT}	9–3	19 – Tied	10 – Love	9 – Hall	Hec Edmundson Pavilion; Seattle, WA
December 29, 2019*; 2:00 pm, SECN+		Columbia	W 72–51	10–3	18 – Love	10 – Tied	5 – Cambridge	Memorial Gymnasium; Nashville, TN
SEC regular season
January 2, 2020; 7:30 pm, SECN		Auburn	W 77–55	11–3 (1–0)	21 – Fasoula	9 – Fasoula	9 – Hall	Memorial Gymnasium (2,255); Nashville, TN
January 5, 2020; 11:00 am, ESPNU		at Florida	L 60–68	11–4 (1–1)	19 – Love	7 – Newby	3 – Carter	O'Connell Center (1,229); Gainesville, FL
January 9, 2020; 6:00 pm, SECN+		at Georgia	W 63–55	12–4 (2–1)	22 – Love	8 – Cambridge	3 – Tied	Stegeman Coliseum (2,522); Athens, GA
January 12, 2020; 4:00 pm, SECN		No. 4 South Carolina	L 57–93	12–5 (2–2)	15 – Hall	7 – Newby	3 – Hall	Memorial Gymnasium (2,447); Nashville, TN
January 19, 2020; 5:00 pm, SECN		No. 23 Arkansas	L 66–100	12–6 (2–3)	20 – Love	9 – Love	6 – Cambridge	Memorial Gymnasium (2,734); Nashville, TN
January 23, 2020; 8:00 pm, SECN		No. 9 Mississippi State	L 52–68	12–7 (2–4)	19 – Love	9 – Love	3 – Carter	Memorial Gymnasium (2,157); Nashville, TN
January 26, 2020; 2:00 pm, SECN+		at Alabama	L 61–98	12–8 (2–5)	15 – Carter	5 – Hall	3 – Cambridge	Coleman Coliseum (2,067); Tuscaloosa, AL
January 30, 2020; 8:00 pm, SECN		No. 22 Tennessee; Rivalry	L 69–78	12–9 (2–6)	16 – Love	6 – Hall	5 – Cambridge	Memorial Gymnasium (3,429); Nashville, TN
February 2, 2020; 2:00 pm, SECN+		at Auburn	L 62–70	12–10 (2–7)	22 – Love	11 – Love	8 – Cambridge	Auburn Arena (1,728); Auburn, AL
February 9, 2020; 4:00 pm, SECN		Ole Miss	W 63–47	13–10 (3–7)	21 – Hall	11 – Newby	5 – Cambridge	Memorial Gymnasium (2,846); Nashville, TN
February 13, 2020; 8:00 pm, SECN		at No. 16 Texas A&M	L 53–74	13–11 (3–8)	13 – Love	8 – Cambridge	4 – Cambridge	Reed Arena (3,193); College Station, TX
February 17, 2020; 6:00 pm, SECN		at No. 1 South Carolina	L 44–95	13–12 (3–9)	11 – Fasoula	8 – Newby	5 – Cambridge	Colonial Life Arena (11,249); Columbia, SC
February 20, 2020; 7:00 pm, SECN+		Missouri	L 66–78	13–13 (3–10)	15 – Hall	8 – Love	5 – Cambridge	Memorial Gymnasium (2,166); Nashville, TN
February 23, 2020; 11:00 am, ESPN2		at Tennessee; Rivalry	L 63–67	13–14 (3–11)	20 – Hall	13 – Fasoula	5 – Cambridge	Thompson–Boling Arena (9,636); Knoxville, TN
February 27, 2020; 6:30 pm, SECN+		at LSU	L 55–61	13–15 (3–12)	16 – Hall	7 – Fasoula	4 – Tied	Pete Maravich Assembly Center (1,780); Baton Rouge, LA
March 1, 2020; 1:05 pm, SECN		No. 15 Kentucky	W 70–64	14–15 (4–12)	24 – Fasoula	9 – Fasoula	7 – Hall	Memorial Gymnasium (3,081); Nashville, TN
SEC Tournament
March 4, 2020; 10:00 am, SECN	(12)	vs. (13) Auburn; First round	L 67–77	14–16	26 – Love	7 – Tied	8 – Hall	Bon Secours Wellness Arena; Greenville, SC
*Non-conference game. ^{#}Rankings from AP Poll. (#) Tournament seedings in parentheses. All times are in Central Time.
