= 2019–20 Missouri Tigers women's basketball team =

Intercollegiate basketball season

2019–20 Missouri Tigers women's basketball
- Conference: Southeastern Conference
- Record: 9–22 (5–11 SEC)
- Head coach: Robin Pingeton (10th season)
- Assistant coaches: Ashleen Bracey; Chris Bracey; Jenny Putnam
- Home arena: Mizzou Arena

2019–20 SEC women's basketball standings
	Conf.				Overall
Team	W		L	PCT	W		L	PCT
No. 1 South Carolina †	16	–	0	1.000	32	–	1	.970
No. 9 Mississippi State	13	–	3	.813	27	–	6	.818
No. 24 Arkansas	10	–	6	.625	24	–	8	.750
No. 16 Kentucky	10	–	6	.625	22	–	8	.733
No. 19 Texas A&M	10	–	6	.625	22	–	8	.733
Tennessee	10	–	6	.625	21	–	10	.677
LSU	9	–	7	.563	20	–	10	.667
Alabama	8	–	8	.500	18	–	12	.600
Georgia	7	–	9	.438	17	–	14	.548
Florida	6	–	10	.375	15	–	15	.500
Missouri	5	–	11	.313	9	–	22	.290
Vanderbilt	4	–	12	.250	14	–	16	.467
Auburn	4	–	12	.250	11	–	18	.379
Ole Miss	0	–	16	.000	7	–	23	.233
† 2020 SEC tournament winner Rankings from AP poll

The 2019–20 Missouri Tigers women's basketball team represented the University of Missouri during the 2019–20 NCAA Division I women's basketball season. The Tigers, led by tenth-year head coach Robin Pingeton, played their home games at Mizzou Arena and competed as members of the Southeastern Conference (SEC).

== Offseason ==
=== Departures ===
Name	Pos.	Height	Year	Hometown	Reason for departure
Kelsey Winfrey	G	5'9"	Sophomore	Lebanon, MO	Transferred to Drury
Akira Levy	G	5'8"	Freshman	Baxter, TN	Transferred to Vanderbilt
Sophie Cunningham	G	6'1"	Senior	Columbia, MO	Graduated & Drafted in 2019 WNBA draft 13th overall
Lauren Aldridge	G	5'7"	RS Senior	Marshfield, MO	Graduated
Cierra Porter	F	6'4"	Senior	Columbia, MO	Graduated
Emmanuelle Tahane	F	6'1"	Sophomore	Bondy, France	Transferred to Rhode Island

=== Incoming ===
College recruiting
Name	Hometown	School	Height	Weight	Commit date
Aijha Blackwell; G	Berkeley, MO	Cardinal Ritter College Prep High School	6 ft 0 in (1.83 m)	N/A	
Aijha Blackwell; G	Recruit ratings: ESPN: (98)				
Hayley Frank; F	Strafford, MO	Strafford High School	6 ft 1 in (1.85 m)	N/A	
Hayley Frank; F	Recruit ratings: ESPN: (97)				
Micah Linthacum; F	Jefferson City, MO	Jefferson City High School	6 ft 3 in (1.91 m)	N/A	
Micah Linthacum; F	Recruit ratings: ESPN: (90)				
Overall recruit ranking:
Note: In many cases, Scout, Rivals, 247Sports, On3, and ESPN may conflict in their listings of height and weight.; In these cases, the average was taken. ESPN grades are on a 100-point scale.; Sources:

=== Incoming transfers ===
Name	Number	Pos.	Height	Year	Hometown	Notes
Renetha "Shug" Dickson	1	G	5'9"	Senior	St. Louis, MO	Transferred from Tulsa
LaDazhia Williams	0	F	6'4"	Junior	Bradenton, FL	Transferred from South Carolina
Shannon Dufficy	5	F	6'2"	Senior	Melbourne, VIC	Transferred from Utah State

== Roster ==
2019–20 Missouri Tigers women's basketball team
Players
Coaches

Pos.	#	Name	Height	Year	Previous school	Hometown
F	0	LaDazhia Williams (redshirt)	6 ft 4 in (1.93 m)	Jr	Lakewood Ranch; South Carolina	Bradenton, FL
G	1	Shug Dickson (redshirt)	5 ft 9 in (1.75 m)	Sr	Lutheran; Texas Tech; Tulsa	St. Louis, MO
F	5	Shannon Dufficy (redshirt)	6 ft 2 in (1.88 m)	Sr	Our Lady of Mercy College; Utah State	Melbourne, VIC
G	10	Nadia Green	5 ft 7 in (1.7 m)	Jr	Homewood-Flossmoor	Chicago, IL
G	11	Haley Troup	5 ft 10 in (1.78 m)	RS So	Gadsen	Gadsden, AL
G	12	Elle Brown	5 ft 11 in (1.8 m)	Jr	Rock Bridge	Columbia, MO
F	13	Hannah Schuchts	6 ft 2 in (1.88 m)	RS Sr	Maclay	Tallahassee, FL
G	22	Jordan Roundtree	5 ft 9 in (1.75 m)	Sr	Kirkwood	St. Louis, MO
G	23	Amber Smith	5 ft 11 in (1.8 m)	Sr	Loyola	Shreveport, LA
G	24	Jordan Chavis	5 ft 7 in (1.7 m)	Sr	Central Davidson	Lexington, NC
G	33	Aijha Blackwell	6 ft 0 in (1.83 m)	Fr	Cardinal Ritter	Berkeley, MO
F	40	Micah Linthacum	6 ft 4 in (1.93 m)	Fr	Jefferson City	Jefferson, MO
F	43	Hayley Frank	6 ft 1 in (1.85 m)	Fr	Strafford	Strafford, MO

Head coach

- Robin Pingeton (St. Ambrose)

Assistant coach(es)

- Jenny Putnam (St. Ambrose)
- Ashleen Bracey (Illinois State)
- Chris Bracey (West Texas A&M)

Legend

- (C) Team captain
- (S) Suspended
- (I) Ineligible
- (W) Walk-on
- Injured
- Current redshirt

Roster
Last update: February 15, 2020

== Preseason ==
=== SEC media poll ===
The SEC media poll was released on October 15, 2019.

Media poll
Predicted finish	Team
1	South Carolina
2	Texas A&M
3	Mississippi State
4	Kentucky
5	Arkansas
6	Tennessee
7	Auburn
8	LSU
9	Missouri
10	Georgia
11	Alabama
12	Florida
13	Ole Miss
14	Vanderbilt

== Schedule ==
Date time, TV	Rank^{#}	Opponent^{#}	Result	Record	High points	High rebounds	High assists	Site (attendance) city, state
Non-conference regular season
November 5, 2019*; 6:00 pm, SECN+		Western Illinois	W 97–89 ^{OT}	1–0	27 – Smith	15 – Smith	8 – Chavis	Mizzou Arena (3,851); Columbia, MO
November 10, 2019*; 2:00 pm, SECN+		Nebraska	L 85–90 ^{OT}	1–1	21 – Blackwell	14 – Smith	4 – Blackwell	Mizzou Arena (4,114); Columbia, MO
November 13, 2019*; 7:00 pm, SECN+		Northern Iowa	L 73–78	1–2	19 – Smith	7 – Smith	3 – Chavis	Mizzou Arena (3,029); Columbia, MO
November 16, 2019*; 1:00 pm		at Green Bay	L 64–72	1–3	13 – Schuchts	8 – Tied	3 – Chavis	Kress Events Center (1,847); Green Bay, WI
November 21, 2019*; 7:00 pm		at South Dakota	L 56–72	1–4	15 – Frank	6 – Smith	3 – Tied	Sanford Coyote Sports Center (2,407); Vermillion, SD
November 24, 2019*; 2:00 pm, SECN+		SIU Edwardsville	W 68–51	2–4	15 – Smith	8 – Green	3 – Green	Mizzou Arena (4,033); Columbia, MO
November 28, 2019*; 3:00 pm		vs. New Mexico; Cancún Challenge	L 68–71	2–5	29 – Frank	8 – Schuchts	4 – Tied	Hard Rock Hotel Riviera (502); Cancún, Mexico
November 29, 2019*; 5:30 pm		vs. North Carolina; Cancún Challenge	L 69–82	2–6	16 – Smith	6 – Tied	2 – Tied	Hard Rock Hotel Riviera (157); Cancún, Mexico
December 5, 2019*; 7:00 pm, SECN+		Saint Louis	W 83–58	3–6	17 – Blackwell	6 – Blackwell	3 – Green	Mizzou Arena (3,360); Columbia, MO
December 8, 2019*; 2:00 pm		at Kansas City	L 56–59	3–7	12 – Tied	7 – Blackwell	6 – Blackwell	Swinney Recreation Center (1,098); Kansas City, MO
December 15, 2019*; 3:00 pm		at No. 20 Missouri State	L 72–79	3–8	22 – Smith	8 – Frank	4 – Blackwell	JQH Arena (5,091); Springfield, MO
December 18, 2019*; 7:00 pm, SECN+		Princeton	L 33–68	3–9	10 – Frank	9 – Blackwell	2 – Troup	Mizzou Arena (3,694); Columbia, MO
December 20, 2019*; 12:00 pm, SECN		Illinois	L 51–58	3–10	21 – Blackwell	8 – Tied	3 – Tied	Mizzou Arena (4,332); Columbia, MO
SEC regular season
January 2, 2020; 6:00 pm, SECN		at No. 22 Tennessee	L 66–77	3–11 (0–1)	22 – Smith	5 – Green	4 – Troup	Thompson–Boling Arena (7,814); Knoxville, TN
January 5, 2020; 1:00 pm, ESPNU		LSU	W 69–65	4–11 (1–1)	15 – Blackwell	11 – Blackwell	5 – Tied	Mizzou Arena (4,437); Columbia, MO
January 9, 2020; 6:00 pm, SECN		No. 13 Mississippi State	L 64–79	4–12 (1–2)	14 – Troup	6 – Tied	5 – Blackwell	Mizzou Arena (3,920); Columbia, MO
January 12, 2020; 2:00 pm, SECN		at No. 21 Arkansas	L 73–90	4–13 (1–3)	19 – Frank	12 – Schuchts	6 – Troup	Bud Walton Arena (4,172); Fayetteville, AR
January 16, 2020; 7:30 pm, SECN		No. 1 South Carolina	L 45–78	4–14 (1–4)	13 – Blackwell	6 – Blackwell	2 – Tied	Mizzou Arena (10,234); Columbia, MO
January 19, 2020; 2:00 pm, SECN+		at Ole Miss	W 71–57	5–14 (2–4)	20 – Blackwell	10 – Smith	4 – Blackwell	The Pavilion at Ole Miss (1,287); Oxford, MS
January 26, 2020; 3:00 pm, SECN+		at No. 15 Texas A&M	L 53–72	5–15 (2–5)	18 – Blackwell	7 – Blackwell	5 – Schuchts	Reed Arena (3,883); College Station, TX
January 30, 2020; 6:00 pm, SECN		No. 13 Kentucky	L 47–62	5–16 (2–6)	17 – Blackwell	9 – Blackwell	2 – Tied	Mizzou Arena (3,405); Columbia, MO
February 2, 2020; 4:00 pm, SECN		No. 25 Arkansas	L 81–85 ^{OT}	5–17 (2–7)	22 – Smith	9 – Tied	3 – Tied	Mizzou Arena (3,531); Columbia, MO
February 6, 2020; 6:00 pm, SECN+		at Georgia	W 73–65	6–17 (3–7)	26 – Blackwell	11 – Blackwell	3 – Schuchts	Stegeman Coliseum (2,940); Athens, GA
February 10, 2020; 6:00 pm, SECN		at LSU	L 58–66	6–18 (3–8)	12 – Blackwell	14 – Blackwell	3 – Tied	Pete Maravich Assembly Center (1,610); Baton Rouge, LA
February 16, 2020; 2:00 pm, SECN+		Florida	L 67–75	6–19 (3–9)	20 – Blackwell	8 – Smith	3 – Blackwell	Mizzou Arena (4,635); Columbia, MO
February 20, 2020; 7:00 pm, SECN+		at Vanderbilt	W 78–66	7–19 (4–9)	24 – Frank	14 – Blackwell	5 – Chavis	Memorial Gymnasium (2,166); Nashville, TN
February 23, 2020; 5:00 pm, SECN+		Ole Miss	W 82–67	8–19 (5–9)	22 – Frank	10 – Blackwell	4 – Smith	Mizzou Arena (4,027); Columbia, MO
February 27, 2020; 7:00 pm, SECN+		Auburn	L 82–95	8–20 (5–10)	27 – Blackwell	11 – Blackwell	7 – Blackwell	Mizzou Arena (3,540); Columbia, MO
March 1, 2020; 12:40 pm, SECN		at Alabama	L 61–73	8–21 (5–11)	23 – Blackwell	11 – Blackwell	4 – Blackwell	Coleman Coliseum (2,238); Tuscaloosa, AL
SEC Tournament
March 4, 2020; 12:30 pm, SECN	(11)	vs. (14) Ole Miss; First round	W 64–53	9–21	16 – Blackwell	8 – Roundtree	4 – Roundtree	Bon Secours Wellness Arena (5,589); Greenville, SC
March 5, 2020; 7:30 pm, SECN	(11)	vs. (6) Tennessee; Second round	L 51–64	9–22	13 – Blackwell	9 – Blackwell	4 – Blackwell	Bon Secours Wellness Arena; Greenville, SC
*Non-conference game. ^{#}Rankings from AP Poll. (#) Tournament seedings in parentheses. All times are in Central Time.
