= 2019–20 Arkansas Razorbacks women's basketball team =

Intercollegiate basketball season

2019–20 Arkansas Razorbacks women's basketball
- Conference: Southeastern Conference

Ranking
- AP: No. 24
- Record: 24–8 (10–6 SEC)
- Head coach: Mike Neighbors (3rd season)
- Assistant coaches: Todd Schaefer; Pauline Love; Chantel Osahor
- Home arena: Bud Walton Arena

2019–20 SEC women's basketball standings
	Conf.				Overall
Team	W		L	PCT	W		L	PCT
No. 1 South Carolina †	16	–	0	1.000	32	–	1	.970
No. 9 Mississippi State	13	–	3	.813	27	–	6	.818
No. 24 Arkansas	10	–	6	.625	24	–	8	.750
No. 16 Kentucky	10	–	6	.625	22	–	8	.733
No. 19 Texas A&M	10	–	6	.625	22	–	8	.733
Tennessee	10	–	6	.625	21	–	10	.677
LSU	9	–	7	.563	20	–	10	.667
Alabama	8	–	8	.500	18	–	12	.600
Georgia	7	–	9	.438	17	–	14	.548
Florida	6	–	10	.375	15	–	15	.500
Missouri	5	–	11	.313	9	–	22	.290
Vanderbilt	4	–	12	.250	14	–	16	.467
Auburn	4	–	12	.250	11	–	18	.379
Ole Miss	0	–	16	.000	7	–	23	.233
† 2020 SEC tournament winner Rankings from AP poll

The 2019–20 Arkansas Razorbacks women's basketball team represented the University of Arkansas during the 2019–20 NCAA Division I women's basketball season. The Razorbacks, led by third-year head coach Mike Neighbors, played their home games at Bud Walton Arena and competed as members of the Southeastern Conference (SEC).

== Preseason ==
=== SEC media poll ===
The SEC media poll was released on October 15, 2019.

Media poll
Predicted finish	Team
1	South Carolina
2	Texas A&M
3	Mississippi State
4	Kentucky
5	Arkansas
6	Tennessee
7	Auburn
8	LSU
9	Missouri
10	Georgia
11	Alabama
12	Florida
13	Ole Miss
14	Vanderbilt

=== Incoming transfers ===
Name	Pos.	Height	Weight	Year	Hometown	Notes
Destiny Slocum	PG	5'7"	Graduate Student	Mountain View	Transferred from Oregon State after graduating. Will have one year of eligibility beginning immediately in the 2020-21 season.	

=== 2020 recruiting class ===
College recruiting information
Name	Hometown	School	Height	Weight	Commit date
Elauna Eaton; G	Helena, Arkansas	Nettleton High School	6 ft 0 in (1.83 m)	N/A	
Elauna Eaton; G	Recruit ratings: ESPN:				
Destinee McGhee; F	Madison, Alabama	Madison Academy	6 ft 2 in (1.88 m)	N/A	
Destinee McGhee; F	Recruit ratings: ESPN:				
Rylee Langerman; G	Del City, Oklahoma	Christian Heritage High School	5 ft 9 in (1.75 m)	N/A	
Rylee Langerman; G	Recruit ratings: ESPN:				
Overall recruit ranking:
Note: In many cases, Scout, Rivals, 247Sports, On3, and ESPN may conflict in their listings of height and weight.; In these cases, the average was taken. ESPN grades are on a 100-point scale.; Sources: "2020 Arkansas Commits". Rivals.; "2020 Team Ranking". Rivals.

== Roster ==
2019–20 Arkansas Razorbacks women's basketball team
Players
Coaches

Pos.	#	Name	Height	Year	Previous school	Hometown
G	0	A'Tyanna Gaulden	5 ft 7 in (1.7 m)	RS Jr	Americus Sumter HS; Florida State	Ocilla, GA
F	1	Marquesha Davis	6 ft 0 in (1.83 m)	Fr	Springdale HS	Springdale, AR
G	2	Alexis Tolefree	5 ft 8 in (1.73 m)	Sr	Conway HS; Jones County JC	Conway, AR
F	4	Erynn Barnum	6 ft 2 in (1.88 m)	RS Fr	Little Rock Central HS	Little Rock, AR
F/C	10	Kiara Williams	6 ft 1 in (1.85 m)	Sr	Little Rock Central HS	Little Rock, AR
G	13	Grayce Spangler	5 ft 11 in (1.8 m)	Jr	Fayetteville HS	Fayetteville, AR
G	14	Jailyn Mason	5 ft 9 in (1.75 m)	Sr	William Mason HS	Mason, OH
G	22	Avery Hughes	5 ft 7 in (1.7 m)	Fr	Bentonville HS	Bentonville, AR
G	23	Amber Ramirez	5 ft 9 in (1.75 m)	RS Jr	Karen Wagner HS; TCU	San Antonio, TX
F	24	Taylah Thomas	6 ft 1 in (1.85 m)	Jr	Mansfield Timberview HS	Arlington, TX
C	25	Destinee Oberg	6 ft 3 in (1.91 m)	Fr	Academy of Holy Angels	Burnsville, MN
F	30	Macy Weaver	6 ft 3 in (1.91 m)	Jr	Stillman Valley HS	Davis Junction, IL
G	33	Chelsea Dungee	5 ft 11 in (1.8 m)	RS Jr	Sapulpa HS; Oklahoma	Sapulpa, OK
F	35	Ginger Reece	5 ft 10 in (1.78 m)	Fr	Eisenhower HS	Lawton, OK
G	43	Makayla Daniels	5 ft 8 in (1.73 m)	Fr	Frederich HS	Frederick, MD
G	52	Rokia Doumbia	5 ft 9 in (1.75 m)	So	IMG Academy	Bradenton, FL

Head coach

- Mike Neighbors (Arkansas)

Assistant coach(es)

- Todd Schaefer (Thomas More)
- Pauline Love (Southern Miss)
- Chantel Osahor (Washington)

Legend

- (C) Team captain
- (S) Suspended
- (I) Ineligible
- (W) Walk-on
- Injured
- Current redshirt

Roster

== Rankings ==
Ranking movements Legend: ██ Increase in ranking ██ Decrease in ranking RV = Received votes
	Week																				
Poll	Pre	1	2	3	4	5	6	7	8	9	10	11	12	13	14	15	16	17	18	19	Final
AP	22	22	23	20	25	23	21	21	20	21	23	21	25	25	23	22					
Coaches	22	22	22	18	24	23	20	20	20	21	23	20	25	25	RV						

^Coaches' Poll did not release a second poll at the same time as the AP.

== Schedule ==
Date time, TV	Rank^{#}	Opponent^{#}	Result	Record	High points	High rebounds	High assists	Site (attendance) city, state
Exhibition
October 24, 2019*; 7:00 pm		Pittsburg State	W 97–63		23 – Dungee	7 – Tied	4 – Ramirez	Bud Walton Arena (1,390); Fayetteville, AR
October 30, 2019*; 7:00 pm	No. 22	Oklahoma City	W 77–62		31 – Dungee	6 – Dungee	3 – Dungee	Bud Walton Arena (1,597); Fayetteville, AR
Non-conference regular season
November 8, 2019*; 10:30 am, SECN+	No. 22	New Orleans	W 82–52	1–0	22 – Dungee	21 – Thomas	5 – Tied	Bud Walton Arena (6,801); Fayetteville, AR
November 11, 2019*; 7:00 pm, SECN+	No. 23	McNeese State	W 101–58	2–0	19 – Dungee	11 – Thomas	4 – Daniels	Bud Walton Arena (1,238); Fayetteville, AR
November 14, 2019*; 7:00 pm, SECN+	No. 23	Oral Roberts	W 96–64	3–0	27 – Daniels	6 – Dungee	6 – Dungee	Bud Walton Arena (1,430); Fayetteville, AR
November 17, 2019*; 1:00 pm	No. 23	Stony Brook	W 88–58	4–0	26 – Ramirez	9 – Tied	3 – Tied	Bud Walton Arena (2,045); Fayetteville, AR
November 20, 2019*; 7:00 pm, SECN+	No. 20	Belmont	W 91–60	5–0	21 – Tied	8 – Barnum	4 – Tolefree	Bud Walton Arena (1,669); Fayetteville, AR
November 24, 2019*; 4:00 pm	No. 20	at California	L 80–84	5–1	24 – Dungee	8 – Thomas	6 – Gaulden	Haas Pavilion (1,032); Berkeley, CA
November 29, 2019*; 3:00 pm	No. 25	vs. Fordham; Bahamas Hoopfest	W 71–59	6–1	24 – Dungee	13 – Thomas	4 – Gaulden	Kendal Isaacs Gymnasium; Nassau, Bahamas
November 30, 2019*; 6:00 pm	No. 25	vs. Wisconsin; Bahamas Hoopfest	W 68–64	7–1	27 – Dungee	9 – Ramirez	3 – Gaulden	Kendal Isaacs Gymnasium (350); Nassau, Bahamas
December 7, 2019*; 2:00 pm, SECN+	No. 23	Kansas State; Big 12/SEC Women's Challenge	W 81–72	8–1	32 – Dungee	7 – Tied	5 – Ramirez	Bud Walton Arena (2,168); Fayetteville, AR
December 11, 2019*; 6:00 pm, SECN	No. 21	Tulsa	W 91–41	9–1	20 – Tolefree	12 – Tied	4 – Tied	Bud Walton Arena (1,357); Fayetteville, AR
December 15, 2019*; 2:00 pm, SECN+	No. 21	Northwestern State	W 99–39	10–1	21 – Ramirez	8 – Barnum	6 – Gaulden	Bud Walton Arena (2,945); Fayetteville, AR
December 21, 2019*; 1:00 pm	No. 21	vs. Little Rock	W 86–53	11–1	21 – Tied	8 – Dungee	3 – Tied	Simmons Bank Arena (5,540); North Little Rock, AR
December 29, 2019*; 2:00 pm, SECN+	No. 20	UT Martin	W 96–46	12–1	23 – Tolefree	9 – Thomas	6 – Daniels	Bud Walton Arena (3,484); Fayetteville, AR
SEC regular season
January 2, 2020; 8:00 pm, SECN+	No. 20	No. 11 Texas A&M	L 77–84	12–2 (0–1)	20 – Dungee	5 – Doumbia	3 – Tied	Bud Walton Arena (4,243); Fayetteville, AR
January 5, 2020; 5:00 pm, SECN	No. 20	at Auburn	W 86–70	13–2 (1–1)	25 – Ramirez	8 – Tolefree	5 – Gaulden	Auburn Arena (1,702); Auburn, AL
January 9, 2020; 7:00 pm, SECN+	No. 21	at No. 4 South Carolina	L 82–91	13–3 (1–2)	22 – Tolefree	6 – Doumbia	7 – Gaulden	Colonial Life Arena (10,234); Columbia, SC
January 12, 2020; 2:00 pm, SECN	No. 21	Missouri	W 90–73	14–3 (2–2)	38 – Dungee	11 – Thomas	4 – Gaulden	Bud Walton Arena (4,172); Fayetteville, AR
January 19, 2020; 5:00 pm, SECN	No. 23	at Vanderbilt	W 100–66	15–3 (3–2)	25 – Tolefree	10 – Doumbia	6 – Gaulden	Memorial Gymnasium (2,734); Nashville, TN
January 23, 2020; 6:00 pm, SECN	No. 21	Georgia	L 55–64	15–4 (3–3)	14 – Barnum	7 – Tolefree	2 – Tied	Bud Walton Arena (1,822); Fayetteville, AR
January 26, 2020; 2:00 pm, SECN+	No. 21	Florida	W 79–57	16–4 (4–3)	19 – Daniels	7 – Thomas	5 – Gaulden	Bud Walton Arena (4,020); Fayetteville, AR
January 30, 2020; 7:00 pm, SECN+	No. 25	at Alabama	W 66–48	17–4 (5–3)	22 – Ramirez	7 – Tolefree	4 – Daniels	Coleman Coliseum (1,857); Tuscaloosa, AL
February 2, 2020; 4:00 pm, SECN	No. 25	at Missouri	W 85–81 ^{OT}	18–4 (6–3)	35 – Tolefree	9 – Thomas	2 – Tied	Mizzou Arena (3,531); Columbia, MO
February 6, 2020; 7:30 pm, SECN	No. 25	No. 1 South Carolina	L 65–86	18–5 (6–4)	16 – Dungee	7 – Dungee	4 – Ramirez	Bud Walton Arena (2,452); Fayetteville, AR
February 9, 2020; 3:00 pm, ESPN2	No. 25	No. 15 Kentucky	W 103–85	19–5 (7–4)	30 – Tolefree	7 – Tied	5 – Tied	Bud Walton Arena (5,638); Fayetteville, AR
February 16, 2020; 2:00 pm, SECN	No. 23	at Ole Miss	W 108–64	20–5 (8–4)	19 – Tolefree	11 – Doumbia	6 – Doumbia	The Pavilion at Ole Miss (1,383); Oxford, MS
February 20, 2020; 6:00 pm, SECN	No. 22	Tennessee	W 83–75	21–5 (9–4)	29 – Ramirez	7 – Tolefree	4 – Gaulden	Bud Walton Arena (3,023); Fayetteville, AR
February 23, 2020; 1:00 pm, SECN	No. 22	at Florida	L 80–83	21–6 (9–5)	17 – Tied	7 – Tied	4 – Gaulden	O'Connell Center (1,749); Gainesville, FL
February 27, 2020; 8:00 pm, SECN		at No. 10 Mississippi State	L 83–92	21–7 (9–6)	30 – Tolefree	8 – Tolefree	5 – Daniels	Humphrey Coliseum (7,256); Starkville, MS
March 1, 2020; 1:00 pm, SECN+		LSU	W 75–71	22–7 (10–6)	17 – Tolefree	8 – Thomas	4 – Ramirez	Bud Walton Arena (4,402); Fayetteville, AR
SEC Tournament
March 5, 2020; 1:30 pm, SECN	(5) No. 25	vs. (13) Auburn; Second round	W 90–68	23–7	30 – Tolefree	6 – Tied	6 – Gaulden	Bon Secours Wellness Arena; Greenville, SC
March 6, 2020; 1:30 pm, SECN	(5) No. 25	vs. (4) No. 15 Texas A&M; Quarterfinals	W 67–66	24–7	13 – Daniels	5 – Dungee	3 – Tolefree	Bon Secours Wellness Arena; Greenville, SC
March 7, 2020; 4:00 pm, ESPNU	(5) No. 25	vs. (1) No. 1 South Carolina; Semifinals	L 64–90	24–8	18 – Ramirez	6 – Thomas	3 – Ramirez	Bon Secours Wellness Arena; Greenville, SC
*Non-conference game. ^{#}Rankings from AP Poll. (#) Tournament seedings in parentheses. All times are in Central Time.

== See also ==
- 2019–20 Arkansas Razorbacks men's basketball team
