= 2019–20 Kentucky Wildcats women's basketball team =

Intercollegiate basketball season

2019–20 Kentucky Wildcats women's basketball
- Conference: Southeastern Conference

Ranking
- Coaches: No. 19
- AP: No. 16
- Record: 22–8 (10–6 SEC)
- Head coach: Matthew Mitchell (13th season)
- Assistant coaches: Kyra Elzy; Niya Butts; Amber Smith
- Home arena: Memorial Coliseum; Rupp Arena

2019–20 SEC women's basketball standings
	Conf.				Overall
Team	W		L	PCT	W		L	PCT
No. 1 South Carolina †	16	–	0	1.000	32	–	1	.970
No. 9 Mississippi State	13	–	3	.813	27	–	6	.818
No. 24 Arkansas	10	–	6	.625	24	–	8	.750
No. 16 Kentucky	10	–	6	.625	22	–	8	.733
No. 19 Texas A&M	10	–	6	.625	22	–	8	.733
Tennessee	10	–	6	.625	21	–	10	.677
LSU	9	–	7	.563	20	–	10	.667
Alabama	8	–	8	.500	18	–	12	.600
Georgia	7	–	9	.438	17	–	14	.548
Florida	6	–	10	.375	15	–	15	.500
Missouri	5	–	11	.313	9	–	22	.290
Vanderbilt	4	–	12	.250	14	–	16	.467
Auburn	4	–	12	.250	11	–	18	.379
Ole Miss	0	–	16	.000	7	–	23	.233
† 2020 SEC tournament winner Rankings from AP poll

The 2019–20 Kentucky Wildcats women's basketball team represented the University of Kentucky during the 2019–20 NCAA Division I women's basketball season. The Wildcats, led by thirteenth-year head coach Matthew Mitchell, played their home games at Memorial Coliseum and Rupp Arena and competed as members of the Southeastern Conference (SEC).

== Preseason ==
=== SEC media poll ===
The SEC media poll was released on October 15, 2019.

Media poll
Predicted finish	Team
1	South Carolina
2	Texas A&M
3	Mississippi State
4	Kentucky
5	Arkansas
6	Tennessee
7	Auburn
8	LSU
9	Missouri
10	Georgia
11	Alabama
12	Florida
13	Ole Miss
14	Vanderbilt

== Rankings ==
Ranking movements Legend: ██ Increase in ranking ██ Decrease in ranking
	Week																				
Poll	Pre	1	2	3	4	5	6	7	8	9	10	11	12	13	14	15	16	17	18	19	Final
AP	13	13	13	14	15	14	15	14	13												
Coaches	16	16	14	14	14																

^Coaches' Poll did not release a second poll at the same time as the AP.

== Roster ==
2019–20 Kentucky Wildcats women's basketball team
Players
Coaches

Pos.	#	Name	Height	Year	Previous school	Hometown
G	1	Sabrina Haines	5 ft 10 in (1.78 m)	RS Sr	Desert Vista; Arizona State	Phoenix, AZ
F	3	KeKe McKinney	6 ft 1 in (1.85 m)	Jr	Fulton (TN)	Knoxville, TN
G	5	Blair Green	6 ft 0 in (1.83 m)	So	Harlan County	Harlan, KY
G	10	Rhyne Howard	6 ft 2 in (1.88 m)	So	Bradley Central	Cleveland, TN
F	11	Deasia Merrill	6 ft 1 in (1.85 m)	Fr	Villa Rica	Villa Rica, GA
G	12	Amanda Paschal	5 ft 7 in (1.7 m)	RS Sr	Chipley; Gulf Coast State	Brooklyn, NY
F	14	Tatyana Wyatt	6 ft 2 in (1.88 m)	Jr	Columbus	Columbus, GA
G	15	Chasity Patterson (redshirt)	5 ft 5 in (1.65 m)	So	North Shore; Texas	Houston, TX
F	21	Ogechi Anyagaligbo	6 ft 1 in (1.85 m)	RS Sr	Miami Country Day; Stony Brook	Miami, FL
G	23	Kameron Roach	5 ft 6 in (1.68 m)	Jr	Lower Richland	Hopkins, SC
G	32	Jaida Roper	5 ft 6 in (1.68 m)	Sr	Houston	Memphis, TN
G	34	Emma King	5 ft 10 in (1.78 m)	Fr	Lincoln County	Stanford, KY
C	44	Nae Nae Cole	6 ft 3 in (1.91 m)	RS Sr	Paul VI; NC State	Gainesville, VA
F	44	Dre'una Edwards (redshirt)	6 ft 2 in (1.88 m)	Sr	Liberty; Utah	Las Vegas, NV

Head coach

- Matthew Mitchell (Mississippi State)

Assistant coach(es)

- Kyra Elzy (Tennessee)
- Niya Butts (Tennessee)
- Amber Smith (Kentucky)
- Lin Dunn (UT Martin)

Legend

- (C) Team captain
- (S) Suspended
- (I) Ineligible
- (W) Walk-on
- Injured
- Current redshirt

Roster
Last update: November 7, 2019

== Schedule ==
Date time, TV	Rank^{#}	Opponent^{#}	Result	Record	High points	High rebounds	High assists	Site (attendance) city, state
Exhibition
October 30, 2019*; 7:00 pm	No. 13	Southern Indiana	W 80–44		20 – Howard	7 – McKinney	6 – Roper	Memorial Coliseum (974); Lexington, KY
Non-conference regular season
November 5, 2019*; 7:00 pm, SECN+	No. 13	Mount St. Mary's	W 67–44	1–0	14 – Howard	11 – Howard	5 – Howard	Memorial Coliseum (3,575); Lexington, KY
November 10, 2019*; 3:00 pm	No. 13	at Middle Tennessee	W 67–52	2–0	16 – Paschal	7 – Anyagaligbo	4 – McKinney	Murphy Center (3,809); Murfreesboro, TN
November 13, 2019*; 7:00 pm, SECN+	No. 13	Stetson	W 67–48	3–0	24 – Howard	10 – McKinney	8 – Roper	Memorial Coliseum (3,573); Lexington, KY
November 16, 2019*; 5:00 pm, ACCNX	No. 13	at Virginia	W 50–47	4–0	17 – Haines	11 – Howard	2 – Tied	John Paul Jones Arena (2,507); Charlottesville, VA
November 21, 2019*; 7:00 pm, SECN+	No. 13	Morehead State	W 79–54	5–0	24 – Howard	8 – Wyatt	8 – Paschal	Memorial Coliseum (3,932); Lexington, KY
November 26, 2019*; 7:00 pm, SECN+	No. 14	Grambling State	W 81–35	6–0	27 – Howard	6 – McKinney	7 – Roper	Memorial Coliseum (3,710); Lexington, KY
December 1, 2019*; 4:00 pm, SECN	No. 14	Austin Peay	W 89–52	7–0	14 – Howard	9 – Haines	6 – Paschal	Memorial Coliseum (3,902); Lexington, KY
December 4, 2019*; 11:00 am, SECN+	No. 15	Charlotte	W 86–39	8–0	29 – Howard	7 – Howard	5 – Paschal	Memorial Coliseum (4,646); Lexington, KY
December 8, 2019*; 2:00 pm, SECN+	No. 15	Samford	W 79–49	9–0	30 – Howard	6 – Tied	7 – Roper	Memorial Coliseum (3,795); Lexington, KY
December 11, 2019*; 7:00 pm	No. 14	Winthrop	W 91–36	10–0	30 – Roper	6 – Wyatt	5 – Paschal	Rupp Arena (3,779); Lexington, KY
December 15, 2019*; 1:00 pm, ESPN	No. 14	No. 7 Louisville	L 66–67	10–1	26 – Howard	5 – Wyatt	4 – Haines	Rupp Arena (11,256); Lexington, KY
December 21, 2019*; 7:00 pm	No. 14	at California	W 63–61	11–1	29 – Howard	8 – Wyatt	3 – Tied	Haas Pavilion (1,426); Berkeley, CA
SEC regular season
January 2, 2020; 7:40 pm, SECN+	No. 13	at No. 4 South Carolina	L 72–99	11–2 (0–1)	28 – Howard	6 – Tied	2 – Tied	Colonial Life Arena (12,261); Columbia, SC
January 5, 2020; 4:00 pm, ESPN2	No. 13	No. 22 Tennessee; Rivalry	W 80–76	12–2 (1–1)	37 – Howard	9 – Howard	5 – Howard	Memorial Coliseum (5,516); Lexington, KY
January 9, 2020; 8:00 pm, SECN+	No. 14	at Alabama	W 81–71	13–2 (2–1)	43 – Howard	6 – Howard	5 – Tied	Coleman Coliseum (2,322); Tuscaloosa, AL
January 12, 2020; 12:00 pm, ESPNU	No. 14	at Florida	W 65–45	14–2 (3–1)	22 – Howard	7 – Wyatt	2 – Tied	O'Connell Center (1,431); Gainesville, FL
January 16, 2020; 6:30 pm, SECN	No. 11	No. 12 Texas A&M	W 76–54	15–2 (4–1)	24 – Howard	11 – Howard	4 – Howard	Memorial Coliseum (3,886); Lexington, KY
January 19, 2020; 2:00 pm, SECN	No. 11	at LSU	L 59–65	15–3 (4–2)	26 – Howard	12 – Howard	2 – Tied	Pete Maravich Assembly Center (2,537); Baton Rouge, LA
January 27, 2020; 7:00 pm, SECN	No. 13	Auburn	W 68–61	16–3 (5–2)	17 – Haines	8 – McKinney	4 – Tied	Memorial Coliseum (3,803); Lexington, KY
January 30, 2020; 7:00 pm, SECN	No. 13	at Missouri	W 62–47	17–3 (6–2)	18 – Paschal	7 – Green	3 – Tied	Mizzou Arena (3,405); Columbia, MO
February 2, 2020; 1:00 pm, SECN	No. 13	Florida	L 62–70	17–4 (6–3)	15 – Roper	8 – Paschal	2 – Tied	Memorial Coliseum (5,087); Lexington, KY
February 6, 2020; 7:00 pm, SECN+	No. 15	Alabama	W 66–62	18–4 (7–3)	14 – Haines	6 – Tied	5 – Roper	Memorial Coliseum (3,739); Lexington, KY
February 9, 2020; 4:00 pm, ESPN2	No. 15	at No. 25 Arkansas	L 85–103	18–5 (7–4)	32 – Patterson	4 – Tied	6 – Roper	Bud Walton Arena (5,638); Fayetteville, AR
February 16, 2020; 5:00 pm, ESPN2	No. 18	No. 6 Mississippi State	W 73–62	19–5 (8–4)	26 – Howard	10 – Howard	5 – Roper	Memorial Coliseum (5,317); Lexington, KY
February 20, 2020; 8:00 pm, SECN+	No. 14	at Ole Miss	W 94–52	20–5 (9–4)	21 – Howard	7 – Howard	6 – Tied	The Pavilion at Ole Miss (1,180); Oxford, MS
February 23, 2020; 2:00 pm, SECN/ESPN2	No. 14	No. 1 South Carolina	L 58–67	20–6 (9–5)	24 – Howard	11 – Howard	3 – Howard	Memorial Coliseum (7,174); Lexington, KY
February 27, 2020; 7:00 pm, SECN+	No. 15	Georgia	W 88–77	21–6 (10–5)	25 – Howard	5 – Roper	5 – Tied	Memorial Coliseum (4,163); Lexington, KY
March 1, 2020; 2:05 pm, SECN+	No. 15	at Vanderbilt	L 64–70	21–7 (10–6)	26 – Howard	7 – McKinney	3 – Anyagaligbo	Memorial Gymnasium (3,081); Nashville, TN
SEC Tournament
March 6, 2020; 8:30 pm, SECN	(3) No. 16	vs. (6) Tennessee; Quarterfinals / Rivalry	W 86–65	22–7	24 – Howard	8 – Howard	5 – Roper	Bon Secours Wellness Arena; Greenville, SC
March 7, 2020; 7:30 pm, ESPNU	(3) No. 16	vs. (2) No. 9 Mississippi State; Semifinals	L 59–77	22–8	26 – Howard	7 – Howard	2 – Howard	Bon Secours Wellness Arena; Greenville, SC
*Non-conference game. ^{#}Rankings from AP Poll. (#) Tournament seedings in parentheses. All times are in Eastern Time.
