= 2019–20 Alabama Crimson Tide women's basketball team =

Intercollegiate basketball season

2019–20 Alabama Crimson Tide women's basketball
- Conference: Southeastern Conference
- Record: 18–12 (8–8 SEC)
- Head coach: Kristy Curry (7th season)
- Assistant coaches: Tiffany Coppage; Kelly Curry; Adrian Walters
- Home arena: Coleman Coliseum

2019–20 SEC women's basketball standings
| | Conf. | | | | Overall |
| Team | W | | L | PCT | W | | L | PCT |
|---|---|---|---|---|---|---|---|---|
| No. 1 South Carolina † | 16 | – | 0 | 1.000 | 32 | – | 1 | .970 |
| No. 9 Mississippi State | 13 | – | 3 | .813 | 27 | – | 6 | .818 |
| No. 24 Arkansas | 10 | – | 6 | .625 | 24 | – | 8 | .750 |
| No. 16 Kentucky | 10 | – | 6 | .625 | 22 | – | 8 | .733 |
| No. 19 Texas A&M | 10 | – | 6 | .625 | 22 | – | 8 | .733 |
| Tennessee | 10 | – | 6 | .625 | 21 | – | 10 | .677 |
| LSU | 9 | – | 7 | .563 | 20 | – | 10 | .667 |
| Alabama | 8 | – | 8 | .500 | 18 | – | 12 | .600 |
| Georgia | 7 | – | 9 | .438 | 17 | – | 14 | .548 |
| Florida | 6 | – | 10 | .375 | 15 | – | 15 | .500 |
| Missouri | 5 | – | 11 | .313 | 9 | – | 22 | .290 |
| Vanderbilt | 4 | – | 12 | .250 | 14 | – | 16 | .467 |
| Auburn | 4 | – | 12 | .250 | 11 | – | 18 | .379 |
| Ole Miss | 0 | – | 16 | .000 | 7 | – | 23 | .233 |
† 2020 SEC tournament winner Rankings from AP poll

The 2019–20 Alabama Crimson Tide women's basketball team represented the University of Alabama during the 2019–20 NCAA Division I women's basketball season. The Crimson Tide, led by seventh-year head coach Kristy Curry, played their home games at Coleman Coliseum and competed as members of the Southeastern Conference (SEC).

== Departures ==
| Name | Number | Pos. | Height | Year | Hometown | Notes |
|---|---|---|---|---|---|---|
| Taniyah Worth | 0 | G | 6'1" | Freshman | Flowery Branch, GA | Transferred to Georgia State |
| Taylor Berry | 10 | G | 5'9" | Senior | New Orleans, LA | Graduated |
| Shaquera Wade | 23 | G | 6'0" | Senior | Huntsville, AL | Graduated |
| Grace Pelphrey | 34 | G | 6'1" | Freshman | Tuscaloosa, AL | Transferred to Tennessee Tech |

== Roster ==
2019–20 Alabama Crimson Tide women's basketball team
Players
Coaches

| Pos. | # | Name | Height | Year | Previous school | Hometown |
|---|---|---|---|---|---|---|
| G | 0 | Ahriahna Grizzle | 5 ft 9 in (1.75 m) | Fr | Bill Crothers Secondary School | Toronto, Canada |
| G | 1 | Megan Abrams | 5 ft 9 in (1.75 m) | So | Lafayette Christian Academy | Lafayette, LA |
| G | 2 | Amber Richardson | 6 ft 0 in (1.83 m) | RS Sr | Southeast Raleigh Magnet HS | Garner, NC |
| G | 3 | Jordan Lewis | 5 ft 7 in (1.7 m) | RS Jr | Lake Highland Prep | Windermere, FL |
| G | 4 | Cierra Johnson | 5 ft 10 in (1.78 m) | Sr | Shelton State CC | Mobile, AL |
| G | 5 | Hannah Barber | 5 ft 6 in (1.68 m) | So | Homewood HS | Homewood, AL |
| G | 11 | Destiny Rice | 5 ft 8 in (1.73 m) | Fr | North Caddo Magnet HS | Shreveport, LA |
| F | 12 | Allie Craig Cruce | 6 ft 1 in (1.85 m) | So | Lauderdale County HS | Killen, AL |
| F | 22 | Ariyah Copeland | 6 ft 3 in (1.91 m) | Jr | Columbus HS | Columbus, GA |
| G | 23 | Brittany Davis | 5 ft 9 in (1.75 m) | So | Gulf Coast State College | Manchester, GA |
| G | 24 | De'sha Benjamin | 6 ft 0 in (1.83 m) | So | Lucy Craft Laney HS | Augusta, GA |
| F | 25 | Ashley Knight | 6 ft 5 in (1.96 m) | Sr | Lyndon B. Johnson HS | Austin, TX |
| F | 40 | Jasmine Walker | 6 ft 3 in (1.91 m) | Jr | Jefferson Davis HS | Montgomery, AL |
| C | 42 | Shelby Gibson | 6 ft 3 in (1.91 m) | RS Jr | Ole Miss | Murfreesboro, TN |

Head coach

- Kristy Curry (Louisiana–Monroe)

Assistant coach(es)

- Tiffany Coppage (Missouri State)
- Kelly Curry (Texas A&M)
- Adrian Walters (Saint Francis (PA))

Legend

- (C) Team captain
- (S) Suspended
- (I) Ineligible
- (W) Walk-on
- Injured
- Current redshirt

Roster
Last update: February 28, 2020

== Preseason ==
=== SEC media poll ===
The SEC media poll was released on October 15, 2019.

Media poll
| Predicted finish | Team |
| 1 | South Carolina |
| 2 | Texas A&M |
| 3 | Mississippi State |
| 4 | Kentucky |
| 5 | Arkansas |
| 6 | Tennessee |
| 7 | Auburn |
| 8 | LSU |
| 9 | Missouri |
| 10 | Georgia |
| 11 | Alabama |
| 12 | Florida |
| 13 | Ole Miss |
| 14 | Vanderbilt |

== Schedule ==
| Date time, TV | Rank^{#} | Opponent^{#} | Result | Record | High points | High rebounds | High assists | Site (attendance) city, state |
Exhibition
| October 27, 2019*; 2:30 pm | | Auburn Montgomery | W 105–16 | | 19 – Davis | 8 – Cruce | 3 – Lewis | Coleman Coliseum (9,293); Tuscaloosa, AL |
Non-conference regular season
| November 6, 2019*; 7:00 pm, SECN+ | | Hampton | L 61–64 | 0–1 | 14 – Lewis | 11 – Copeland | 6 – Lewis | Coleman Coliseum (1,871); Tuscaloosa, AL |
| November 12, 2019*; 6:00 pm, ACCNX | | at Clemson | W 67–54 | 1–1 | 21 – Johnson | 8 – Johnson | 6 – Lewis | Littlejohn Coliseum (1,233); Clemson, SC |
| November 17, 2019*; 2:00 pm, SECN+ | | Mercer | W 111–56 | 2–1 | 16 – Benjamin | 10 – Benjamin | 5 – Tied | Coleman Coliseum (1,885); Tuscaloosa, AL |
| November 21, 2019*; 7:00 pm, ESPN+ | | at South Alabama | W 74–62 | 3–1 | 16 – Johnson | 11 – Walker | 3 – Tied | Mitchell Center (1,270); Mobile, AL |
| November 24, 2019*; 4:00 pm | | at Tulane | W 66–56 | 4–1 | 21 – Lewis | 8 – Johnson | 4 – Abrams | Devlin Fieldhouse (657); New Orleans, LA |
| November 29, 2019*; 10:00 pm | | vs. Northern Iowa; South Point Thanksgiving Shootout | W 87–77 | 5–1 | 23 – Lewis | 9 – Walker | 6 – Johnson | South Point Hotel, Casino & Spa; Enterprise, NV |
| November 30, 2019*; 10:00 pm | | vs. USC; South Point Thanksgiving Shootout | L 57–60 | 5–2 | 13 – Benjamin | 6 – Tied | 1 – Tied | South Point Hotel, Casino & Spa; Enterprise, NV |
| December 5, 2019*; 6:00 pm, SECN | | Iowa State; Big 12/SEC Women's Challenge | L 66–75 | 5–3 | 20 – Lewis | 6 – Walker | 4 – Abrams | Coleman Coliseum (1,915); Tuscaloosa, AL |
| December 8, 2019*; 2:00 pm, SECN+ | | Colgate | W 72–52 | 6–3 | 16 – Walker | 11 – Walker | 4 – Abrams | Coleman Coliseum (1,787); Tuscaloosa, AL |
| December 15, 2019*; 2:00 pm, SECN+ | | North Carolina | W 83–77 | 7–3 | 23 – Davis | 9 – Copeland | 4 – Lewis | Coleman Coliseum (2,235); Tuscaloosa, AL |
| December 17, 2019*; 11:30 am, SECN+ | | Bethune–Cookman | W 60–49 | 8–3 | 17 – Lewis | 11 – Benjamin | 4 – Lewis | Coleman Coliseum (4,105); Tuscaloosa, AL |
| December 20, 2019*; 7:00 pm, SECN+ | | Radford | W 85–51 | 9–3 | 14 – Walker | 9 – Walker | 4 – Lewis | Coleman Coliseum (1,898); Tuscaloosa, AL |
| December 29, 2019*; 2:00 pm, SECN+ | | Southeastern Louisiana | W 87–50 | 10–3 | 16 – Lewis | 8 – Johnson | 4 – Johnson | Coleman Coliseum (1,973); Tuscaloosa, AL |
SEC regular season
| January 2, 2020; 7:40 pm, SECN+ | | at LSU | L 60–71 | 10–4 (0–1) | 16 – Walker | 11 – Walker | 2 – Tied | Pete Maravich Assembly Center (1,667); Baton Rouge, LA |
| January 5, 2020; 5:00 pm, SECN | | No. 4 South Carolina | L 78–93 | 10–5 (0–2) | 21 – Lewis | 7 – Tied | 6 – Lewis | Coleman Coliseum (2,168); Tuscaloosa, AL |
| January 9, 2020; 7:00 pm, SECN+ | | No. 14 Kentucky | L 71–81 | 10–6 (0–3) | 15 – Tied | 8 – Walker | 7 – Lewis | Coleman Coliseum (2,322); Tuscaloosa, AL |
| January 12, 2020; 2:00 pm, SECN+ | | at Auburn | W 75–48 | 11–6 (1–3) | 23 – Walker | 10 – Walker | 5 – Lewis | Auburn Arena (2,833); Auburn, AL |
| January 20, 2020; 6:00 pm, SECN | | at No. 23 Tennessee | L 63–65 | 11–7 (1–4) | 17 – Lewis | 10 – Walker | 4 – Johnson | Thompson–Boling Arena (8,537); Knoxville, TN |
| January 23, 2020; 7:00 pm, SECN+ | | No. 15 Texas A&M | L 74–79 | 11–8 (1–5) | 18 – Walker | 7 – Abrams | 7 – Lewis | Coleman Coliseum (1,826); Tuscaloosa, AL |
| January 26, 2020; 2:00 pm, SECN+ | | Vanderbilt | W 98–61 | 12–8 (2–5) | 15 – Davis | 9 – Benjamin | 4 – Lewis | Coleman Coliseum (2,067); Tuscaloosa, AL |
| January 30, 2020; 7:00 pm, SECN+ | | No. 25 Arkansas | L 48–66 | 12–9 (2–6) | 10 – Benjamin | 12 – Walker | 2 – Tied | Coleman Coliseum (1,857); Tuscaloosa, AL |
| February 2, 2020; 2:00 pm, SECN+ | | at Ole Miss | W 57–56 | 13–9 (3–6) | 11 – Copeland | 8 – Knight | 5 – Lewis | The Pavilion at Ole Miss (1,207); Oxford, MS |
| February 6, 2020; 6:00 pm, SECN+ | | at No. 15 Kentucky | L 62–66 | 13–10 (3–7) | 17 – Walker | 8 – Copeland | 5 – Tied | Memorial Coliseum (3,739); Lexington, KY |
| February 9, 2020; 2:00 pm, SECN | | Auburn | W 68–64 | 14–10 (4–7) | 17 – Copeland | 13 – Copeland | 3 – Tied | Coleman Coliseum (3,188); Tuscaloosa, AL |
| February 16, 2020; 12:00 pm, SECN+ | | at Georgia | L 75–76 ^{OT} | 14–11 (4–8) | 25 – Lewis | 9 – Walker | 4 – Lewis | Stegeman Coliseum (4,569); Athens, GA |
| February 20, 2020; 7:00 pm, SECN+ | | Florida | W 69–62 | 15–11 (5–8) | 16 – Lewis | 9 – Walker | 6 – Lewis | Coleman Coliseum (1,888); Tuscaloosa, AL |
| February 23, 2020; 1:00 pm, ESPN2 | | at No. 9 Mississippi State | W 66–64 | 16–11 (6–8) | 20 – Walker | 7 – Johnson | 8 – Johnson | Humphrey Coliseum (8,083); Starkville, MS |
| February 27, 2020; 6:00 pm, SECN | | at No. 12 Texas A&M | W 76–63 | 17–11 (7–8) | 24 – Walker | 12 – Copeland | 9 – Lewis | Reed Arena (4,061); College Station, TX |
| March 1, 2020; 12:40 pm, SECN+ | | Missouri | W 73–61 | 18–11 (8–8) | 17 – Johnson | 12 – Walker | 5 – Lewis | Coleman Coliseum (2,238); Tuscaloosa, AL |
SEC Tournament
| March 5, 2020; 11:00 am, SECN | (8) | vs. (9) Georgia; Second round | L 61–68 | 18–12 | 15 – Lewis | 6 – Tied | 5 – Johnson | Bon Secours Wellness Arena; Greenville, SC |
*Non-conference game. ^{#}Rankings from AP Poll. (#) Tournament seedings in parentheses. All times are in Central Time.
