= 2019–20 Florida Gators women's basketball team =

Intercollegiate basketball season

2019–20 Florida Gators women's basketball
- Conference: Southeastern Conference
- Record: 15–15 (6–10 SEC)
- Head coach: Cameron Newbauer (3rd season)
- Assistant coaches: Kelly Rae Finley; John McCray; Erika Lang-Montgomery
- Home arena: O'Connell Center

2019–20 SEC women's basketball standings
	Conf.				Overall
Team	W		L	PCT	W		L	PCT
No. 1 South Carolina †	16	–	0	1.000	32	–	1	.970
No. 9 Mississippi State	13	–	3	.813	27	–	6	.818
No. 24 Arkansas	10	–	6	.625	24	–	8	.750
No. 16 Kentucky	10	–	6	.625	22	–	8	.733
No. 19 Texas A&M	10	–	6	.625	22	–	8	.733
Tennessee	10	–	6	.625	21	–	10	.677
LSU	9	–	7	.563	20	–	10	.667
Alabama	8	–	8	.500	18	–	12	.600
Georgia	7	–	9	.438	17	–	14	.548
Florida	6	–	10	.375	15	–	15	.500
Missouri	5	–	11	.313	9	–	22	.290
Vanderbilt	4	–	12	.250	14	–	16	.467
Auburn	4	–	12	.250	11	–	18	.379
Ole Miss	0	–	16	.000	7	–	23	.233
† 2020 SEC tournament winner Rankings from AP poll

The 2019–20 Florida Gators women's basketball team represented the University of Florida during the 2019–20 NCAA Division I women's basketball season. The Gators, led by third-year head coach Cameron Newbauer, played their home games at the O'Connell Center and competed as members of the Southeastern Conference (SEC).

== Preseason ==
=== SEC media poll ===
The SEC media poll was released on October 15, 2019.

Media poll
Predicted finish	Team
1	South Carolina
2	Texas A&M
3	Mississippi State
4	Kentucky
5	Arkansas
6	Tennessee
7	Auburn
8	LSU
9	Missouri
10	Georgia
11	Alabama
12	Florida
13	Ole Miss
14	Vanderbilt

== Schedule ==
Date time, TV	Rank^{#}	Opponent^{#}	Result	Record	High points	High rebounds	High assists	Site (attendance) city, state
Exhibition
October 30, 2019*; 6:00 pm		Valdosta State	W 84–38		20 – Smith	10 – Johnson	5 – Smith	O'Connell Center (659); Gainesville, FL
Non-conference regular season
November 5, 2019*; 7:00 pm		at Grambling State	W 72–65	1–0	16 – Tied	9 – Smith	8 – Briggs	Fredrick C. Hobdy Assembly Center; Grambling, LA
November 10, 2019*; 3:30 pm, SECN+		Longwood	W 71–54	2–0	16 – Briggs	12 – Rickards	5 – Smith	O'Connell Center (1,209); Gainesville, FL
November 16, 2019*; 2:00 pm, SECN+		Samford	W 84–48	3–0	19 – Briggs	9 – Briggs	4 – Smith	O'Connell Center (1,080); Gainesville, FL
November 18, 2019*; 10:30 am, SECN+		Presbyterian	W 60–36	4–0	11 – Tied	9 – Williams	4 – Johnson	O'Connell Center (1,629); Gainesville, FL
November 22, 2019*; 6:00 pm, SECN+		No. 18 Indiana	L 49–73	4–1	18 – Smith	7 – Williams	2 – Smith	O'Connell Center (1,224); Gainesville, FL
November 26, 2019*; 6:00 pm, SECN+		No. 12 Florida State	L 55–66	4–2	14 – Smith	11 – Williams	3 – Johnson	O'Connell Center (1,469); Gainesville, FL
December 1, 2019*; 2:00 pm, SECN+		Florida A&M	W 84–40	5–2	22 – Williams	19 – Williams	5 – Smith	O'Connell Center (1,305); Gainesville, FL
December 5, 2019*; 8:00 pm		at Prairie View A&M	W 51–44	6–2	16 – Williams	7 – Smith	5 – Smith	William J. Nicks Building (500); Prairie View, TX
December 8, 2019*; 3:00 pm, ESPN+		at Kansas; Big 12/SEC Women's Challenge	L 66–76	6–3	18 – Smith	7 – Williams	3 – Briggs	Allen Fieldhouse (1,625); Lawrence, KS
December 17, 2019*; 7:00 pm, SECN		Mercer	W 71–50	7–3	21 – Smith	11 – Briggs	5 – Smith	O'Connell Center (1,017); Gainesville, FL
December 20, 2019*; 2:30 pm		vs. Xavier; West Palm Beach Invitational	W 67–64	8–3	25 – Williams	9 – Briggs	5 – Rickards	Student Life Center (250); West Palm Beach, FL
December 21, 2019*; 1:00 pm		vs. Wake Forest; West Palm Beach Invitational	L 68–73	8–4	23 – Briggs	5 – Tied	3 – Tied	Student Life Center (200); West Palm Beach, FL
December 29, 2019*; 2:00 pm, SECN+		Davidson	W 55–50	9–4	16 – Johnson	15 – Williams	2 – Smith	O'Connell Center (1,332); Gainesville, FL
SEC regular season
January 2, 2020; 8:10 pm, SECN+		at No. 15 Mississippi State	L 47–93	9–5 (0–1)	15 – Tied	5 – Williams	2 – Tied	Humphrey Coliseum (7,427); Starkville, MS
January 5, 2020; 12:00 pm, ESPNU		Vanderbilt	W 68–60	10–5 (1–1)	19 – Briggs	11 – Williams	5 – Smith	O'Connell Center (1,229); Gainesville, FL
January 9, 2020; 7:00 pm, SECN+		at Auburn	W 83–63	11–5 (2–1)	19 – Briggs	4 – Tied	3 – Tied	Auburn Arena (1,621); Auburn, AL
January 12, 2020; 12:00 pm, ESPNU		No. 14 Kentucky	L 45–65	11–6 (2–2)	16 – Smith	5 – Tied	2 – Smith	O'Connell Center (1,431); Gainesville, FL
January 16, 2020; 6:00 pm, SECN+		No. 24 Tennessee	L 50–78	11–7 (2–3)	11 – Tied	5 – Tied	3 – Briggs	O'Connell Center (1,629); Gainesville, FL
January 19, 2020; 4:00 pm, SECN		at No. 12 Texas A&M	L 42–69	11–8 (2–4)	14 – Briggs	11 – Briggs	3 – Johnson	Reed Arena (4,081); College Station, TX
January 26, 2020; 3:00 pm, SECN+		at No. 21 Arkansas	L 57–79	11–9 (2–5)	17 – Briggs	8 – Tied	4 – Moore	Bud Walton Arena (4,020); Fayetteville, AR
January 30, 2020; 6:00 pm, SECN+		LSU	L 68–77	11–10 (2–6)	16 – Briggs	6 – Briggs	6 – Smith	O'Connell Center (1,018); Gainesville, FL
February 2, 2020; 1:00 pm, SECN		at No. 13 Kentucky	W 70–62	12–10 (3–6)	18 – Briggs	13 – Briggs	6 – Briggs	Memorial Coliseum (5,087); Lexington, KY
February 9, 2020; 1:00 pm, SECN		Georgia	L 43–49	12–11 (3–7)	13 – Williams	11 – Williams	2 – Tied	O'Connell Center (2,439); Gainesville, FL
February 13, 2020; 6:00 pm, SECN+		Ole Miss	W 74–72	13–11 (4–7)	23 – Briggs	9 – Williams	4 – Tied	O'Connell Center (1,008); Gainesville, FL
February 16, 2020; 3:00 pm, SECN+		at Missouri	W 75–67	14–11 (5–7)	18 – Tied	12 – Williams	3 – Tied	Mizzou Arena (4,635); Columbia, MO
February 20, 2020; 8:00 pm, SECN+		at Alabama	L 62–69	14–12 (5–8)	21 – Briggs	6 – Dut	5 – Smith	Coleman Coliseum (1,888); Tuscaloosa, AL
February 23, 2020; 4:00 pm, SECN		No. 22 Arkansas	W 83–80	15–12 (6–8)	26 – Smith	10 – Williams	4 – Smith	O'Connell Center (1,749); Gainesville, FL
February 27, 2020; 8:00 pm, SECN+		No. 1 South Carolina	L 67–100	15–13 (6–9)	16 – Williams	4 – Tied	4 – Smith	O'Connell Center (1,512); Gainesville, FL
March 1, 2020; 1:00 pm, SECN+		at Georgia	L 59–65	15–14 (6–10)	13 – Briggs	10 – Briggs	2 – Tied	Stegeman Coliseum (3,539); Athens, GA
SEC Tournament
March 5, 2020; 6:00 pm, SECN	(10)	vs. (7) LSU; Second round	L 59–73	15–15	22 – Briggs	5 – Briggs	4 – Tied	Bon Secours Wellness Arena; Greenville, SC
*Non-conference game. ^{#}Rankings from AP Poll. (#) Tournament seedings in parentheses. All times are in Eastern Time.
