= 2019–20 Auburn Tigers women's basketball team =

Intercollegiate basketball season

2019–20 Auburn Tigers women's basketball
- Conference: Southeastern Conference
- Record: 11–18 (4–12 SEC)
- Head coach: Terri Williams-Flournoy (8th season)
- Assistant coaches: Ty Evans; Clarisse Garcia; La'Keshia Frett Meredith
- Home arena: Auburn Arena

2019–20 SEC women's basketball standings
	Conf.				Overall
Team	W		L	PCT	W		L	PCT
No. 1 South Carolina †	16	–	0	1.000	32	–	1	.970
No. 9 Mississippi State	13	–	3	.813	27	–	6	.818
No. 24 Arkansas	10	–	6	.625	24	–	8	.750
No. 16 Kentucky	10	–	6	.625	22	–	8	.733
No. 19 Texas A&M	10	–	6	.625	22	–	8	.733
Tennessee	10	–	6	.625	21	–	10	.677
LSU	9	–	7	.563	20	–	10	.667
Alabama	8	–	8	.500	18	–	12	.600
Georgia	7	–	9	.438	17	–	14	.548
Florida	6	–	10	.375	15	–	15	.500
Missouri	5	–	11	.313	9	–	22	.290
Vanderbilt	4	–	12	.250	14	–	16	.467
Auburn	4	–	12	.250	11	–	18	.379
Ole Miss	0	–	16	.000	7	–	23	.233
† 2020 SEC tournament winner Rankings from AP poll

The 2019–20 Auburn Tigers women's basketball team represented Auburn University during the 2019–20 NCAA Division I women's basketball season. The Tigers, led by eighth-year head coach Terri Williams-Flournoy, played their home games at Auburn Arena and competed as members of the Southeastern Conference (SEC).

== Preseason ==
=== SEC media poll ===
The SEC media poll was released on October 15, 2019.

Media poll
Predicted finish	Team
1	South Carolina
2	Texas A&M
3	Mississippi State
4	Kentucky
5	Arkansas
6	Tennessee
7	Auburn
8	LSU
9	Missouri
10	Georgia
11	Alabama
12	Florida
13	Ole Miss
14	Vanderbilt

== Schedule ==
Date time, TV	Rank^{#}	Opponent^{#}	Result	Record	High points	High rebounds	High assists	Site (attendance) city, state
Non-conference regular season
November 6, 2019*; 6:00 pm, SECN+		Wofford	W 84–82	1–0	25 – Thompson	11 – Thompson	4 – Hughes	Auburn Arena (1,618); Auburn, AL
November 14, 2019*; 6:00 pm, SECN+		Old Dominion	L 77–89	1–1	17 – Alexander	10 – Thompson	2 – Tied	Auburn Arena; Auburn, AL
November 21, 2019*; 6:00 pm		at UAB	L 75–80	1–2	24 – Thompson	19 – Thompson	3 – Tied	Bartow Arena (1,081); Birmingham, AL
November 24, 2019*; 7:00 pm, SECN+		Saint Joseph's	W 66–62	2–2	18 – Hansen	12 – Thompson	5 – Thompson	Auburn Arena (1,796); Auburn, AL
November 29, 2019*; 10:00 am		vs. Middle Tennessee; Gulf Coast Showcase	L 50–73	2–3	15 – Thompson	10 – Thompson	3 – Wells	Hertz Arena (313); Estero, FL
November 30, 2019*; 10:00 am		vs. Dayton; Gulf Coast Showcase	W 76–74 ^{OT}	3–3	19 – Tied	10 – Chandler	6 – Fowler	Hertz Arena; Estero, FL
December 1, 2019*; 12:30 pm		vs. Drake; Gulf Coast Showcase	L 82–83	3–4	24 – Tied	11 – Thompson	4 – Tied	Hertz Arena (457); Estero, FL
December 4, 2019*; 7:00 pm, ESPN+		at South Alabama	W 82–62	4–4	20 – Moore	10 – Thompson	4 – Hansen	Mitchell Center (1,106); Mobile, AL
December 7, 2019*; 2:00 pm		at TCU; Big 12/SEC Women's Challenge	L 65–80	4–5	31 – Thompson	15 – Thompson	4 – Tied	Schollmaier Arena (2,259); Fort Worth, TX
December 15, 2019*; 2:00 pm, SECN+		Bethune–Cookman	W 74–56	5–5	16 – Thompson	13 – Thompson	3 – Tied	Auburn Arena; Auburn, AL
December 28, 2019*; 2:00 pm, SECN+		Jacksonville State	W 62–53	6–5	20 – Thompson	10 – Thompson	2 – Tied	Auburn Arena (1,827); Auburn, AL
SEC regular season
January 2, 2020; 7:30 pm, SECN		at Vanderbilt	L 55–77	6–6 (0–1)	17 – Moore	10 – Thompson	4 – Alexander	Memorial Gymnasium (2,255); Nashville, TN
January 5, 2020; 1:00 pm, SECN		No. 20 Arkansas	L 70–86	6–7 (0–2)	19 – Tied	13 – Thompson	6 – Thompson	Auburn Arena (1,702); Auburn, AL
January 9, 2020; 6:00 pm, SECN+		Florida	L 63–83	6–8 (0–3)	14 – Moore	10 – Thompson	3 – Tied	Auburn Arena (1,621); Auburn, AL
January 12, 2020; 2:00 pm, SECN+		Alabama	L 48–75	6–9 (0–4)	16 – Thompson	14 – Thompson	4 – Hansen	Auburn Arena (2,833); Auburn, AL
January 19, 2020; 1:00 pm, ESPNU		at Georgia	L 50–61	6–10 (0–5)	17 – Alexander	11 – Thompson	2 – Thompson	Stegeman Coliseum (4,888); Athens, GA
January 23, 2020; 6:00 pm, SECN+		Ole Miss	W 59–43	7–10 (1–5)	17 – Benton	13 – Thompson	3 – Tied	Auburn Arena (1,483); Auburn, AL
January 27, 2020; 6:00 pm, SECN		at No. 13 Kentucky	L 61–68	7–11 (1–6)	27 – Thompson	15 – Thompson	7 – Alexander	Memorial Coliseum (3,803); Lexington, KY
January 30, 2020; 7:00 pm, SECN+		at No. 9 Mississippi State	L 73–78	7–12 (1–7)	21 – Thompson	11 – Thompson	2 – Tied	Humphrey Coliseum (7,249); Starkville, MS
February 2, 2020; 2:00 pm, SECN+		Vanderbilt	W 70–62	8–12 (2–7)	18 – Tied	12 – Thompson	4 – Alexander	Auburn Arena (1,728); Auburn, AL
February 9, 2020; 2:00 pm, SECN		at Alabama	L 64–68	8–13 (2–8)	15 – Howard	12 – Thompson	6 – Alexander	Coleman Coliseum (3,188); Tuscaloosa, AL
February 13, 2020; 2:00 pm, SECN		at No. 1 South Carolina	L 53–79	8–14 (2–9)	15 – Benton	8 – Thompson	3 – Tied	Colonial Life Arena (11,417); Columbia, SC
February 16, 2020; 4:00 pm, SECN		LSU	W 65–60	9–14 (3–9)	23 – Thompson	6 – Tied	10 – Alexander	Auburn Arena (2,057); Auburn, AL
February 20, 2020; 8:00 pm, SECN		No. 9 Mississippi State	L 85–92 ^{OT}	9–15 (3–10)	24 – Thompson	11 – Thompson	6 – Alexander	Auburn Arena (1,656); Auburn, AL
February 23, 2020; 3:00 pm, ESPN2		at No. 16 Texas A&M	L 54–84	9–16 (3–11)	15 – Alexander	8 – Thompson	4 – Alexander	Reed Arena (4,809); College Station, TX
February 27, 2020; 7:00 pm, SECN+		at Missouri	W 95–82	10–16 (4–11)	23 – Benton	14 – Thompson	6 – Alexander	Mizzou Arena; Columbia, MO
March 1, 2020; 2:00 pm, SECN		Tennessee	L 55–56	10–17 (4–12)	14 – Alexander	5 – Tied	2 – Wells	Auburn Arena; Auburn, AL
SEC Tournament
March 4, 2020; 10:00 am, SECN	(13)	vs. (12) Vanderbilt; First round	W 77–67	11–17	21 – Thompson	9 – Thompson	9 – Alexander	Bon Secours Wellness Arena; Greenville, SC
March 5, 2020; 1:30 pm, SECN	(13)	vs. (5) No. 25 Arkansas; Second round	L 68–90	11–18	15 – White	15 – Thompson	4 – White	Bon Secours Wellness Arena; Greenville, SC
*Non-conference game. ^{#}Rankings from AP Poll. (#) Tournament seedings in parentheses. All times are in Central Time.
