= 2019–20 Texas A&M Aggies women's basketball team =

Intercollegiate basketball season

2019–20 Texas A&M Aggies women's basketball
- Conference: Southeastern Conference

Ranking
- Coaches: No. 18
- AP: No. 19
- Record: 22–8 (10–6 SEC)
- Head coach: Gary Blair (17th season)
- Assistant coaches: Kelly Bond-White; Bob Starkey; Amy Wright
- Home arena: Reed Arena

2019–20 SEC women's basketball standings
	Conf.				Overall
Team	W		L	PCT	W		L	PCT
No. 1 South Carolina †	16	–	0	1.000	32	–	1	.970
No. 9 Mississippi State	13	–	3	.813	27	–	6	.818
No. 24 Arkansas	10	–	6	.625	24	–	8	.750
No. 16 Kentucky	10	–	6	.625	22	–	8	.733
No. 19 Texas A&M	10	–	6	.625	22	–	8	.733
Tennessee	10	–	6	.625	21	–	10	.677
LSU	9	–	7	.563	20	–	10	.667
Alabama	8	–	8	.500	18	–	12	.600
Georgia	7	–	9	.438	17	–	14	.548
Florida	6	–	10	.375	15	–	15	.500
Missouri	5	–	11	.313	9	–	22	.290
Vanderbilt	4	–	12	.250	14	–	16	.467
Auburn	4	–	12	.250	11	–	18	.379
Ole Miss	0	–	16	.000	7	–	23	.233
† 2020 SEC tournament winner Rankings from AP poll

The 2019–20 Texas A&M Aggies women's basketball team represented Texas A&M University in the 2019–20 NCAA Division I women's basketball season. The team's head coach was Gary Blair, who entered his seventeenth season at Texas A&M. The team played their home games at the Reed Arena in College Station, Texas and in its eighth season as a member of the Southeastern Conference.

== Previous season ==
The Aggies finished the 2018–19 season with a record of 26-8 (12-4 SEC). They lost the SEC women's tournament to Arkansas. They received an at-large bid to the NCAA women's tournament and defeated Wright State and Marquette in the first and second rounds, before losing to Notre Dame in the Sweet Sixteen for the second-straight year.

== Roster ==
2019–20 Texas A&M Aggies women's basketball team
Players
Coaches

Pos.	#	Name	Height	Year	Previous school	Hometown
G	1	Aahliyah Jackson	5 ft 10 in (1.78 m)	Jr	Northside	Fort Smith, AR
G	2	Aaliyah Wilson	5 ft 11 in (1.8 m)	RS Jr	Muskogee	Muskogee, OK
G	3	Chennedy Carter	5 ft 7 in (1.7 m)	Jr	Mansfield Timberview	Mansfield, TX
G	4	Shambria Washington	5 ft 7 in (1.7 m)	Sr	Trinity Catholic	Ocala, FL
G	5	Jordan Nixon	5 ft 3 in (1.6 m)	RS So	The Mary Louis Academy; Notre Dame	New York City, NY
G	11	Kayla Wells	6 ft 0 in (1.83 m)	Jr	South Grand Prairie	Dallas, TX
F	12	Cheah Rael-Whitsitt	5 ft 11 in (1.8 m)	Sr	Huron	Ann Arbor, MI
G	15	Jasmine Williams	5 ft 10 in (1.78 m)	Jr	Cy-Woods	Houston, TX
G	23	Mckinzie Green	5 ft 6 in (1.68 m)	Fr	Manvel	Manvel, TX
F	31	N'dea Jones	6 ft 2 in (1.88 m)	Jr	Brookwood	Lawrenceville, GA
C	33	Anna Dreimane	6 ft 5 in (1.96 m)	Jr	Riga State Gymnasium No. 2	Riga, Latvia
C	40	Ciera Johnson	6 ft 4 in (1.93 m)	RS Jr	Duncanville	Duncanville, TX

Head coach

- Gary Blair (Texas Tech)

Assistant coach(es)

- Kelly Bond-White (Illinois)
- Bob Starkey (LSU)
- Amy Wright (Arkansas)

Legend

- (C) Team captain
- (S) Suspended
- (I) Ineligible
- (W) Walk-on
- Injured
- Current redshirt

Roster
Last update: November 7, 2019

== Rankings ==
Ranking movements Legend: ██ Increase in ranking ██ Decrease in ranking
	Week																				
Poll	Pre	1	2	3	4	5	6	7	8	9	10	11	12	13	14	15	16	17	18	19	Final
AP	6	6	5	6	6	12	11	11	11												
Coaches	7	7	7	7	7	13	13														

^Coaches' Poll did not release a second poll at the same time as the AP.

== Schedule ==
Date time, TV	Rank^{#}	Opponent^{#}	Result	Record	Site (attendance) city, state
Exhibition
11/1/2019; 6:00 p.m.	No. 6	Oklahoma City	W 67–37	–	Reed Arena; College Station, TX
11/07/2019; 7:00 p.m.	No. 6	USA	L 63–93	–	Reed Arena (3,785); College Station, TX
Non-conference season
11/5/2019; 7:00 p.m., SECN+	No. 6	Little Rock	W 78–35	1–0	Reed Arena (2,758); College Station, TX
11/10/2019; 6:30 p.m., SECN+	No. 6	Duke	W 79–58	2–0	Reed Arena (3,289); College Station, TX
11/17/2019; 2:00 p.m., ESPN+	No. 5	at Rice	W 62–61	3–0	Tudor Fieldhouse (1,808); Houston, TX
11/23/2019; 7:30 p.m., P12N+	No. 6	at USC	W 74–64	4–0	Galen Center (682); Los Angeles, CA
11/27/2019; 6:00 p.m., SECN+	No. 6	Prairie View A&M	W 80–38	5–0	Reed Arena (3,176); College Station, Texas
12/1/2019; 6:30 p.m., FOXSW	No. 6	vs. No. 12 Florida State; Maggie Dixon Classic	L 58–80	5–1	Schollmaier Arena (2,207); Fort Worth, TX
12/4/2019; 11:00 a.m., SECN+	No. 12	Central Arkansas	W 76–46	6–1	Reed Arena (6,450); College Station, TX
12/7/2019; 7:00 p.m., SECN+	No. 12	Oklahoma State; Big 12/SEC Women's Challenge	W 74–62	7–1	Reed Arena; College Station, TX
12/11/2019; 7:00 p.m., SECN+	No. 11	TCU	W 70–68	8–1	Reed Arena (3,015); College Station, TX
12/15/2019; 7:00 p.m., SECN	No. 11	Houston	W 72–43	9–1	Reed Arena (3,608); College Station, TX
12/20/2019; 3:00 p.m.	No. 11	vs. Georgia Tech; Puerto Rico Coqui Classic	W 60–48	10–1	Mario Morales Coliseum (100); Guaynabo, PR
12/21/2019; 12:30 p.m.	No. 11	vs. Montana State; Puerto Rico Coqui Classic	W 78–67	11–1	Mario Morales Coliseum (100); Guaynabo, PR
12/29/2019; 3:00 p.m., SECN+	No. 11	Texas A&M–Corpus Christi	W 85–48	12–1	Reed Arena (3,804); College Station, TX
SEC regular season
1/2/2020; 8:00 p.m., SECN+	No. 11	at No. 20 Arkansas	W 84–77	13–1 (1–0)	Bud Walton Arena (4,243); Fayetteville, AR
1/6/2020; 6:00 p.m., SECN	No. 10	Ole Miss	W 79–35	14–1 (2–0)	Reed Arena (4,006); College Station, TX
1/9/2020; 8:00 p.m., SECN	No. 10	LSU	L 54–57	14–2 (2–1)	Reed Arena (4,007); College Station, TX
1/16/2020; 5:30 p.m., SECN	No. 12	at No. 11 Kentucky	L 54–76	14–3 (2–2)	Memorial Coliseum (3,886); Lexington, KY
1/19/2020; 3:00 p.m., SECN	No. 12	Florida	W 69–42	15–3 (3–2)	Reed Arena (4,081); College Station, TX
1/23/2020; 7:00 p.m., SECN+	No. 15	at Alabama	W 79–74	16–3 (4–2)	Coleman Coliseum (1,856); Tuscaloosa, AL
1/26/2020; 3:00 p.m., SECN+	No. 15	Missouri	W 72–53	17–3 (5–2)	Reed Arena (3,883); College Station, TX
1/30/2020; 7:00 p.m., SECN+	No. 15	Georgia	W 64–63	18–3 (6–2)	Reed Arena (3,044); College Station, TX
2/2/2020; 7:00 p.m., SECN	No. 15	at LSU	L 58–59	18–4 (6–3)	Maravich Center (2,494); Baton Rouge, LA
2/9/2020; 12:00 p.m., ESPN	No. 16	at No. 8 Mississippi State	L 57–69	18–5 (6–4)	Humphrey Coliseum (8,400); Starkville, MS
2/13/2020; 8:00 p.m., SECN	No. 16	Vanderbilt	W 74–53	19–5 (7–4)	Reed Arena (3,193); College Station, TX
2/16/2020; 2:00 p.m., ESPN2	No. 16	at No. 25 Tennessee	W 73–71	20–5 (8–4)	Thompson–Boling Arena (12,738); Knoxville, TN
2/20/2020; 6:00 p.m., SECN+	No. 16	at Georgia	W 64–47	21–5 (9–4)	Stegeman Coliseum (2,720); Athens, GA
2/23/2020; 3:00 p.m., ESPN2	No. 16	Auburn	W 84–54	22–5 (10–4)	Reed Arena (4,809); College Station, TX
2/27/2020; 6:00 p.m., SECN	No. 12	Alabama	L 63–76	22–6 (10–5)	Reed Arena (4,061); College Station, TX
3/1/2020; 11:00 a.m., ESPN2	No. 12	at No. 1 South Carolina	L 52–60	22–7 (10–6)	Colonial Life Arena (18,000); Columbia, SC
SEC Tournament
March 6, 2020; 2:30 pm, SECN	(4) No. 15	vs. (5) No. 25 Arkansas; Quarterfinals	L 66–67	22–8	Bon Secours Wellness Arena; Greenville, SC
*Non-conference game. ^{#}Rankings from AP Poll. (#) Tournament seedings in parentheses. All times are in Central Time.
