= Robin Pingeton =

American basketball coach (born 1968)

Current position
- Title: Head coach
- Team: Wisconsin
- Conference: Big Ten
- Record: 16–18 (.471)

Biographical details
- Born: July 9, 1968 (age 58); Atkins, Iowa, U.S.

Playing career
- 1986–1990: St. Ambrose

Coaching career (HC unless noted)
- 1990–1992: Drake (GA)
- 1992–2000: St. Ambrose
- 2000–2002: Iowa State (assistant)
- 2002–2003: Iowa State (associate HC)
- 2003–2010: Illinois State
- 2010–2025: Missouri
- 2025–present: Wisconsin

Head coaching record
- Overall: 601–393 (.605)
- Tournaments: 3–6 (NCAA Tournament); 11–9 (WNIT); 3–1 (WBIT)

Robin Renee Pingeton (née Becker; born July 9, 1968) is American basketball coach for Wisconsin Badgers women's basketball. She has previously served as head coach of St. Ambrose, Illinois State, and Missouri.

== Playing career ==
=== College ===
Pingeton graduated from Saint Ambrose University in 1990. She remains the school's all-time leading scorer with 2,502 points. She also earned All-America honors in both softball and basketball.

=== WBA ===
Pingeton played three seasons of professional basketball in the Women's Basketball Association.

== Coaching career ==
Before joining Missouri, Pingeton was the head women's basketball coach at Illinois State University. She also served as head coach at her alma mater, Saint Ambrose University.

On March 25, 2025, she was named head coach of the Wisconsin Badgers.

== Personal life ==
Pingeton and her husband, Rich, have two children: a son born in 2006 and another son born in 2011.

== Head coaching record ==
Record table
Season	Team	Overall	Conference	Standing	Postseason
St. Ambrose Fighting Bees (Midwest Collegiate Conference) (1992–2000)
1992–93	St. Ambrose	22–8			
1993–94	St. Ambrose	25–7			NAIA Division II First Round
1994–95	St. Ambrose	19–11			
1995–96	St. Ambrose	29–6			NAIA Division II Elite Eight
1996–97	St. Ambrose	27–7			NAIA Division II First Round
1997–98	St. Ambrose	20–15			
1998–99	St. Ambrose	19–15			NAIA Division II First Round
1999–00	St. Ambrose	30–7			NAIA Division II Elite Eight
St. Ambrose:		191–76 (.715)			
Illinois State Redbirds (Missouri Valley Conference) (2003–2010)
2003–04	Illinois State	16–13	9–9	T–5th	
2004–05	Illinois State	13–18	7–11	8th	NCAA Division I first round
2005–06	Illinois State	12–16	7–11	T–6th	
2006–07	Illinois State	22–11	13–5	2nd	WNIT second round
2007–08	Illinois State	26–7	13–5	T–1st	NCAA Division I first round
2008–09	Illinois State	27–8	15–3	1st	WNIT semifinals
2009–10	Illinois State	28–8	16–2	1st	WNIT semifinals
Illinois State:		144–81 (.640)	80–46 (.635)		
Missouri Tigers (Big 12 Conference) (2010–2012)
2010–11	Missouri	13–18	5–11	10th	
2011–12	Missouri	13–18	2–16	10th	
Missouri (Big 12):		26–36 (.419)	7–29 (.194)		
Missouri Tigers (Southeastern Conference) (2012–2025)
2012–13	Missouri	17–15	6–10	T-8th	WNIT first round
2013–14	Missouri	17–14	6–10	T-11th	WNIT first round
2014–15	Missouri	19–14	7–9	T-7th	WNIT third round
2015–16	Missouri	22–10	8–8	T-7th	NCAA Division I second round
2016–17	Missouri	22–11	11–5	T-3rd	NCAA Division I second round
2017–18	Missouri	24–8	11–5	T-4th	NCAA Division I first round
2018–19	Missouri	24–11	10–6	5th	NCAA Division I second round
2019–20	Missouri	9–22	5–11	11th	
2020–21	Missouri	9–13	5–9	10th	WNIT first round
2021–22	Missouri	18–13	7–9	T–8th	WNIT first round
2022–23	Missouri	18–14	6–10	9th	WNIT second round
2023–24	Missouri	11–19	2–14	14th	
2024–25	Missouri	14–18	3–13	T–13th	
Missouri (SEC):		224–182 (.552)	87–119 (.422)		
Missouri (total):		250–218 (.534)			
Wisconsin Badgers (Big Ten Conference) (2025–present)
2025–26	Wisconsin	16–18	5–13	T–14th	WBIT Semifinals
Wisconsin:		16–18 (.471)	5–13 (.278)		
Total:		601–393 (.605)			
National champion Postseason invitational champion Conference regular season champion Conference regular season and conference tournament champion Division regular season champion Division regular season and conference tournament champion Conference tournament champion

== See also ==
- List of college women's basketball career coaching wins leaders
