= 2025–26 Ole Miss Rebels women's basketball team =

Intercollegiate basketball season

2025–26 Ole Miss Rebels women's basketball

NCAA tournament, Second round
- Conference: Southeastern Conference

Ranking
- Coaches: No. 20
- AP: No. 19
- Record: 24–12 (8–8 SEC)
- Head coach: Yolett McPhee-McCuin (8th season)
- Assistant coaches: Empress Davenport (2nd season); Kayla Gordon (2nd season); Quentin Hillsman (2nd season); Joy Smith (2nd season); Jacob Whitehead (2nd season)
- Home arena: SJB Pavilion

2025–26 SEC women's basketball standings
	Conf.				Overall
Team	W		L	PCT	W		L	PCT
No. 2 South Carolina	15	–	1	.938	36	–	4	.900
No. 10 Vanderbilt	13	–	3	.813	29	–	5	.853
No. 4 Texas †	13	–	3	.813	35	–	4	.897
No. 8 LSU	12	–	4	.750	29	–	6	.829
No. 12 Oklahoma	11	–	5	.688	26	–	8	.765
Tennessee	8	–	8	.500	16	–	14	.533
No. 21 Ole Miss	8	–	8	.500	24	–	12	.667
Georgia	8	–	8	.500	22	–	10	.688
No. 14 Kentucky	8	–	8	.500	25	–	11	.694
Texas A&M	7	–	9	.438	14	–	13	.519
No. 24 Alabama	7	–	9	.438	24	–	11	.686
Florida	5	–	11	.313	18	–	15	.545
Mississippi State	5	–	11	.313	18	–	13	.581
Missouri	4	–	12	.250	17	–	17	.500
Auburn	3	–	13	.188	15	–	17	.469
Arkansas	1	–	15	.063	12	–	20	.375
† 2026 SEC tournament winner Rankings from AP poll

The 2025–26 Ole Miss Rebels women's basketball team represented the University of Mississippi during the 2025–26 NCAA Division I women's basketball season. The Rebels, led by eighth-year head coach Yolett McPhee-McCuin, will play their home games at The Sandy and John Black Pavilion at Ole Miss and compete as members of the Southeastern Conference (SEC).

== Previous season ==
The Rebels finished the season 22–11 (10–6 SEC) to finish tied for sixth place in the conference. They received an at-large bid to the NCAA tournament, where they defeated Ball State and Baylor before falling to UCLA in the Sweet Sixteen.

== Offseason ==
=== Departures ===
Ole Miss departures
Name	Number	Pos.	Height	Year	Hometown	Notes	Ref
KK Deans	1	G	5'8"	Graduate	Greensboro, North Carolina	Graduated	
Tameiya Sadler	2	G	5'8"	Graduate	Vallejo, California	Graduated	
Kennedy Todd-Williams	3	G	6'0"	Senior	Jacksonville, North Carolina	Graduated	
Starr Jacobs	7	F	6'1"	Graduate	Dallas, Texas	Graduated	
Jite Gbemuotor	9	F	6'2"	Freshman	Delta State, Nigeria	Transferred to Cal State Northridge	
Fatumata Djaló	11	G	5'10"	Freshman	Aveiro, Portugal	Transferred to Monmouth	
Mariyah Noel	13	G	5'11"	Sophomore	Kansas City, Kansas	Transferred to Xavier	
Heloisa Carrera	14	F	6'2"	Freshman	São Paulo, Brazil	Transferred to Arizona State	
Ayanna Thompson	20	G	6'1"	Junior	DeSoto, Texas	Transferred to SMU	
Madison Scott	24	F	6'2"	Graduate	Indian Head, Maryland	Drafted fourteenth overall by the Dallas Wings	
Kharyssa Richardson	33	F	6'2"	Junior	Douglasville, Georgia	Transferred to Mississippi State	
Rhema Collins	35	F	6'2"	Sophomore	Nassau, Bahamas	Transferred to FIU	

=== 2025 recruiting class ===
College recruiting
Name	Hometown	School	Height	Weight	Commit date
Lauren Jacobs; G	Columbia, South Carolina	Heathwood Hall Episcopal School	5 ft 9 in (1.75 m)	N/A	
Lauren Jacobs; G	Recruit ratings: ESPN: (91)				
Overall recruit ranking:
Note: In many cases, Scout, Rivals, 247Sports, On3, and ESPN may conflict in their listings of height and weight.; In these cases, the average was taken. ESPN grades are on a 100-point scale.; Sources:

=== Incoming transfers ===
Ole Miss incoming transfers
Name	Number	Pos.	Height	Year	Hometown	Previous school
Denim DeShields	1	G	5'5"	Senior	Atlanta, Georgia	Mississippi State
Kaitlin Peterson	3	G	5'9"	Graduate	Eufaula, Alabama	UCF
Jayla Murray	4	F	6'1"	Graduate	St. Louis, Missouri	Wichita State
Desrae Kyles	7	C	6'5"	Sophomore	Benton Harbor, Michigan	Central Michigan
Latasha Lattimore	8	F	6'4"	Graduate	Toronto, Ontario	Virginia
Debreasha Powe	21	G/F	6'1"	Senior	Meridian, Mississippi	Mississippi State
Cotie McMahon	32	F	6'0"	Senior	Dayton, Ohio	Ohio State
Tianna Thompson	35	G	5'10"	Sophomore	Atlanta, Georgia	Georgia Tech

== Roster ==
2025–26 Ole Miss Rebels women's basketball team
Players
Coaches

Pos.	#	Name	Height	Year	Previous school	Hometown
F	0	Sira Thienou	6 ft 1 in (1.85 m)	So	Shining Stars Sports Academy	Bamako, Mali
G	1	Denim DeShields	5 ft 5 in (1.65 m)	Sr	Mississippi State	Atlanta, GA
G	2	Lauren Jacobs	5 ft 9 in (1.75 m)	Fr	Heathwood Hall Episcopal	Columbia, SC
G	3	Kaitlin Peterson	5 ft 9 in (1.75 m)	GS	UCF	Eufaula, AL
F	4	Jayla Murray	6 ft 1 in (1.85 m)	GS	Wichita State	St. Louis, MO
C	7	Desrae Kyles	6 ft 5 in (1.96 m)	So	Central Michigan	Benton Harbor, MI
F	8	Latasha Lattimore	6 ft 4 in (1.93 m)	GS	Virginia	Toronto, ON
C	10	J'Adore Young	6 ft 4 in (1.93 m)	So	Greenville HS	Mauldin, SC
F	12	Christeen Iwuala	6 ft 3 in (1.91 m)	Sr	UCLA	San Antonio, TX
G/F	21	Debreasha Powe	6 ft 1 in (1.85 m)	Sr	Mississippi State	Meridian, MS
F	32	Cotie McMahon	6 ft 0 in (1.83 m)	Sr	Ohio State	Dayton, OH
G	35	Tianna Thompson	5 ft 10 in (1.78 m)	So	Georgia Tech	Atlanta, GA

Head coach

- Yolett McPhee-McCuin (Rhode Island)

Assistant coach(es)

- Empress Davenport (Texas)
- Kayla Gordon (Jacksonville)
- Quentin Hillsman (St. Mary's (MD))
- Joy Smith (Duke)
- Jacob Whitehead (SIU Edwardsville)

Legend

- (C) Team captain
- (S) Suspended
- (I) Ineligible
- (W) Walk-on
- Injured
- Current redshirt

Roster
Last update: June 12, 2025

== Schedule and results ==
Date time, TV	Rank^{#}	Opponent^{#}	Result	Record	High points	High rebounds	High assists	Site (attendance) city, state
Exhibition
October 26, 2025*; 2:00 p.m.	No. 12	Southern Arkansas	W 96–36		–	–	–	SJB Pavilion; Oxford, MS
Non-conference regular season
November 3, 2025*; 11:00 a.m., SECN	No. 12	Norfolk State	W 87–46	1–0	15 – Iwuala	9 – Thienou	6 – Peterson	SJB Pavilion (8,030); Oxford, MS
November 7, 2025*; 7:00 p.m., SWACTV	No. 12	at Alabama A&M	W 84–45	2–0	20 – McMahon	7 – Iwuala	5 – Peterson	Alabama A&M Events Center (327); Huntsville, AL
November 12, 2025*; 6:00 p.m., SECN+/ESPN+	No. 13	Southern	W 94–44	3–0	22 – Iwuala	11 – Iwuala	6 – DeShields	SJB Pavilion (2,299); Oxford, MS
November 18, 2025*; 7:00 p.m., ESPN+	No. 13	at Memphis	W 73–64 ^{OT}	4–0	19 – Tied	14 – Iwuala	4 – DeShields	Elma Roane Fieldhouse (1,217); Memphis, TN
November 24, 2025*; 6:00 p.m., SECN+/ESPN+	No. 13	Longwood	W 102–50	5–0	29 – McMahon	9 – McMahon	6 – Thienou	SJB Pavilion (2,574); Oxford, MS
November 28, 2025*; 3:00 p.m., Baller TV	No. 13	vs. Wisconsin; Daytona Beach Classic	W 65–56	6–0	20 – Iwuala	8 – Iwuala	4 – McMahon	Ocean Center (225); Daytona Beach, FL
November 29, 2025*; 3:00 p.m., Baller TV	No. 13	vs. George Mason; Daytona Beach Classic	W 81–67	7–0	21 – Iwuala	10 – Iwuala	5 – Thienou	Ocean Center (217); Daytona Beach, FL
December 4, 2025*; 8:00 p.m., ESPN2	No. 13	No. 18 Notre Dame; ACC–SEC Challenge	W 69–62	8–0	22 – McMahon	13 – Iwuala	8 – Thienou	SJB Pavilion (3,468); Oxford, MS
December 7, 2025*; 2:00 p.m., ESPN+	No. 13	vs. Kansas State; Bill Snyder Classic	L 60–61	8–1	22 – McMahon	8 – Tied	4 – Thienou	St. Joseph Civic Arena (1,681); St. Joseph, MO
December 13, 2025*; 12:00 p.m., SECN+/ESPN+	No. 17	Wofford	W 86–52	9–1	24 – McMahon	12 – Thienou	5 – McMahon	SJB Pavilion (2,725); Oxford, MS
December 14, 2025*; 2:00 p.m., SECN+/ESPN+	No. 17	South Carolina State	W 91–32	10–1	18 – Lattimore	9 – Iwuala	4 – Tied	SJB Pavilion (2,655); Oxford, MS
December 17, 2025*; 6:00 p.m., SECN+/ESPN+	No. 14	Mississippi Valley State	W 102–34	11–1	24 – McMahon	11 – Iwuala	3 – Tied	SJB Pavilion (2,442); Oxford, MS
December 21, 2025*; 6:00 p.m.	No. 14	vs. Old Dominion; Cherokee Invitational Semifinal	W 86–57	12–1	23 – Iwuala	10 – Iwuala	5 – Thienou	Harrah's Cherokee (1,267); Cherokee, NC
December 22, 2025*; 6:30 p.m.	No. 15	vs. No. 24 Michigan State; Cherokee Invitational championship game	L 49–66	12–2	13 – McMahon	10 – Thienou	2 – DeShields	Harrah's Cherokee (350); Cherokee, NC
December 28, 2025*; 2:00 p.m., SECN+/ESPN+	No. 15	Alcorn State	W 64–44	13–2	21 – McMahon	12 – Lattimore	3 – Tied	SJB Pavilion (2,409); Oxford, MS
SEC regular season
January 1, 2026; 2:00 p.m., SECN+/ESPN+	No. 15	Georgia	W 79–62	14–2 (1–0)	24 – McMahon	8 – McMahon	5 – McMahon	SJB Pavilion (2,595); Oxford, MS
January 4, 2026; 2:00 p.m., ESPN2	No. 15	at No. 2 Texas	L 64–67	14–3 (1–1)	19 – McMahon	6 – Tied	4 – McMahon	Moody Center (10,113); Austin, TX
January 8, 2026; 6:00 p.m., SECN+/ESPN+	No. 18	at No. 5 Oklahoma	W 74–69	15–3 (2–1)	22 – McMahon	9 – Lattimore	4 – McMahon	Lloyd Noble Center (4,327); Norman, OK
January 11, 2026; 5:00 p.m., SECN	No. 18	Mississippi State; We Back Pat	W 93–68	16–3 (3–1)	21 – McMahon	6 – Iwuala	5 – Tied	SJB Pavilion (4,634); Oxford, MS
January 18, 2026; 11:00 a.m., SECN	No. 16	at Georgia	L 59–82	16–4 (3–2)	13 – Iwuala	11 – McMahon	5 – McMahon	Stegeman Coliseum (3,359); Athens, GA
January 22, 2026; 6:30 p.m., SECN+/ESPN+	No. 18	at Missouri	W 82–61	17–4 (4–2)	33 – McMahon	12 – McMahon	5 – McMahon	Mizzou Arena (2,862); Columbia, MO
January 30, 2026; 2:00 p.m., SECN+/ESPN+	No. 17	vs. No. 5 Vanderbilt	W 83–75	18–4 (5–2)	27 – McMahon	14 – Iwuala	3 – McMahon	Legacy Arena (Note: Two Ole Miss home games against Vanderbilt and Auburn were moved to Birmingham, Alabama, because of ongoing winter storm impacts in Oxford, Mississippi.) (2,158); Birmingham, AL
February 2, 2026; 6:00 p.m., SECN+/ESPN+	No. 13	vs. Auburn	W 71–45	19–4 (6–2)	20 – McMahon	11 – Iwuala	3 – Peterson	Legacy Arena (3,787); Birmingham, AL
February 5, 2026; 8:00 p.m., SECN	No. 13	at No. 21 Alabama; Play4Kay	L 63–64	19–5 (6–3)	24 – McMahon	15 – Iwuala	5 – McMahon	Coleman Coliseum (2,625); Tuscaloosa, AL
February 12, 2026; 8:00 p.m., SECN	No. 14	Arkansas	W 80–57	20–5 (7–3)	21 – McMahon	11 – Lattimore	5 – McMahon	SJB Pavilion (2,484); Oxford, MS
February 15, 2026; 1:00 p.m., SECN	No. 14	at No. 18 Kentucky	L 57–74	20–6 (7–4)	18 – McMahon	11 – Lattimore	2 – Tied	Memorial Coliseum (5,285); Lexington, KY
February 17, 2026; 6:00 p.m., ESPNU	No. 17	No. 21 Tennessee	W 94–81	21–6 (8–4)	39 – McMahon	12 – Lattimore	5 – McMahon	SJB Pavilion (3,335); Oxford, MS
February 19, 2026; 8:00 p.m., ESPN	No. 17	No. 7 LSU	L 70–78	21–7 (8–5)	25 – McMahon	8 – Tied	4 – Lattimore	SJB Pavilion (7,424); Oxford, MS
February 22, 2026; 11:00 a.m., ESPN	No. 17	at No. 3 South Carolina	L 48–85	21–8 (8–6)	12 – Iwuala	10 – Iwuala	6 – McMahon	Colonial Life Arena (18,000); Columbia, SC
February 26, 2026; 5:00 p.m., SECN	No. 19	at Florida	L 67–74	21–9 (8–7)	25 – Thompson	7 – Lattimore	4 – Powe	O'Connell Center (1,681); Gainesville, FL
March 1, 2026; 2:00 p.m., SECN+/ESPN+	No. 19	Texas A&M	L 58–66	21–10 (8–8)	19 – McMahon	9 – McMahon	3 – Tied	SJB Pavilion (3,181); Oxford, MS
SEC tournament
March 5, 2026; 5:00 p.m., SECN	(7) No. 24	vs. (15) Auburn; Second round	W 73–57	22–10	18 – Iwuala	9 – Iwuala	6 – McMahon	Bon Secours Wellness Arena; Greenville, SC
March 6, 2026; 5:00 p.m., SECN	(7) No. 24	vs. (2) No. 5 Vanderbilt; Quarterfinals	W 89–78	23–10	28 – Lattimore	8 – Lattimore	7 – McMahon	Bon Secours Wellness Arena; Greenville, SC
March 7, 2026; 6:00 p.m., ESPN2	(7) No. 24	vs. (3) No. 4 Texas; Semifinals	L 68–85	23–11	20 – Tied	8 – Iwuala	5 – DeShields	Bon Secours Wellness Arena; Greenville, SC
NCAA tournament
March 20, 2026; 2:30 p.m., ESPN2	(5 S2) No. 19	vs. (12 S2) Gonzaga; First round	W 81–66	24–11	15 – Lattimore	8 – Tied	4 – DeShields	Williams Arena; Minneapolis, MN
March 22, 2026; 1:00 p.m., ESPN	(5 S2) No. 19	at (4 S2) No. 18 Minnesota; Second round	L 63–65	24–12	18 – Thienou	6 – Iwuala	4 – McMahon	Williams Arena (10,763); Minneapolis, MN
*Non-conference game. ^{#}Rankings from AP poll. (#) Tournament seedings in parentheses. S2=Sacramento 2. All times are in Central.

== Rankings ==
Ranking movements Legend: ██ Increase in ranking ██ Decrease in ranking
	Week																				
Poll	Pre	1	2	3	4	5	6	7	8	9	10	11	12	13	14	15	16	17	18	19	Final
AP	12	13	13	13	13	17	14	15	15*	18	16	18	17	13	14	17	19	24	19	19	
Coaches	14	16	14	13	13	16	14	17	17	17	16	18	17	14	16	17	20	23	20	20	

*AP did not release a week 8 poll.

== See also ==
- 2025–26 Ole Miss Rebels men's basketball team
