= 2019–20 Ole Miss Rebels women's basketball team =

Intercollegiate basketball season

2019–20 Ole Miss Rebels women's basketball
- Conference: Southeastern Conference
- Record: 7–23 (0–16 SEC)
- Head coach: Yolett McPhee-McCuin (2nd season)
- Assistant coaches: Chris Ayers; Tony Greene; Armintie Herrington
- Home arena: The Pavilion at Ole Miss

2019–20 SEC women's basketball standings
	Conf.				Overall
Team	W		L	PCT	W		L	PCT
No. 1 South Carolina †	16	–	0	1.000	32	–	1	.970
No. 9 Mississippi State	13	–	3	.813	27	–	6	.818
No. 24 Arkansas	10	–	6	.625	24	–	8	.750
No. 16 Kentucky	10	–	6	.625	22	–	8	.733
No. 19 Texas A&M	10	–	6	.625	22	–	8	.733
Tennessee	10	–	6	.625	21	–	10	.677
LSU	9	–	7	.563	20	–	10	.667
Alabama	8	–	8	.500	18	–	12	.600
Georgia	7	–	9	.438	17	–	14	.548
Florida	6	–	10	.375	15	–	15	.500
Missouri	5	–	11	.313	9	–	22	.290
Vanderbilt	4	–	12	.250	14	–	16	.467
Auburn	4	–	12	.250	11	–	18	.379
Ole Miss	0	–	16	.000	7	–	23	.233
† 2020 SEC tournament winner Rankings from AP poll

The 2019–20 Ole Miss Rebels women's basketball team represented the University of Mississippi during the 2019–20 NCAA Division I women's basketball season. The Rebels, led by second-year head coach Yolett McPhee-McCuin, played their home games at The Pavilion at Ole Miss and competed as members of the Southeastern Conference (SEC).

They finished the season with a record of 7–23, 0–16 in the SEC, and were eliminated in the first round of the SEC women's tournament by Missouri.

== Previous season ==
The Rebels finished the season with a 9–22 overall record and a 3–13 record in conference play. The Rebels lost to Florida in the First Round of the SEC tournament. The Rebels were not invited to the postseason.

== Offseason ==
=== Departures ===
Name	Number	Pos.	Height	Year	Hometown	Reason for departure
Gabby Crawford	0	F	6'2"	Freshman	Munford, TN	Transferred to Morehead State
Jhileiya Dunlap	3	F	6'2"	Junior	Columbia, SC	Transferred to Troy
Crystal Allen	5	G	5'9"	RS Senior	Fort Worth, TX	Graduated
Cecilia Muhate	10	F	6'2"	Senior	Madrid, Spain	Graduated
Mahogany Matthews	20	F	6'1"	Freshman	Raeford, NC	Transferred to Marshall
Shandricka Sessom	23	G	5'10"	RS Senior	Byhalia, MS	Graduated
Shannon Dozier	24	G	5'10"	Junior	Washington, D.C.	Transferred to Delaware State
La'Karis Salter	33	F	6'1"	RS Senior	Tallahassee, FL	Graduated

=== 2019 recruiting class ===
College recruiting information
Name	Hometown	School	Height	Weight	Commit date
Sarah Dumitrescu; G	Bucharest, Romania	IMG Academy	6 ft 0 in (1.83 m)	N/A	
Sarah Dumitrescu; G	Recruit ratings: ESPN: (89)				
Jayla Alexander; PG	Pearl, MS	Pearl High School	5 ft 9 in (1.75 m)	N/A	
Jayla Alexander; PG	Recruit ratings: No ratings found				
Jordan Berry; G	New Orleans, LA	Mount Carmel Academy	5 ft 7 in (1.70 m)	N/A	
Jordan Berry; G	Recruit ratings: No ratings found				
Bryn Parker; G	Scottsdale, AZ	Pinnacle High School	6 ft 0 in (1.83 m)	N/A	
Bryn Parker; G	Recruit ratings: No ratings found				
Overall recruit ranking:
Note: In many cases, Scout, Rivals, 247Sports, On3, and ESPN may conflict in their listings of height and weight.; In these cases, the average was taken. ESPN grades are on a 100-point scale.; Sources:

=== Incoming transfers ===
Name	Number	Pos.	Height	Year	Hometown	Previous School
Donnetta Johnson	3	G	5'11"	Sophomore	Queens, NY	Georgia; will redshirt in 2019–20 due to transfer rules.
Valerie Nesbitt	4	G	5'6"	Junior	Nassau, Bahamas	Chipola College
Dominique Banks	13	F	6'5"	Junior	Atlanta, GA	Gulf Coast State College
Andeija Puckett	40	C	6'2"	Junior	Griffin, GA	Cincinnati; will redshirt in 2019–20 due to transfer rules.

== Preseason ==
=== SEC media poll ===
The SEC media poll was released on October 15, 2019.

Media poll
Predicted finish	Team
1	South Carolina
2	Texas A&M
3	Mississippi State
4	Kentucky
5	Arkansas
6	Tennessee
7	Auburn
8	LSU
9	Missouri
10	Georgia
11	Alabama
12	Florida
13	Ole Miss
14	Vanderbilt

== Roster ==
2019–20 Ole Miss Rebels women's basketball team
Players
Coaches

Pos.	#	Name	Height	Year	Previous school	Hometown
G	1	Sarah Dumitrescu (injured)	6 ft 0 in (1.83 m)	Fr	IMG Academy	Bucharest, Romania
G	2	Mimi Reid	5 ft 8 in (1.73 m)	RS So	The Patrick School	Bronx, NY
G	3	Donnetta Johnson (redshirt)	5 ft 11 in (1.8 m)	So	Baldwin HS; Georgia	Queens, NY
G	4	Valerie Nesbitt	5 ft 6 in (1.68 m)	Jr	Chipola College	Nassau, Bahamas
G	11	Tootie Rankin	5 ft 7 in (1.7 m)	Jr	Southwest Mississippi CC	Waynesboro, MS
G	12	Jordan Berry	5 ft 7 in (1.7 m)	Fr	Mount Carmel Academy	New Orleans, LA
F	13	Dominique Banks	6 ft 5 in (1.96 m)	Jr	Gulf Coast State College	Atlanta, GA
PG	20	Jayla Alexander	5 ft 9 in (1.75 m)	Fr	Pearl HS	Pearl, MS
G	21	Taylor Smith	5 ft 8 in (1.73 m)	So	Marietta HS	Marietta, GA
G	25	Bryn Parker	6 ft 0 in (1.83 m)	Fr	Pinnacle HS	Scottsdale, AZ
G	31	Deja Cage	5 ft 8 in (1.73 m)	RS Jr	Morgan Park HS; DePaul	Chicago, IL
F	32	Iyanla Kitchens	6 ft 2 in (1.88 m)	So	Arabia Mountain HS	Lithonia, GA
C	40	Andeija Puckett (redshirt)	6 ft 2 in (1.88 m)	Jr	Griffin HS; Cincinnati	Griffin, GA
G	44	Torri Lewis	5 ft 11 in (1.8 m)	RS Sr	Homeschool	Olive Branch, MS

Head coach

- Yolett McPhee-McCuin (Rhode Island)

Assistant coach(es)

- Chris Ayers (Florida A&M)
- Tony Greene (Langston)
- Armintie Herrington (Mississippi)

Legend

- (C) Team captain
- (S) Suspended
- (I) Ineligible
- (W) Walk-on
- Injured
- Current redshirt

Roster

== Schedule ==
Date time, TV	Rank^{#}	Opponent^{#}	Result	Record	High points	High rebounds	High assists	Site (attendance) city, state
Exhibition
November 1, 2019*; 7:00 pm		Clark Atlanta	W 79–52		–	–	–	The Pavilion at Ole Miss; Oxford, MS
Non-conference regular season
November 5, 2019*; 6:00 pm, SECN+		Mississippi Valley State	W 72–53	1–0	18 – Smith	9 – Banks	6 – Reid	The Pavilion at Ole Miss (1,239); Oxford, MS
November 10, 2019*; 2:00 pm, SECN+		Louisiana–Monroe	W 66–42	2–0	21 – Cage	10 – Kitchens	3 – Tied	The Pavilion at Ole Miss (1,448); Oxford, MS
November 15, 2019*; 3:00 pm, SECN+		New Orleans	L 64–69	2–1	21 – Alexander	11 – Dumitrescu	6 – Reid	The Pavilion at Ole Miss (1,630); Oxford, MS
November 19, 2019*; 6:00 pm		at Southern Miss	L 53–59	2–2	13 – Banks	9 – Dumitrescu	3 – Tied	Reed Green Coliseum (1,843); Hattiesburg, MS
November 23, 2019*; 2:00 pm, SECN+		Louisiana Tech	W 76–53	3–2	30 – Cage	8 – Tied	8 – Nesbitt	The Pavilion at Ole Miss (1,019); Oxford, MS
November 26, 2019*; 6:00 pm, SECN+		Sam Houston State	W 75–69	4–2	21 – Cage	5 – Tied	3 – Tied	The Pavilion at Ole Miss (1,320); Oxford, MS
November 29, 2019*; 7:00 pm		vs. Alcorn State; Daytona Beach Invitational	W 73–55	5–2	20 – Nesbitt	14 – Banks	5 – Alexander	Ocean Center (83); Daytona Beach, FL
November 30, 2019*; 4:45 pm		vs. Pittsburgh; Daytona Beach Invitational	L 50–58	5–3	14 – Nesbitt	6 – Nesbitt	3 – Cage	Ocean Center (97); Daytona Beach, FL
December 4, 2019*; 7:00 pm, FSSW+		at Texas Tech; Big 12/SEC Women's Challenge	L 48–84	5–4	12 – Smith	12 – Banks	3 – Nesbitt	United Supermarkets Arena (4,212); Lubbock, TX
December 14, 2019*; 5:00 pm, SECN+		Southeast Missouri State	L 53–70	5–5	15 – Nesbitt	6 – Tied	5 – Reid	The Pavilion at Ole Miss (1,253); Oxford, MS
December 16, 2019*; 11:00 am, SECN+		Georgia Southern	W 69–66 ^{OT}	6–5	16 – Nesbitt	6 – Tied	6 – Nesbitt	The Pavilion at Ole Miss (6,574); Oxford, MS
December 20, 2019*; 7:00 pm, SECN+		Louisiana	L 42–53	6–6	11 – Lewis	5 – Tied	4 – Nesbitt	The Pavilion at Ole Miss (1,123); Oxford, MS
December 28, 2019*; 2:00 pm, SECN+		Alabama State	W 93–66	7–6	20 – Cage	8 – Nesbitt	10 – Reid	The Pavilion at Ole Miss (1,166); Oxford, MS
SEC regular season
January 2, 2020; 6:15 pm, SECN+		Georgia	L 51–58	7–7 (0–1)	15 – Nesbitt	5 – Tied	3 – Tied	The Pavilion at Ole Miss (1,093); Oxford, MS
January 6, 2020; 6:00 pm, SECN		at No. 10 Texas A&M	L 35–79	7–8 (0–2)	15 – Cage	8 – Cage	3 – Reid	Reed Arena (4,006); College Station, TX
January 9, 2020; 7:00 pm, SECN+		No. 23 Tennessee	L 28–84	7–9 (0–3)	12 – Banks	7 – Banks	2 – Tied	The Pavilion at Ole Miss (1,373); Oxford, MS
January 12, 2020; 2:00 pm, SECN+		at LSU	L 44–52	7–10 (0–4)	20 – Cage	8 – Parker	3 – Reid	Pete Maravich Assembly Center (2,030); Baton Rouge, LA
January 19, 2020; 2:00 pm, SECN+		Missouri	L 57–71	7–11 (0–5)	19 – Cage	6 – Banks	8 – Alexander	The Pavilion at Ole Miss (1,287); Oxford, MS
January 23, 2020; 6:00 pm, SECN+		at Auburn	L 43–59	7–12 (0–6)	12 – Cage	6 – Tied	6 – Reid	Auburn Arena (1,483); Auburn, AL
January 26, 2020; 4:00 pm, SECN		at No. 9 Mississippi State	L 39–80	7–13 (0–7)	11 – Cage	7 – Banks	5 – Alexander	Humphrey Coliseum (9,503); Starkville, MS
January 30, 2020; 7:00 pm, SECN+		No. 1 South Carolina	L 32–87	7–14 (0–8)	12 – Reid	5 – Kitchens	4 – Cage	The Pavilion at Ole Miss (1,225); Oxford, MS
February 2, 2020; 2:00 pm, SECN+		Alabama	L 56–57	7–15 (0–9)	15 – Tied	6 – Kitchens	6 – Reid	The Pavilion at Ole Miss (1,207); Oxford, MS
February 9, 2020; 4:00 pm, SECN		at Vanderbilt	L 47–63	7–16 (0–10)	13 – Alexander	9 – Alexander	5 – Reid	Memorial Gymnasium (2,846); Nashville, TN
February 13, 2020; 5:00 pm, SECN+		at Florida	L 72–74	7–17 (0–11)	23 – Cage	5 – Tied	4 – Tied	O'Connell Center (1,008); Gainesville, FL
February 16, 2020; 2:00 pm, SECN		No. 23 Arkansas	L 64–108	7–18 (0–12)	17 – Smith	8 – Kitchens	5 – Tied	The Pavilion at Ole Miss (1,383); Oxford, MS
February 20, 2020; 7:00 pm, SECN+		No. 14 Kentucky	L 52–94	7–19 (0–13)	12 – Tied	8 – Smith	4 – Reid	The Pavilion at Ole Miss (1,180); Oxford, MS
February 23, 2020; 5:00 pm, SECN		at Missouri	L 67–82	7–20 (0–14)	23 – Alexander	5 – Alexander	7 – Reid	Mizzou Arena (4,027); Columbia, MO
February 27, 2020; 6:00 pm, SECN+		at Tennessee	L 66–77	7–21 (0–15)	22 – Cage	7 – Alexander	4 – Reid	Thompson–Boling Arena (8,255); Knoxville, TN
March 1, 2020; 1:40 pm, SECN+		No. 10 Mississippi State	L 59–84	7–22 (0–16)	19 – Cage	7 – Banks	8 – Reid	The Pavilion at Ole Miss (2,974); Oxford, MS
SEC Tournament
March 4, 2020; 12:30 pm, SECN	(14)	vs. (11) Missouri; First Round	L 53–64	7–23	15 – Reid	8 – Banks	7 – Reid	Bon Secours Wellness Arena; Greenville, SC
*Non-conference game. ^{#}Rankings from AP Poll. (#) Tournament seedings in parentheses. All times are in Central Time.
