= 2024–25 Virginia Cavaliers women's basketball team =

Intercollegiate basketball season

2024–25 Virginia Cavaliers women's basketball
- Conference: Atlantic Coast Conference
- Record: 17–15 (8–10 ACC)
- Head coach: Amaka Agugua-Hamilton (3rd season)
- Associate head coach: CJ Jones (3rd season)
- Assistant coaches: Tori Jankoska (3rd season); Alysiah Bond (3rd season); Janko Popovic (2nd season)
- Home arena: John Paul Jones Arena

2024–25 ACC women's basketball standings
	Conf.				Overall
Team	W		L	PCT	W		L	PCT
No. 9 NC State	16	–	2	.889	28	–	7	.800
No. 8 Notre Dame	16	–	2	.889	28	–	6	.824
No. 7 Duke †	14	–	4	.778	29	–	8	.784
No. 22 Florida State	13	–	5	.722	24	–	9	.727
No. 12 North Carolina	13	–	5	.722	29	–	8	.784
Louisville	13	–	5	.722	22	–	11	.667
California	12	–	6	.667	25	–	9	.735
Virginia Tech	9	–	9	.500	19	–	13	.594
Georgia Tech	9	–	9	.500	22	–	11	.667
Virginia	8	–	10	.444	17	–	15	.531
Stanford	8	–	10	.444	16	–	15	.516
Boston College	6	–	12	.333	16	–	18	.471
Syracuse	6	–	12	.333	12	–	18	.400
Clemson	6	–	12	.333	14	–	17	.452
Pittsburgh	5	–	13	.278	13	–	19	.406
Miami (FL)	4	–	14	.222	14	–	15	.483
Wake Forest	2	–	16	.111	9	–	20	.310
SMU	2	–	16	.111	10	–	20	.333
† 2025 ACC tournament winner Rankings from AP Poll

The 2024–25 Virginia Cavaliers women's basketball team represented the University of Virginia during the 2024–25 NCAA Division I women's basketball season. The Cavaliers were led by third-year head coach Amaka Agugua-Hamilton, and played their home games at John Paul Jones Arena in Charlottesville, Virginia as members of the Atlantic Coast Conference.

The Cavaliers started the season with a defeat of American before traveling to tenth-ranked Oklahoma. The trip ended in a 95–51 defeat at the hands of the Sooners. The Cavaliers won four straight games after that, before traveling to San Juan, Puerto Rico to participate in the Puerto Rico Shootout. The team went 1–2 in the Shootout, defeating Green Bay but losing to Washington State and Wyoming. Upon their return, the Cavaliers participated in the ACC–SEC Challenge where they lost to Auburn. Their ACC opener followed, which was a 72–52 loss to Boston College. Virginia turned its fortunes around by winning five of its next seven games, including three ACC wins. Their losses were to third- ranked Notre Dame and fourteenth-ranked Duke. They also won a rivalry game at Virginia Tech during this period. Their fortunes turned as they went 1–6 over their next seven games, with their only win being a 70–67 victory over Syracuse. The run included losses against twenty first-ranked NC State, eighteenth-ranked Georgia Tech, twenty second-ranked Florida State, and a loss in a rivalry re-match with Virginia Tech. The Cavaliers' fortunes changed again as they went 4–1 in their final five games, with their only loss coming against California, 76–70. The highlight of the wins was a final day victory over eighth-ranked North Carolina.

The Cavaliers finished the season 17–15 overall and 8–10 in ACC play to finish in a tie for tenth place. As the tenth seed in the ACC tournament, they faced fifteenth seed Pittsburgh in the First Round. The Cavaliers won 64–50 to advance to the second round where they lost to California 75–58. They were not invited to the NCAA tournament or the WBIT.

== Previous season ==
The Cavaliers finished the season 16–16 overall and 7–11 in ACC play to finish in a tie for tenth place. As the eleventh seed in the ACC tournament, they lost to fourteenth seed Wake Forest in the first round. They received an at-large invitation to the inaugural WBIT. As a fourth seed they defeated High Point in the first round before losing to first seed Villanova to end their season.

== Offseason ==
=== Departures ===
Departures
Name	Number	Pos.	Height	Year	Hometown	Reason for departure
Mir McLean	10	G/F	5'11"	Senior	Baltimore, Maryland	Transferred to Maryland
Kaydan Lawson	14	G	6'0"	Senior	Cleveland, Ohio	Transferred to Seton Hall
Camryn Taylor	20	F	6'2"	Graduate Student	Peoria, Illinois	Graduated
Alexia Smith	23	G	5'8"	Senior	Columbus, Ohio	Transferred to Oklahoma State
Cady Pauley	32	G	5'11"	Sophomore	Milan, Missouri	Transferred to Missouri State
Sam Brunelle	33	F	6'2"	Graduate Student	Ruckersville, Virginia	Graduated
London Clarkson	34	F	6'2"	Graduate Student	Pflugerville, Texas	Graduated

=== Incoming transfers ===
Incoming transfers
Name	Number	Pos.	Height	Year	Hometown	Previous school
Rylee Grays	2	F	6'4"	Sophomore	Pearland, Texas	North Carolina
Hawa Doumbouya	7	C	6'7"	Sophomore	Bronx, New York	Maryland
Casey Valenti-Paea	10	G	5'9"	Graduate Student	Melbourne, Australia	Long Beach State
Latasha Lattimore	35	F	6'4"	Senior	Toronto, Canada	Miami (FL)

=== Recruiting class ===
College recruiting information
Name	Hometown	School	Height	Weight	Commit date
Payton Dunbar; G	Narrows, Virginia	Jefferson Christian	5 ft 11 in (1.80 m)	N/A	Jul 18, 2024
Payton Dunbar; G	Recruit ratings: ESPN: (NR)				
Breona Hurd; F	Waynesville, Missouri	Waynesville	6 ft 2 in (1.88 m)	N/A	Jul 4, 2022
Breona Hurd; F	Recruit ratings: ESPN: (91)				
Kamryn Kitchen; G	Charlotte, North Carolina	Independence	5 ft 9 in (1.75 m)	N/A	Jun 5, 2024
Kamryn Kitchen; G	Recruit ratings: ESPN: (NR)				
Overall recruit ranking:
Note: In many cases, Scout, Rivals, 247Sports, On3, and ESPN may conflict in their listings of height and weight.; In these cases, the average was taken. ESPN grades are on a 100-point scale.; Sources:

== Roster ==
2024–25 Virginia Cavaliers women's basketball team
Players
Coaches

Pos.	#	Name	Height	Year	Previous school	Hometown
G	0	Olivia McGhee	6 ft 2 in (1.88 m)	So	IMG Academy	Louisa, VA
G	1	Paris Clark	5 ft 8 in (1.73 m)	Jr	Long Island Lutheran; Arizona	New York, NY
F	2	Rylee Grays	6 ft 4 in (1.93 m)	So	Pearland; North Carolina	Pearland, TX
G	4	Jillian Brown	5 ft 10 in (1.78 m)	Sr	East Grand Rapids; Northwestern	Grand Rapids, MI
G	5	Yonta Vaughn	5 ft 8 in (1.73 m)	Jr	Bishop McNamara	District Heights, MD
C	7	Hawa Doumbouya	6 ft 7 in (2.01 m)	So	Our Lady of Mount Carmel; Maryland	Bronx, NY
F	8	Edessa Noyan	6 ft 3 in (1.91 m)	So	Täljegymnasiet	Södertälje, Sweden
G	10	Casey Valenti-Paea	5 ft 9 in (1.75 m)	GS	Maribryon College; Long Beach State	Melbourne, Australia
G	12	Kamryn Kitchen	5 ft 9 in (1.75 m)	Fr	Independence	Charlotte, NC
G	21	Kymora Johnson	5 ft 7 in (1.7 m)	So	St. Anne's-Belfield	Charlottesville, VA
G	23	Payton Dunbar	5 ft 11 in (1.8 m)	Fr	Jefferson Christian	Narrows, VA
F	32	Breona Hurd	6 ft 2 in (1.88 m)	Fr	Waynesville	Waynesville, MO
F	35	Latasha Lattimore	6 ft 4 in (1.93 m)	Sr	Royal Crown Academic School; Miami (FL)	Toronto, Canada
C	41	Taylor Lauterbach	6 ft 7 in (2.01 m)	GS	Appleton West; Kansas State	Appleton, WI

Head coach

- Amaka Agugua-Hamilton (Hofstra)

Assistant coach(es)

- CJ Jones (Francis Marion)
- Tori Jankoska (Michigan State)
- Alysiah Bond (Ohio State)
- Janko Popovic (Winthrop)

Legend

- (C) Team captain
- (S) Suspended
- (I) Ineligible
- (W) Walk-on
- Injured
- Current redshirt

Roster

== Schedule ==
Date time, TV	Rank^{#}	Opponent^{#}	Result	Record	High points	High rebounds	High assists	Site (attendance) city, state
Exhibition
October 31, 2024*; 6:00 p.m.		Barton	W 104–46	–	–	–	–	John Paul Jones Arena; Charlottesville, VA
Regular season
November 4, 2024*; 7:00 p.m., ACCNX		American	W 104–68	1–0	21 – Johnson	13 – Lauterbach	9 – Johnson	John Paul Jones Arena (3,974); Charlottesville, VA
November 8, 2024*; 9:00 p.m., SECN		at No. 10 Oklahoma	L 51–95	1–1	15 – Hurd	5 – Tied	4 – Johnson	Lloyd Noble Center (4,012); Norman, OK
November 13, 2024*; 7:00 p.m., ACCNX		Radford	W 83–41	2–1	17 – Johnson	10 – Lattimore	6 – Clark	John Paul Jones Arena (3,754); Charlottesville, VA
November 17, 2024*; 2:00 p.m., ACCNX		La Salle	W 76–47	3–1	20 – Johnson	12 – Lattimore	4 – Tied	John Paul Jones Arena (4,054); Charlottesville, VA
November 20, 2024*; 7:00 p.m., ACCNX		Alabama State	W 85–50	4–1	22 – Johnson	13 – Lattimore	7 – Vaughn	John Paul Jones Arena (3,675); Charlottesville, VA
November 24, 2024*; 4:00 p.m., ACCNX		Bethune–Cookman	W 82–48	5–1	20 – McGhee	13 – Lattimore	9 – Vaughn	John Paul Jones Arena (3,883); Charlottesville, VA
November 28, 2024*; 11:00 a.m., FloHoops		vs. Green Bay; Puerto Rico Shootout	W 66–61	6–1	17 – Johnson	9 – Lauterbach	4 – Vaughn	Coliseo Guillermo Angulo (250); San Juan, PR
November 29, 2024*; 4:00 p.m., FloHoops		vs. Washington State; Puerto Rico Shootout	L 74–75	6–2	20 – Johnson	10 – Lattimore	5 – Johnson	Coliseo Guillermo Angulo (250); San Juan, PR
November 30, 2024*; 12:30 p.m., FloHoops		vs. Wyoming; Puerto Rico Shootout	L 66–71	6–3	26 – Johnson	9 – Johnson	4 – Johnson	Coliseo Guillermo Angulo (250); San Juan, PR
December 5, 2024*; 6:00 p.m., ACCN		Auburn; ACC–SEC Challenge	L 57–66	6–4	22 – Johnson	13 – Johnson	5 – Vaughn	John Paul Jones Arena (3,994); Charlottesville, VA
December 8, 2024; 2:00 p.m., ACCNX		Boston College	L 57–72	6–5 (0–1)	23 – Lattimore	9 – Lattimore	4 – Johnson	John Paul Jones Arena (3,948); Charlottesville, VA
December 17, 2024*; 7:00 p.m., ACCNX		Maryland-Eastern Shore	W 80–64	7–5	24 – Johnson	15 – Lattimore	6 – Johnson	John Paul Jones Arena (3,681); Charlottesville, VA
December 21, 2024*; 1:00 p.m., ACCNX		Coppin State	W 74–66	8–5	18 – Lattimore	10 – Lattimore	9 – Johnson	John Paul Jones Arena (4,286); Charlottesville, VA
December 29, 2024; 12:00 p.m., ACCN		at No. 3 Notre Dame	L 54–95	8–6 (0–2)	12 – Johnson	7 – Hurd	3 – Tied	Purcell Pavilion (9,149); Notre Dame, IN
January 2, 2025; 7:00 p.m., ACCNX		Wake Forest	W 69–46	9–6 (1–2)	16 – Johnson	7 – Tied	8 – Johnson	John Paul Jones Arena (4,105); Charlottesville, VA
January 9, 2025; 7:00 p.m., ACCNX		at Clemson	W 67–60	10–6 (2–2)	28 – Johnson	11 – Lattimore	6 – Johnson	Littlejohn Coliseum (1,821); Clemson, SC
January 12, 2025; 12:00 p.m., ACCN		No. 14 Duke	L 55–60	10–7 (2–3)	14 – Tied	7 – Lattimore	6 – Johnson	John Paul Jones Arena (5,203); Charlottesville, VA
January 16, 2025; 6:00 p.m., ACCNX		at Virginia Tech; Rivalry	W 73–65	11–7 (3–3)	24 – Lattimore	15 – Lattimore	3 – Tied	Cassell Coliseum (5,473); Blacksburg, VA
January 19, 2025; 2:00 p.m., The CW		at No. 21 NC State	L 68–73	11–8 (3–4)	21 – Lattimore	9 – Lattimore	5 – Clark	Reynolds Coliseum (5,500); Raleigh, NC
January 23, 2025; 7:00 p.m., ACCNX		No. 18 Georgia Tech	L 62–75	11–9 (3–5)	22 – Johnson	10 – Lattimore	5 – Johnson	John Paul Jones Arena (4,022); Charlottesville, VA
January 26, 2025; 2:00 p.m., The CW		Louisville	L 65–68	11–10 (3–6)	19 – Clark	7 – Clark	8 – Johnson	John Paul Jones Arena (5,551); Charlottesville, VA
January 30, 2025; 7:00 p.m., ACCNX		at Miami (FL)	L 74–77	11–11 (3–7)	25 – Lattimore	11 – Johnson	7 – Clark	Watsco Center (1,925); Coral Gables, FL
February 2, 2025; 12:00 p.m., ACCN		at Syracuse	W 70–67	12–11 (4–7)	26 – Lattimore	6 – Tied	8 – Johnson	JMA Wireless Dome (3,994); Syracuse, NY
February 6, 2025; 7:00 p.m., ACCNX		No. 22 Florida State	L 68–101	12–12 (4–8)	16 – Tied	9 – Noyan	6 – Johnson	John Paul Jones Arena (4,198); Charlottesville, VA
February 9, 2025; 12:00 p.m., ACCN		Virginia Tech; Rivalry	L 62–87	12–13 (4–9)	16 – Tied	5 – Tied	5 – Johnson	John Paul Jones Arena (5,639); Charlottesville, VA
February 16, 2025; 2:00 p.m., ACCN		at Pittsburgh	W 80–67	13–13 (5–9)	30 – Lattimore	11 – Tied	11 – Johnson	Peterson Events Center (1,041); Pittsburgh, PA
February 20, 2025; 7:00 p.m., ACCNX		California	L 70–76	13–14 (5–10)	24 – Johnson	7 – Johnson	5 – Tied	John Paul Jones Arena (5,496); Charlottesville, VA
February 23, 2025; 6:00 p.m., ACCNX		Stanford	W 89–69	14–14 (6–10)	33 – Johnson	12 – Lattimore	12 – Johnson	John Paul Jones Arena (4,797); Charlottesville, VA
February 27, 2025; 8:00 p.m., ACCNX		at SMU	W 63–51	15–14 (7–10)	16 – Hurd	10 – Johnson	7 – Johnson	Moody Coliseum (1,251); University Park, TX
March 2, 2025; 2:00 p.m., The CW		at No. 8 North Carolina	W 78–75	16–14 (8–10)	23 – Lattimore	9 – Johnson	11 – Johnson	Carmichael Arena (4,414); Chapel Hill, NC
ACC Women's Tournament
March 5, 2025*; 3:30 p.m., ACCN	(10)	vs. (15) Pittsburgh; First Round	W 64–50	17–14	17 – Johnson	11 – Lattimore	7 – Johnson	Greensboro Coliseum (6,932); Greensboro, NC
March 6, 2025*; 5:00 p.m., ACCN	(10)	vs. (7) California; Second Round	L 58–75	17–15	18 – Johnson	8 – Johnson	4 – Clark	Greensboro Coliseum (5,828); Greensboro, NC
*Non-conference game. ^{#}Rankings from AP Poll. (#) Tournament seedings in parentheses. All times are in Eastern.
