= Yolett McPhee-McCuin =

Bahamian-American basketball coach (born 1982)

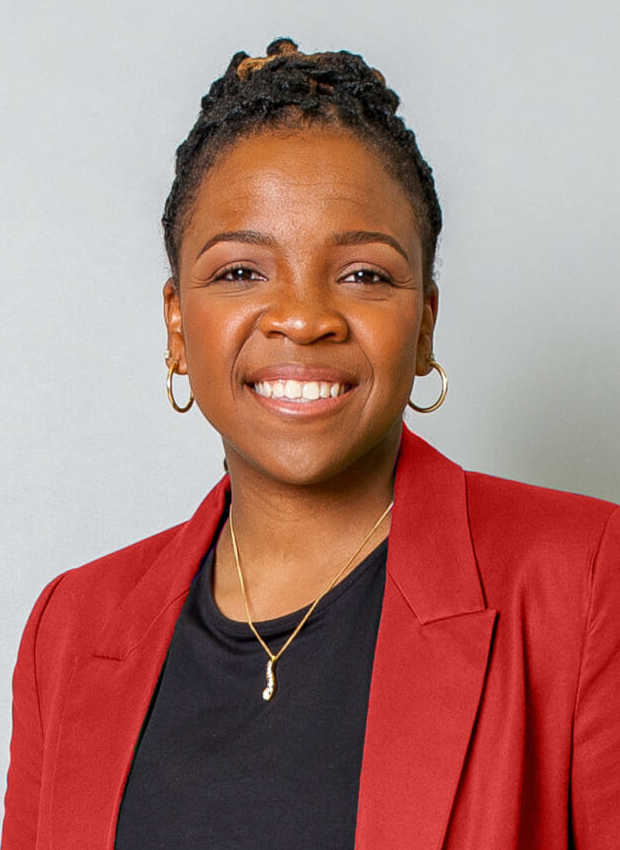
- McPhee-McCuin in 2018

Current position
- Title: Head coach
- Team: Ole Miss
- Conference: SEC
- Record: 149–107 (.582)
- Annual salary: $1.035 million

Biographical details
- Born: April 30, 1982 (age 44); Freeport, The Bahamas
- Education: University of Rhode Island (BBM); University of Arkansas at Pine Bluff (MPEd)

Playing career
- 2000–2002: Miami Dade CC
- 2002–2004: Rhode Island
- Position: Point guard

Coaching career (HC unless noted)
- 2004–2005: Frank Phillips (assistant)
- 2005–2007: Arkansas–Pine Bluff (assistant)
- 2007–2008: Portland (assistant)
- 2008–2010: Pittsburgh (assistant)
- 2010–2013: Clemson (assistant)
- 2013–2018: Jacksonville
- 2014–2017: The Bahamas
- 2018–present: Ole Miss
- 2024–present: The Bahamas

Head coaching record
- Overall: 243–170 (.588)
- Tournaments: 6–6 NCAA Division I (.500); 4–3 WNIT (.571)

Yolett Alessia McPhee-McCuin (born April 30, 1982) is a Bahamian-American basketball coach who is the current head coach of the Ole Miss Rebels women's basketball team. Her team at Jacksonville University won the 2016 ASUN Conference Tournament and advanced to the NCAA Tournament.

== Early life and education ==
Yolett Alessia McPhee was born April 30, 1982, in Freeport, Bahamas. Her parents both worked at Grand Bahama Catholic High School in Freeport: Her father Gladstone "Moon" McPhee was head boys' basketball coach, and her mother Daisy McPhee was school principal.

McPhee-McCuin graduated from Grand Bahama Catholic in 2000. She initially signed with and played for Florida Atlantic University out of high school for her freshman year in 2000. Then she attended Miami-Dade Community College from 2001 to 2002, playing at point guard on the women's basketball team. In the 2001–02 season, McPhee-McCuin earned all-state honors and averaged 9.0 points and 6.9 assists, ranking third nationally in assists per game. She graduated from Miami-Dade with a 4.0 GPA in 2002.

From 2002 to 2004, McPhee-McCuin attended the University of Rhode Island and played at point guard for the Rhode Island Rams. She averaged 3.2 points, 1.1 rebounds, and 1.8 assists. In her senior season of 2003–04, McPhee played in 29 games with 15 starts, averaging 2.7 points, 0.9 rebounds, and 2.0 assists. She graduated from Rhode Island in 2004 with a B.A. in business management and the University of Arkansas at Pine Bluff in 2007 with a master's degree in secondary school physical education.

== Coaching career ==
=== Early coaching career (2004–2013) ===
McPhee-McCuin began her basketball coaching career as an assistant at Frank Phillips College, a junior college in Borger, Texas, in the 2004–05 season. Her first NCAA Division I coaching job was at Arkansas–Pine Bluff, as an assistant coach from 2005 to 2007.

After one year as assistant coach at the University of Portland in 2007–08, McPhee-McCuin was an assistant coach at Pittsburgh from 2008 to 2010 under Agnus Berenato. The 2008–09 Pittsburgh Panthers finished the season 25–8 and appeared in the Sweet 16 round of the NCAA Tournament.

From 2010 to 2013, McPhee-McCuin was an assistant coach at Clemson under Itoro Umoh-Coleman.

=== Jacksonville (2013–2018) ===
McPhee-McCuin's first head coaching job was at Jacksonville University from 2013 to 2018. Inheriting a team with four straight losing seasons, McPhee-McCuin delivered a winning season by her third year in 2015–16, with a 22–11 record and NCAA Tournament appearance. The next two seasons, Jacksonville appeared in the 2017 and 2018 WNIT. In five seasons, McPhee-McCuin had a cumulative 94–63 record at Jacksonville.

=== Ole Miss (2018–present) ===
After firing Matt Insell in March 2018, the University of Mississippi hired McPhee-McCuin as head Ole Miss Rebels women's basketball coach on April 4, 2018. This hire followed a 12–19 season in 2017–18, including only one win in Southeastern Conference games.

Ole Miss had just 16 wins in McPhee-McCuin's first two seasons. But after a much improved 2020–21 season that had Ole Miss with a no. 42 NCAA Evaluation Tool ranking, Ole Miss extended McPhee-McCuin through the 2024–25 season on March 10, 2021. Ole Miss finished the season 15–12 and runners-up in the 2021 Women's National Invitation Tournament.

In 2021–22, Ole Miss improved even further with a 23–9 record and an NCAA Tournament appearance, the first such appearance since 2007. Additionally, Shakira Austin was drafted 3rd overall by the Washington Mystics in the 2022 WNBA Draft.

Then in 2022–23, Ole Miss made a second straight NCAA Tournament. On March 19, 2023, in the second round, Ole Miss as a no. 8 seed upset no. 1 Stanford 54–49, improving to 25–8 and advancing to the Sweet 16 round for the first time since 2007. In 2023–24, Ole Miss won 12 SEC games for the first time in program history and earned a 3rd seed in the SEC Tournament. They received an at-large berth in the NCAA Tournament, losing 71–56 to Notre Dame in the Second Round. In the 2024 WNBA Draft, Marquesha Davis was drafted 11th overall by the New York Liberty.

In 2024–25, Ole Miss began the season with a close 68–66 defeat to #3 USC in Paris. They also lost to UConn 73–60 and NC State 68–61 and went 9–3 in non-conference play. In SEC play, the Rebels won 10 SEC games, marking the 4th season in a row in which they have had double-digit SEC wins. They had notable wins over #8 Kentucky 66–57 and #7 LSU 85–77. In the SEC tournament, Ole Miss was a #7 seed and made it to the quarterfinals, losing 70–63 to #1 Texas. In the NCAA Tournament, the Rebels were selected as a 5-seed in the Spokane 1 Regional, their highest since 1994. They defeated 12-seed Ball State 83–65 in the First Round and 4-seed Baylor 69–63 to advance to the Sweet 16, where they lost 76–62 to UCLA, the #1 overall seed in the tournament. This was their second appearance in the Sweet 16 under Coach Yo.

== Personal life ==
McPhee-McCuin is married to Kelly McCuin. They have two children.

== Head coaching record ==
Record table
Season	Team	Overall	Conference	Standing	Postseason
Jacksonville Dolphins (Atlantic Sun Conference) (2013–2018)
2013–14	Jacksonville	13–17	10–8	5th	
2014–15	Jacksonville	12–17	6–8	T–4th	
2015–16	Jacksonville	22–11	11–3	2nd	NCAA First Round
2016–17	Jacksonville	23–9	11–3	3rd	WNIT First Round
2017–18	Jacksonville	24–9	12–2	2nd	WNIT First Round
Jacksonville:		94–63 (.599)	50–24 (.676)		
Ole Miss Rebels (Southeastern Conference) (2018–present)
2018–19	Ole Miss	9–22	3–13	T–12th	
2019–20	Ole Miss	7–23	0–16	14th	
2020–21	Ole Miss	15–12	4–10	11th	WNIT Runner-up
2021–22	Ole Miss	23–9	10–6	T–4th	NCAA First Round
2022–23	Ole Miss	25–9	11–5	4th	NCAA Sweet Sixteen
2023–24	Ole Miss	24–9	12–4	3rd	NCAA Second Round
2024–25	Ole Miss	22–11	10–6	T-6th	NCAA Sweet Sixteen
2025–26	Ole Miss	24–12	8-8	T-6th	NCAA Second Round
Ole Miss:		149–107 (.582)	60–69 (.465)		
Total:		243–170 (.588)			
National champion Postseason invitational champion Conference regular season champion Conference regular season and conference tournament champion Division regular season champion Division regular season and conference tournament champion Conference tournament champion
