= Latasha Lattimore =

Canadian basketball player (born 2003)

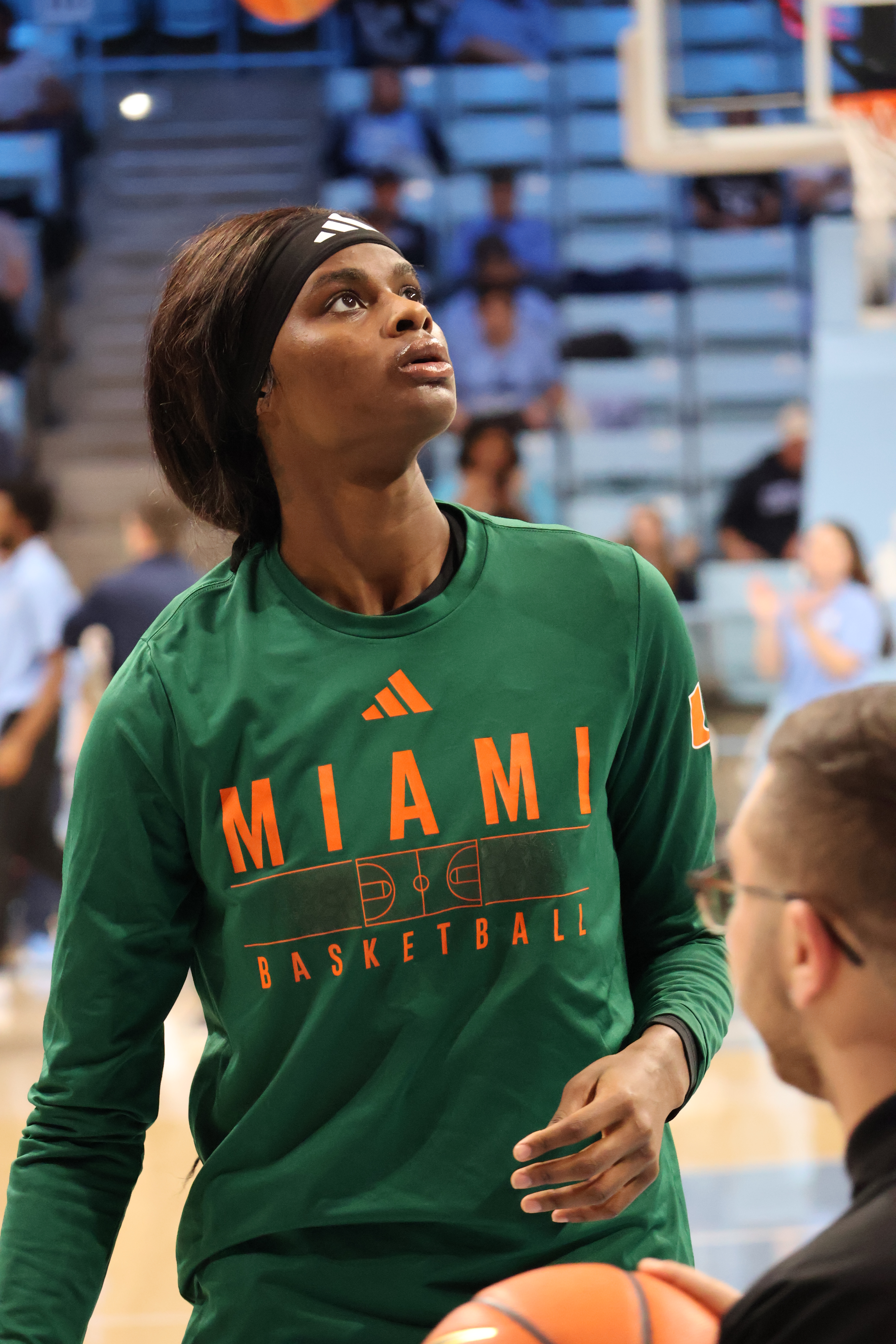
- Lattimore with Miami in 2024

Chicago Sky
- Position: Forward
- League: WNBA

Personal information
- Born: January 23, 2003 (age 23)
- Listed height: 6 ft 4 in (1.93 m)

Career information
- High school: Royal Crown Academic School
- College: Texas (2021–2022); Miami (2022–2024); Virginia (2024–2025); Ole Miss (2025–2026)
- WNBA draft: 2026: 2nd round, 21st overall pick
- Drafted by: Chicago Sky
- Stats at Basketball Reference

Latasha Lattimore (born January 23, 2003) is a Canadian professional basketball player for the Chicago Sky of the Women's National Basketball Association (WNBA). She played college basketball at Texas, Miami, Virginia, and Ole Miss.

== College career ==
Lattimore signed her national letter of intent (NLI) to play college basketball for Syracuse on May 17, 2020. However, she decommitted from Syracuse and transferred to Texas. During the 2021–22 season, in her freshman year, she averaged 3.2 points and 2.8 rebounds in 10.3 minutes per game.

Following her freshman year, she transferred to Miami. During the 2022–23 season, in her sophomore year, she averaged 7.7 points and 3.2 rebounds per game in nine games, before suffering a season-ending injury. On November 13, 2022, she scored a career-high 25 points and ten rebounds against Boston University, for her second career double-double. During the 2023–24 season, in her junior year, she averaged 5.6 points, 3.1 rebounds and 1.3 assists per game.

After two years at Miami, she transferred to Virginia on April 24, 2024. During the 2024–25 season, in her red-shirt senior year, she averaged 14.3 points and led the team with 8.2 rebounds per game.

On March 31, 2025, she transferred to Ole Miss for her final year of eligibility. During the 2025–26 season, she appeared in 36 games, with 19 starts, and averaged 10.9 points, 6.2 rebounds and 1.1 assists per game.

== Professional career ==
On April 13, 2026, Lattimore was drafted in the second round, 21st overall, by the Chicago Sky in the 2026 WNBA draft.

== Career statistics ==
Legend
GP	Games played	GS	Games started	MPG	Minutes per game	RPG	Rebounds per game
APG	Assists per game	SPG	Steals per game	BPG	Blocks per game	PPG	Points per game
TO	Turnovers per game	FG%	Field-goal percentage	3P%	3-point field-goal percentage	FT%	Free-throw percentage
**Bold**	Career best	°	League leader

=== College ===
Year	Team	GP	GS	MPG	FG%	3P%	FT%	RPG	APG	SPG	BPG	TO	PPG
2021–22	Texas	31	1	10.3	50.6	0.0	38.5	2.8	0.3	0.3	0.6	**0.9**	3.2
2022–23	Miami (FL)	9	0	14.2	**57.4**	**50.0**	**72.2**	3.2	0.4	0.6	0.8	1.0	7.7
2023–24	Miami (FL)	27	6	15.0	45.5	29.4	67.5	3.1	0.5	0.3	1.3	1.1	5.6
2024–25	Virginia	31	**29**	**30.6**	49.3	30.6	63.6	**8.2**	1.0	**0.9**	**2.2**	1.9	**14.3**
2025–26	Ole Miss	**36**	19	26.5	48.2	31.9	71.1	6.2	**1.1**	0.6	2.1	2.1	10.9
**Career**		135	55	20.5	48.9	30.3	64.3	5.0	0.7	0.5	1.5	1.7	8.6
Statistics retrieved from Sports-Reference
