= 2019–20 South Carolina Gamecocks women's basketball team =

Intercollegiate basketball season

2019–20 South Carolina Gamecocks women's basketball

Paradise Jam Champions SEC tournament champions SEC regular season champions
- Conference: Southeastern Conference

Ranking
- Coaches: No. 1
- AP: No. 1
- Record: 32–1 (16–0 SEC)
- Head coach: Dawn Staley (12th season)
- Assistant coaches: Lisa Boyer; Fred Chmiel; Jolette Law
- Home arena: Colonial Life Arena

2019–20 SEC women's basketball standings
	Conf.				Overall
Team	W		L	PCT	W		L	PCT
No. 1 South Carolina †	16	–	0	1.000	32	–	1	.970
No. 9 Mississippi State	13	–	3	.813	27	–	6	.818
No. 24 Arkansas	10	–	6	.625	24	–	8	.750
No. 16 Kentucky	10	–	6	.625	22	–	8	.733
No. 19 Texas A&M	10	–	6	.625	22	–	8	.733
Tennessee	10	–	6	.625	21	–	10	.677
LSU	9	–	7	.563	20	–	10	.667
Alabama	8	–	8	.500	18	–	12	.600
Georgia	7	–	9	.438	17	–	14	.548
Florida	6	–	10	.375	15	–	15	.500
Missouri	5	–	11	.313	9	–	22	.290
Vanderbilt	4	–	12	.250	14	–	16	.467
Auburn	4	–	12	.250	11	–	18	.379
Ole Miss	0	–	16	.000	7	–	23	.233
† 2020 SEC tournament winner Rankings from AP poll

The 2019–20 South Carolina Gamecocks women's basketball team represented the University of South Carolina during the 2019–20 NCAA Division I women's basketball season. The Gamecocks, led by twelfth-year head coach Dawn Staley, played their home games at the Colonial Life Arena and competed as members of the Southeastern Conference, where they won both the regular season and conference tournament championship. Although there was no NCAA Tournament due to COVID-19, The Gamecocks finished the season ranked #1 in both major polls with the best overall record, and are sometimes referred to as the season's "mythical national champions". For her outstanding efforts, Staley swept the national coach of the year awards in 2020, becoming the first person to win the Naismith Award as a player and a coach.

== Previous season ==
The Gamecocks finished the 2018–19 season 23–10, 13–3 in SEC play to finish in second place. They lost in the quarterfinals of the SEC women's tournament to Arkansas. They received an at-large bid to the NCAA women's tournament where they defeated Belmont and Florida State in the first and second rounds before losing to Baylor in the Sweet Sixteen.

== Offseason ==
=== Departures ===
Name	Number	Pos.	Height	Year	Hometown	Notes
Nelly Perry	0	G	5'10"	RS Senior	Camden, NJ	Graduated
Bianca Cuevas-Moore	1	G	5'6"	RS Senior	Bronx, NY	Graduated
Te'a Cooper	2	G	5'8"	RS Junior	Powder Springs, GA	Transferred to Baylor
Doniyah Cliney	4	G	6'0"	Senior	Newark, NJ	Graduated
Bianca Jackson	10	G	5'10"	Sophomore	Montgomery, AL	Transferred to Florida State
LaDazhia Williams	23	C	6'2"	Sophomore	Bradenton, FL	Transferred to Missouri
Alexis Jennings	35	F	6'2"	RS Senior	Laurel, MD	Graduated

=== Incoming transfers ===
Name	Number	Pos.	Height	Year	Hometown	Previous School
Destiny Littleton	11	G	5'9"	RS Sophomore	San Diego, CA	Transferred from Texas. Will sit out a year due to NCAA rules.

=== Recruits ===
The Gamecocks signed the #1 class in the nation for 2019 according to ESPN and Prospects nation.

College recruiting information
Name	Hometown	School	Height	Weight	Commit date
Aliyah Boston #1 P	Worcester, MA	Worcester Academy (MA)	6 ft 4 in (1.93 m)	N/A	Nov 21, 2018
Aliyah Boston #1 P	Recruit ratings: ESPN: (98)				
Zia Cooke #1 PG	Toledo, OH	Rogers	5 ft 9 in (1.75 m)	N/A	Nov 6, 2018
Zia Cooke #1 PG	Recruit ratings: ESPN: (98)				
Laeticia Amihere #2 F	Milton, ON	King's Way Christian	6 ft 3 in (1.91 m)	N/A	Nov 14, 2018
Laeticia Amihere #2 F	Recruit ratings: ESPN: (98)				
Brea Beal #3 W	Rock Island, IL	Rock Island	6 ft 0 in (1.83 m)	N/A	Nov 8, 2018
Brea Beal #3 W	Recruit ratings: ESPN: (98)				
Overall recruit ranking: ESPN: 1
Note: In many cases, Scout, Rivals, 247Sports, On3, and ESPN may conflict in their listings of height and weight.; In these cases, the average was taken. ESPN grades are on a 100-point scale.; Sources: "2019 Player Commits". ESPN. Archived from the original on November 4, 2019.

=== SEC Media Poll ===
SEC media poll
Predicted finish	Team
1	South Carolina
2	Texas A&M
3	Mississippi State
4	Kentucky
5	Arkansas
6	Tennessee
7	Auburn
8	LSU
9	Missouri
10	Georgia
11	Alabama
12	Florida
13	Ole Miss
14	Vanderbilt

== Roster ==
2019–20 South Carolina Gamecocks women's basketball team
Players
Coaches

Pos.	#	Name	Height	Year	Previous school	Hometown
G	0	Olivia Thompson	5 ft 8 in (1.73 m)	Fr	Lexington HS	Lexington, SC
G	1	Zia Cooke	5 ft 9 in (1.75 m)	Fr	Rogers HS	Toledo, OH
G	3	Destanni Henderson	5 ft 7 in (1.7 m)	So	Fort Myers HS	Fort Myers, FL
F	4	Aliyah Boston	6 ft 4 in (1.93 m)	Fr	Worcester (Mass.) Academy	Saint Thomas, VI
F	5	Victaria Saxton	6 ft 2 in (1.88 m)	So	Model	Rome, GA
G	11	Destiny Littleton (redshirt)	5 ft 9 in (1.75 m)	RS So	The Bishop's School; Texas	San Diego, CA
G	12	Brea Beal	6 ft 0 in (1.83 m)	Fr	Rock Island HS	Rock Island, IL
F	15	Laeticia Amihere	6 ft 3 in (1.91 m)	RS Fr	Kings Way Christian	Mississauga, ON
F	21	Mikiah Herbert Harrigan	6 ft 2 in (1.88 m)	Sr	Flanagan HS	Pembroke Pines, FL
G	24	Lele Grissett	6 ft 2 in (1.88 m)	Jr	Hillside HS	Durham, NC
F	32	Elysa Wesolek	6 ft 1 in (1.85 m)	So	Northwood Academy	Charleston, SC
G	52	Tyasha Harris	5 ft 10 in (1.78 m)	Sr	Heritage Christian HS	Noblesville, IN

Head coach

- Dawn Staley (Virginia)

Assistant coach(es)

- Lisa Boyer (Ithaca)
- Fred Chmiel (Alaska–Anchorage)
- Jolette Law (Iowa)

Legend

- (C) Team captain
- (S) Suspended
- (I) Ineligible
- (W) Walk-on
- Injured
- Current redshirt

Roster

== Schedule ==
Date time, TV	Rank^{#}	Opponent^{#}	Result	Record	High points	High rebounds	High assists	Site (attendance) city, state
Exhibition
11/01/2019*; 7:00 pm	No. 8	North Georgia	W 112–48	–	18 – Cooke	8 – Boston	5 – Harris	Colonial Life Arena; Columbia, SC
Regular season
11/05/2019*; 7:00 pm, SECN+	No. 8	Alabama State	W 103–43	1–0	13 – Tied	12 – Boston	4 – Harris	Colonial Life Arena (10,586); Columbia, SC
11/10/2019*; 3:00 pm, ESPN	No. 8	at No. 4 Maryland	W 63–54	2–0	14 – Boston	10 – Beal	4 – Tied	Xfinity Center (7,447); College Park, MD
11/13/2019*; 3:00 pm	No. 6	at Dayton	W 75–49	3–0	27 – Cooke	10 – Beal	7 – Harris	UD Arena (2,331); Dayton, OH
11/17/2019*; 2:00 pm, SECN+	No. 6	Appalachian State	W 92–50	4–0	21 – Herbert Harrigan	10 – Boston	4 – Brea	Colonial Life Arena (10,498); Columbia, SC
11/21/2019*; 7:00 pm, SECN+	No. 5	USC Upstate	W 112–32	5–0	18 – Tied	10 – Boston	6 – Harris	Colonial Life Arena (10,052); Columbia, SC
11/24/2019*; 2:00 pm, ACCN	No. 5	at Clemson; Rivalry	W 84–48	6–0	13 – Herbert Harrigan	9 – Herbert Harrigan	4 – Henderson	Littlejohn Coliseum (2,840); Clemson, SC
11/28/2019*; 8:00 pm	No. 5	vs. No. 17 Indiana; Paradise Jam	L 57–71	6–1	13 – Herbert Harrigan	8 – Herbert Harrigan	5 – Harris	Sports and Fitness Center (1,924); St. Thomas, USVI
11/29/2019*; 8:00 pm	No. 5	vs. Washington State; Paradise Jam	W 68–53	7–1	20 – Herbert Harrigan	8 – Boston	3 – Harris	Sports and Fitness Center (1,806); Saint Thomas, USVI
11/30/2019*; 8:00 pm	No. 5	vs. No. 2 Baylor; Paradise Jam	W 74–59	8–1	20 – Tied	13 – Boston	7 – Harris	Sports and Fitness Center (2,424); Saint Thomas, USVI
12/07/2019*; 3:00 pm	No. 6	at Temple	W 78–71	9–1	21 – Harris	8 – Boston	7 – Harris	McGonigle Hall (1,802); Philadelphia, PA
12/15/2019*; 2:00 pm, SECN+	No. 5	Purdue	W 85–49	10–1	15 – Henderson	9 – Amihere	5 – Harris	Colonial Life Arena (11,306); Columbia, SC
12/19/2019*; 7:00 pm, SECN	No. 5	Duke	W 89–46	11–1	12 – Tied	8 – Tied	3 – Tied	Colonial Life Arena (11,024); Columbia, SC
12/22/2019*; 7:00 pm, SECN+	No. 5	No. 25 South Dakota	W 73–60	12–1	17 – Grissett	9 – Boston	3 – Harris	Colonial Life Arena (10,505); Columbia, SC
01/02/2020; 7:40 pm, SECN	No. 4	No. 13 Kentucky	W 99–72	13–1 (1–0)	15 – Tied	6 – Boston	8 – Henderson	Colonial Life Arena (12,261); Columbia, SC
01/05/2020; 6:00 pm, SECN	No. 4	at Alabama	W 93–78	14–1 (2–0)	20 – Cooke	12 – Boston	7 – Harris	Coleman Coliseum (2,168); Tuscaloosa, AL
01/09/2020; 7:00 pm, SECN+	No. 4	No. 21 Arkansas	W 91–82	15–1 (3–0)	21 – Cooke	25 – Boston	7 – Harris	Colonial Life Arena (10,234); Columbia, SC
01/12/2020; 5:00 pm, SECN	No. 4	at Vanderbilt	W 93–57	16–1 (4–0)	17 – Cooke	8 – Boston	6 – Harris	Memorial Gymnasium (2,447); Nashville, TN
01/16/2020; 8:30 pm, SECN	No. 1	at Missouri	W 78–45	17–1 (5–0)	14 – Tied	13 – Beal	5 – Harris	Mizzou Arena (3,576); Columbia, MO
01/20/2020; 7:00 pm, ESPN2	No. 1	No. 9 Mississippi State	W 81–79	18–1 (6–0)	23 – Harris	12 – Boston	7 – Harris	Colonial Life Arena (13,163); Columbia, SC
01/26/2020; 3:00 pm, SECN	No. 1	at Georgia	W 88–53	19–1 (7–0)	15 – Boston	6 – Tied	7 – Harris	Stegeman Coliseum (6,047); Athens, GA
01/30/2020; 8:00 pm, SECN+	No. 1	at Ole Miss	W 87–32	20–1 (8–0)	16 – Amihere	8 – Boston	3 – Tied	The Pavilion at Ole Miss (1,225); Oxford, MS
02/02/2020; 1:00 pm, ESPN2	No. 1	No. 22 Tennessee	W 69–48	21–1 (9–0)	20 – Cooke	8 – Herbert Harrigan	9 – Harris	Colonial Life Arena (13,735); Columbia, SC
02/06/2020; 8:30 pm, SECN	No. 1	at No. 25 Arkansas	W 86–65	22–1 (10–0)	25 – Herbert Harrigan	15 – Boston	5 – Harris	Bud Walton Arena (2,452); Fayetteville, AR
02/10/2020*; 7:00 pm, ESPN2	No. 1	No. 5 UConn	W 70–52	23–1	19 – Harris	12 – Boston	11 – Harris	Colonial Life Arena (18,000); Columbia, SC
02/13/2020; 7:00 pm, SECN	No. 1	Auburn	W 79–53	24–1 (11–0)	13 – Tied	8 – Saxton	5 – Tied	Colonial Life Arena (11,417); Columbia, SC
02/17/2020; 7:00 pm, SECN	No. 1	Vanderbilt	W 95–44	25–1 (12–0)	14 – Grissett	14 – Boston	6 – Henderson	Colonial Life Arena (11,249); Columbia, SC
02/20/2020; 7:00 pm, SECN+	No. 1	LSU	W 63–48	26–1 (13–0)	13 – Boston	9 – Boston	6 – Harris	Colonial Life Arena (11,242); Columbia, SC
02/23/2020; 2:00 pm, ESPN2	No. 1	at No. 14 Kentucky	W 67–58	27–1 (14–0)	20 – Cooke	11 – Boston	6 – Harris	Memorial Coliseum (7,174); Lexington, KY
02/27/2020; 6:00 pm, SECN+	No. 1	at Florida	W 100–67	28–1 (15–0)	18 – Herbert Harrigan	9 – Tied	8 – Harris	O'Connell Center; Gainesville, FL
03/01/2020; Noon, ESPN2	No. 1	No. 12 Texas A&M	W 60–52	29–1 (16–0)	20 – Herbert Harrigan	12 – Boston	6 – Harris	Colonial Life Arena (18,000); Columbia, SC
SEC Tournament
03/06/2020; Noon, SECN	(1) No. 1	vs. (9) Georgia; Quarterfinals	W 89–56	30–1	16 – Herbert Harrigan	10 – Boston	7 – Henderson	Bon Secours Wellness Arena; Greenville, SC
03/07/2020; 5:00 pm, ESPNU	(1) No. 1	vs. (5) No. 25 Arkansas; Semifinals	W 90–64	31–1	21 – Henderson	13 – Boston	7 – Harris	Bon Secours Wellness Arena; Greenville, SC
03/08/2020; 2:00 pm, ESPN2	(1) No. 1	vs. (2) No. 9 Mississippi State; Championship	W 76–62	32–1	15 – Herbert Harrigan	11 – Tied	10 – Harris	Bon Secours Wellness Arena; Greenville, SC
*Non-conference game. ^{#}Rankings from AP Poll. (#) Tournament seedings in parentheses. All times are in Eastern Time.

Due to the COVID-19 pandemic, the NCAA ended all play on March 12, 2020.

== Rankings ==
Ranking movements Legend: ██ Increase in ranking ██ Decrease in ranking ( ) = First-place votes
	Week																				
Poll	Pre	1	2	3	4	5	6	7	8	9	10	11	12	13	14	15	16	17	18	19	Final
AP	8	8	6	5	5	6	5	5	4 (1)	4 (1)	4 (1)	1 (20)	1 (22)	1 (26)	1 (26)	1 (27)	1 (27)	1 (27)	1 (27)	1 (27)	1 (26)
Coaches	10	10	10^	6	6	7	6	6	5	5	5	2 (12)	2 (12)	2 (12)	2 (13)	1 (17)	1 (20)	1 (20)	1 (23)	1 (27)	1 (26)

^Coaches did not release a Week 2 poll

On December 31, 2020, during the 2020-21 home opener against Florida, the Gamecocks raised a championship banner recognising the mythical national championship claim by polls, located next to the 2017 NCAA championship banner. Following the 2021-22 season with an official NCAA championship, that season's NCAA championship banner was placed next to the 2019-20 banner, and is the same size as the official banners.
