= 2019–20 Mississippi State Bulldogs women's basketball team =

Intercollegiate basketball season

2019–20 Mississippi State Bulldogs women's basketball
- Conference: Southeastern Conference

Ranking
- Coaches: No. 9
- AP: No. 9
- Record: 27–6 (13–3 SEC)
- Head coach: Vic Schaefer (8th season)
- Associate head coach: Dionnah Jackson-Durrett
- Assistant coaches: Johnnie Harris; Elena Lovato
- Home arena: Humphrey Coliseum

2019–20 SEC women's basketball standings
	Conf.				Overall
Team	W		L	PCT	W		L	PCT
No. 1 South Carolina †	16	–	0	1.000	32	–	1	.970
No. 9 Mississippi State	13	–	3	.813	27	–	6	.818
No. 24 Arkansas	10	–	6	.625	24	–	8	.750
No. 16 Kentucky	10	–	6	.625	22	–	8	.733
No. 19 Texas A&M	10	–	6	.625	22	–	8	.733
Tennessee	10	–	6	.625	21	–	10	.677
LSU	9	–	7	.563	20	–	10	.667
Alabama	8	–	8	.500	18	–	12	.600
Georgia	7	–	9	.438	17	–	14	.548
Florida	6	–	10	.375	15	–	15	.500
Missouri	5	–	11	.313	9	–	22	.290
Vanderbilt	4	–	12	.250	14	–	16	.467
Auburn	4	–	12	.250	11	–	18	.379
Ole Miss	0	–	16	.000	7	–	23	.233
† 2020 SEC tournament winner Rankings from AP poll

The 2019–20 Mississippi State Bulldogs women's basketball team represented Mississippi State University during the 2019–20 NCAA Division I women's basketball season. The Bulldogs, led by eighth-year head coach Vic Schaefer, played their home games at Humphrey Coliseum as members of the Southeastern Conference (SEC).

The Bulldogs are coming off a 2019 NCAA Elite Eight loss to Oregon in which they lost 84–88.

At the conclusion of the season, Schaefer resigned to take the open coaching position at Texas.

== Preseason ==
=== SEC media poll ===
The SEC media poll was released on October 15, 2019.

Media poll
Predicted finish	Team
1	South Carolina
2	Texas A&M
3	Mississippi State
4	Kentucky
5	Arkansas
6	Tennessee
7	Auburn
8	LSU
9	Missouri
10	Georgia
11	Alabama
12	Florida
13	Ole Miss
14	Vanderbilt

== Roster ==
2019–20 Mississippi State Bulldogs women's basketball team
Players
Coaches

Pos.	#	Name	Height	Year	Previous school	Hometown
G	00	Jayla Hemingway	5 ft 11 in (1.8 m)	Fr	Houston HS	Collierville, TN
G	1	Myah Taylor	5 ft 7 in (1.7 m)	RS So	Olive Branch HS	Olive Branch, MS
G	2	Andra Espinoza-Hunter	5 ft 11 in (1.8 m)	Jr	Ossining HS; UConn	Ossining, NY
G	3	Aliyah Matharu	5 ft 7 in (1.7 m)	Fr	Bishop McNamara HS	Washington, D.C.
F/C	4	Jessika Carter	6 ft 5 in (1.96 m)	So	Harris County HS	Waverly Hall, GA
F	5	Rickea Jackson	6 ft 2 in (1.88 m)	Fr	Detroit Edison Public School Academy	Detroit, MI
G	10	JaMya Mingo-Young	5 ft 8 in (1.73 m)	Fr	Loranger HS	Bogalusa, LA
G	11	Xaria Wiggins	6 ft 1 in (1.85 m)	So	Princess Anne HS	Virginia Beach, VA
C	13	Promise Taylor (redshirt)	6 ft 5 in (1.96 m)	So	Sammamish HS; Ole Miss	Issaquah, WA
F/C	14	Sidney Cooks	6 ft 4 in (1.93 m)	Jr	St. Joseph Catholic Academy; Michigan State	Kenosha, WI
C	20	Yemiyah Morris	5 ft 6 in (1.68 m)	Jr	Canyon Springs HS; Cochise College	San Bernardino, CA
G	23	Bre'Amber Scott	5 ft 11 in (1.8 m)	Jr	Central HS	Little Rock, AR
G	24	Jordan Danberry	5 ft 8 in (1.73 m)	Sr	Conway HS; Arkansas	Conway, AR
F	55	Chloe Bibby	6 ft 1 in (1.85 m)	Jr	Rowville Secondary	Warracknabeal, Vic, Australia

Head coach

- Vic Schaefer (Texas A&M)

Assistant coach(es)

- Dionnah Jackson-Durrett (Oklahoma)
- Johnnie Harris (Arkansas Baptist)
- Elena Lovato (Pittsburg State)

Legend

- (C) Team captain
- (S) Suspended
- (I) Ineligible
- (W) Walk-on
- Injured
- Current redshirt

Roster
Last update: September 20, 2019

== Rankings ==
Ranking movements Legend: ██ Increase in ranking ██ Decrease in ranking
	Week																				
Poll	Pre	1	2	3	4	5	6	7	8	9	10	11	12	13	14	15	16	17	18	19	Final
AP	10	10	10	10	10	10	15	15	15												
Coaches	8	8	8	8	8	8	14														

^Coaches' Poll did not release a second poll at the same time as the AP.

== Schedule ==
Date time, TV	Rank^{#}	Opponent^{#}	Result	Record	High points	High rebounds	High assists	Site (attendance) city, state
Exhibition
11/04/2019*; 7:00 pm, SECN+	No. 10	Lubbock Christian	W 78–57		27 – Carter	13 – Carter	8 – M. Taylor	Humphrey Coliseum (1,847); Starkville, MS
Non-conference regular season
11/09/2019*; 2:00 pm, SECN+	No. 10	Southern Miss	W 91–58	1–0	16 – Bibby	9 – Carter	5 – M. Taylor	Humphrey Coliseum (7,591); Starkville, MS
11/11/2019*; 7:00 pm, SECN+	No. 10	UT Martin	W 82–46	2–0	19 – Carter	8 – Carter	5 – M. Taylor	Humphrey Coliseum (7,667); Starkville, MS
11/15/2019*; 7:00 pm, SECN+	No. 10	Murray State	W 124–43	3–0	25 – Carter	18 – Carter	5 – Danberry	Humphrey Coliseum (7,820); Starkville, MS
11/18/2019*; 7:00 pm, SECN+	No. 10	Troy	W 122–82	4–0	24 – Danberry	14 – Carter	7 – M. Taylor	Humphrey Coliseum (6,839); Starkville, MS
11/21/2019*; 7:00 pm	No. 10	at Jackson State	W 92–53	5–0	21 – Carter	15 – Bibby	5 – M. Taylor	Williams Assembly Center (2,305); Jackson, MS
11/25/2019*; 7:00 pm	No. 10	at Marquette	W 74–68	6–0	20 – Danberry	23 – Carter	4 – Tied	Al McGuire Center (2,325); Milwaukee, WI
11/28/2019*; 3:30 pm	No. 10	vs. San Francisco; Greater Victoria Invitational	W 73–38	7–0	17 – Danberry	6 – Carter	3 – M. Taylor	CARSA Performance Gym (723); Greater Victoria, BC
11/29/2019*; 7:00 pm	No. 10	vs. Green Bay; Greater Victoria Invitational	W 83–58	8–0	21 – Danberry	12 – Carter	4 – M. Taylor	CARSA Performance Gym (943); Greater Victoria, BC
11/30/2019*; 9:30 pm	No. 10	vs. No. 3 Stanford; Greater Victoria Invitational	L 62–67	8–1	15 – Jackson	6 – Carter	4 – Mingo-Young	CARSA Performance Gym; Greater Victoria, BC
12/8/2019*; 1:00 pm, SECN	No. 10	West Virginia; Big 12/SEC Women's Challenge	L 65–71	8–2	19 – Danberry	9 – Jackson	6 – M. Taylor	Humphrey Coliseum (7,113); Starkville, MS
12/16/2019*; 11:00 am	No. 15	at Louisiana	W 64–48	9–2	12 – Tied	12 – Bibby	6 – M. Taylor	Cajundome; Lafayette, LA
12/19/2019*; 6:00 pm	No. 15	vs. South Florida; Duel in the Desert	W 86–61	10–2	21 – Bibby	10 – Jackson	5 – Danberry	Cox Pavilion; Paradise, NV
12/21/2019*; 2:00/4:30 pm	No. 15	vs. Virginia; Duel in the Desert	W 72–59	11–2	17 – Jackson	15 – Carter	8 – M. Taylor	Cox Pavilion (850); Paradise, NV
12/29/2019*; 2:00 pm, SECN+	No. 15	Little Rock	W 89–50	12–2	18 – Matharu	14 – Carter	3 – Danberry	Humphrey Coliseum; Starkville, MS
SEC regular season
01/02/2020; 7:10 pm, SECN+	No. 15	Florida	W 93–47	13–2 (1–0)	21 – Danberry	10 – Bibby	8 – Danberry	Humphrey Coliseum (7,427); Starkville, MS
01/05/2020; 3:00 pm, SECN	No. 15	at Georgia	W 73–66	14–2 (2–0)	17 – Tied	8 – Bibby	4 – M. Taylor	Stegeman Coliseum (3,006); Athens, GA
01/09/2020; 6:00 pm, SECN	No. 13	at Missouri	W 79–64	15–2 (3–0)	21 – Jackson	9 – Jackson	3 – Danberry	Mizzou Arena (3,920); Columbia, MO
01/16/2020; 7:00 pm, SECN+	No. 10	LSU	W 64–60	16–2 (4–0)	16 – Danberry	11 – Carter	4 – M. Taylor	Humphrey Coliseum (7,846); Starkville, MS
01/20/2020; 6:00 pm, ESPN2	No. 9	at No. 1 South Carolina	L 79–81	16–3 (4–1)	16 – Tied	9 – Bibby	4 – M. Taylor	Colonial Life Arena (13,163); Columbia, SC
01/23/2020; 8:00 pm, SECN	No. 9	at Vanderbilt	W 68–52	17–3 (5–1)	22 – Carter	7 – Carter	5 – Danberry	Memorial Gymnasium (2,157); Nashville, TN
01/26/2020; 4:00 pm, SECN	No. 9	Ole Miss	W 80–39	18–3 (6–1)	24 – Carter	11 – Carter	8 – Danberry	Humphrey Coliseum (9,503); Starkville, MS
01/30/2020; 7:00 pm, SECN+	No. 9	Auburn	W 78–73	19–3 (7–1)	22 – Jackson	6 – Danberry	5 – Danberry	Humphrey Coliseum (7,249); Starkville, MS
02/03/2020; 6:00 pm, SECN	No. 8	Georgia	W 67–53	20–3 (8–1)	24 – Jackson	11 – Carter	5 – Danberry	Humphrey Coliseum (6,848); Starkville, MS
02/06/2020; 5:30 pm, SECN	No. 8	at No. 23 Tennessee	W 72–55	21–3 (9–1)	14 – Jackson	9 – Jackson	5 – M. Taylor	Thompson–Boling Arena (8,124); Knoxville, TN
02/09/2020; 12:00 pm, ESPN	No. 8	No. 16 Texas A&M	W 69–57	22–3 (10–1)	21 – Jackson	10 – Jackson	6 – M. Taylor	Humphrey Coliseum (8,400); Starkville, MS
02/16/2020; 4:00 pm, ESPN2	No. 6	at No. 18 Kentucky	L 62–73	22–4 (10–2)	18 – Carter	7 – Jackson	9 – M. Taylor	Memorial Coliseum (5,317); Lexington, KY
02/20/2020; 8:00 pm, SECN	No. 9	at Auburn	W 92–85 ^{OT}	23–4 (11–2)	34 – Jackson	10 – Carter	6 – M. Taylor	Auburn Arena (1,656); Auburn, AL
02/23/2020; 1:00 pm, ESPN2/SECN	No. 9	Alabama	L 64–66	23–5 (11–3)	18 – Carter	12 – Carter	6 – M. Taylor	Humphrey Coliseum (8,083); Starkville, MS
02/27/2020; 8:00 pm, SECN	No. 10	Arkansas	W 92–83	24–5 (12–3)	21 – Carter	11 – Carter	7 – M. Taylor	Humphrey Coliseum (7,256); Starkville, MS
03/01/2020; 1:40 pm, SECN+	No. 10	at Ole Miss	W 84–59	25–5 (13–3)	24 – Matharu	7 – Danberry	10 – M. Taylor	The Pavilion at Ole Miss (2,974); Oxford, MS
SEC Tournament
03/06/2020; 5:00 pm, SECN	(2) No. 9	vs. (7) LSU; Quarterfinals	W 79–49	26–5	23 – Jackson	10 – Jackson	8 – M. Taylor	Bon Secours Wellness Arena (5,749); Greenville, SC
03/07/2020; 6:30 pm, ESPNU	(2) No. 9	vs. (3) No. 16 Kentucky; Semifinals	W 77–59	27–5	29 – Jackson	10 – Tied	7 – Danberry	Bon Secours Wellness Arena; Greenville, SC
03/08/2020; 1:00 pm, ESPN2	(2) No. 9	vs. (1) No. 1 South Carolina; Championship	L 62–76	27–6	17 – Matharu	8 – Carter	4 – Danberry	Bon Secours Wellness Arena; Greenville, SC
*Non-conference game. ^{#}Rankings from AP Poll. (#) Tournament seedings in parentheses. All times are in Central Time.
