= Jefferson Christian Academy =

Coordinates: 37.3287°N 80.6701°W

Jefferson Christian Academy is a private K–12 Baptist school in Ripplemead, Giles County, Virginia. Founded in 1994, the school has an enrollment of about 121 students.
