= Ole Miss Rebels women's basketball =

2026–27 Ole Miss Rebels women's basketball team
- University: University of Mississippi
- First season: 1981 (44 years ago)
- Head coach: Yolett McPhee-McCuin (9th season)
- Location: University, Mississippi
- Arena: The Sandy and John Black Pavilion at Ole Miss (capacity: 9,500)
- Conference: SEC
- Nickname: Rebels
- Colors: Cardinal red and navy blue
- All-time record: 817–551 (.597)

NCAA Division I tournament Elite Eight
- 1985, 1986, 1989, 1992, 2007
Other NCAA Division I tournament results
Sweet Sixteen	1983, 1984, 1985, 1986, 1987, 1988, 1989, 1990, 1992, 2007, 2023, 2025
Appearances	1982, 1983, 1984, 1985, 1986, 1987, 1988, 1989, 1990, 1991, 1992, 1994, 1995, 1996, 2004, 2005, 2007, 2022, 2023, 2024, 2025, 2026

AIAW tournament appearances
- 1978

Conference regular-season champions
- 1992

Uniforms
Home	Away
Alternate	Alternate

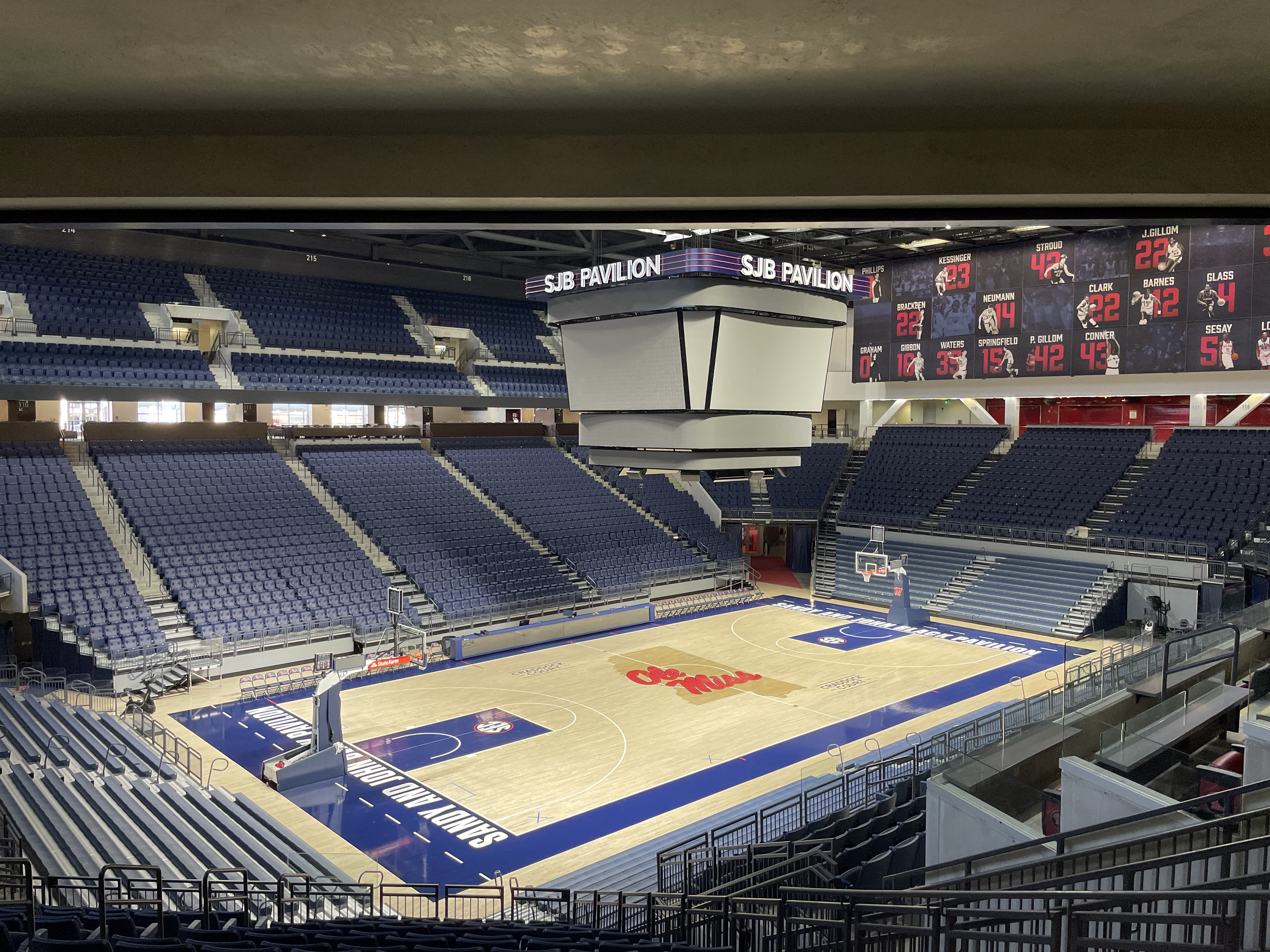
The Ole Miss Basketball Court inside the Pavilion.

The Ole Miss Rebels women's basketball team represents the University of Mississippi in women's basketball. The school competes in the Southeastern Conference (SEC) in Division I of the National Collegiate Athletic Association (NCAA). The Rebels play home basketball games at The Pavilion at Ole Miss near the campus in University, Mississippi.

== Roster ==
2025–26 Ole Miss Rebels women's basketball team
Players
Coaches

Pos.	#	Name	Height	Year	Previous school	Hometown
G	2	Lauren Jacobs	5 ft 9 in (1.75 m)	So	Heathwood Hall	Columbia, SC (United States) (South Carolina)
G	4	Knisha Godfrey	5 ft 9 in (1.75 m)	Sr	Florida	Columbus, OH (United States) (Ohio)
G/F	5	Maya Anderson	6 ft 1 in (1.85 m)	Jr	San Jose State	Toronto (Canada) (Ontario)
C	7	Desrae Kyles	6 ft 5 in (1.96 m)	Jr	Central Michigan	Benton Harbor, MI (United States) (Michigan)
G	12	Charleen Hudson	5 ft 6 in (1.68 m)	Fr	Springdale	Springdale, AR (United States) (Arkansas)
G	15	Jaida Civil	6 ft 0 in (1.83 m)	So	Tennessee	Vero Beach, FL (United States) (Florida)
C	20	Emily Howard	6 ft 5 in (1.96 m)	Sr	Boise State	Vancouver (Canada) (British Columbia)
F	22	Doneelah Washington	6 ft 1 in (1.85 m)	Jr	Illinois State	Lincoln, NE (United States) (Nebraska)
F	24	Jade Tillman	6 ft 1 in (1.85 m)	Sr	UMBC	Rockville, MD (United States) (Maryland)
F	25	Rachael Okokoh	6 ft 4 in (1.93 m)	So	Penn State	Montreal (Canada) (Quebec)
G	30	Jada Richard	5 ft 7 in (1.7 m)	Jr	LSU	Opelousas, LA (United States) (Louisiana)
G	55	Talaysia Cooper	6 ft 0 in (1.83 m)	Sr	Tennessee	Turbeville, SC (United States) (South Carolina)

Head coach

- Yolett McPhee-McCuin (Rhode Island)

Assistant coach(es)

- Quentin Hillsman (St. Mary's (MD))
- Joy Smith (Duke)
- Jacob Whitehead (SIU Edwardsville)

Legend

- (C) Team captain
- (S) Suspended
- (I) Ineligible
- (W) Walk-on
- Injured
- Current redshirt

Roster

== Rebels in the WNBA draft ==
Rebels in the WNBA
Year	Round	Pick	Player	Team
1997	IPA	12	Jennifer Gillom	Phoenix Mercury
1999	ED	6	Yolanda Moore	Orlando Miracle
2002	3	39	Saundra Jackson	Orlando Miracle
2007	1	3	Armintie Price	Chicago Sky
2010	1	12	Bianca Thomas	Los Angeles Sparks
2022	1	3	Shakira Austin	Washington Mystics
2024	1	11	Marquesha Davis	New York Liberty
2025	2	14	Madison Scott	Dallas Wings
2026	1	11	Cotie McMahon	Washington Mystics
2026	2	21	Latasha Lattimore	Chicago Sky

=== Rebels in international leagues ===
- Shakira Austin (born 2000), center for the Israeli Elitzur Ramla
- Angel Baker (born 2000), guard for the Polish Ślęza Wrocław

== Postseason results ==
=== NCAA Division I ===
The Rebels have appeared in the NCAA Division I women's basketball tournament 22 times. Their combined record is 24–22.

Year	Seed	Round	Opponent	Result
1982	No. 6	First Round	No. 3 Memphis State	L 70–72
1983	No. 4	First Round; Second Round	No. 5 Florida State; No. 1 Tennessee	W 86–76; L 83–90^{3OT}
1984	No. 4	First Round; Second Round	No. 5 Ohio State; No. 1 Georgia	W 77–55; L 63–73
1985	No. 2	First Round; Second Round; Regional Final	No. 7 Southern Miss; No. 3 Tennessee; No. 4 Western Kentucky	W 81–68; W 63–60; L 68–72
1986	No. 2	First Round; Second Round; Regional Final	No. 10 Drake; No. 3 Auburn; No. 1 Texas	W 84–71; W 56–55; L 63–66
1987	No. 4	First Round; Second Round	No. 5 Penn State; No. 1 Long Beach State	W 80–75; L 55–94
1988	No. 3	First Round; Second Round	No. 6 Houston; No. 2 Louisiana Tech	W 74–68; L 60–80
1989	No. 3	First Round; Second Round; Regional Final	No. 6 Old Dominion; No. 2 NC State; No. 1 Auburn	W 74–58; W 68–63; L 51–77
1990	No. 5	First Round; Second Round; Sweet Sixteen	No. 12 Utah; No. 4 UNLV; No. 1 Stanford	W 74–51; W 66–62; L 65–78
1991	No. 9	First Round	No. 8 Stephen F. Austin	L 62–73
1992	No. 2	First Round; Second Round; Sweet Sixteen	No. 10 Southern Illinois; No. 3 Penn State; No. 8 Southwest Missouri State	W 72–56; W 75–72; L 71–94
1994	No. 5	First Round; Second Round	No. 12 Indiana; No. 4 Louisiana Tech	W 83–61; L 67–82
1995	No. 12	First Round	No. 5 Drake	L 81–87
1996	No. 7	First Round	No. 10 Toledo	L 53–65
2004	No. 10	First Round	No. 7 Villanova	L 63–66
2005	No. 8	First Round	No. 9 George Washington	L 57–60
2007	No. 7	First Round; Second Round; Sweet Sixteen; Elite Eight	No. 10 TCU; No. 2 Maryland; No. 3 Oklahoma; No. 1 Tennessee	W 88–74; W 89–78; W 90–82; L 62–98
2022	No. 7	First Round	No. 10 South Dakota	L 61–75
2023	No. 8	First Round; Second Round; Sweet Sixteen	No. 9 Gonzaga; No. 1 Stanford; No. 5 Louisville	W 71–48; W 54–49; L 62–72
2024	No. 7	First Round; Second Round	No. 10 Marquette; No. 2 Notre Dame	W 67–55; L 56–71
2025	No. 5	First Round; Second Round; Sweet Sixteen	No. 12 Ball State; No. 4 Baylor; No. 1 UCLA	W 83–65; W 69–63; L 62–76
2026	No. 5	First Round; Second Round	No. 12 Gonzaga; No. 4 Minnesota	W 81–66; L 63–65

=== WNIT results ===
The Rebels have appeared in the Women's National Invitation Tournament 8 times. Their combined record is 8–8.

Year	Round	Opponent	Result
1999	First Round	at UT Martin	L 66–77
2001	First Round	at Western Kentucky	L 92–95
2006	Second Round; Third Round	at Kansas at Pittsburgh	W 78–76; L 76–85
2009	Second Round; Third Round	Murray State at South Florida	W 87–49; L 57–74
2010	First Round	at Samford	L 65–66
2015	First Round; Second Round; Third Round	UT Martin; Georgia Tech at Middle Tennessee	W 80–70; W 63–48; L 70–82
2017	First Round	Grambling State	L 75–78
2021	First Round; Second Round; Quarterfinals; Semifinals; Championship Game	vs. Samford vs. Tulane vs. Colorado vs. Northern Iowa vs. Rice	W 64–45; W 72–61; W 65–56; W 60–50; L 58–71

=== AIAW Division I ===
The Rebels made one appearance in the AIAW National Division I basketball tournament, with a combined record of 0–1.

Year	Round	Opponent	Result
1978	First Round	Queens (NY)	L, 71–74

== Season-by-season record ==
The Rebels started play on December 3, 1974, playing Itawamba Junior College, losing 76–75. They won their first ever game the next day over Blue Mountain 85–56. They reached their first national tournament in 1978, though they lost to Queens College 74–71. They were invited to their first NCAA Tournament in 1982. From 1984 to 2007, the Rebels reached the Elite Eight five times, four happening under Van Chancellor. Ole Miss has won just one conference title, winning the regular season title in 1992, though they fell in the SEC Tournament Semifinals.

On January 30, 2020, Ole Miss tied the record for least points scored in a half with 2 during a home game against South Carolina.

Season	Coach	Record	Conference Record	Postseason Finish
1974–75	Pam Davidson	14–8	Not Applicable	AIAW State Tournament
1975–76	Pam Davidson	19–8	Not Applicable	AIAW State Tournament (3rd place); AIAW Region III Tournament
1976–77	Pam Davidson	20–8	Not Applicable	AIAW State Tournament (3rd place)
1977–78	Lin Dunn	25–15	Not Applicable	AIAW State Tournament Champion; AIAW Region III Runner-up; AIAW Top 12
1978–79	Van Chancellor	31–9	Not Applicable	AIAW State Tournament Champion; AIAW Region III Tournament (3rd place)
1979–80	Van Chancellor	23–14	Not Applicable	AIAW State Tournament (3rd place)
1980–81	Van Chancellor	14–12	Not Applicable	AIAW State Tournament
1981–82	Van Chancellor	27–5	7–1 (1st)	NCAA First Round
1982–83	Van Chancellor	26–6	6–2 (T-1st)	NCAA Second Round
1983–84	Van Chancellor	24–6	6–2 (1st)	NCAA Second Round
1984–85	Van Chancellor	29–3	8–0 (1st)	NCAA Elite Eight
1985–86	Van Chancellor	24–8	6–3 (T-2nd)	NCAA Elite Eight
1986–87	Van Chancellor	25–5	7–2 (T-2nd)	NCAA Sweet 16
1987–88	Van Chancellor	24–7	5–4 (T-4th)	NCAA Sweet 16
1988–89	Van Chancellor	23–8	4–5 (6th)	NCAA Elite Eight
1989–90	Van Chancellor	22–10	7–2 (T-2nd)	NCAA Sweet 16
1990–91	Van Chancellor	20–9	5–6 (T-5th)	NCAA First Round
1991–92	Van Chancellor	29–3	11–0 (1st)	NCAA Elite Eight
1992–93	Van Chancellor	19–10	4–7 (T-8th)	None
1993–94	Van Chancellor	24–9	7–4 (T-4th)	NCAA Second Round
1994–95	Van Chancellor	21–8	6–5 (7th)	NCAA First Round
1995–96	Van Chancellor	18–11	6–5 (T-5th)	NCAA First Round
1996–97	Van Chancellor	16–11	5–7 (T-7th)	None
1997–98	Ron Aldy	12–19	3–11 (T-11th)	None
1998–99	Ron Aldy	15–13	6–8 (T-8th)	WNIT First Round
1999–00	Ron Aldy	12–16	1–13 (12th)	None
2000–01	Ron Aldy	17–13	4–10 (T-10th)	WNIT First Round
2001–02	Ron Aldy	11–17	3–11 (T-10th)	None
2002–03	Ron Aldy	12–16	1–13 (T-11th)	None
2003–04	Carol Ross	17–14	7–7 (7th)	NCAA first round
2004–05	Carol Ross	19–11	8–6 (5th)	NCAA first round
2005–06	Carol Ross	17–14	5–9 (8th)	WNIT Second Round
2006–07	Carol Ross	24–11	9–5 (5th)	NCAA Elite Eight
2007–08	Renee Ladner	13–16	6–8 (8th)	None
2008–09	Renee Ladner	18–15	5–9 (9th)	WNIT Third Round
2009–10	Renee Ladner	17–15	7–9 (T-7th)	WNIT First Round
2010–11	Renee Ladner	10–19	3–13 (12th)	None
2011–12	Renee Ladner	12–18	2–12 (12th)	None
2012–13	Brett Frank	9–20	2–14 (14th)	None (Self-imposed postseason ban)
2013–14	Matt Insell	12–20	2–14 (14th)	None
2014–15	Matt Insell	19–14	7–9 (T-7th)	WNIT Third Round
2015–16	Matt Insell	10–20	2–14 (14th)	None
2016–17	Matt Insell	17–14	6–10 (10th)	WNIT First Round
2017–18	Matt Insell	12–19	1–15 (14th)	None
2018–19	Yolett McPhee-McCuin	9–22	3–13 (T-12th)	None
2019–20	Yolett McPhee-McCuin	7–23	0–16 (14th)	None
2020–21	Yolett McPhee-McCuin	15–12	4–10 (11th)	WNIT Runner-up
2021-22	Yolett McPhee-McCuin	23-7	10-6 (4th)	NCAA First Round
2022-23	Yolett McPhee-McCuin	25-9	11-5 (4th)	NCAA Sweet Sixteen
2023-24	Yolett McPhee-McCuin	24-9	12-4 (3rd)	NCAA Second Round
2024-25	Yolett McPhee-McCuin	22-11	10-6 (T–6th)	NCAA Sweet Sixteen
2025-26	Yolett McPhee-McCuin	24-12	8-8 (T–6th)	NCAA Second Round
