= Heathwood Hall Episcopal School =

Prep school in Columbia, South Carolina, US

Heathwood Hall

Location
- 3000 South Beltline Boulevard; Columbia, South Carolina 29201; United States; 33°57′02.83″N 81°00′53.01″W

Information
- Type: Private
- Religious affiliation: Episcopal
- Established: 1951 (75 years ago)
- Campus: 133 acres (54 ha)
- Colors: Navy blue and green
- Athletics: 41 Interscholastic Teams
- Mascot: Highlander
- Website: www.heathwood.org

Heathwood Hall Episcopal School is an independent coeducational college preparatory school in Columbia, South Carolina, enclaved within the city of Cayce. Founded in 1951, Heathwood offers classes for students in pre-kindergarten/nursery school through grade 12.

== History ==
Heathwood was chartered in 1951 by the Episcopal Diocese of Upper South Carolina.

The school admitted its first black students in 1965.

The school remained on its downtown campus until 1974.

In 2017, the school refused a parent access to the campus for flying the Confederate flag on his truck. The man withdrew his two children from the school.

== Notable alumni ==
- Monique Coleman – Actress in High School Musical
- A'ja Wilson – WNBA player, 5x WNBA M’VP, and 2x Olympic Gold Medalist
