= Caitlin Clark Foundation =

Non-profit founded in Des Moines

Caitlin Clark Foundation Inc.
- Founded: October 2023; 2 years ago
- Founder: Caitlin Clark
- Tax ID no.: 93-2840468
- Legal status: 501(c)(3) Non-profit
- Headquarters: West Des Moines, Iowa, U.S.
- Fields: Education, nutrition, and sport
- President: Mary Coffin
- Director: Anne Nizzi
- Treasurer: Blake Clark
- Website: Official website

The Caitlin Clark Foundation is a US non-profit organization founded in 2023 by American professional basketball player, Caitlin Clark, with a mission "to uplift and improve the lives of youth and their communities through education, nutrition, and sport."

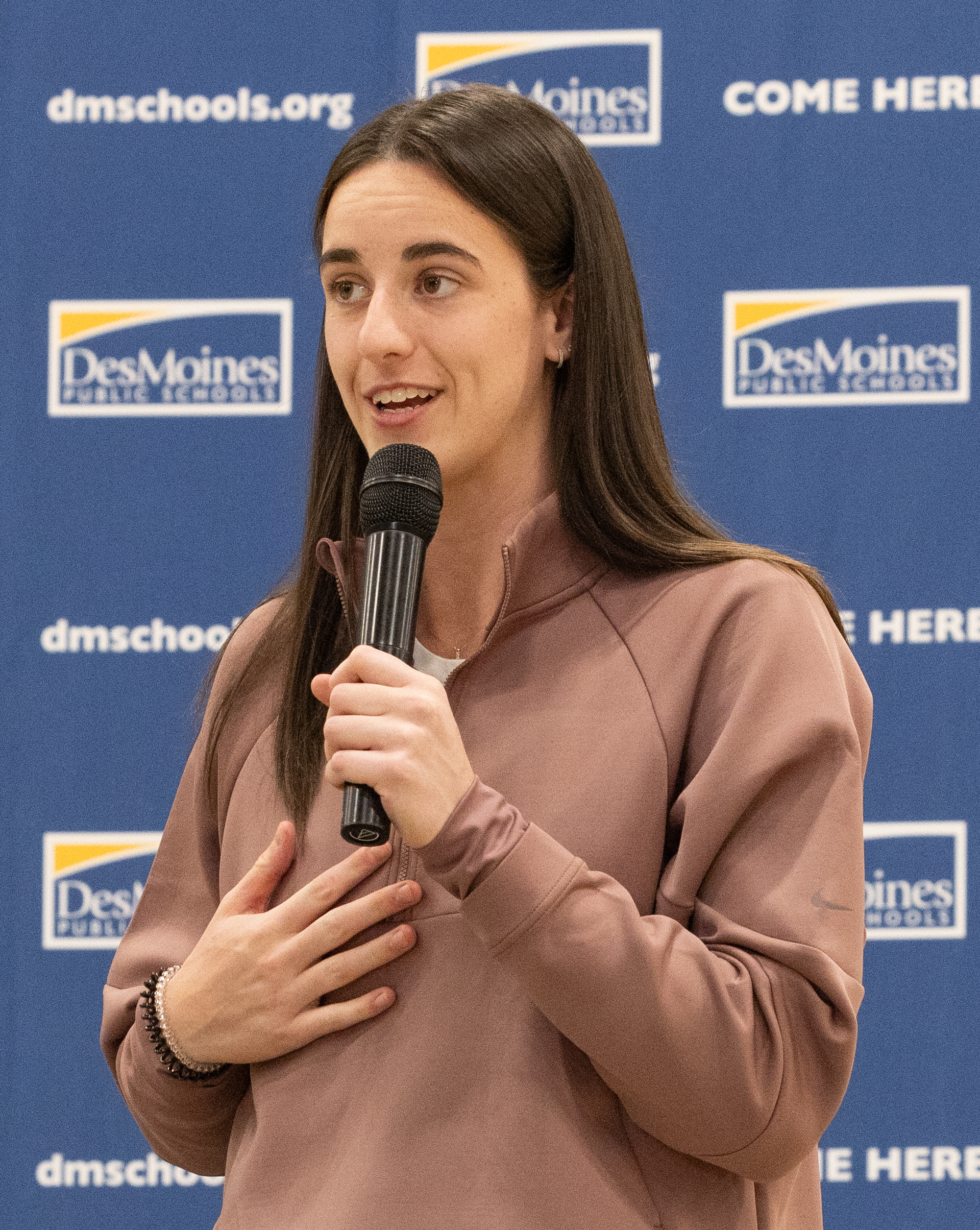
Clark speaking at an event for the Caitlin Clark Foundation in August 2024

== Fundraising ==
Many of Clark's sponsorship and endorsement deals include pledges of support, monetary donations, and/or product donations to the Caitlin Clark Foundation. As part of Clark's multi-year deal with Gatorade, the company donated $22,000 to the foundation, a nod to her jersey number and birthday, in late 2023. With the release of Clark's limited-edition capsule collection in March 2024, Gatorade made $25,000 donations to both the Caitlin Clark Foundation and the Women's Sports Foundation to help increase girls' access to the sport of basketball. In January 2024, State Farm announced its intention to donate $22,000 to the foundation in honor of Clark's golden birthday. Hy-Vee donated $35,690 to Clark's foundation in honor of Clark surpassing 3,569 career points at Iowa and becoming the new scoring leader in NCAA Division I women's basketball history in February 2024. With the announcement of Clark's partnership with Wilson Sporting Goods in May 2024, Wilson also announced its commitment to support the Caitlin Clark Foundation and its mission. In November 2024, during an event at The ANNIKA, Group 1001 presented Clark with a grant of $22,000 to her foundation. The foundation received another $22,000 grant from the Gainbridge Assists Powered by Parity grant program in September 2025.

== Business model ==
Since its formation, the organization awards grants and provides donations to local foundations and charities in Iowa and throughout the Midwest. The Community Foundation of Greater Des Moines is partnered with the Caitlin Clark Foundation "for donation processing and administration."

Previous beneficiaries from the foundation include The Boys & Girls Clubs of Central Iowa and the Coralville Community Food Pantry. In January 2025, ahead of Clark's jersey retirement ceremony at the University of Iowa, the Caitlin Clark Foundation announced four $22,000 grants had been awarded to four Iowa charities with close ties to Clark herself.The recipients of these grants were the University of Iowa Children's Hospital, the Coralville Community Food Pantry, the Boys & Girls Club of the Corridor, and the Special Olympics Iowa–East Central.

== Work ==
The Caitlin Clark Foundation focuses its work through three pillars that Clark considers to have been pivotal to her success and accomplishments: education, nutrition, and sport.

Education

During the WNBA's Olympic break in August 2024, the Caitlin Clark Foundation hosted and sponsored a back to school event at North High School in Des Moines, Iowa. During the event, Clark made a surprise appearance and helped hand out Nike backpacks filled with school supplies, as well as a Gatorade water bottle (provided by Hy-Vee and PepsiCo, respectively) to about 350 high school students.

In January 2025 on Clark's 23rd birthday, the Caitlin Clark Foundation teamed up with Scholastic and their national literacy program, United States of Readers. Additionally, the foundation announced its intention to donate 22,000 books to under-resourced elementary and middle schools in both Iowa and Indiana through the United States of Readers program.

In July 2025, Clark and the foundation hosted two back to school events at Northwest Middle School in Indianapolis, Indiana and McCombs Middle School in Des Moines, Iowa. In partnership with Scholastic and Eli Lilly and Company, hundreds of students (from Indianapolis Public Schools, Des Moines Public Schools, and Diocese of Des Moines schools) received new backpacks, books, and school supplies from the foundation prior to the start of the 2025–26 school year.

Nutrition

After Clark partnered with the Coralville Community Food Pantry in Coralville, Iowa in 2022 and 2023, the foundation has continued to provide donations and grants to the local food pantry. As of 2024, Clark helped raise over $100,000 for Coralville Community Food Pantry, and the nonprofit continues to frequently receive $22 donations in her honor.'

In January 2024, Hy-Vee released a limited edition cereal called "Caitlin's Crunch Time" in select stores in Iowa with all proceeds benefiting the Caitlin Clark Foundation. In May 2025, Hy-Vee announced the cereal would be re-released, for a limited time, across the Midwest with all proceeds from sales again going to the foundation. In March 2025, the foundation teamed up with Hy-Vee to raise funds to support childhood nutrition for local food banks across the Midwest via a month-long donation drive. Customers at Hy-Vee grocery stores were given the option to "round up their purchases to the nearest dollar" with those monies directly going to local Feeding America food banks via the Caitlin Clark Foundation. In May 2025, the foundation presented a $300,802 donation to Feeding America at the Food Bank of Iowa from their round-up campaign. At that time, the donation was estimated to provide about 3 million meals to food insecure communities in the Midwest via eighteen Feeding America partner food banks.

Sport

In November 2023 at the Boys & Girls Clubs of Central Iowa’s 60th Anniversary Gala, the Caitlin Clark Foundation made a surprise $22,000 monetary donation as well as a donation of sports equipment and winter clothing totaling over $13,000 in value.

In March 2025, the foundation began a partnership with Musco and introduced the foundation's new "Community Courts Initiative". The foundation announced plans for new Musco Mini-Pitch Systems, multipurpose recreation courts made for sports like soccer, futsal, and basketball, to be installed in four middle schools within the Des Moines Public Schools (DMPS) district. In May 2025, the first Caitlin Clark Foundation Community Court opened at Weeks Middle School in Des Moines, Iowa. Clark attended the ribbon cutting of her second Community Court at McCombs Middle School in July 2025.
