= Caitlin Clark =

American basketball player (born 2002)

- Clark with the United States in 2026

No. 22 – Indiana Fever
- Position: Point guard
- League: WNBA

Personal information
- Born: January 22, 2002 (age 24) Des Moines, Iowa, U.S.
- Listed height: 6 ft 0 in (1.83 m)
- Listed weight: 157 lb (71 kg)

Career information
- High school: Dowling Catholic (West Des Moines, Iowa)
- College: Iowa (2020–2024)
- WNBA draft: 2024: 1st round, 1st overall pick
- Drafted by: Indiana Fever
- Playing career: 2024–present

Career history
- 2024–present: Indiana Fever

Career highlights
- 3× WNBA All-Star (2024–2026); 2× All-WNBA First Team (2024, 2026); WNBA Rookie of the Year (2024); WNBA All-Rookie Team (2024); WNBA Commissioner's Cup champion (2025); WNBA assists leader (2024); AP Female Athlete of the Year (2024); 2× AP Player of the Year (2023, 2024); 2× Honda-Broderick Cup (2023, 2024); 2× Honda Sports Award (2023, 2024); 2× James E. Sullivan Award (2023, 2024); 2× John R. Wooden Award (2023, 2024); 2× Naismith College Player of the Year (2023, 2024); 2× USBWA National Player of the Year (2023, 2024); 2× Wade Trophy (2023, 2024); 4× First-team All-American – USBWA (2021–2024); 3× First-team All-American – AP (2022–2024); 4× All-American – WBCA (2021–2024); Second-team All-American – AP (2021); 2× Women's Basketball Academic All-American of the Year (2023, 2024); 2× Division I Academic All-American of the Year (2023, 2024); 3× First-team Academic All-America (2022–2024); 3× Nancy Lieberman Award (2022–2024); 3× Dawn Staley Award (2021–2023); 2× Big Ten Female Athlete of the Year (2023, 2024); 3× Big Ten Player of the Year (2022–2024); 3× Big Ten tournament MOP (2022–2024); 4× First-team All-Big Ten (2021–2024); WBCA Co-Freshman of the Year (2021); USBWA National Co-Freshman of the Year (2021); Big Ten All-Freshman Team (2021); Big Ten Freshman of the Year (2021); 3× NCAA season scoring leader (2021, 2022, 2024); 3× NCAA season assists leader (2022–2024); NCAA Division I all-time scoring leader; No. 22 retired by Iowa Hawkeyes; McDonald's All-American (2020); Iowa Miss Basketball (2020); FIBA Under-19 World Cup MVP (2021); 2026 FIBA WWC Qualifiers MVP (Puerto Rico region)
- Stats at WNBA.com
- Stats at Basketball Reference
Medals
Women's basketball
Representing the United States
World Cup
Gold medal – first place	2026 Germany
FIBA Under-19 World Cup
Gold medal – first place	2021 Hungary	Team
Gold medal – first place	2019 Thailand	Team
FIBA Americas Under-16 Championship
Gold medal – first place	2017 Argentina	Team

Caitlin Elizabeth Clark (born January 22, 2002) is an American professional basketball player for the Indiana Fever of the Women's National Basketball Association (WNBA). Regarded as one of the greatest female collegiate players, Clark was twice named national college basketball player of the year and became the NCAA Division I all-time leading scorer while playing for the Iowa Hawkeyes. Known for her shooting range and play, she has helped popularize women's basketball, a phenomenon dubbed the "Caitlin Clark effect". She is a three-time WNBA All-Star and two-time All-WNBA selection.

Clark attended Dowling Catholic High School in her hometown of West Des Moines, Iowa, where she was named a McDonald's All-American and rated the fourth-best player in her class by ESPN. In her freshman season with Iowa, she led the NCAA Division I in scoring and earned All-American honors. As a sophomore, Clark became the first women's player to lead Division I in points and assists in a single season. In her junior season, she was the national player of the year and led Iowa to its first national championship game, again leading Division I in assists and setting Big Ten single-season marks in points and assists. As a senior, she repeated as national player of the year and helped Iowa return to the national title game. She also set Division I women's career and single-season records in points and three-pointers, broke the conference record in assists, and led the nation in points and assists.

Selected first overall by the Indiana Fever in the 2024 WNBA draft, Clark quickly emerged as a premier guard in the league, earning WNBA Rookie of the Year and All-WNBA First Team honors in her first season. She also set league single-season and single-game records in assists, broke the rookie scoring record, and became the first rookie to achieve a triple-double. In 2026, Clark set the Fever franchise single-game scoring record with 45 points.

Clark is a member of the United States women's national basketball team, winning the gold medal with Team USA at the 2026 FIBA Women's Basketball World Cup. She also won three gold medals at the youth international level, including two at the FIBA Under-19 Women's World Cup, where she was named Most Valuable Player in 2021.

== Early life ==
Caitlin Elizabeth Clark was born on January 22, 2002, in Des Moines, Iowa. Her father, Brent Clark, is a sales executive at Concentric International, and played basketball and baseball at Simpson College. Caitlin's mother, Anne Nizzi-Clark, who is of part Italian descent, is a former marketing executive; Anne's father was the football coach and a school administrator at Dowling Catholic High School in West Des Moines, where Caitlin grew up.

Clark has an older brother, Blake, who played college football for Iowa State, and a younger brother, Colin. Her cousin, Audrey Faber, played college basketball for Creighton. Two of Clark's uncles are former college athletes: Tom Faber played basketball for Drake and Utica, and Mike Nizzi played football for Nebraska–Omaha.

Clark herself played softball, volleyball, soccer, tennis, and golf as a young child, before focusing on basketball. She began playing basketball at age five, and competed in boys' recreational leagues, because her father could not find a girls' league for her age group.

In elementary school, Clark attended St. Francis of Assisi Catholic School in Des Moines. Her former teachers say they noticed Caitlin's competitive drive on the playground, and they all felt certain that she was going to do something big later in life. When she was in third grade, her teacher gave an assignment to create a personal dream board to display their hopes and dreams for the future. Clark's dream board included "Go to college on a basketball scholarship," "Play in the WNBA," and "Be in a basketball movie."

In sixth grade, Clark joined All Iowa Attack, an Amateur Athletic Union (AAU) basketball program based in Ames, Iowa, and played for teams in the program until graduating from high school. She was coached by Dickson Jensen with Attack, and her AAU teammates included future Women's National Basketball Association (WNBA) player Ashley Joens. At age 13, she began playing several years ahead of her age group in girls' leagues.

Clark drew inspiration from Maya Moore of the Minnesota Lynx, the closest WNBA team to her hometown, and often attended their games with her father. She admired All Iowa Attack alumnus Harrison Barnes and became a fan of the North Carolina Tar Heels after Barnes joined the program.

== High school career ==
Clark played four years of varsity basketball for Dowling Catholic High School in West Des Moines under head coach Kristin Meyer. As a freshman, she averaged 15.3 points, 4.7 assists and 2.3 steals per game. She earned Class 5A All-State third-team accolades from the Iowa Newspaper Association and All-Iowa honorable mention from The Des Moines Register. (Note: In girls' basketball, 5A is one of five classifications governed by the Iowa Girls High School Athletic Union and includes the largest 40 schools by enrollment.) Clark led her team to a 19–5 record and the Class 5A state tournament, where they lost to eventual champions Valley High School in the first round. In her sophomore season, she averaged 27.1 points, 6.5 rebounds, 4 assists and 2.3 steals per game, ranking second in the state in scoring. Clark was named first-team Class 5A All-State by the Iowa Print Sports Writers Association (IPSWA) and Central Iowa Metro League Player of the Year by The Des Moines Register. She helped Dowling reach the Class 5A state quarterfinals and achieve a 20–4 record. After being the penultimate cut from the 12-player Team USA roster for the Under-17 FIBA World Cup in the summer of 2018, Clark used this as motivation and began developing her pull-up jump shot as well as her deep step-back. That same summer, she led the All Iowa Attack to win the Nike Elite Youth Basketball League championship, scoring 23 points in a 64–61 victory over the Cal Storm in the final.

On February 4, 2019, during her junior season, Clark scored 60 points in a 90–78 win against Mason City High School. Her 60-point game was the second-highest single-game point total in Iowa five-on-five girls' basketball history, surpassed only by Abby Roe's 61 in 1996. She also set the state single-game record with 13 three-pointers. On February 25, Clark set the Class 5A state tournament single-game scoring record with 42 points in a 75–70 triple-overtime win over Waukee High School in the quarterfinals. She helped Dowling reach the semifinals of the tournament and finish with a 17–8 record. As a junior, Clark led the state in scoring and averaged 32.6 points, 6.8 rebounds, 3.6 assists and 2.3 steals per game. She was named Iowa Gatorade Player of the Year and repeated as a Class 5A All-State first-team selection by the IPSWA. As a senior, Clark averaged 33.4 points, eight rebounds, four assists and 2.7 steals per game, leading the state in scoring for a second time. Her team finished with a 19–4 record and reached the Class 5A regional final, where they were upset by Sioux City East High School. Clark finished her career with the fourth-most points (2,547) and the sixth-most three-pointers (283) in Iowa five-on-five history. She was awarded Iowa Gatorade Player of the Year, Des Moines Register All-Iowa Athlete of the Year, and Iowa Miss Basketball, while making the IPSWA Class 5A All-State first-team. Clark was selected to compete in the McDonald's All-American Game and the Jordan Brand Classic, two prestigious high school all-star games, but both games were canceled due to the COVID-19 pandemic.

In her first two years at Dowling, Clark was a starter on the school's varsity soccer team but focused on basketball for her final two years. In her freshman season, she scored 23 goals and was named to the Class 3A All-Iowa team by The Des Moines Register.

In the fall of 2025, Clark was inducted into Dowling Catholic's Hall of Fame.

=== Recruiting ===
Clark was recruited by NCAA Division I basketball programs before starting high school, receiving her first letter of interest from Missouri State before seventh grade. At the end of her high school career, she was considered a five-star recruit and the fourth-best player in her class by ESPN. On November 12, 2019, Clark announced that she would commit to play college basketball for Iowa over offers from Iowa State and Notre Dame. Clark was drawn to the team's up-tempo style of offense and head coach Lisa Bluder's development of point guards. She also expected to immediately have a key role on the team with the departure of Kathleen Doyle, the reigning Big Ten Player of the Year.

== College career ==
=== 2020–21: Freshman season ===
Clark entered her freshman season as Iowa's starting point guard. She assumed a leading role alongside starting center Monika Czinano; the duo was nicknamed "The Law Firm" by analyst Christy Winters-Scott. On November 25, 2020, she made her collegiate debut, recording 27 points, eight rebounds, and four assists in a 96–81 win over Northern Iowa. In her second game, on December 2, she posted her first double-double with 30 points and 13 assists in a 103–97 victory over Drake. On December 22, in a 92–65 victory over Western Illinois, she registered the first triple-double by an Iowa player since Samantha Logic did so in 2015. Despite shooting 3-of-15 from the field, Clark had 13 points, 13 rebounds, and 10 assists during the game. On January 6, 2021, she recorded 37 points, 11 rebounds and four assists in a 92–79 win against Minnesota. Clark posted a season-high 39 points, 10 rebounds and seven assists in an 88–81 win over Nebraska on February 11, breaking the single-game scoring record for Pinnacle Bank Arena, the home venue of Nebraska. On February 28, she scored 18 points and had a season-high 14 assists in an 84–70 win over Wisconsin. At the end of the regular season, Clark was a unanimous Big Ten Freshman of the Year and first-team All-Big Ten selection. She was a 13-time Big Ten Freshman of the Week, setting a conference record, and led the Big Ten with five Player of the Week awards.

Clark helped Iowa achieve a runner-up finish at the Big Ten tournament, where she was named to the all-tournament team and recorded 37 assists, the most in the event's history. In the second round of the NCAA tournament, she posted 35 points, seven rebounds and six assists in an 86–72 win over Kentucky. She broke program single-game records for points and three-pointers (6) in the tournament. Iowa reached the Sweet 16, where Clark scored 21 points in a 92–72 loss to first-seeded UConn. She was named a first-team All-American by the United States Basketball Writers Association (USBWA), a second-team All-American by the Associated Press (AP) and made the Women's Basketball Coaches Association (WBCA) Coaches' All-America team. Clark became the first freshman to win the Dawn Staley Award, which honors the best Division I guard. She shared two major Division I freshman of the year awards with Paige Bueckers of UConn: the Tamika Catchings Award, presented by the USBWA, and the WBCA Freshman of the Year award. As a freshman, Clark averaged 26.6 points, 7.1 assists, and 5.9 rebounds per game. She led the NCAA Division I in scoring and ranked second in assists and three-pointers per game. Her totals in points, assists, field goals and three-pointers also led Division I. She set program freshman records for points and assists and had the fourth-highest scoring average in Iowa history.

=== 2021–22: Sophomore season ===
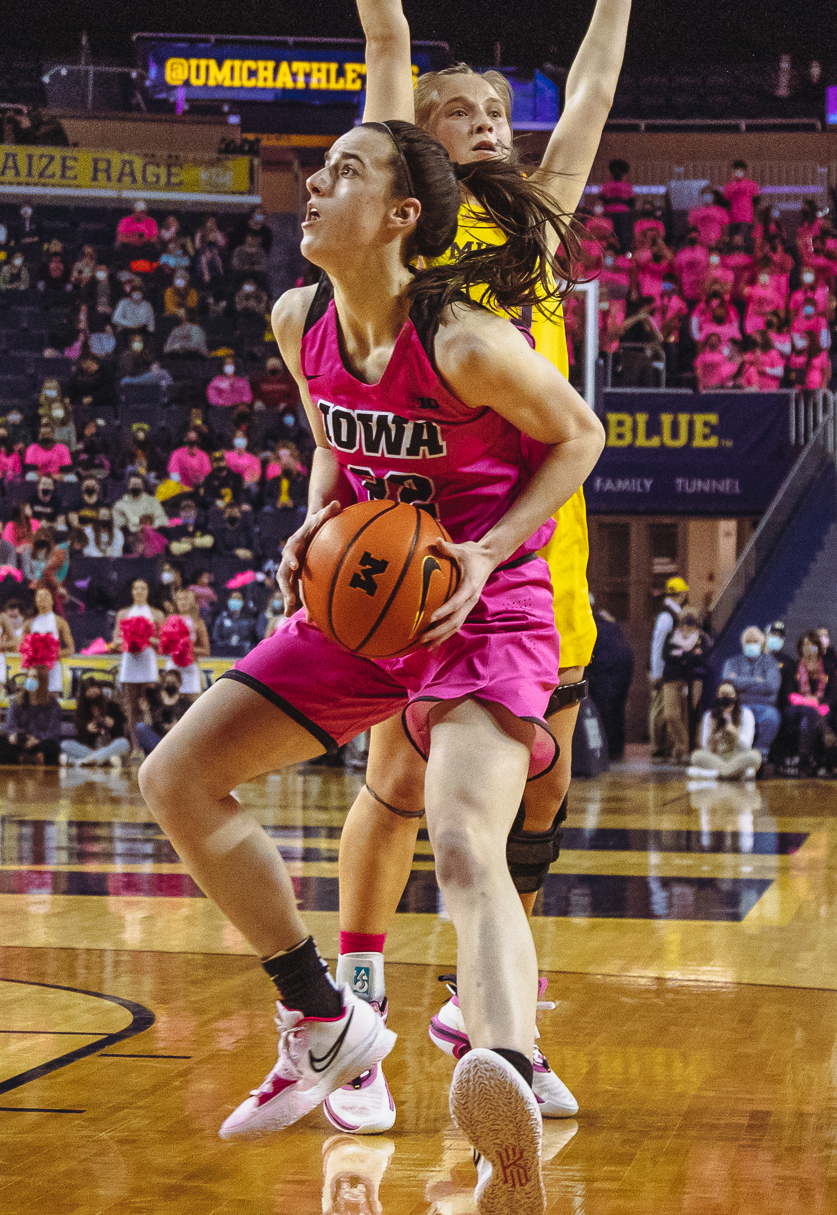
Clark during her 46-point game against Michigan in 2022

On November 9, 2021, Clark made her sophomore season debut, recording 26 points, eight rebounds and six assists in a 93–50 win over New Hampshire. On January 2, 2022, she posted 44 points and eight assists in a 93–56 win over Evansville. Clark broke the Carver–Hawkeye Arena women's single-game scoring record and surpassed Kelsey Mitchell of Ohio State as the fastest Big Ten player to reach 1,000 career points. On January 16, 2022, she recorded her fourth career triple-double, with 31 points, 10 rebounds and 10 assists in a 93–83 victory over Nebraska. In her next game, four days later, Clark posted 35 points, 13 rebounds and 11 assists in a 105–49 win over Minnesota. She became the first Division I men's or women's player to record consecutive triple-doubles with at least 30 points and the first women's player in Big Ten history with consecutive triple-doubles. On January 25, Clark had 18 assists, (Note: The Daily Iowan, the Associated Press, and Sports Illustrated all cited Clark as having 17 assists in their initial coverage of the game, a figure listed in the Hawkeyes' official bio of Clark. However, both The Daily Iowan and Sports Illustrated later wrote that Clark had 18 assists in the game, a figure also listed by Sports Reference.) which set program and tied conference single-game records, in addition to 20 points and seven rebounds in a 107–79 win against Penn State. On January 31, she recorded 43 points, seven assists and four rebounds in a 92–88 loss to Ohio State. On February 6, Clark scored a season-high 46 points, including 25 in the fourth quarter, and had 10 assists in a 98–90 loss to Michigan. She set the women's single-game scoring record for Crisler Center, the home arena of Michigan. After leading Iowa to a share of the Big Ten regular season title, she was unanimously named Big Ten Player of the Year and first-team All-Big Ten by the league's coaches and media.

On March 5, 2022, in the semifinals of the Big Ten tournament, Clark recorded 41 points and nine rebounds in an 83–66 win over Nebraska. She led Iowa to the title and was named the tournament's most outstanding player (MOP). Her team was upset by 10th-seeded Creighton in the second round of the NCAA tournament, where Clark was held to a season-low 15 points and 11 assists, shooting 4-of-19 from the field, in a 64–62 loss. She was a unanimous first-team All-American: she earned first-team All-American honors from the AP and the USBWA, and was a WBCA Coaches' All-America Team selection. For her sophomore year, she was named a first-team Division I Academic All-American by the College Sports Information Directors of America, since renamed College Sports Communicators (CSC). Clark became the first back-to-back recipient of the Dawn Staley Award and won the Nancy Lieberman Award as the top Division I point guard. As a sophomore, she averaged 27 points, eight rebounds and eight assists per game. Clark was the first women's player to lead Division I in points and assists per game in a single season. She also led Division I in total points, free throws and triple-doubles.

=== 2022–23: Junior season ===
Entering her junior season, Clark was a unanimous selection for the AP preseason All-America team and was named Big Ten preseason player of the year by the league's coaches and media. On November 18, 2022, she suffered an ankle injury with 3.8 seconds left in an 84–83 loss to Kansas State, where she recorded 27 points, 10 rebounds and seven assists. She played in Iowa's next game against Belmont on November 20, scoring 33 points in a 73–62 victory. On December 1, she scored a season-high 45 points in a 94–81 loss to NC State. Three days later, Clark posted her seventh career triple-double, with 22 points, 10 rebounds and 10 assists in a 102–71 win over Wisconsin. She surpassed Samantha Logic as the Big Ten career leader in triple-doubles.

On December 21, in her 75th game, Clark tied Elena Delle Donne of Delaware as the fastest Division I women's player to reach 2,000 career points since the 1999–2000 season, scoring 20 points in a 92–54 win over Dartmouth. On January 23, 2023, Clark recorded 28 points, 15 assists and 10 rebounds in an 83–72 win over AP No. 2 Ohio State, who were previously unbeaten. On February 2, she had 42 points, eight assists and seven rebounds in a 96–82 victory over Maryland. On February 26, Clark recorded 34 points, nine rebounds and nine assists, making a game-winning three-pointer at the buzzer, in an 86–85 win against AP No. 2 Indiana. At the end of the regular season, she repeated as Big Ten Player of the Year in a unanimous vote and was named first-team All-Big Ten by the league's coaches and media.

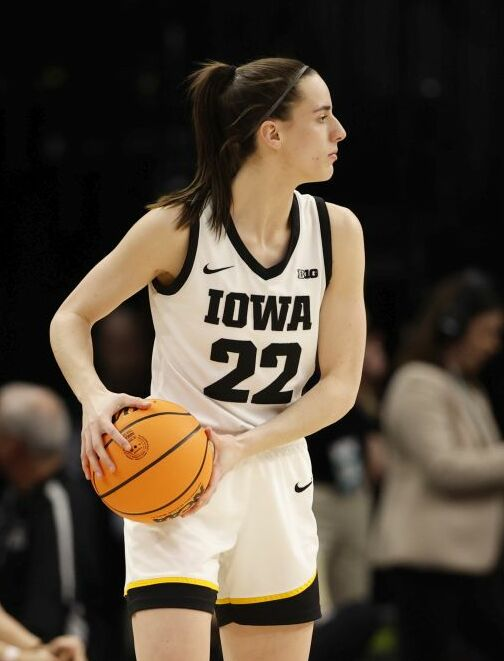
Clark with Iowa at the 2023 Big Ten tournament

Clark led Iowa to its second consecutive Big Ten tournament championship, where she earned MOP honors. In the title game, she recorded 30 points, 17 assists and 10 rebounds in a 105–72 win over Ohio State, the first triple-double in the final of the tournament. She moved to second in Division I women's history behind Sabrina Ionescu of Oregon with her tenth career triple-double. In the Elite Eight of the NCAA tournament, she recorded 41 points, 12 assists and 10 rebounds in a 97–83 win over Louisville. She became the first player in men's or women's tournament history to record a 30 or 40-point triple-double. During the game, Clark became the first Division I player to record at least 900 points and 300 assists in a single season. For her performance, Clark was named the Seattle 4 Regional Most Outstanding Player and to the regional all-tournament team as Iowa reached its first Final Four since 1993.

In the Final Four, Clark posted 41 points, eight assists, and six rebounds in a 77–73 upset win over undefeated defending champion South Carolina, ending their 42-game winning streak. She broke the single-game scoring record for the women's tournament semifinals and became the first player in tournament history with consecutive 40-point games. Clark also surpassed the program and Big Ten single-season scoring records held by Megan Gustafson. With the win, Iowa advanced to their first women's basketball championship game in program history. Though Clark had 30 points and eight assists against LSU in the national championship, Iowa lost the game, 102–85. She made eight three-pointers, the most by a men's or women's player in the title game.

Near the end of the game, LSU star Angel Reese followed Clark, making a "you can't see me" gesture implying that Clark could not keep up with her, and also pointing to her ring finger in reference to LSU's imminent championship ring. Reese received considerable criticism for the gestures, which many in the media viewed as unsportsmanlike. However, many also defended Reese's gestures and trash talk, highlighting a double standard, as Clark had made the same gesture at a previous game and did not face similar criticism. Clark herself defended Reese over criticism about the gesture. In coverage of this incident, journalists and the public have commented on the roles of race and gender in perceptions of sportsmanship. The incident has also been described as the origin of a rivalry between Clark and Reese. With 191 points in the tournament, Clark broke the men's and women's scoring records for a single NCAA tournament. Her 60 assists were the most by a player in women's tournament history.

Clark won all major national player of the year awards: AP College Basketball Player of the Year, the Honda Sports Award, the John R. Wooden Award, Naismith College Player of the Year, USBWA National Player of the Year and the Wade Trophy. She was the first unanimous national player of the year in Big Ten history. Clark won the Nancy Lieberman Award for a second time and became the first three-time winner of the Dawn Staley Award. She was a unanimous first-team All-American for a second straight season, earning first-team recognition from the AP and USBWA and making the WBCA Coaches' All-America Team. Clark was again honored by the CSC as the 2023 Division I Women's Basketball Academic All-American of the Year, before winning the same award for all Division I sports in 2023. As a junior, Clark averaged 27.8 points, 8.6 assists and 7.1 rebounds per game, leading Division I in assists and ranking second in scoring. She set Big Ten single-season records in points, assists, three-pointers and free throws, and tied her own conference record with five triple-doubles. She had the fourth-most points and assists and the third-most three-pointers in a season in Division I history. Following the season, Clark won the Best Female College Athlete ESPY Award and the Honda Cup, both honoring the top women's college athlete, and the James E. Sullivan Award, presented annually by the AAU to the top college or Olympic athlete in the United States. She was selected as the Big Ten Female Athlete of the Year.

=== 2023–24: Senior season ===
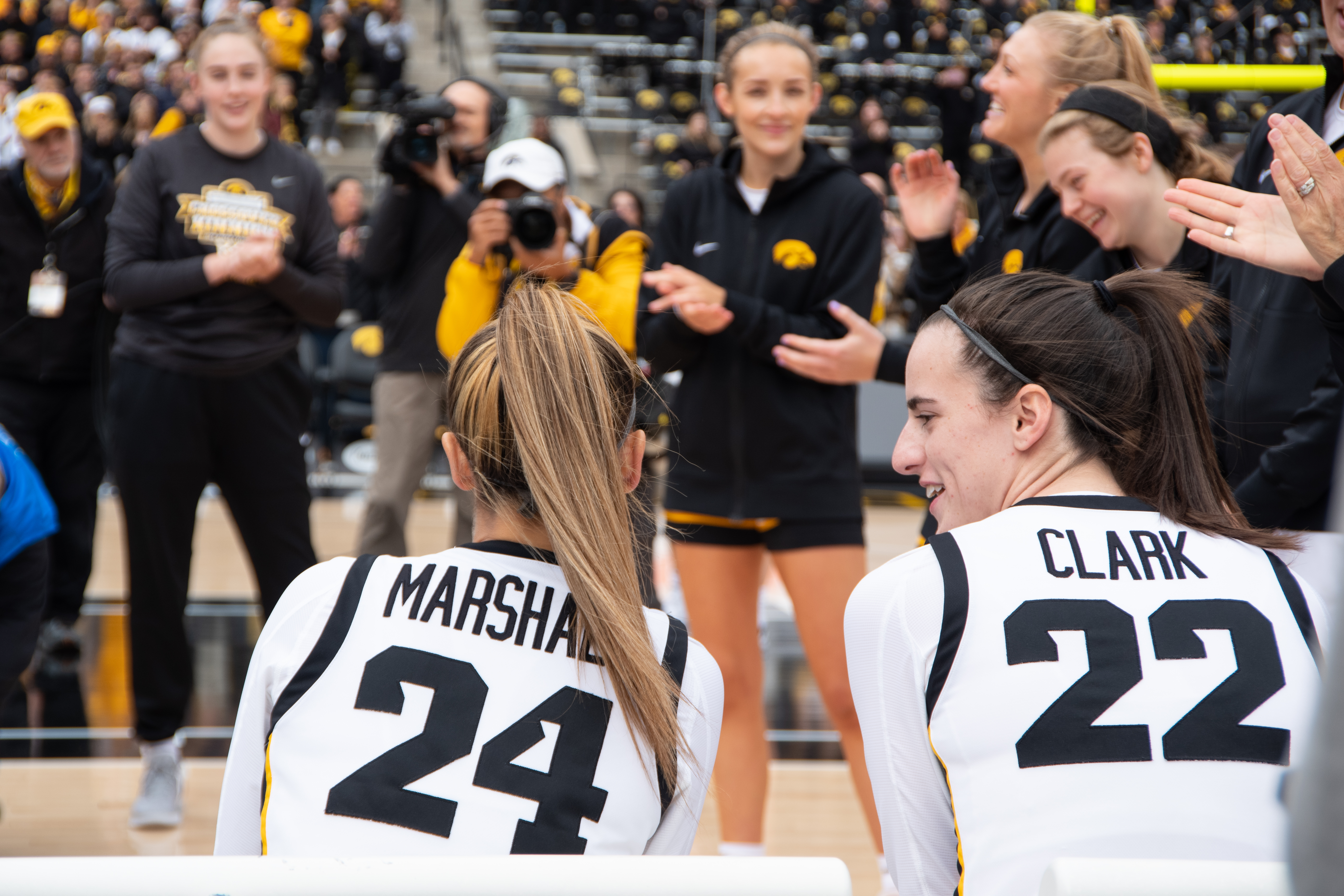
Clark on the sidelines at Crossover at Kinnick with Gabbie Marshall in 2023

Entering her senior season, Clark was named preseason Big Ten Player of the Year and earned unanimous AP preseason All-American honors. On October 15, 2023, she played in Crossover at Kinnick, a preseason exhibition game against DePaul at Kinnick Stadium, and had a triple-double of 34 points, 11 rebounds and 10 assists in a 94–72 win. The game had an attendance of 55,646, which set the women's basketball record. In her second regular season game, on November 9, Clark posted 44 points, eight rebounds and six assists in an 80–76 win over AP No. 8 Virginia Tech. In Iowa's third game, a 94–53 blowout of Northern Iowa on November 12, Clark recorded her 12th career triple-double, with 24 points, 11 assists and 10 rebounds. She became Iowa's all-time leading scorer, passing Megan Gustafson, and became only the second player in Division I history with a triple-double in four different seasons, joining Ionescu. One week later, she recorded 35 points, 10 assists, six rebounds and seven steals in a 113–90 win over Drake, passing Kelsey Plum of Washington for the most 30-point games in women's Division I history.

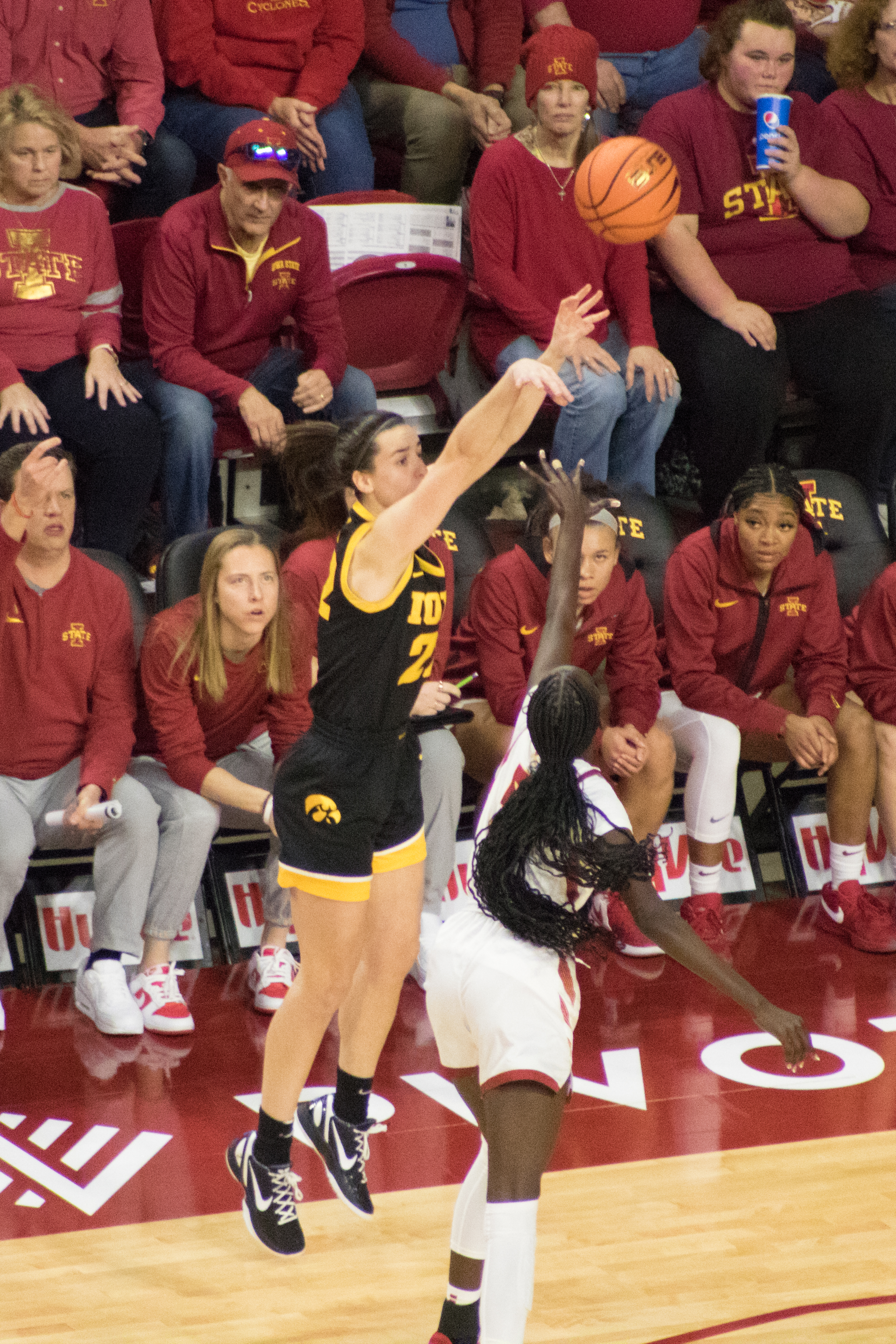
Clark in 2023

On December 6, 2023, Clark became the 15th Division I player to reach 3,000 career points and was the second-fastest to reach the mark, posting 35 points, nine rebounds and five assists in a 67–58 victory over Iowa State. On December 16, she scored 38 points and made nine three-pointers in a 104–75 win over Cleveland State. Three days later, she shared Sporting News Athlete of the Year honors with Angel Reese. Later that week, Clark was announced as the runner-up to gymnast Simone Biles for the AP Female Athlete of the Year award. On December 21, in Iowa's final non-conference game, she recorded a triple-double of 35 points, 17 rebounds, and 10 assists in the Hawkeyes' 98–69 win over Loyola Chicago. In her next game, on December 30, Clark posted 35 points and 10 assists in a 94–71 victory against Minnesota, surpassing Samantha Prahalis of Ohio State to become the Big Ten's all-time leader in assists. During the game, she also eclipsed Samantha Logic's mark for the program record in the same category. On January 2, 2024, Clark scored 40 points and made a long, game-winning three-pointer as time expired in a 76–73 win over Michigan State. Three days later, she posted 29 points, 10 rebounds and 10 assists in a 103–69 win over Rutgers. On January 8, Clark was named Big Ten Player of the Week for the 24th time in her career, breaking the conference record held by Gustafson. In her following game, she registered her second consecutive triple-double, with 26 points, 10 rebounds and 10 assists in a 96–71 victory against Purdue. On January 21, Clark recorded 45 points and seven assists in a 100–92 overtime loss to AP No. 18 Ohio State. After the game, as Ohio State fans were rushing the court, she was knocked down in a collision with a fan but did not suffer an injury, despite initially appearing to be in pain.

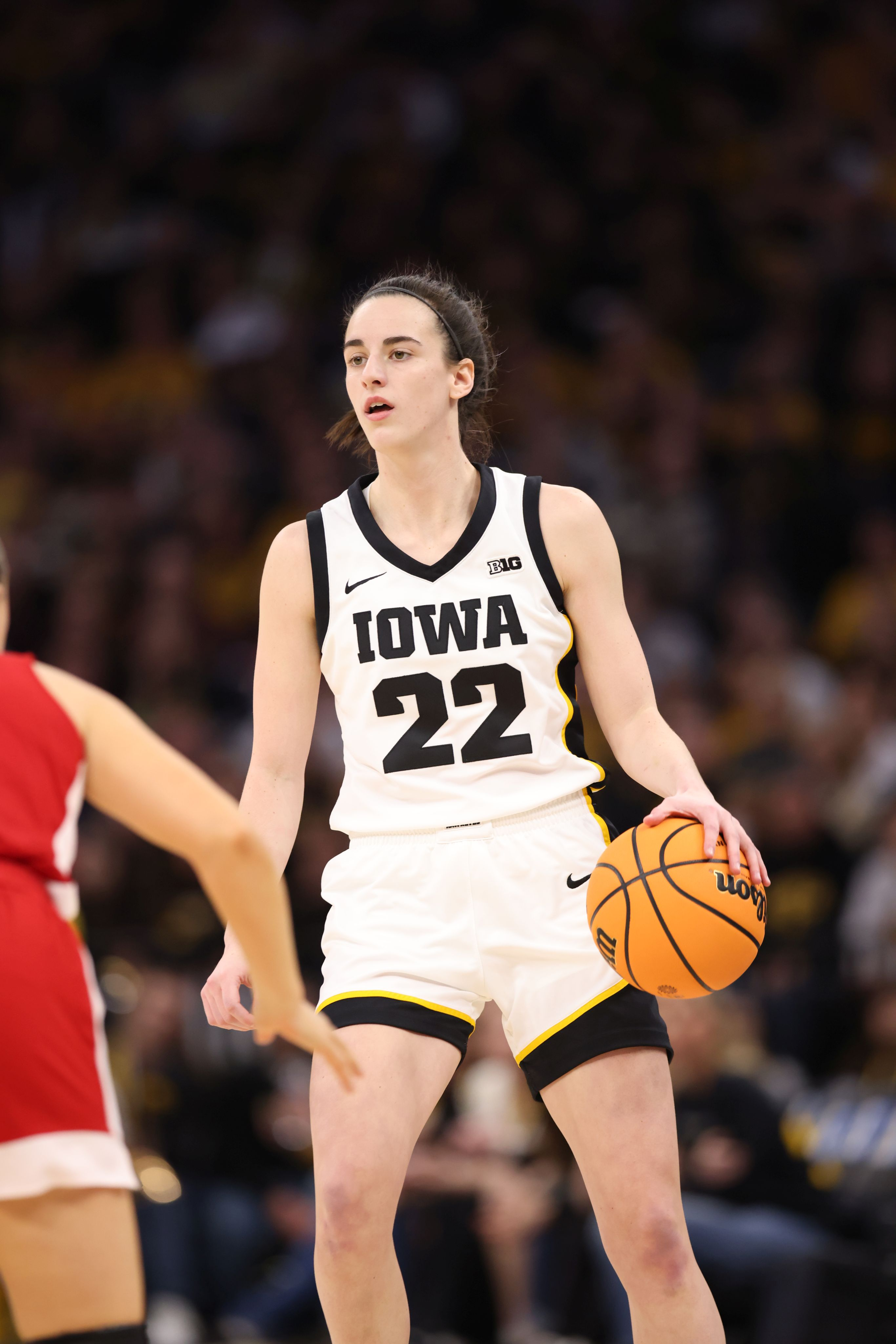
Clark at the 2024 Big Ten tournament final

On January 31, 2024, Clark posted 35 points and 10 assists in a 110–74 win over Northwestern, breaking the Big Ten all-time scoring record held by Kelsey Mitchell of Ohio State. In February, Fox began devoting a camera, called the "Caitlin Cam", to record Clark during its broadcasts of Iowa games and to stream on TikTok. She became the sixth Division I women's player with 1,000 career assists during the Hawkeyes' 82–79 loss at Nebraska on February 11, where she tallied 31 points, 10 assists and eight rebounds. On February 15, Clark became the NCAA Division I women's career scoring leader, surpassing Kelsey Plum, during a 106–89 win over Michigan. She finished the game with a career-high 49 points, 13 assists and five rebounds, eclipsing Gustafson for the program single-game scoring record. Between her points and assists, Clark was responsible for 79 of her team's points, the most by any Division I women's player in at least 25 seasons. On February 28, Clark passed Lynette Woodard, who played for Kansas in the era when the Association of Intercollegiate Athletics for Women governed women's college sports, to become the all-time leader in points among major women's college players. During the game, she posted her second straight triple-double, with 33 points, 12 assists and 10 rebounds, leading the Hawkeyes to a 108–60 win over Minnesota. She also set the Big Ten career record for three-pointers, surpassing Kelsey Mitchell, and the NCAA single-season record in the same category, previously held by Taylor Pierce of Idaho. In her final regular season game, on March 3, Clark became the NCAA Division I all-time leading scorer among men's or women's players, eclipsing Pete Maravich, who had set the men's scoring record in three seasons with LSU. She tallied 35 points, nine assists and six rebounds in a 93–83 win over AP No. 2 Ohio State. She finished the regular season as the unanimous Big Ten Player of the Year and earned first-team All-Big Ten honors from the league's coaches and media.

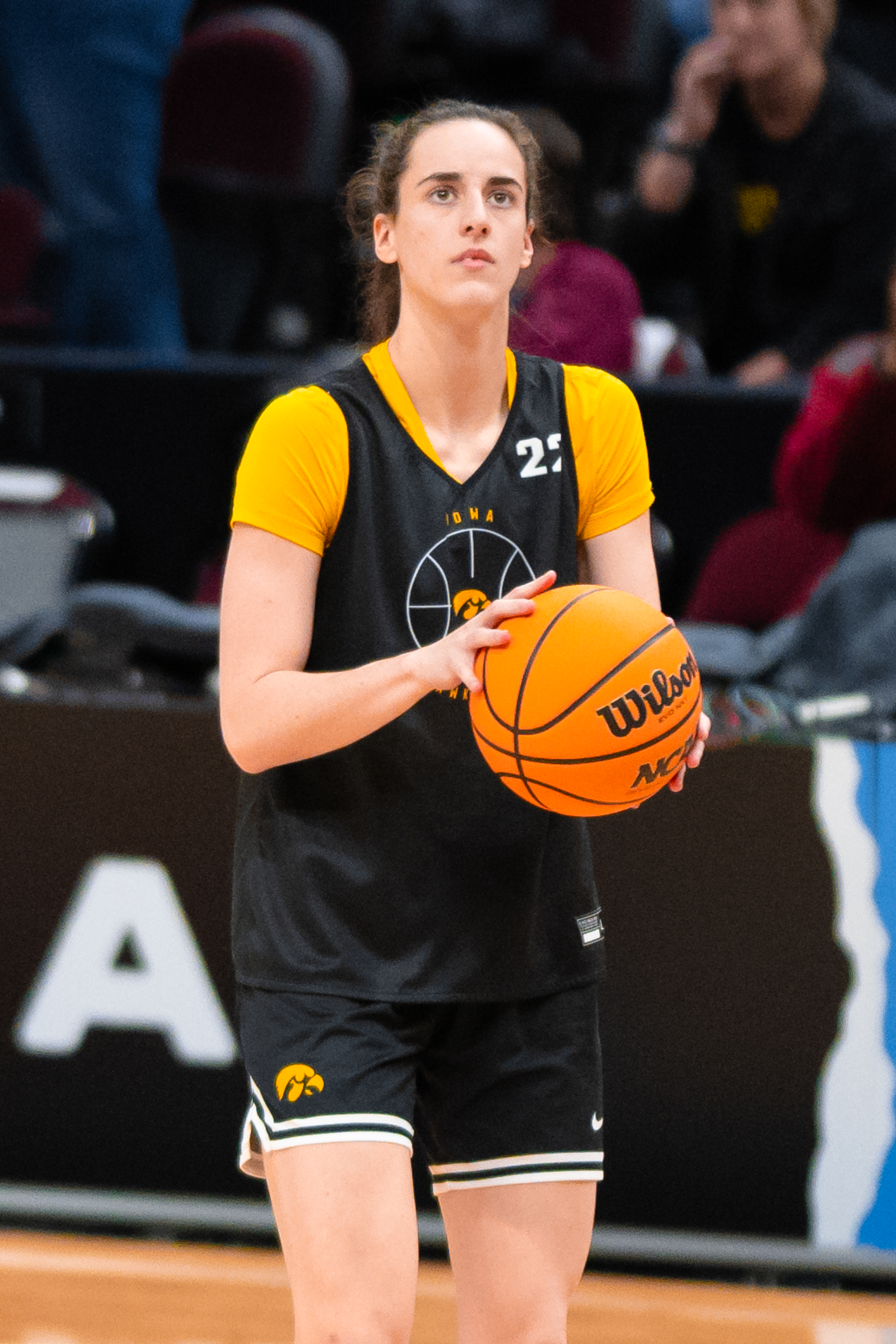
Clark at open practice before the 2024 national championship game

During the Hawkeyes' quarterfinal win over Penn State at the 2024 Big Ten tournament, Clark surpassed Stephen Curry of Davidson and Darius McGhee of Liberty for the most three-pointers in a single season by any Division I player regardless of gender. In a semifinal win over Michigan, she became the first Division I women's player to score at least 1,000 points in two different seasons and passed Mitchell as the career leading scorer in the Big Ten tournament. Clark led Iowa to its third straight Big Ten tournament title and was named MOP after recording 34 points, 12 assists and seven rebounds in a 94–89 overtime win over Nebraska in the final. In the second round of the NCAA tournament, Clark scored 32 points and surpassed Kelsey Plum for the most points in a single season in Division I women's history, leading Iowa to a 64–54 win over West Virginia. The Elite Eight saw a rematch of the 2023 national championship game against LSU, where Clark had 41 points, 12 assists and seven rebounds in a 94–87 victory, leading the Hawkeyes to their second straight Final Four and a school-record 33 wins and being named Albany 2 Regional MOP. Her nine three-pointers tied the most by a player in an NCAA tournament game. She surpassed Taylor Robertson's record of 537, set in five seasons at Oklahoma, to become the all-time Division I leader in three-pointers. Clark also broke NCAA tournament career marks in assists and three-pointers, held by Temeka Johnson of LSU and Diana Taurasi of UConn, respectively. In the Final Four, she posted 21 points, nine rebounds and seven assists in a 71–69 win over UConn, as Iowa reached the national championship game for a second consecutive season. Clark had 30 points, eight rebounds and five assists in an 87–75 loss to South Carolina, the number one overall seed, in the title game. She scored 18 points in the first quarter, the most by a player in a single period in championship game history. She also surpassed Chamique Holdsclaw of Tennessee for the NCAA tournament career scoring record.

Clark was named national player of the year for her second straight season, receiving AP Player of the Year, the Honda Sports Award, the John R. Wooden Award, Naismith College Player of the Year, USBWA National Player of the Year and the Wade Trophy. For a third time, she won the Nancy Lieberman Award as the top Division I point guard and was named a unanimous first-team All-American. At the end of her senior year, Clark again was named the CSC's Division I Academic All-American of the Year in both women's basketball and all sports, completing her college career with a 3.64 GPA. In her senior season, Clark averaged 31.6 points, 8.9 assists and 7.4 rebounds per game, leading Division I in scoring and assists. She finished with the highest career scoring average (28.42) in Division I history, passing Patricia Hoskins of Mississippi Valley State. Clark left Iowa with the most career points (3,951) and three-pointers (548), the second-most triple-doubles (17) and the third-most assists (1,144) in Division I history. For a second straight season, Clark won the Honda Cup and the James E. Sullivan Award, becoming the first two-time winner in the Sullivan Award's 94-year history. She also became the third athlete to repeat as Big Ten Female Athlete of the Year. In June 2024, Clark was nominated for three ESPY Awards. At the 2024 ESPY Awards held on July 11, 2024, Clark won the Best Female College Athlete ESPY Award for a second time, became the first female athlete to win the Best Record-Breaking Performance ESPY Award, (Note: Nominated for "Caitlin Clark becomes NCAA's all time scoring leader breaking Pete Maravich's record.") but lost out on the Best Female Athlete ESPY Award to two-time WNBA MVP and two-time WNBA champion, A'ja Wilson.

On February 29, 2024, Clark announced that she would declare for the 2024 WNBA draft, forgoing her fifth season of eligibility, which was granted to all players during the 2020–21 season due to the COVID-19 pandemic. She was projected to be the first overall pick in the 2024 WNBA draft by many publications, including ESPN, USA Today and CBS Sports.

Following the conclusion of Clark's senior season, it was announced that Iowa would retire her jersey number, making her the third player in program history to receive the honor. On February 2, 2025, following the Hawkeyes' win over No. 4 USC, Clark's No. 22 jersey was retired by the University of Iowa. In October 2025, the Associated Press selected Clark as one of the greatest collegiate players in the women’s poll era alongside Cheryl Miller, Diana Taurasi, Candace Parker, and Breanna Stewart as the starting five players.

== Professional career ==
=== WNBA ===
==== 2024: Rookie season ====
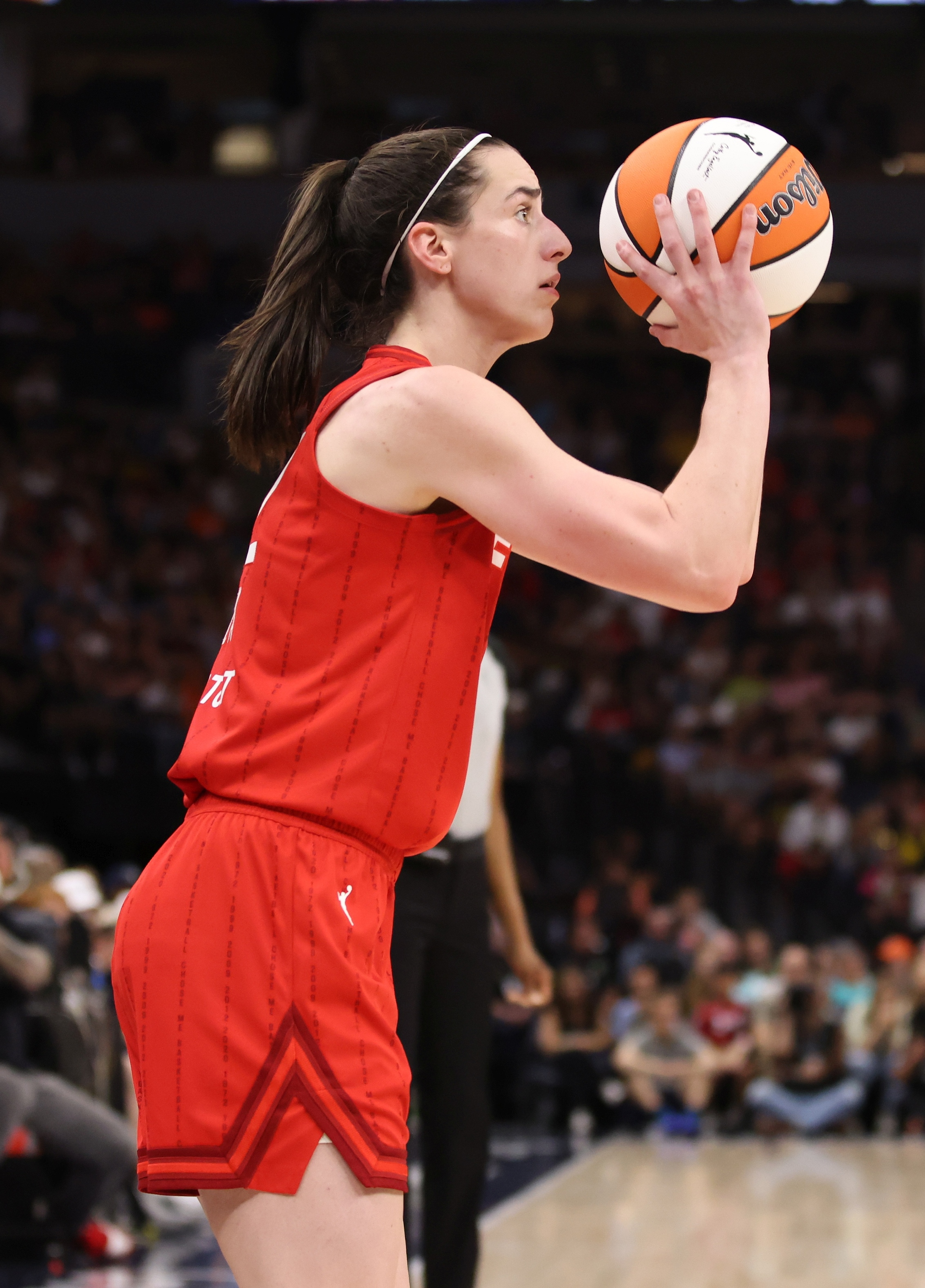
Clark shooting for the Indiana Fever in 2024

On April 15, 2024, Clark was selected as the first overall pick of the 2024 WNBA draft by the Indiana Fever. On April 27, she signed her rookie scale contract with the team. Clark played her first regular season game on May 14, scoring 20 points in a 92–71 loss to the Connecticut Sun. She also committed 10 turnovers, the most in a debut in WNBA history. Ten days later, Clark posted her first double-double with 11 points, 10 rebounds and eight assists to help the Fever claim their first regular season win over the Los Angeles Sparks, 78–73. In a rematch with the Sparks on May 28, she recorded 30 points, six assists and five rebounds in an 88–82 loss.

On June 7, 2024, Clark scored 30 points again and tied Crystal Robinson's rookie single-game record with seven three-pointers. She also tallied eight rebounds, six assists and four steals, leading her team to an 85–83 win over the Washington Mystics. On June 23, Clark set the Fever single-game record with 13 assists, while adding 17 points and six rebounds, in an 88–87 loss to the Chicago Sky. On July 2, she was selected to play in the WNBA All-Star Game. Four days later, Clark became the first WNBA rookie and the first Fever player ever to record a triple-double, registering 19 points, 12 rebounds, and 13 assists in an 83–78 victory over the New York Liberty. On July 14, Clark surpassed the WNBA single-season record in turnovers in an 81–74 loss to the Minnesota Lynx. Three days later, on July 17, she scored 24 points and set the WNBA single-game assists record (19), passing Courtney Vandersloot, in a 101–93 loss to the Dallas Wings. She scored or assisted on 66 points, breaking Diana Taurasi's mark from 2006 for points produced in a game. In the All-Star Game, she became the seventh WNBA rookie to be named an All-Star starter and set the rookie record for assists in the game, with 10.

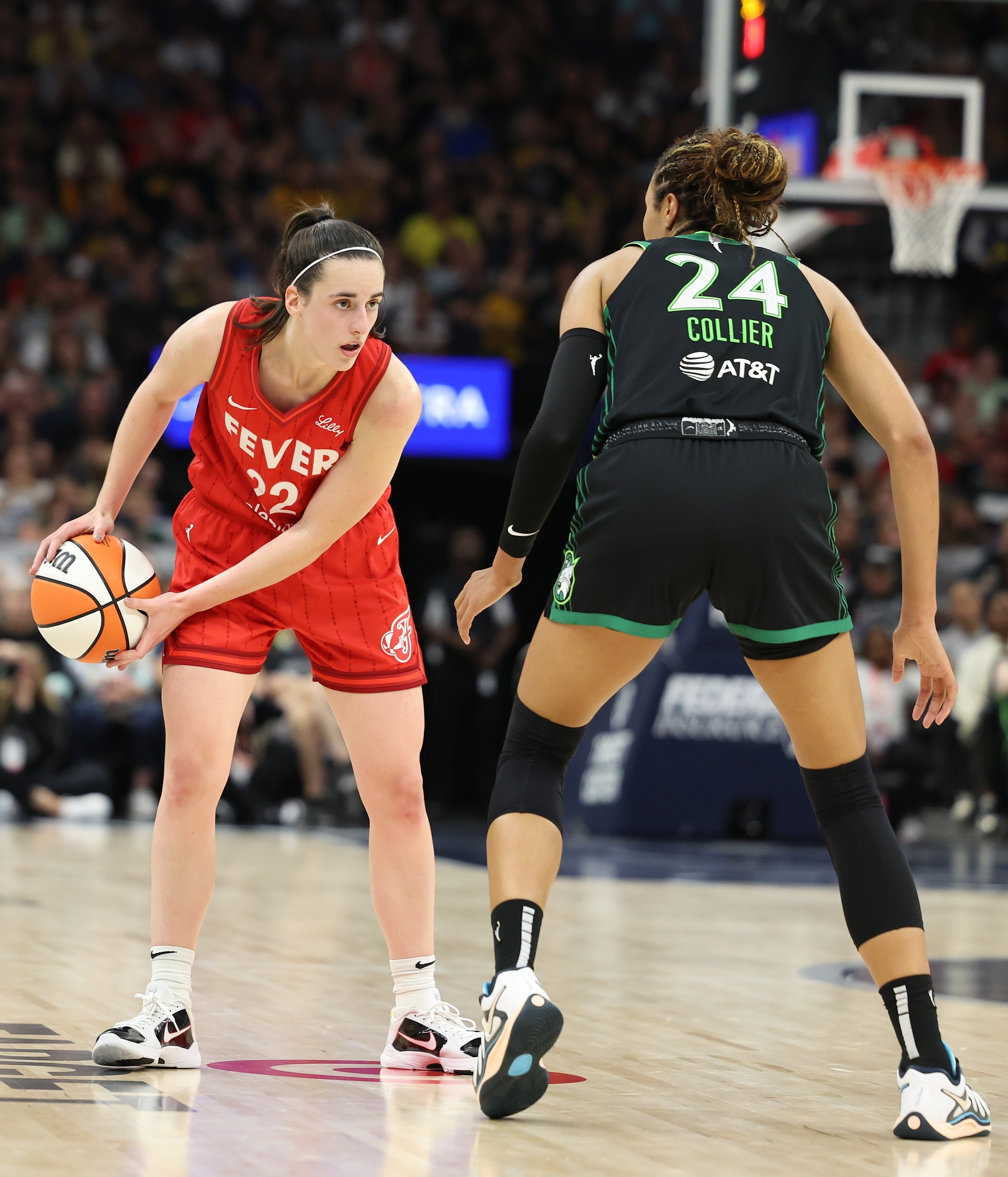
Clark (left) being defended by Napheesa Collier in 2024

On August 18, 2024, Clark set a new WNBA rookie assist record, surpassing the 225 assist record previously held by Ticha Penicheiro since 1998, in a 92–75 win over the Seattle Storm. Ten days later, she broke the record for three-pointers made in a rookie season, surpassing Rhyne Howard's total from 2022, as her team defeated the Connecticut Sun, 84–80. On August 30, Clark tallied 31 points with 12 assists, leading her team to a 100–81 victory over the Chicago Sky. On September 4, she registered her second triple-double, with 24 points, 10 rebounds and 10 assists in a 93–86 win over the Los Angeles Sparks. On September 13, Clark broke the single-season assist record as her team lost to the Las Vegas Aces, 78–74. In her next game, two days later, she scored a career-high 35 points in a 110–109 win over the Dallas Wings, passing Seimone Augustus' rookie scoring record. Clark finished the regular season averaging 19.2 points, a league-high 8.4 assists and 5.7 rebounds per game. She made a league-high 122 three-pointers, the second-most in a single season behind Sabrina Ionescu.

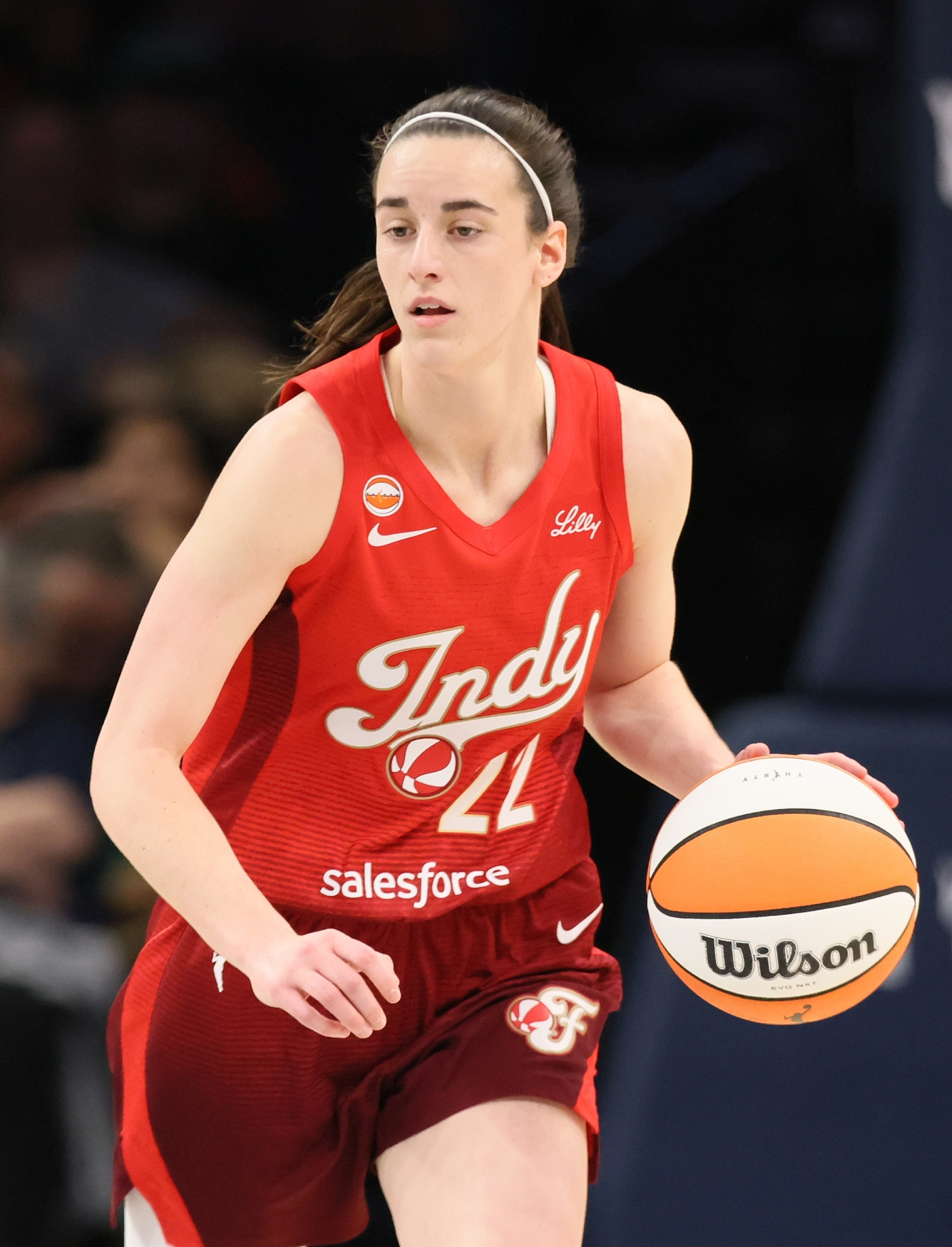
Clark with the Indiana Fever in 2026

Clark led the Fever to their best record (20–20) and first playoff appearance since 2016. Her team was swept by the Connecticut Sun in the first round. In Game 2, she scored 25 points with nine assists in a season-ending 87–81 loss. Clark was named WNBA Rookie of the Year, receiving 66 of 67 votes for the award. She became the first rookie since Candace Parker in 2008, and the fifth rookie in league history, to make the All-WNBA First Team. In December 2024, Clark was named Athlete of the Year by Time magazine and Female Athlete of the Year by the AP. In June 2025, Clark was nominated for two ESPY Awards, Best Record-Breaking Performance (for breaking the WNBA records single-game assists and single-season assists) and Best WNBA Player. At the 2025 ESPY Awards, Clark won the ESPY for Best WNBA Player for the 2024 season.

==== 2025 ====
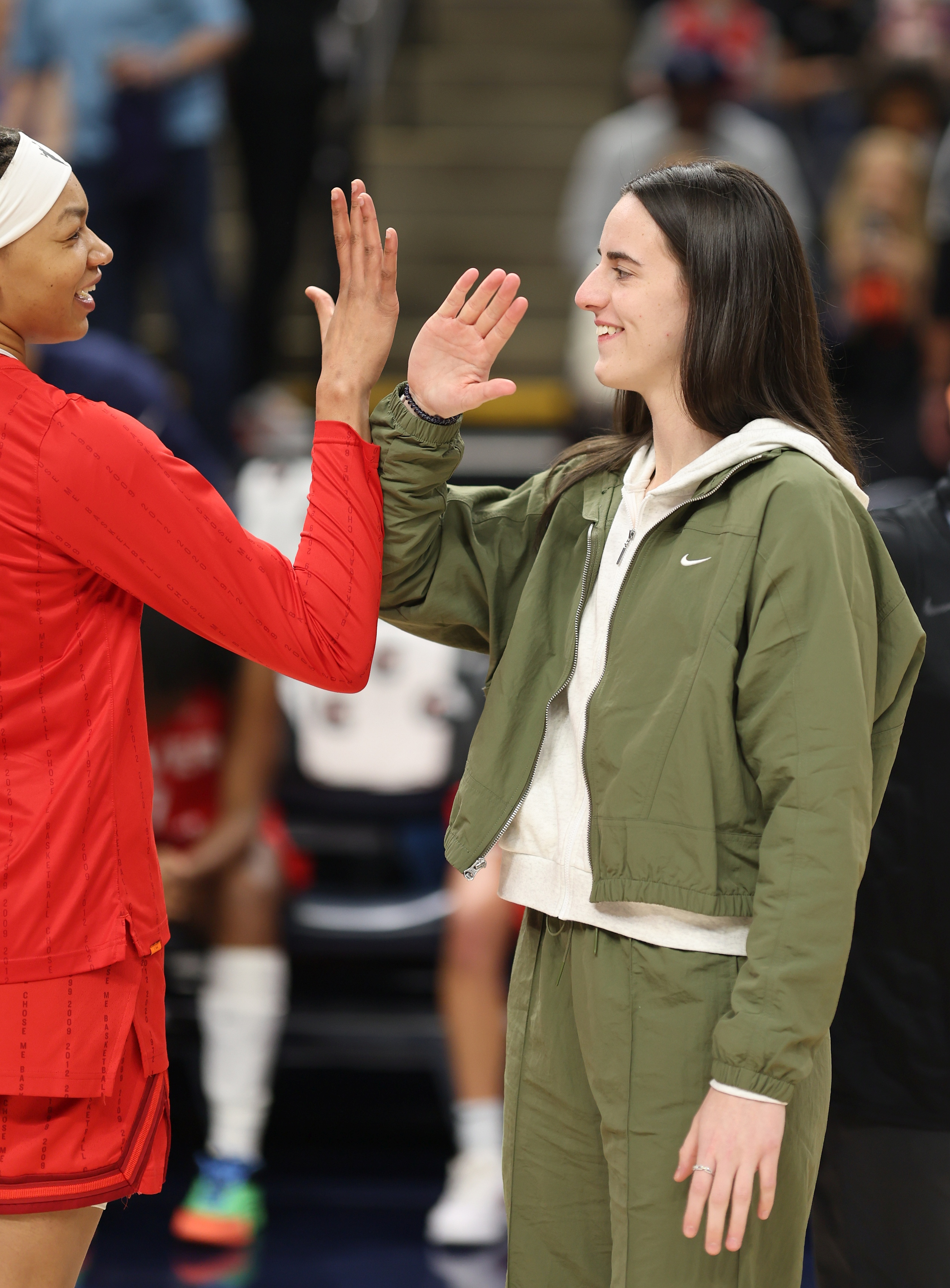
Clark celebrates with teammate Makayla Timpson in 2025, while sidelined with an injury

Clark sustained a left quadriceps injury during training camp for the 2025 season, and did not play in the Fever's preseason opener on May 3 against the Washington Mystics due to quad tightness. She returned for her team's remaining two preseason games in early May.

On May 17, 2025, Clark made her regular season debut, recording her third career triple-double, with 20 points, 10 rebounds, and 10 assists in a 93–58 win over the Chicago Sky. In her second game, she had 27 points and 11 assists in a 91–90 loss to the Atlanta Dream, eclipsing Sabrina Ionescu for the most 25-point, 10-assist games in WNBA history. On May 26, the Fever announced that Clark would miss at least two weeks with a left quad strain. After a five-game absence, she returned on June 14 and recorded a season-high 32 points, eight rebounds, and nine assists in a 102–88 victory over the New York Liberty. She made seven three-pointers during the game, including three straight in the first quarter. On June 26, Clark was sidelined again with a left groin injury. Three days later, she earned her second WNBA All-Star selection and was named a team captain for the game. Clark returned on July 9, six days before injuring her right groin in the final minute against the Connecticut Sun. She remained sidelined for the All-Star Game and the Three-Point Contest, in which she had been scheduled to compete. During an August practice, she sustained a bone bruise to her left ankle, while still recovering from her previous injury. On September 4, she was ruled out for the remainder of the season.

Limited to 13 games by injuries, Clark averaged 16.5 points, 8.8 assists, and 5.0 rebounds per game. She endured a shooting slump throughout her season, finishing at 27.9 percent from three-point range and 36.7 percent from the field, including a three-game stretch in June in which she shot 1-of-23 on three-pointers. Despite Clark's absence, the Fever reached the semifinals of the 2025 WNBA playoffs, where they were defeated by the eventual champion Las Vegas Aces in overtime in a decisive Game 5.

==== 2026 ====
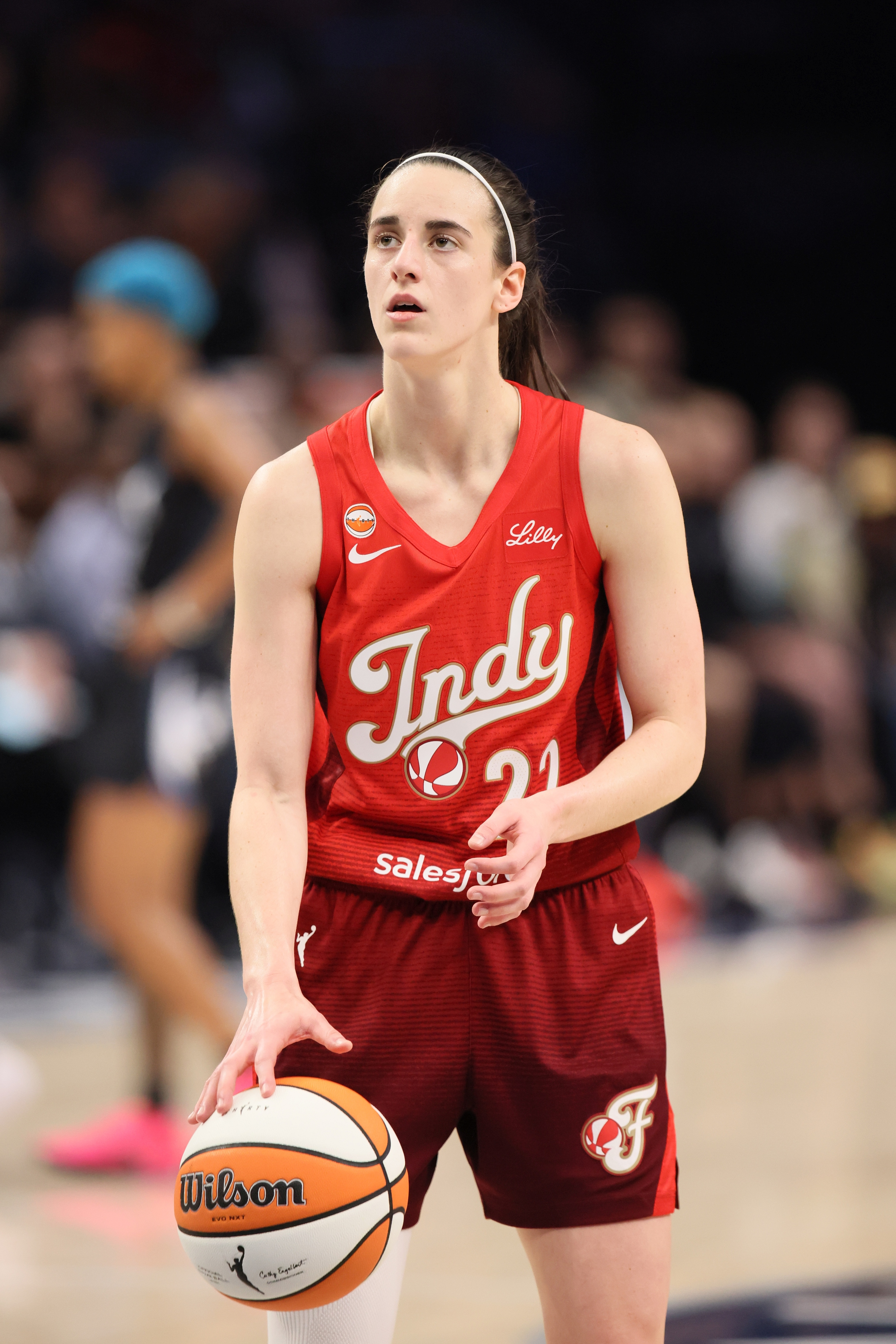
Clark with the Fever in 2026

On April 28, 2026, the Fever exercised their fourth-year option for Clark, extending her contract into the 2027 season. On May 9, Clark played her first regular season game since returning from injury, posting 20 points, five rebounds, and seven assists in a 107–104 loss to the Dallas Wings. On May 15, she had 32 points and 10 assists in a 104–102 overtime loss to the Washington Mystics. Clark made five of her seven three-pointers in the fourth quarter, setting a team record for most three-pointers made in a quarter. She also surpassed Courtney Vandersloot's record for the most 20-point, 10-assist games in WNBA history. On May 20, Clark missed her first game of the season against the Portland Fire due to back soreness. On June 8, she made a game-winning three-pointer as part of a 19-point effort in a 78–76 win over the Mystics. Clark left a June 24 game against the Phoenix Mercury early with a back injury, causing her to miss three games.

On July 2, 2026, Clark was named a WNBA All-Star for a third straight year. On July 17, she scored a career-high and franchise-record 45 points with 10 assists in a 110–107 victory over the Seattle Storm, becoming the first WNBA player to ever record at least 40 points and 10 assists in a game. On July 31, Clark had her fourth career triple-double, and her first of the season, with 26 points, 10 rebounds, and 10 assists in a 112–98 win against the Portland Fire. On August 23, she recorded 37 points and 10 assists, making a career-high eight three-pointers, in a 113–90 win over the Chicago Sky. On August 28, in the following game, she recorded 34 points and 12 assists in a 111–91 win over the Connecticut Sun, becoming the first player in WNBA history to record 30+ points 10+ assists in consecutive games, helping the Fever qualify for the WNBA playoffs for the third consecutive season.

== National team career ==
=== Junior national team ===
Clark represented the United States at the 2017 FIBA Under-16 Women's Americas Championship in Buenos Aires, Argentina. She came off the bench and averaged 8.8 points per game, helping her team achieve a 5–0 record and win the gold medal. Clark played at the 2019 FIBA Under-19 Women's Basketball World Cup in Bangkok, Thailand. In seven games, she averaged 5.3 points per game and won another gold medal, as her team finished with a 7–0 record. Clark competed at the 2021 FIBA Under-19 Women's Basketball World Cup in Debrecen, Hungary, and led the United States to the gold medal. She averaged a team-high 14.3 points, 5.6 assists, and 5.3 rebounds per game, was named Most Valuable Player, and made the All-Tournament Team.

=== Senior national team ===
In March 2024, Clark was one of 14 players, and the only college player, to receive an invitation from the United States national team to the final training camp for the 2024 Summer Olympics. However, she was unable to attend the camp because she was playing in the 2024 NCAA tournament that same week. Clark was not named to the final roster, a decision that faced scrutiny due to her popularity. The Olympic selection committee stated their criteria for selecting players included "adaptability to the international game" and experience playing with the senior national team which ultimately contributed to their decision to exclude Clark from the final roster.

In December 2025, Clark participated in her first senior national training camp. In February 2026, she was named to the roster to represent the United States in the FIBA World Cup qualification tournament in San Juan, Puerto Rico. On March 12, 2026, her first game after recovering from an eight-month injury, she scored eight points in a 91–48 win over Puerto Rico. Clark averaged 11.6 points and 6.4 assists during the tournament, helping Team USA to a 5–0 record. She was announced as the MVP of the tournament.

In August 2026, Clark was named to the 12-player roster to represent Team USA in the FIBA Women's World Cup. In her role as a reserve guard, she posted averages of 7.8 points and 2.2 rebounds per game, while also leading the team with 5.3 assists per game, as Team USA won the gold medal.

== Player profile ==
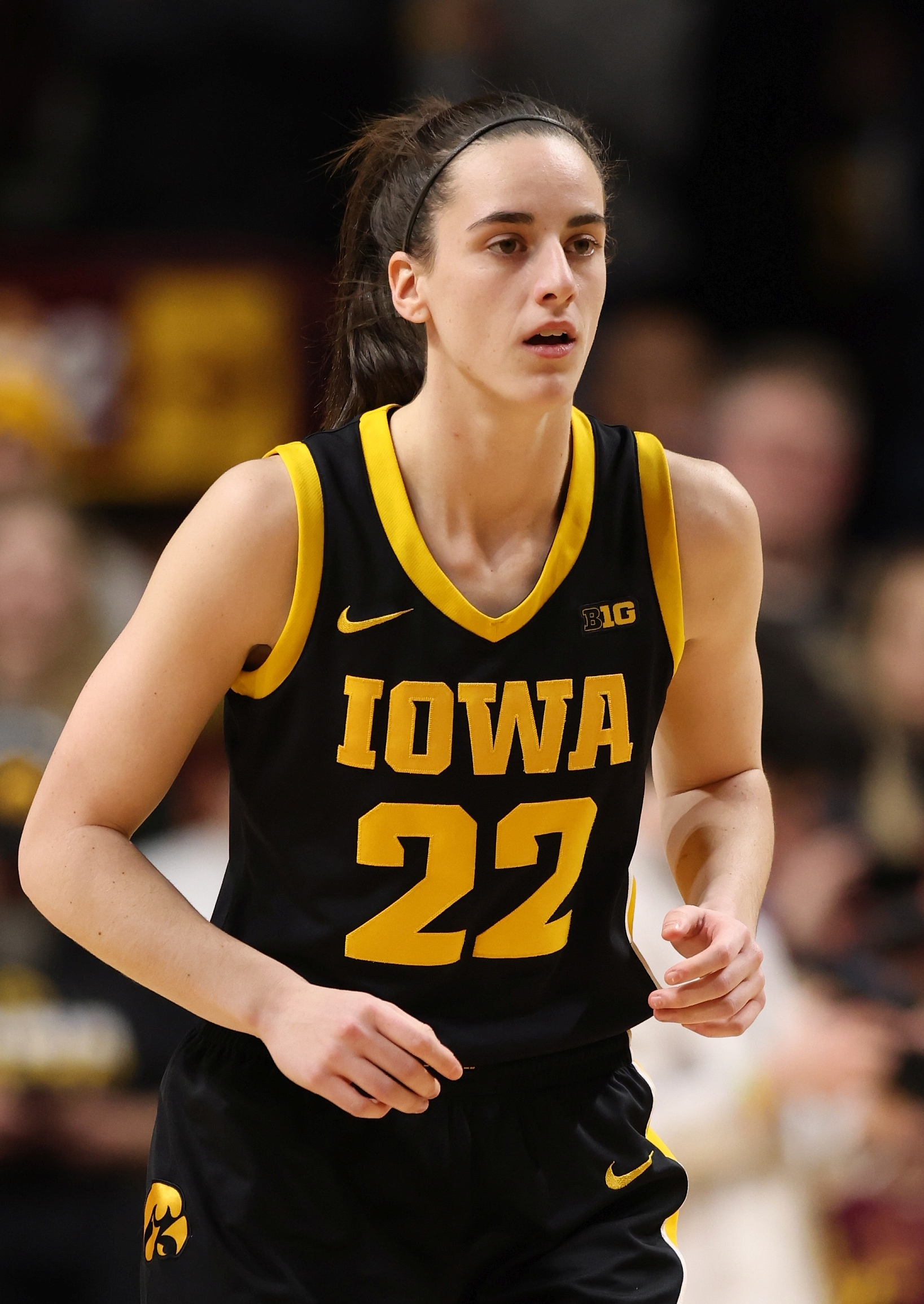
Clark in 2024

Listed at 6 feet 0 inches (1.83 m), Clark plays point guard, and writers have noted her great size for her position. She is praised for her versatility, particularly on offense; The Washington Post columnist Jerry Brewer said that no player in the men's or women's game "checks every offensive box" as distinctly as she does. Clark has the ability to score in the paint, in mid-range and from three-point range. Her shooting range has been lauded by analysts; she often makes shots from well behind the three-point line and with a high degree of difficulty. Her shooting has often drawn comparisons to National Basketball Association (NBA) player Stephen Curry. Analysts have also praised Clark's passing ability, which The Athletic writer Sabreena Merchant described as being "equally audacious" as her shooting. She can pass ahead in transition and find her teammates through defensive traffic. Her combination of scoring and passing skills helps her excel in the pick and roll. Her high turnover rate, in part due to her aggressive style of play and ball-handling usage, has been criticized. Writers have likened Clark's talent and personality to Diana Taurasi. Iowa head coach Lisa Bluder compared her to Sue Bird and Sabrina Ionescu. Clark has modeled parts of her game after Maya Moore, LeBron James, Kevin Durant and Pete Maravich.

== Impact ==
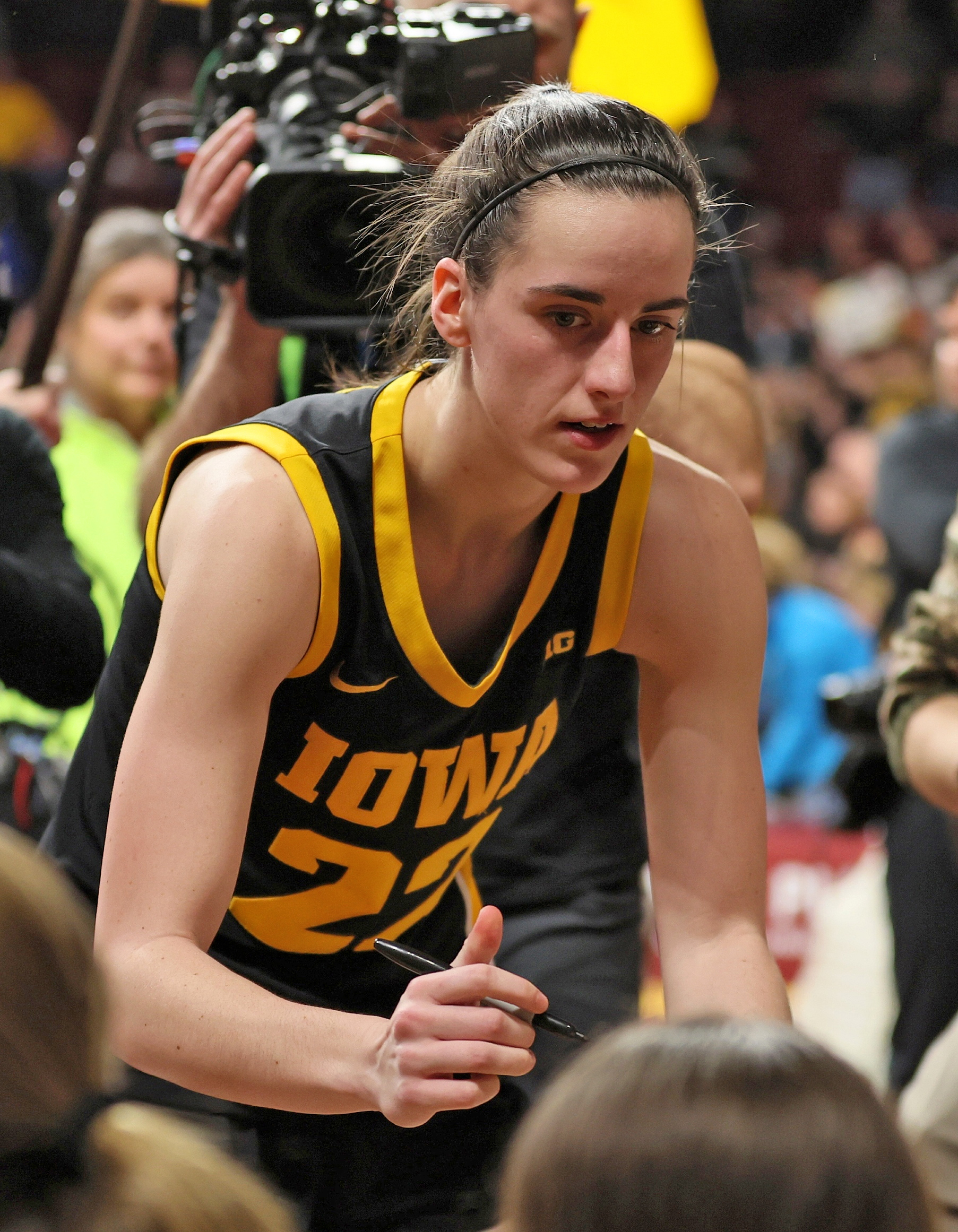
Clark signing autographs after a game in 2024

Widely considered a generational talent, Clark is described as one of the greatest women's college basketball players of all time by many publications. In part due to her unprecedented shooting range and proficiency among female players, she has been labeled a transformative player in women's basketball. Her impact on the women's game is likened to that of Stephen Curry on the men's game. USA Today stated that she, like Curry, has "redefined what a good shot is in basketball". The Wall Street Journal columnist Jason Gay wrote in 2024: "Clark is far from the first great shooter in women's basketball, but she's the one who is changing the dimensionality of the game, because of the distance she can shoot from and how well she can pass."

Clark is credited with popularizing women's basketball since her college career at Iowa, a phenomenon known as the "Caitlin Clark effect". In her senior season, publications attributed a rise in attendance and television viewership for the sport to Clark. As a junior, she helped the 2023 national championship game become the most-viewed women's college basketball game in history (9.9 million). Before her senior season, her team set the women's basketball attendance record (55,646) in a preseason exhibition game. The Iowa women's basketball program sold out its 2023–24 ticket slate and generated $3.26 million in ticket sale revenue, the most in history by a women's college basketball team. At the 2024 NCAA tournament, Clark's final three games each broke the women's college basketball viewership record, culminating with 18.9 million viewers for the national championship game. It was the most-viewed basketball game at any level since 2019 and the first women's NCAA tournament final to draw more viewers than the men's final. In her first WNBA season with the Indiana Fever, she continued to drive historic attendance and viewership. The Fever set a franchise single-season attendance record, and their regular season finale set the league attendance record (20,711).

As Clark drew a larger audience to the WNBA, some players accused members of her fan base of racist, sexist, and homophobic abuse, particularly on social media. Clark has denounced the harassment of players, calling those members of her fan base trolls and not genuine fans. In July 2026, a group of 11 Congressional representatives sent a letter to WNBA Commissioner Cathy Engelbert stating that fouls against Clark may be racially motivated and may warrant a federal investigation of the WNBA.

== Career statistics ==
Legend
GP	Games played	GS	Games started	MPG	Minutes per game	FG%	Field goal percentage
3P%	3-point field goal percentage	FT%	Free throw percentage	RPG	Rebounds per game	APG	Assists per game
SPG	Steals per game	BPG	Blocks per game	TO	Turnovers per game	PPG	Points per game
**Bold**	Career high	*	Led Division I	°	Led the league	‡	WNBA record

=== WNBA ===
==== Regular season ====
WNBA regular season statistics
Year	Team	GP	GS	MPG	FG%	3P%	FT%	RPG	APG	SPG	BPG	TO	PPG
2024	Indiana	**40**°	**40**°	**35.4**	.417	.344	**.906**	**5.7**	8.4°	1.3	**.7**	5.6	19.2
2025	Indiana	13	13	31.1	.367	.279	.820	5.0	**8.8**	**1.6**	.5	5.1	16.5
2026	Indiana	**40**	**40**	31.1	**.445**	**.361**	.852	4.0	8.3	1.1	.5	**4.6**	**22.3**
Career	3 years, 1 team	93	93	32.9	.423	.342	.869	4.8	8.4	1.2	.6	5.1	20.2
Career	All-Star	2	2	23.4	.308	.227	—	2.5	7.5	1.5	.0	3.5	10.5

==== Playoffs ====
WNBA playoff statistics
Year	Team	GP	GS	MPG	FG%	3P%	FT%	RPG	APG	SPG	BPG	TO	PPG
2024	Indiana	2	2	**38.0**	.350	.200	.750	**5.0**	8.5	**2.0**	1.0	**2.5**	18.0
2025	Indiana	Did not play (injury)											
2026	Indiana	**3**	**3**	34.7	**.396**	**.333**	**.875**	4.0	**9.7**	.7	**1.3**	5.7	**20.0**
Career	2 years, 1 team	5	5	36.0	.376	.276	.833	4.4	9.2	1.2	1.2	4.4	19.2

=== College ===
NCAA statistics
Year	Team	GP	GS	MPG	FG%	3P%	FT%	RPG	APG	SPG	BPG	TO	PPG
2020–21	Iowa	30	30	34.0	.472	**.406**	.858	5.9	7.0	1.3	.5	4.8	26.6*
2021–22	Iowa	32	32	**35.9**	.452	.332	**.881**	**8.0**	8.0*	1.5	**.6**	4.8	27.0*
2022–23	Iowa	38	38	34.4	**.473**	.389	.839	7.1	8.6*	1.5	.5	**4.2**	27.8
2023–24	Iowa	**39**	**39**	34.8	.455	.378	.860	7.4	**8.9***	**1.8**	.5	4.7	**31.6***
Career		139	139	34.8	.462	.377	.858	7.1	8.2	1.5	.5	4.8	28.4

== Off the court ==
=== Personal life ===
Clark has been in a relationship with Connor McCaffery, who played basketball and baseball at Iowa, and is the son of the head coach for the University of Pennsylvania’s men's basketball team, Fran McCaffery, since 2023.

Clark was raised in the Catholic Church and is a parishioner at St. Francis of Assisi Catholic Church in Des Moines. Clark majored in marketing at the University of Iowa, graduating in May 2024. Clark is an avid golfer, having played the sport since childhood. She played in the 2023 John Deere Classic Pro-Am alongside professional golfers, Zach Johnson and Ludvig Åberg. In 2024, she played in The ANNIKA with Nelly Korda and Annika Sörenstam, and in the RSM Classic with Zach Johnson. She has purportedly agreed to participate in the 2026 Internet Invitational, a golf event organized by Barstool Sports and Bob Does Sports with an alleged prize of ten million dollars.

She has been a lifelong fan of the Chicago Cubs and has thrown out the first pitch for both the team and its Triple-A affiliate, the Iowa Cubs. She also supports the Kansas City Chiefs and appeared on the ManningCast for a Monday Night Football game featuring the Chiefs in 2023, becoming the first college athlete to appear on the broadcast. In 2026, Clark worked as a sports photographer for the Indiana Pacers. She became a New York Times best-selling author after publishing her debut children's book EXTRAordinary! A Little EXTRA to Reach BIG Dreams.

=== Endorsements and investments ===
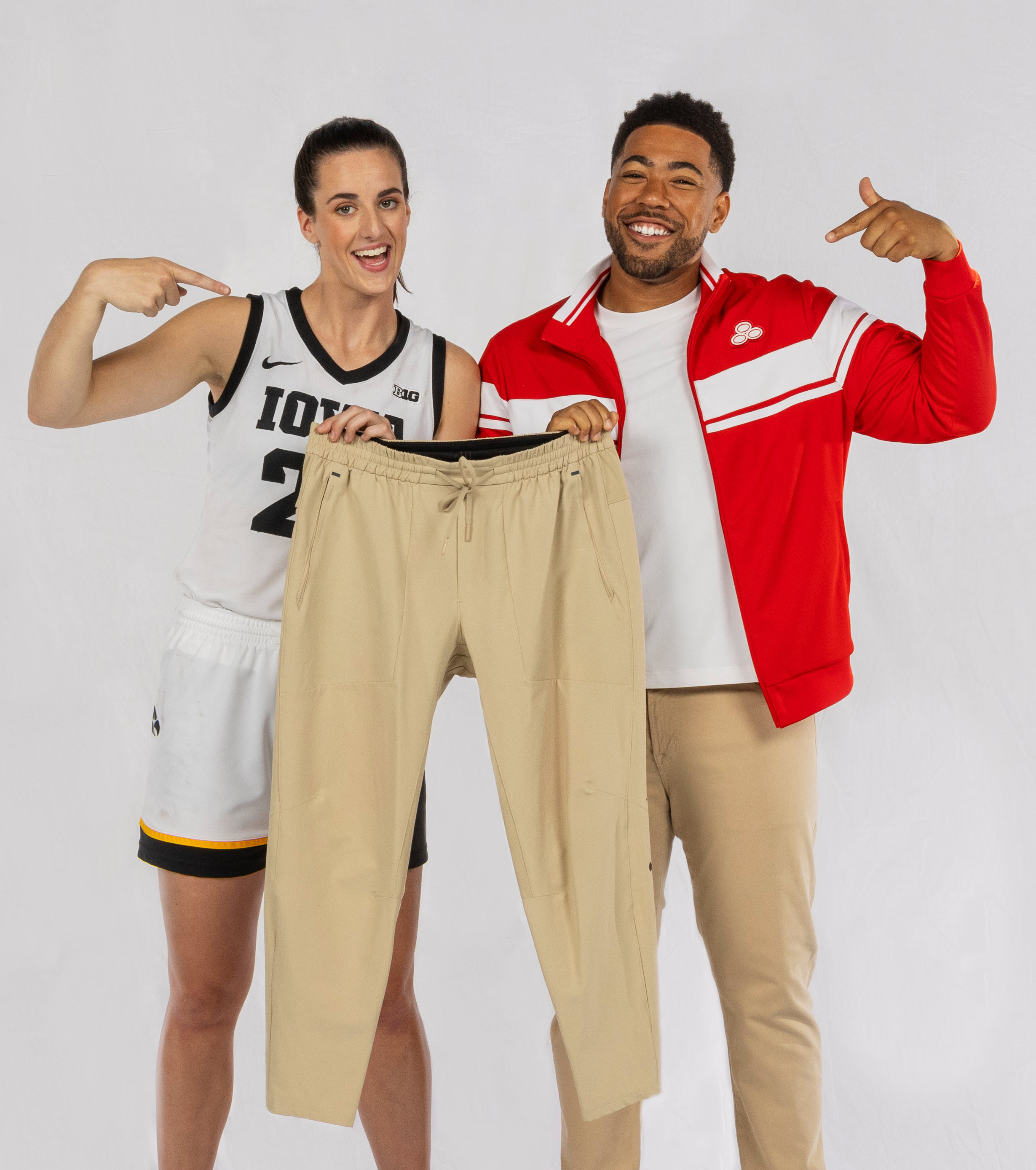
Clark with "Jake from State Farm" (Kevin Miles) in a promotion for State Farm in 2023

Clark is represented by Excel Sports Management, signing with the agency in 2023. She was estimated to be one of the highest-earning college athletes from name, image, and likeness (NIL) deals. By the end of her Iowa career, college sports website On3 estimated her NIL valuation to be $3.4 million, the highest among women's college basketball players and the fourth-highest among college athletes. Companies that signed Clark to NIL deals included Nike, Gatorade, Hy-Vee, Bose, Buick, Goldman Sachs, H&R Block, Shoot-A-Way, and Topps. In 2023, she became the first college athlete to be a spokesperson for State Farm, appearing in national television commercials for the company. In the following year, Hy-Vee released a limited-edition cereal called "Caitlin's Crunch Time" in select stores in Iowa. In April 2025, Hy-Vee released a limited-edition Cool Blue Gatorade bottle, featuring Clark, sold exclusively at Hy-Vee.

In March 2024, Clark became the first female athlete to have an exclusive partnership with Panini, signing a multi-year contract with the trading card company. In the same month, she signed a multiyear sponsorship with Gainbridge, an Indianapolis-based financial platform, joining Billie Jean King and Annika Sörenstam as brand ambassadors. After graduating, she continued her sponsorship deals with Gatorade and Hy-Vee. In May 2024, Clark signed a multi-year deal with Wilson Sporting Goods, becoming the first athlete to release a signature Wilson basketball collection since Michael Jordan, and the first female athlete ever to do so. One of the signature basketballs features phrases from her dream board: "Play in the WNBA" and "Get a basketball scholarship". In August 2025, Clark became the first female athlete to form a multi-year partnership with Stanley.

After she was drafted in April 2024, The Wall Street Journal and The Athletic reported a pending eight-year, $28-million contract between Clark and Nike, which would include a signature shoe deal and would be the largest sponsorship deal ever for a women's basketball player. During the 2024 WNBA Playoffs, Clark debuted the Nike Kobe 5 Protro “Indiana Fever” shoes, designed to match her Fever jerseys. Six months later, Nike announced that this Player Exclusive (PE), called "Caitlin Clark Kobe 5 'Indiana Fever'", would be available for purchase in June 2025 in a limited drop. Her "Indiana Fever" PEs sold out immediately upon release on June 30. In June 2025, Clark debuted another PE with Nike, a Kobe 6 Protro called "The Bellas", in honor of Clark's family dog. The following month, Clark broke out another a Kobe 6 Protro PE, "Cookie Monster", a nod to the Muppet character of the same name. On August 25, 2025, Nike introduced Clark as their newest signature athlete and revealed her signature logo. Her logo apparel collection is to drop in fall 2025 and her signature shoe and apparel collection in 2026.

In November 2024, it was announced that Clark had joined the ownership group intending to bring an expansion National Women's Soccer League team to Cincinnati.

=== Television ===
Clark made a cameo appearance on Saturday Night Live in April 2024. As part of a skit during the Weekend Update segment, she criticized co-anchor Michael Che's past jokes about women's basketball and wrote new jokes for him to read aloud. Clark served as an executive producer on the ESPN+ docuseries Full Court Press, which premiered in May 2024. The series followed three women's college basketball players, including Clark herself, during the 2023–24 season.

On February 9, 2025, Clark appeared in a 90-second Nike commercial in the 2025 Super Bowl featuring some of the world's top female athletes. It was Nike's first Super Bowl ad since 1998.

=== Philanthropy ===
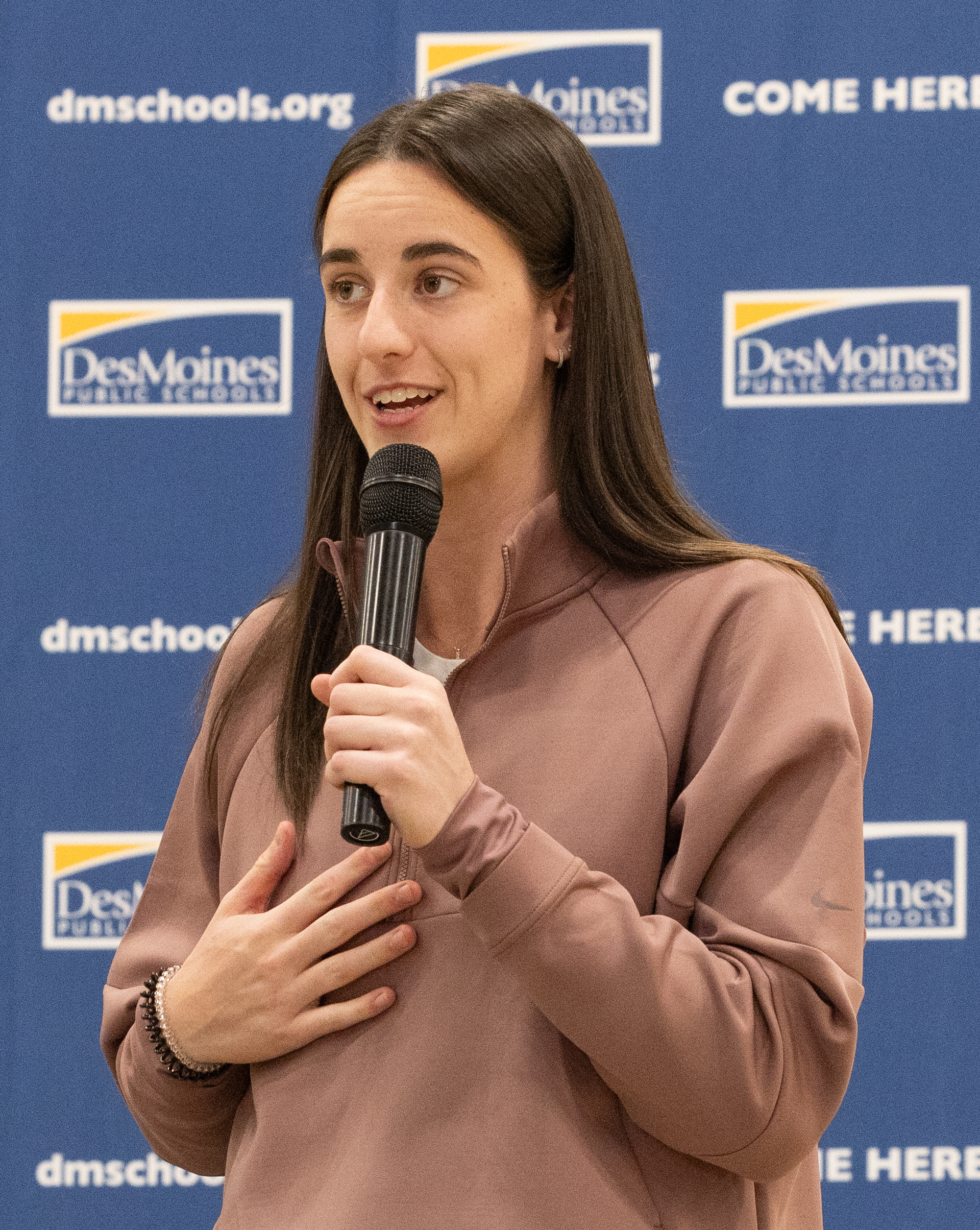
Clark speaking at an event for the Caitlin Clark Foundation in 2024

In March 2022, Clark partnered with the Coralville Community Food Pantry in Coralville, Iowa, for a month-long donation push and meet-and-greet to "Team Up Against Hunger", encouraging $22 donations from the public as a nod to Clark's jersey number. In the first year of this partnership, they raised over $23,000 for the food pantry. A year later, Clark and the Coralville Community Food Pantry teamed up again, this time raising over $75,000 for the nonprofit in thirty days. As of 2024, Clark has helped raise over $100,000 for Coralville Community Food Pantry, and the nonprofit continues to frequently receive $22 donations.

In October 2023, Clark formed the Caitlin Clark Foundation, a nonprofit organization with a mission "to uplift and improve the lives of youth and their communities through education, nutrition, and sport." Beneficiaries from the Caitlin Clark Foundation include University of Iowa Children's Hospital, the Coralville Community Food Pantry, the Boys & Girls Clubs within Iowa, and the Iowa–East Central Special Olympics chapter. Many of Clark's sponsorship and endorsement deals have included pledges of support, monetary donations, or product donations to the Caitlin Clark Foundation, including Gainbridge, Gatorade, Hy-Vee, State Farm, and Wilson Sporting Goods.

In January 2025 on Clark's 23rd birthday, the Caitlin Clark Foundation teamed up with Scholastic and their national literacy program, United States of Readers. Additionally, the foundation announced its plan to donate 22,000 books to under-resourced elementary and middle schools in both Iowa and Indiana through the United States of Readers program. In March 2025, the Caitlin Clark Foundation began a partnership with Musco and introduced the foundation's new "Community Courts Initiative". The foundation announced plans for new Musco Mini-Pitch Systems, multipurpose recreation courts made for sports like soccer, futsal, and basketball, to be installed in four middle schools within the Des Moines Public Schools (DMPS) district. In March 2025, the Caitlin Clark Foundation teamed up with Hy-Vee to raise funds to support childhood nutrition for local food banks across the Midwest via a month-long donation drive. In May 2025, the foundation presented a $300,802 donation to Feeding America at the Food Bank of Iowa from their round-up campaign. The donation is estimated to provide about 3 million meals to food insecure communities in the Midwest via eighteen Feeding America partner food banks.

=== In popular culture ===
In 2023, the Iowa State Fair displayed a life-size butter sculpture of Clark. On February 22, 2024, the Iowa House of Representatives unanimously passed a resolution declaring February 22 as "Caitlin Clark Day" in the state, in reference to her jersey number. In the next month, members of Iowa's federal delegation, including senators Joni Ernst and Chuck Grassley and representative Mariannette Miller-Meeks, introduced a resolution to recognize Clark for breaking the NCAA Division I women's scoring record.

In 2024, an autographed trading card featuring Clark sold for $78,000, the most ever for a women's basketball card. In 2025, an autographed Clark rookie WNBA card was sold for $366,000, surpassing a card of tennis player Serena Williams to become the most expensive women's sports card in history. Later that year, another Clark card was sold for $660,000, again breaking the record.

In 2024, Clark was included in the World's 100 Most Powerful Women list by Forbes, becoming the first basketball player and the second athlete in the past 20 years to appear on the list. In the same year, she was included in the Forbes 30 Under 30 list and the Sports Illustrated Power List. In 2025, Forbes ranked Clark fourth overall, and as the top athlete, in its list of America's Most Powerful Women in Sports.

Clark will be featured on the cover of the September 2026 video game NBA 2K27.

== Filmography ==
Overview of Caitlin Clark film and television credits
Year	Title	Role	Notes
2022	The Bird & Taurasi Show	Herself	Episode: 2022 NCAA Final Four
2023	The B1G Trip	Herself	3 episodes
2023	Manningcast	Herself	Episode: "Philadelphia Eagles at Kansas City Chiefs"
2024	Sue's Places	Herself	Episode: "From the Logo"
2024	Saturday Night Live	Herself	Episode: "Ryan Gosling"
2024	Full Court Press	Herself	4-part docuseries; also executive producer
2024	60 Minutes	Herself	Season 57, Episode 3
2025	The Bird & Taurasi Show	Herself	Episode: 2025 NCAA championship game
2025	My Next Guest Needs No Introduction with David Letterman	Herself	Episode: "Caitlin Clark"
2026	The Tonight Show Starring Jimmy Fallon	Herself	Episode: "November 6, 2026"

== See also ==
- List of career achievements by Caitlin Clark
- List of NCAA Division I basketball career triple-doubles leaders
- List of NCAA Division I women's basketball career scoring leaders
- List of NCAA Division I women's basketball career 3-point scoring leaders
- List of NCAA Division I women's basketball career assists leaders
- List of NCAA Division I women's basketball season scoring leaders
- List of NCAA Division I women's basketball season 3-point field goal leaders
- List of NCAA Division I women's basketball season assists leaders
- Iowa Hawkeyes women's basketball statistical leaders
- List of WNBA regular season records
