= List of career achievements by Caitlin Clark =

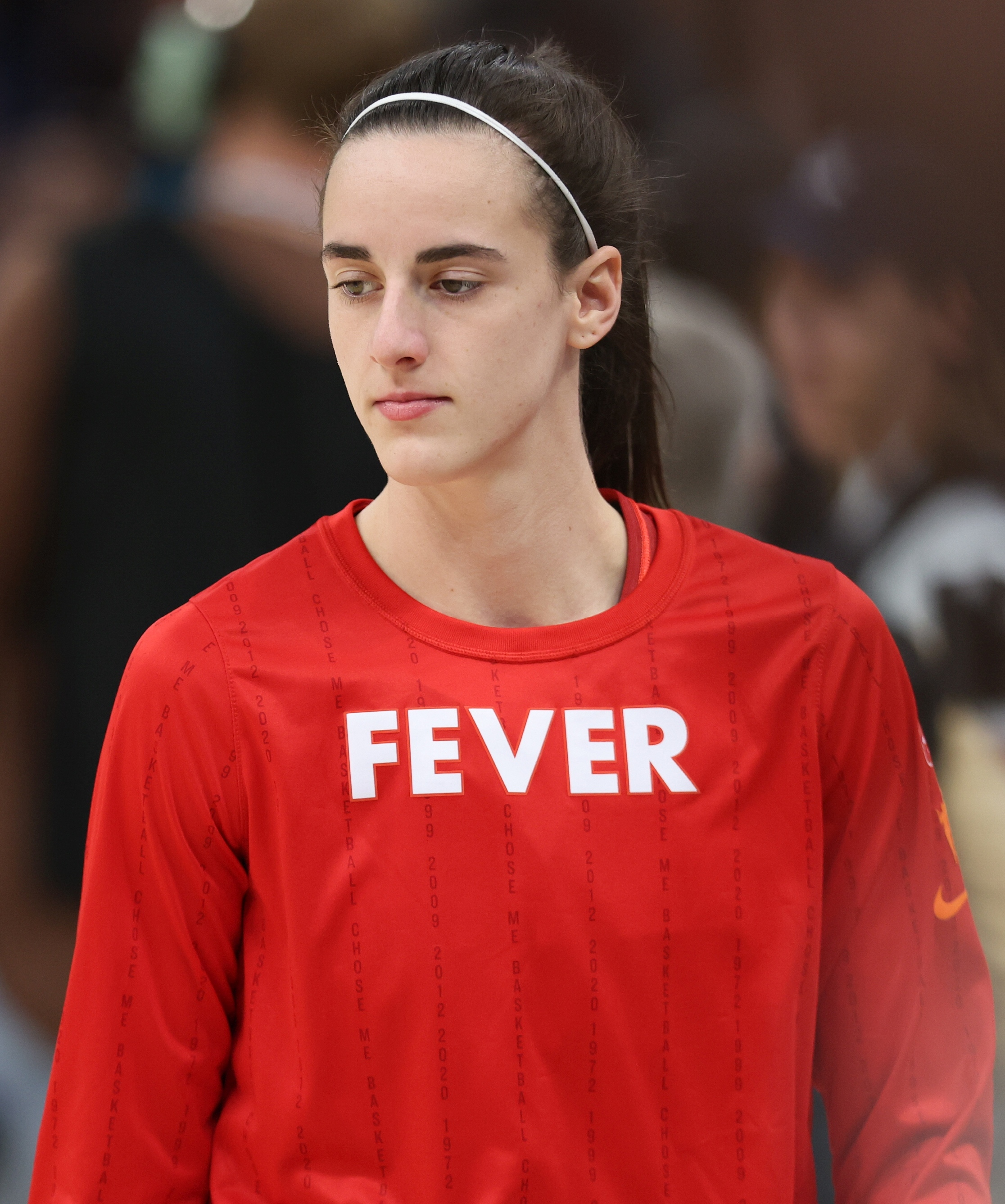
Caitlin Clark in 2024

This page details the records, statistics, and career achievements of American professional basketball player, Caitlin Clark.

== Career statistics ==
Legend
GP	Games played	GS	Games started	MPG	Minutes per game	FG%	Field goal percentage
3P%	3-point field goal percentage	FT%	Free throw percentage	RPG	Rebounds per game	APG	Assists per game
SPG	Steals per game	BPG	Blocks per game	TO	Turnovers per game	PPG	Points per game
**Bold**	Career high	*	Led Division I	°	Led the league	‡	WNBA record

=== WNBA ===
==== Regular season ====
WNBA regular season statistics
Year	Team	GP	GS	MPG	FG%	3P%	FT%	RPG	APG	SPG	BPG	TO	PPG
2024	Indiana	**40**°	**40**°	**35.4**	.417	.344	**.906**	**5.7**	8.4°	1.3	**.7**	5.6	19.2
2025	Indiana	13	13	31.1	.367	.279	.820	5.0	**8.8**	**1.6**	.5	5.1	16.5
2026	Indiana	**40**	**40**	31.1	**.445**	**.361**	.852	4.0	8.3	1.1	.5	**4.6**	**22.3**
Career	3 years, 1 team	93	93	32.9	.423	.342	.869	4.8	8.4	1.2	.6	5.1	20.2
Career	All-Star	2	2	23.4	.308	.227	—	2.5	7.5	1.5	.0	3.5	10.5

==== Playoffs ====
WNBA playoff statistics
Year	Team	GP	GS	MPG	FG%	3P%	FT%	RPG	APG	SPG	BPG	TO	PPG
2024	Indiana	2	2	**38.0**	.350	.200	.750	**5.0**	8.5	**2.0**	1.0	**2.5**	18.0
2025	Indiana	Did not play (injury)											
2026	Indiana	**3**	**3**	34.7	**.396**	**.333**	**.875**	4.0	**9.7**	.7	**1.3**	5.7	**20.0**
Career	2 years, 1 team	5	5	36.0	.376	.276	.833	4.4	9.2	1.2	1.2	4.4	19.2

=== College ===
NCAA statistics
Year	Team	GP	GS	MPG	FG%	3P%	FT%	RPG	APG	SPG	BPG	TO	PPG
2020–21	Iowa	30	30	34.0	.472	**.406**	.858	5.9	7.0	1.3	.5	4.8	26.6*
2021–22	Iowa	32	32	**35.9**	.452	.332	**.881**	**8.0**	8.0*	1.5	**.6**	4.8	27.0*
2022–23	Iowa	38	38	34.4	**.473**	.389	.839	7.1	8.6*	1.5	.5	**4.2**	27.8
2023–24	Iowa	**39**	**39**	34.8	.455	.378	.860	7.4	**8.9***	**1.8**	.5	4.7	**31.6***
Career		139	139	34.8	.462	.377	.858	7.1	8.2	1.5	.5	4.8	28.4

=== FIBA ===
==== Youth ====
Caitlin Clark youth FIBA statistics
Year	Team	GP	GS	MPG	FG%	3P%	FT%	RPG	APG	SPG	BPG	TO	PPG
2017	United States U-16	5	0	14.4	.366	**.385**	.667	2.2	2.2	**1.4**	0.4	**0.8**	8.8
2019	United States U-19	**7**	0	14.7	.333	.250	**.800**	1.3	1.6	1.1	0.1	0.9	5.3
2021	United States U-19	**7**	**7**	**25.1**	**.386**	.364	.727	**5.3**	**5.6**	1.0	**0.9**	2.4	**14.3**
**Career**		19	7	18.1	.368	.346	.736	3.0	3.2	1.2	0.5	1.4	9.5

==== Senior ====
Stats current as of game on March 17, 2026

Caitlin Clark senior FIBA statistics
Year	Team	GP	GS	MPG	FG%	3P%	FT%	RPG	APG	SPG	BPG	TO	PPG
2026	United States	5	1	21.2	.529	.400	.857	1.6	6.4	0.8	0.4	2.6	11.6
**Career**		5	1	21.2	.529	.400	.857	1.6	6.4	0.8	0.4	2.6	11.6

== Awards and honors ==
=== WNBA ===
- 3× WNBA All-Star: 2024–2026
- 2× All-WNBA First Team: 2024, 2026
- WNBA All-Star Team Captain: 2025
- WNBA Commissioner's Cup Champion: 2025
- WNBA Assists Leader: 2024
- WNBA Peak Performer – Assists: 2024
- WNBA Rookie of the Year: 2024
- WNBA All-Rookie Team: 2024
- AP All-WNBA Team: 2024
- AP Rookie of the Year: 2024
- AP All-Rookie Team: 2024
- 7× WNBA Player of the Week
- 2× WNBA Player of the Month (Note: Clark was the first rookie in WNBA history to earn the "Player of the Month" award.): August 2024; June 2026
- 4× WNBA Rookie of the Month: 2024

=== NCAA ===
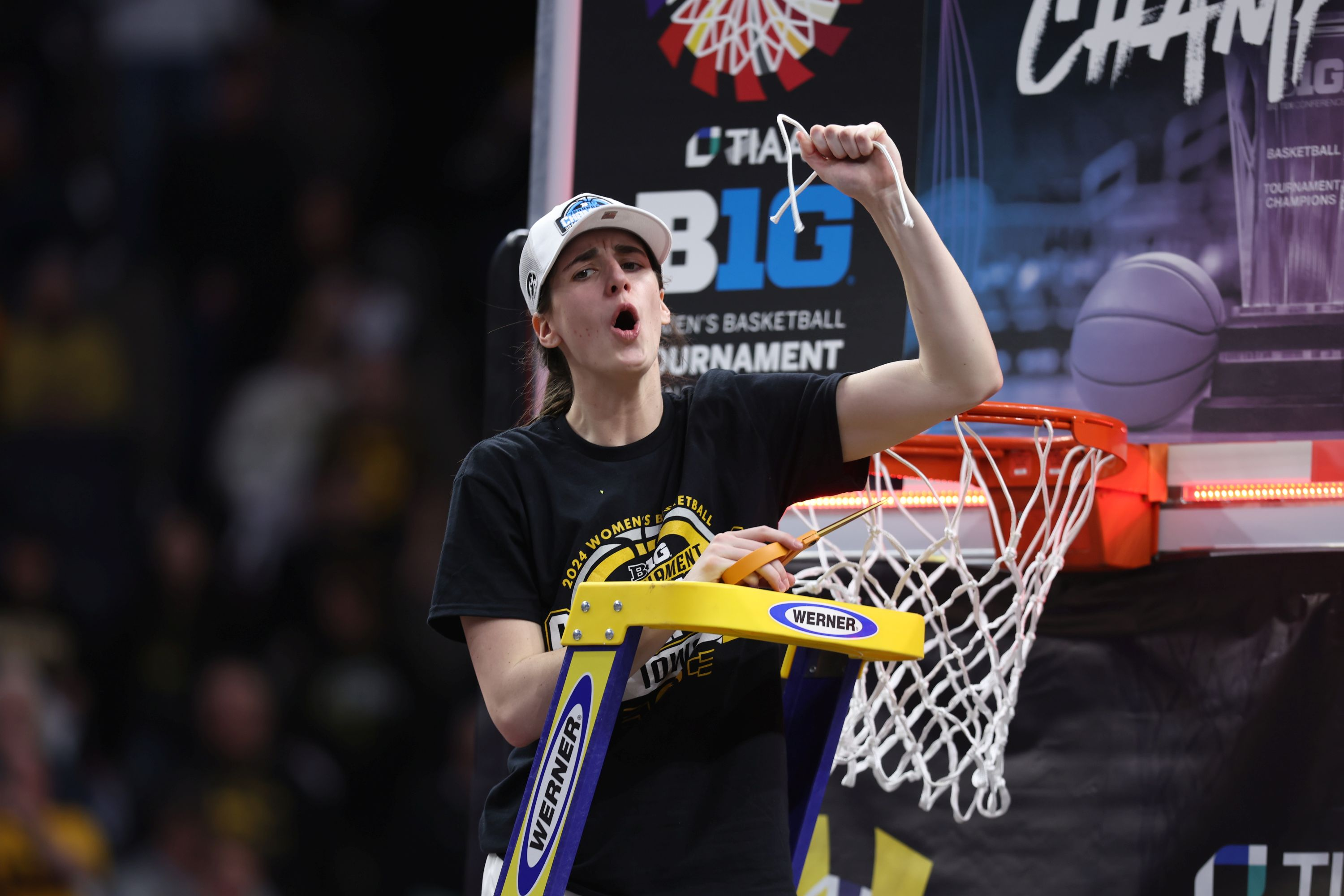
Clark cutting down the net after winning the 2024 Big Ten women's basketball tournament.

- No. 22 retired by Iowa Hawkeyes
- 2-time AP Player of the Year: 2023, 2024
- 2-time Honda Sports Award winner: 2023, 2024
- 2-time Honda-Broderick Cup winner: 2023, 2024
- 2-time Naismith College Player of the Year: 2023, 2024
- 2-time John R. Wooden Award winner: 2023, 2024
- 2-time Wade Trophy winner: 2023, 2024
- 2-time Ann Meyers Drysdale Award winner: 2023, 2024
- 3-time Nancy Lieberman Award winner: 2022, 2023, 2024
- 3-time Dawn Staley Award winner: 2021, 2022, 2023
- 4-time First-team USBWA All-American: 2021, 2022, 2023, 2024
- 4-time WBCA All-American: 2021, 2022, 2023, 2024
- 3-time unanimous First-team All-American: 2022, 2023, 2024
- 3-time First-team AP All-American: 2022, 2023, 2024
- Tamika Catchings Award winner (Note: Shared with Paige Bueckers): 2021
- WBCA Freshman of the Year: 2021
- Second-team AP All-American: 2021
- 2-time NCAA Final Four All-Tournament Team: 2023, 2024
- 3-time NCAA Division I scoring leader: 2021, 2022, 2024
- 3-time NCAA Division I assists leader: 2022, 2023, 2024
- 2-time NCAA Division I three-point leader: 2023, 2024

==== Big Ten Conference ====
- 2-time Big Ten Female Athlete of the Year: 2023, 2024
- 3-time Big Ten Player of the Year: 2022, 2023, 2024
- 3-time Big Ten tournament MOP: 2022, 2023, 2024
- 3-time Big Ten tournament champion: 2022, 2023, 2024
- 4-time First-team All-Big Ten: 2021, 2022, 2023, 2024
- 4-time Big Ten All-Tournament Team: 2021, 2022, 2023, 2024
- Big Ten Freshman of the Year: 2021
- Big Ten All-Freshman Team: 2021

==== Academics ====
- 2-time Division I Academic All-American of the Year: 2023, 2024
- 2-time Division I Women's Basketball Academic All-American of the Year: 2023, 2024
- 3-time First-team Academic All-American: 2022, 2023, 2024

=== FIBA ===
- FIBA Under-16 Americas Championship gold medalist: 2017
- 2× FIBA Under-19 World Cup gold medalist: 2019, 2021
- FIBA Under-19 World Cup Most Valuable Player: 2021
- FIBA Under-19 World Cup All-Star Five: 2021
- FIBA Women's Basketball World Cup gold medalist: 2026

=== High school ===
- McDonald's All-American: 2020
- Iowa Miss Basketball: 2020
- 2-time Iowa Gatorade Player of the Year: 2019, 2020
- The Des Moines Register All-Iowa Athlete of the Year: 2020
- 3-time IPSWA Class 5A First-team All-State: 2018, 2019, 2020
- INA Class 5A Third-team All-State: 2017

=== Media ===
- The Sporting News Athlete of the Year: 2023 (Note: Shared with Angel Reese), 2024 (Note: Named Female Athlete of the Year)
- Best Female College Athlete ESPY Award: 2023; 2024
- Best Record-Breaking Performance ESPY Award: 2024 (Note: Nominated for "Caitlin Clark becomes NCAA's all time scoring leader breaking Pete Maravich's record.")
- TIME Athlete of the Year: 2024
- AP Female Athlete of the Year: 2024
- Forbes The World’s 100 Most Powerful Women: 2024
- Forbes 30 Under 30: 2024
- Sports Business Journal Brand Activation of the Year: 2025
- Best WNBA Player ESPY Award: 2025
- AP Greatest Women’s Collegiate Basketball Players: 2025
- TIME 100 Most Influential People in Sports: 2026

=== Hall(s) of Fame ===
- Dowling Catholic Hall of Fame: Class of 2025

=== Other ===
- Nike Elite Youth Basketball League champion: 2018
- 2-time James E. Sullivan Award winner: 2022, 2023

== Records ==
=== WNBA ===
Stats current through end of 2024 WNBA season

- Points

- Season, rookie: 769 (2024)

- Assists

- Season: 337 (2024)
- Game: 19 (July 17, 2024 at Dallas)

- Three-pointers

- Season, rookie: 122 (2024)
- Game, rookie: 7 (June 7, 2024 at Washington)

- Triple-doubles

- Season, rookie: 2 (2024)

- Turnovers

- Season: 223 (2024)
- Game, rookie debut: 10 (May 14, 2024 at Connecticut)

- Miscellaneous

- Most All-Star fan votes in league history: 1,293,526 (2025)
- Most career games with 20+ points & 10+ assists: 12

=== Indiana Fever ===
- Points

- Season: 769 (2024)
- Game, rookie: 35 (September 15, 2024, vs. Dallas)
- Game: 45 (July 17, 2026 vs Seattle)

- Three-pointers

- Season: 122 (2024)

- Triple-doubles

- Career: 3

- Double-doubles

- Season: 14 (2024)

=== NCAA Division I ===
- Points

- Career: 3,951
- Career, NCAA tournament: 491
- Season: 1,234 (2023–24)

- Assists

- Career, NCAA tournament: 152

- Three-pointers

- Career: 548
- Career, NCAA tournament: 78
- Season: 201 (2023–24)
- Game, NCAA tournament: 9 (April 1, 2024, vs. LSU)

- Field goals

- Career: 1,293

- Miscellaneous

- First player to lead Division I in points and assists in the same season (2022, 2024)

=== Iowa Hawkeyes ===
- Points

- Career: 3,951
- Season: 1,234 (2023–24)
- Game: 49 (February 15, 2024, vs. Michigan)

- Assists

- Career: 1,144
- Season: 346 (2023–24)
- Game: 18 (January 25, 2022, vs. Penn State)

- Three-pointers

- Career: 548
- Season: 201 (2023–24)

- Free throws

- Career: 817
- Season: 239 (2022–23)
