= List of schools of the Roman Catholic Diocese of Des Moines =

This is a list of schools of the Roman Catholic Diocese of Des Moines.

== Tertiary ==
- Mercy College of Health Sciences

== K-12 schools ==
School	Location	Mascot
Saint Albert Catholic Schools	Council Bluffs	Falcons

== High schools ==
School	Location	Mascot
Dowling Catholic High School	West Des Moines	Maroons

== K-8 schools ==
- St. Luke the Evangelist Catholic School (Ankeny)
  - St. Luke the Evangelist Catholic School was opened in August 2015 by the diocese on the western side of Ankeny at 1102 NW Weigel on a 35-acre (14 ha) plot of land. The initial school and church building had a cost of $8.2 million. Dr. The school initially housed K-3rd grade students. Each year following, a new grade is added until it serves K-8th grade students in 2020. On October 21, 2021 a groundbreaking was held for an expansion with a cost of $3.5 million, with $3.2 million paid through cash and gifts.
- St. Malachy School (Creston)
- Des Moines
  - Christ the King School
  - Holy Trinity School
  - St. Anthony School
  - St. Augustin School
  - St. Joseph School
  - St. Theresa School
- St. Patrick School (Perry)
  - The school was dedicated on February 21, 1921.
- St. Pius X School (Urbandale)
  - It opened with an initial 120 students in September 1956. Initially its facility was one story tall and had eight classrooms, but an additional eight classrooms were added after construction began on another section on May 1, 1962. That section had two stories. The area Catholic high school is Dowling Catholic High School in West Des Moines.
- West Des Moines
  - Sacred Heart School
  - St. Francis of Assisi School - Opened in fall 2000

== Elementary schools ==
- Shelby County Catholic School (Harlan)

== Former schools ==
Former High Schools

School	Location	Mascot	Fate
Assumption	Granger	Tigers	Absorbed by Dowling Catholic, West Des Moines in 1966
St. Joseph's	Dunlap	Shamrocks/Royals	Closed in 1961
SS Peter and Paul	Defiance	Trojans	Closed in 1967
St. Boniface	Westphalia	Trotters	Merged with St. Paul's, Defiance, becoming SS Peter and Paul, Defiance in 1964
St. Joseph's	Earling	Eagles	Closed in 1967
St. Joseph's	Neola	Rockets	Consolidated with St. Francis, Council Bluffs to form St. Albert's, Council Bluffs in 1964
St. Mary's, Panama-Portsmouth	Portsmouth	Knights	Closed in 1967
St. Patrick Academy	Imogene	Shamrocks	Closed in 1969
St. Patrick's	Perry	Knights	Closed in 1966

Former K-8 schools

- Assumption School (Granger) - Circa 2013 it had about 82-92 students. In 2016 that was down to 62. In addition to the enrollment drop, the school's expenses grew. The school closed in 2016.
- Holy Family School (Des Moines)
