= List of NCAA Division I women's basketball season 3-point field goal leaders =

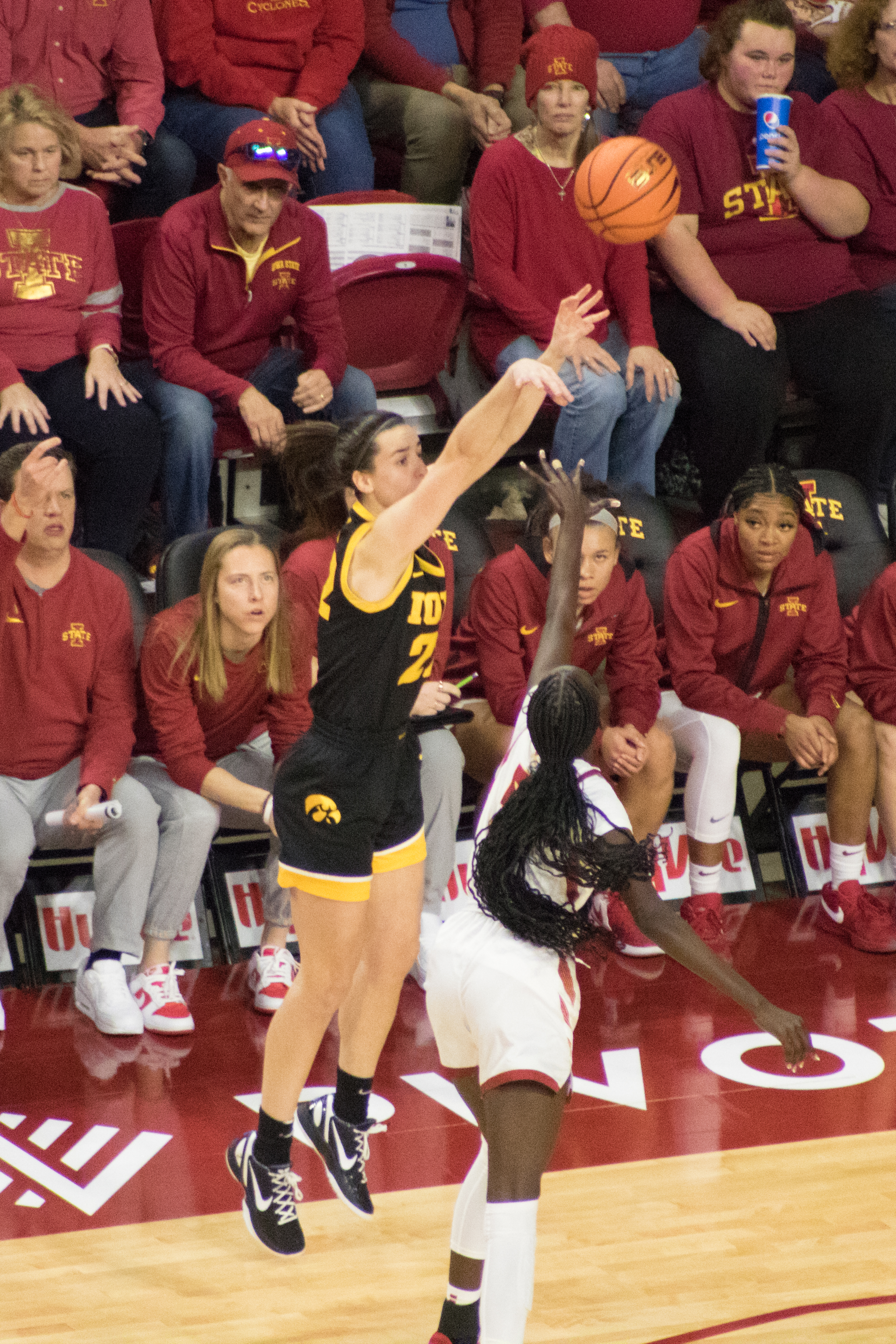
Caitlin Clark became the first player in NCAA history to make 200 3-pointers in a season.

A three-point field goal (also known as a "three-pointer" or "3-pointer") is a field goal in a basketball game, made from beyond the three-point line, a designated arc radiating from the basket. A successful attempt is worth three points, in contrast to the two points awarded for shots made inside the three-point line. The National Collegiate Athletic Association (NCAA) keeps records of the Division I 3-point field goal makes per game (3PG) average annual leaders. The statistic was first recognized in Division I women's basketball in the 1987–88 season, when the NCAA made the three-pointer a mandatory feature throughout women's basketball. From the 1987–88 season through the 2007–08 men's season, the three-point perimeter was marked at 19 ft 9 in (6.02 m) for both men's and women's college basketball. After the 2007–08 season, the NCAA moved the men's three-point line back to 20 ft 9 in (6.32 m), while the women's line remained the same. The women's line would be moved back to match the men's line effective with the 2011–12 season. On June 5, 2019, the NCAA men's rules committee voted to extend the men's three-point line to the FIBA distance of 6.75 meters (22 ft 2 in), effective in 2019–20 in Division I and 2020–21 in lower NCAA divisions. The women's line remained at 20 ft 9 in until being moved to the FIBA arc in 2021–22.

NCAA record books list single-season three-point record holders both on overall and per-game bases, but the official season leaders are based solely on per-game average. Caitlin Clark holds both records for single-season three-point scoring, making 201 threes and averaging 5.15 per game during her final season at Iowa in 2023–24. Both records had previously been held by Taylor Pierce of Idaho, with 154 threes and an average of 4.53 per game in 2018–19. Clark, who also led Division I in threes per game in 2022–23, is also the all-time leader in career threes, with 548 from 2020–21 to 2023–24. The player with the highest 3PG average over the span of her entire career (with a minimum of 150 made threes) is Alabama State's Lisa McMullen, who made 4.00 per game over two years.

== Key ==
Pos.	G	F	C	3PG
Position	Guard	Forward	Center	3-pointers per game

Class (Cl.) key
Fr	Freshman	So	Sophomore	Jr	Junior	Sr	Senior

Player (X)	Denotes the number of times the player had been the 3-point leader up to and including that season

== 3-point field goals per game ==
Season	Player	Pos.	Cl.	Team	Games played	3-point field goals	3PG
1987–88	Gwen Davis	G	Jr	Bethune–Cookman	26	111	4.27
1988–89	Marguerite Moran	G	Sr	Hofstra	29	107	3.69
1989–90	Sandi Bittler	G	Sr	Princeton	22	89	4.05
1990–91	Lisa McMullen	G	Jr	Alabama State	28	126	4.5
1991–92	Lynda Kukla	G	Sr	Valparaiso	27	101	3.74
1992–93	Suzie Dailer	G	So	St. Bonaventure	27	99	3.67
1993–94	Autumn Hollyfield	G	Jr	Cal State Fullerton	27	110	4.07
1994–95	Cornelia Gayden	G	Sr	LSU	27	105	3.89
1995–96	Tara Gunderson	G	Jr	Iowa State	27	93	3.44
1996–97	Brenna Doty	G	Sr	Buffalo	28	98	3.5
1997–98	Julie Krommenhoek	G	Sr	Utah	27	98	3.63
1998–99	Courtney Banghart	G	Jr	Dartmouth	28	97	3.46
1999–00	Shrieka Evans	G	Fr	Grambling	30	120	4
2000–01	Shrieka Evans (2)	G	So	Grambling	29	111	3.83
2001–02	Laurie Koehn	G	Fr	Kansas State	34	122	3.59
2002–03	Amy Waugh	G	Sr	Xavier	30	107	3.57
2003–04	Joy Gallagher	G	So	Wagner	28	99	3.54
2004–05	Jenny Conkle	G	Jr	Belmont	28	87	3.11
2005–06	Toni Kennedy	G	Sr	Maryland Eastern Shore	29	100	3.45
2006–07	Chelsey Warburton	G	Sr	Weber State	31	103	3.32
2007–08	Sade Logan	G	Jr	Robert Morris	33	126	3.82
2008–09	Kristi Dini	G	Sr	Boston University	33	109	3.3
2009–10	Chynna Bozeman	G	Jr	Montana State	33	121	3.67
2010–11	Katie Tull	G	So	Charleston	30	107	3.57
2011–12	Diana Choibekova	G	Jr	Winthrop	31	121	3.9
2012–13	Morgan Eye	G	So	Missouri	32	112	3.5
2013–14	Kyndal Clark	G	Jr	Drake	32	116	3.63
2014–15	Melissa Dixon	G	Sr	Iowa	34	124	3.65
2015–16	Kiyanna Black	G	Sr	Ohio	33	126	3.82
2016–17	Tori Jankoska	G	Sr	Michigan State	33	122	3.70
2017–18	Toshua Levitt	G	Jr	Texas State	31	137	4.42
2018–19	Taylor Pierce	G	Sr	Idaho	34	154	4.53
2019–20	Taylor Robertson	G	So	Oklahoma	30	131	4.37
2020–21	Sydney Wagner	G	Jr	William & Mary	13 (Note: Due to the effects of COVID-19 on teams' abilities to play full regular-season schedules, the NCAA allowed for a lower games played requirement to be the season 3FGM leader. Specifically, the NCAA used a threshold of 13 games played, which was the minimum number of regular-season contests required for a team to be eligible to play in the 2021 NCAA tournament.)	51	3.92
2021–22	Taylor Robertson (2)	G	Sr	Oklahoma	34	124	3.65
2022–23	Caitlin Clark	G	Jr	Iowa	38	140	3.68
2023–24	Caitlin Clark (2)	G	Sr	Iowa	39	201	5.15
2024–25	Alyssa Durazo-Frescas	G	Sr	Grand Canyon	30	124	4.13

== Multiple-time leaders ==
Rank	Player	Team	Times leader	Years
1	Caitlin Clark	Iowa	2	2022–23, 2023–24
1	Shrieka Evans	Grambling	2	1999–00, 2000–01
1	Taylor Pierce	Idaho	2	2018–19, 2019–20
