= Dream board =

Collage used for inspiration or motivation

A dream board or vision board is a collage of images, pictures, and affirmations of one's hopes and dreams for the future, designed to serve as a source of inspiration and motivation. The usefulness of vision boards has been endorsed by celebrities such as Oprah Winfrey, Steve Harvey, and John Pierre. The author Octavia E. Butler wrote prose affirmations into her notebook, in what is seen by some as a prototype of the modern vision board.

== Criticism ==
However, there is some evidence that vision boards may be counterproductive, since continually fantasizing about success can lead to taking fewer actions to realizing it. Thus, an "action board" is sometimes viewed as a better alternative or accompaniment.
