= Saint Albert Catholic Schools =

Private, Roman Catholic school in Council Bluffs, Iowa, United States

Location
- 400 Gleason Avenue; Council Bluffs, (Pottawattamie County), Iowa 51503; United States; 41°15′43″N 95°49′21″W

Information
- Type: Private, Coeducational
- Religious affiliation: Roman Catholic
- Established: 1964
- Superintendent: Donna Bishop
- Head of school: Anne Rohling
- Faculty: 29.4 (on FTE basis)
- Grades: K–12
- Student to teacher ratio: 11.9:1
- Colors: Green and Gold
- Athletics conference: Hawk 10
- Team name: Falcons & Saintes
- Accreditation: North Central Association of Colleges and Schools
- Newspaper: The Accipiter
- Website: www.saintalbertschools.org

Saint Albert Catholic Schools is a private, Roman Catholic K-12 school in Council Bluffs, Iowa, United States. Saint Albert's mascot is a falcon for the boys, while the girls are known as the saintes. It is located in the Roman Catholic Diocese of Des Moines.

In addition to Council Bluffs it takes students from Glenwood, Neola, and Missouri Valley. Additionally it takes students from portions of Nebraska.

== Background ==
Saint Albert, located on Gleason Avenue, was dedicated on June 7, 1964. It replaced Saint Francis, Mount Loretto, and St. Joseph High Schools. In 1969 three elementary schools, St. Francis, St. Patrick, and St. Peter consolidated into St. Albert's Schools, as did the remainder of the archdiocese's elementary schools in Council Bluffs in 1972.

In 1972 the consolidated school system had multiple campuses. the Holy Family building, the Queen of Apostles building, and the Gleason building housing Kindergarten to grade 3, grades 4–6, and grades 7–12, respectively. In 1987 the grades K-3 were moved to the former DeForest Elementary School, which Saint Albert purchased from the Council Bluffs Community School District. The middle school grades moved to the Gleason Avenue campus in 1999. Elementary grades moved to the Gleason Avenue campus in 2009.

== Athletics ==
- Boys' 2-time Class 1A Cross Country State Champions (2011, 2012)
- 2021 Class 1A Baseball State Champions
- Girls' 2025 Class 1A Basketball State Champions
- Girls' Track and Field Team State Champions- 1981 (2A), 2000 (1A), 2025 (1A)
