= Musco Lighting =

American lighting manufacturer

Musco Sports Lighting, LLC
- Type: Private
- Genre: Sports lighting, mobile lighting, motion picture lighting, event lighting, and industrial lighting
- Founded: 1976
- Headquarters: Oskaloosa, Iowa, United States
- Area served: Worldwide
- Website: musco.com

Musco Lighting, often referred to as Musco, is a privately-held company that specializes designs and manufactures sports lighting, transportation and infrastructure lighting, automated sports broadcasting, and modular sports venue products. The company's headquarters are in Oskaloosa, Iowa, with manufacturing plants in Muscatine, Iowa; Incheon, South Korea; and Shanghai, China. Musco also has offices throughout North America, Europe, Central America, the Middle East, and Australia.

== History ==
=== 1980s ===
Entering the 1980s, Musco worked to improve its SportsCluster system, while developing a mobile sports lighting product. In 1980, the team tested its original mobile lighting system at the University of Iowa's Kinnick Stadium. Two years later, executives from ABC Sports, who had been at the system's test in Iowa City, contacted Musco about utilizing the company's mobile lighting at Notre Dame Stadium for a game the following season between the University of Notre Dame and the University of Michigan.

Throughout the 1980s, Musco's mobile lighting system, which was named the Musco Light, was used at other venues, events, and on the production sets of motion pictures, including All the Right Moves.

Later in the decade, Musco introduced the SportsCluster2 system, along with new technologies designed to reduce glare including its Level-8 and Total Light Control products. The company began work on a complete-system approach, in which it would oversee the manufacturing of its own poles and pre-cast concrete base. Other events that featured Musco's lighting that decade included the 1983 Super Bowl, the 1984 Olympic Games, and the rededication ceremony for the Statue of Liberty.

=== 1990s ===
The company's Light-Structure System was installed at Howard J. Lamade Stadium in Williamsport, Pennsylvania, for the 1992 Little League World Series. This led to a partnership between Musco and Little League Baseball and Softball focused on player safety initiatives.

Also in 1991, Musco was contacted by NASCAR to develop a lighting system for a race the following year at Charlotte Motor Speedway. It would be the first night race in NASCAR history. To help development of the system, Musco built a 50:1 scale model of the track at its manufacturing plant in Iowa, and company co-founder Myron Gordin enrolled in the Richard Petty NASCAR driving school to witness the demands of sight lines at high speeds. The project led to the creation of Musco's Mirtran system, which featured lights that were aimed away from the track onto secondary, ground-level mirrors that bounced the light back onto the racing surface. The project earned Musco an IES Illumination Award for Outdoor Lighting Design by the Illuminating Engineering Society.

Throughout the 1990s, Musco's Mirtran technology was installed at other NASCAR tracks, including Richmond Raceway, Bristol Motor Speedway, Las Vegas Motor Speedway, and Daytona International Speedway. The decade also brought about the company's first global expansion, with a lighting system installed at Dunstall Park Wolverhampton Racecourse in England. Queen Elizabeth II attended the unveiling event and dedicated the new lighting at the track.

In 1995 when the Alfred P. Murrah Federal Building in Oklahoma City, Oklahoma, was bombed in a domestic terror attack, members of Musco's mobile lighting team were dispatched to the site.

=== 2000s ===
On September 11, 2001, after the terrorist attacks at the World Trade Center and the Pentagon, several of Musco's mobile lighting trucks assisted with rescue and recovery efforts at both sites.

In 2006, Musco started the development of a lighting system to be donated for use at the Washington Monument, adapting its Mirtan technology to be applied vertically to illuminate the monument's façade.

In 2008 Musco started research and development on the utilization of light emitting diodes (LED) as a light source for sports fields and other large outdoor applications. Later that year, Musco donated a custom LED system for use in lighting the façade of the White House.

At the close of the decade, Musco installed Mirtran systems at Losail International Circuit in Qatar and Yas Marina Circuit in Abu Dhabi.

=== 2010s ===
In 2010, Musco partnered with the National Park Service in the construction of a Flight 93 National Memorial in Shanksville, Pennsylvania, donating lighting systems for the Memorial Plaza, public areas, and paneled wall inscribed with the names of the passengers and crew of United Flight 93.

Also in 2010, Musco engineered a lighting system using LED light source technology to be installed at the East Span of the San Francisco-Oakland Bay Bridge.

In 2013, Musco installed an LED sports lighting system at Arizona State University's Wells Fargo Arena. Over the next few years the company would install LED systems at LakePoint Sporting Community in Emerson, Georgia; NRG Stadium in Houston, Texas; Petco Park in San Diego, California; Daikin Park in Houston, Texas; and at Twickenham Stadium. and Emirates Stadium

In 2017, TLC for LED systems were installed at three Major League Baseball stadiums, four National Football League stadiums, and four National Basketball Association/National Hockey League arenas. That same year, in partnership with the U.S. Soccer Foundation's It's Everyone's Game movement, Musco engineered the Mini-Pitch System, a modular mini soccer pitch used to expand recreational opportunities for youth in underserved communities.

Musco also installed systems at Notre Dame Stadium, L.A. Memorial Coliseum, Wimbledon Centre Court, AO Arena Manchester, and Tottenham Hotspur Stadium. The TLC for LED system was also installed at several collegiate stadiums, high school stadiums, Little League fields, parks and recreation fields, and at major airports and port terminals including Vancouver International Airport, Los Angeles International Airport, McCarran International Airport in Las Vegas, and DP World Jebel Ali Port Terminals 1 and 2.

=== 2020s ===
In 2021, Musco installed its TLC for LED and ShowLight systems at a newly-build stadium in Dyersville, Iowa, adjacent to the field featured in the motion picture Field of Dreams. On August 12, 2021 Major League Baseball staged the MLB at Field of Dreams event at the newly built stadium.

Projects for the company in 2022 included the installation of a custom TLC for LED system at Manchester United FC's home ground Old Trafford.

In 2024, Musco installed a TLC for LED system at Red Bull Arena, home of the New York Red Bulls of Major League Soccer.
