= Iowa Hawkeyes women's basketball statistical leaders =

The Iowa Hawkeyes women's basketball statistical leaders are individual statistical leaders of the Iowa Hawkeyes women's basketball program in various categories, including points, three-pointers, rebounds, assists, steals, and blocks. Within those areas, the lists identify single-game, single-season, and career leaders. The Hawkeyes represent the University of Iowa in the NCAA Division I Big Ten Conference.

Iowa began competing in intercollegiate women's basketball in 1974, before the NCAA governed women's sports; in that era, the main governing body for women's college sports was the Association of Intercollegiate Athletics for Women (AIAW). The NCAA began governing women's sports in the 1981–82 school year; after one year in which both the NCAA and AIAW held national championship events, the AIAW folded. Because of Iowa's relatively recent history in women's basketball, there is no "pre-modern" era of limited statistics; full box scores are available for all Iowa games, and the only rules change that seriously impacted statistical totals was the advent of the three-pointer, which was made mandatory in NCAA women's basketball in the 1987–88 season.

The NCAA has recorded individual scoring and rebounding totals since it began sponsoring women's sports championships. However, it did not officially record the other statistics included in this page until later. Assists were first officially recorded in women's basketball in the 1985–86 season. Blocks and steals were first officially recorded in 1987–88, the same season in which the use of the three-pointer was made mandatory. Iowa only includes three-point statistics since the national adoption of that rule, but otherwise includes statistics from the entire history of Iowa women's basketball.

These lists are updated through the end of the 2023–24 season. Players and their performances from the 2023–24 season are indicated in bold. Iowa's record books list only the record-holder in single-game statistics (including ties for the top spot) and not a full top 10.

== Scoring ==
| NCAA Division I record (career / season) |

Career
| Rank | Player | Points | Seasons |
|---|---|---|---|
| 1 | **Caitlin Clark** | 3,951 | 2020–21 2021–22 2022–23 2023–24 |
| 2 | Megan Gustafson | 2,804 | 2015–16 2016–17 2017–18 2018–19 |
| 3 | Monika Czinano | 2,413 | 2018–19 2019–20 2020–21 2021–22 2022–23 |
| 4 | Ally Disterhoft | 2,102 | 2013–14 2014–15 2015–16 2016–17 |
| 5 | Cindy Haugejorde | 2,059 | 1976–77 1977–78 1978–79 1979–80 |
| 6 | Lindsey Meder | 1,906 | 1998–99 1999–2000 2000–01 2001–02 |
| 7 | Jaime Printy | 1,841 | 2009–10 2010–11 2011–12 2012–13 |
| 8 | Michelle Edwards | 1,821 | 1984–85 1985–86 1986–87 1987–88 |
| 9 | Jennie Lillis | 1,762 | 2000–01 2001–02 2002–03 2003–04 |
| 10 | Franthea Price | 1,742 | 1986–87 1987–88 1988–89 1989–90 |

Season
| Rank | Player | Points | Season |
|---|---|---|---|
| 1 | **Caitlin Clark** | 1,234 | 2023–24 |
| 2 | **Caitlin Clark** | 1,055 | 2022–23 |
| 3 | Megan Gustafson | 1,001 | 2018–19 |
| 4 | Caitlin Clark | 863 | 2021–22 |
| 5 | Megan Gustafson | 823 | 2017–18 |
| 6 | Caitlin Clark | 799 | 2020–21 |
| 7 | Cindy Haugejorde | 672 | 1979–80 |
| 8 | Monika Czinano | 656 | 2021–22 |
| 9 | Monika Czinano | 650 | 2022–23 |
| 10 | Michelle Edwards | 621 | 1987–88 |

Single game
| Rank | Player | Points | Season | Opponent |
|---|---|---|---|---|
| 1 | **Caitlin Clark** | 49 | 2023–24 | Michigan |
| 2 | Megan Gustafson | 48 | 2017–18 | Minnesota |
| 3 | **Hannah Stuelke** | 47 | 2023–24 | Penn State |
| 4 | Crystal Smith | 46 | 2005–06 | Louisiana Tech |
| 4 | Caitlin Clark | 46 | 2021–22 | Michigan |
| 6 | Megan Gustafson | 45 | 2018–19 | Maryland |
| 6 | **Caitlin Clark** | 45 | 2022–23 | NC State |
| 6 | **Caitlin Clark** | 45 | 2023–24 | Ohio State |
| 9 | Megan Gustafson | 44 | 2018–19 | Drake |
| 9 | **Caitlin Clark** | 44 | 2021–22 | Evansville |
| 9 | **Caitlin Clark** | 44 | 2023–24 | Virginia Tech |

== Three-pointers ==
| NCAA Division I record (career / season) (Note: The NCAA recognizes single-season records for both total three-pointers and three-pointers per game. Official season leaders are based solely on three-pointers per game. Caitlin Clark set the current D-I women's records in both categories in 2023–24.) |

Career
| Rank | Player | 3FG | Seasons |
|---|---|---|---|
| 1 | **Caitlin Clark** | 548 | 2020–21 2021–22 2022–23 2023–24 |
| 2 | Melissa Dixon | 334 | 2011–12 2012–13 2013–14 2014–15 |
| 3 | Lindsey Meder | 261 | 1998–99 1999–00 2000–01 2001–02 |
| 4 | **Gabbie Marshall** | 258 | 2019–20 2020–21 2021–22 2022–23 2023–24 |
| 5 | Jaime Printy | 252 | 2009–10 2010–11 2011–12 2012–13 |
| 6 | Makenzie Meyer | 232 | 2016–17 2017–18 2018–19 2019–20 |
| 7 | Kamille Wahlin | 231 | 2008–09 2009–10 2010–11 2011–12 |
| 8 | Wendy Ausdemore | 221 | 2005–06 2006–07 2007–08 2008–09 |
| 9 | Kristi Smith | 185 | 2005–06 2006–07 2007–08 2008–09 |
| 10 | McKenna Warnock | 181 | 2019–20 2020–21 2021–22 2022–23 |

Season
| Rank | Player | 3FG | Season |
|---|---|---|---|
| 1 | **Caitlin Clark** | 201 | 2023–24 |
| 2 | **Caitlin Clark** | 140 | 2022–23 |
| 3 | Melissa Dixon | 124 | 2014–15 |
| 4 | Caitlin Clark | 116 | 2020–21 |
| 5 | Melissa Dixon | 97 | 2013–14 |
| 6 | Caitlin Clark | 91 | 2021–22 |
| 7 | Lindsey Meder | 84 | 2001–02 |
| 7 | Kamille Wahlin | 84 | 2009–10 |
| 9 | Jaime Printy | 82 | 2009–10 |
| 10 | Wendy Ausdemore | 78 | 2007–08 |
| 10 | Melissa Dixon | 78 | 2012–13 |

Single game
| Rank | Player | 3FG | Season | Opponent |
|---|---|---|---|---|
| 1 | Melissa Dixon | 10 | 2014–15 | Drake |
| 2 | Melissa Dixon | 9 | 2014–15 | Northwestern |
| 2 | **Caitlin Clark** | 9 | 2020–21 | Maryland |
| 2 | **Caitlin Clark** | 9 | 2023–24 | Cleveland State |
| 2 | **Caitlin Clark** | 9 | 2023–24 | Michigan |
| 2 | **Caitlin Clark** | 9 | 2023–24 | LSU |
| 7 | Melissa Dixon | 8 | 2014–15 | Illinois |
| 7 | Melissa Dixon | 8 | 2014–15 | Minnesota |
| 7 | **Caitlin Clark** | 8 | 2021–22 | Michigan |
| 7 | **Caitlin Clark** | 8 | 2022–23 | Louisville |
| 7 | **Caitlin Clark** | 8 | 2022–23 | LSU |
| 7 | **Caitlin Clark** | 8 | 2023–24 | Minnesota |
| 7 | **Caitlin Clark** | 8 | 2023–24 | Michigan State |
| 7 | **Caitlin Clark** | 8 | 2023–24 | Nebraska |
| 7 | **Caitlin Clark** | 8 | 2023–24 | Minnesota |

== Rebounds ==
Career
| Rank | Player | Rebounds | Seasons |
|---|---|---|---|
| 1 | Megan Gustafson | 1,460 | 2015–16 2016–17 2017–18 2018–19 |
| 2 | Cindy Haugejorde | 1,067 | 1976–77 1977–78 1978–79 1979–80 |
| 3 | **Caitlin Clark** | 990 | 2020–21 2021–22 2022–23 2023–24 |
| 4 | Samantha Logic | 922 | 2011–12 2012–13 2013–14 2014–15 |
| 5 | Kachine Alexander | 910 | 2007–08 2008–09 2009–10 2010–11 |
| 5 | Hannah Stuelke | 910 | 2022–23 2023–24 2024–25 2025–26 |
| 7 | Toni Foster | 887 | 1989–90 1990–91 1991–92 1992–93 |
| 8 | Morgan Johnson | 886 | 2009–10 2010–11 2011–12 2012–13 |
| 9 | Tangela Smith | 859 | 1994–95 1995–96 1996–97 1997–98 |
| 10 | Lisa Long | 848 | 1983–84 1984–85 1985–86 1986–87 |

Season
| Rank | Player | Rebounds | Season |
|---|---|---|---|
| 1 | Megan Gustafson | 481 | 2018–19 |
| 2 | Megan Gustafson | 411 | 2017–18 |
| 3 | Megan Gustafson | 343 | 2016–17 |
| 4 | Amy Herrig | 306 | 1998–99 |
| 5 | Cindy Haugejorde | 300 | 1977–78 |
| 6 | Cindy Haugejorde | 295 | 1979–80 |
| 6 | Kachine Alexander | 295 | 2010–11 |
| 8 | Hannah Stuelke | 289 | 2025–26 |
| 9 | **Caitlin Clark** | 287 | 2023–24 |
| 10 | Lisa Long | 282 | 1986–87 |
| 10 | Kachine Alexander | 282 | 2008–09 |

Single game
| Rank | Player | Rebounds | Season | Opponent |
|---|---|---|---|---|
| 1 | Jerica Watson | 26 | 2001–02 | Creighton |
| 2 | Amy Herrig | 25 | 1998–99 | Purdue |

== Assists ==
Career
| Rank | Player | Assists | Seasons |
|---|---|---|---|
| 1 | **Caitlin Clark** | 1,144 | 2020–21 2021–22 2022–23 2023–24 |
| 2 | Samantha Logic | 898 | 2011–12 2012–13 2013–14 2014–15 |
| 3 | Kathleen Doyle | 706 | 2016–17 2017–18 2018–19 2019–20 |
| 4 | Cara Consuegra | 576 | 1997–98 1998–99 1999–00 2000–01 |
| 5 | **Kate Martin** | 473 | 2019–20 2020–21 2021–22 2022–23 2023–24 |
| 6 | Michelle Edwards | 431 | 1984–85 1985–86 1986–87 1987–88 |
| 6 | Tania Davis | 431 | 2015–16 2016–17 2017–18 2018–19 |
| 8 | Kamille Wahlin | 427 | 2008–09 2009–10 2010–11 2011–12 |
| 9 | Kristi Smith | 412 | 2005–06 2006–07 2007–08 2008–09 |
| 9 | Jaime Printy | 412 | 2009–10 2010–11 2011–12 2012–13 |

Season
| Rank | Player | Assists | Season |
|---|---|---|---|
| 1 | **Caitlin Clark** | 346 | 2023–24 |
| 2 | **Caitlin Clark** | 327 | 2022–23 |
| 3 | Samantha Logic | 276 | 2014–15 |
| 4 | Samantha Logic | 269 | 2013–14 |
| 5 | Caitlin Clark | 257 | 2021–22 |
| 6 | Samantha Logic | 217 | 2012–13 |
| 7 | Caitlin Clark | 214 | 2020–21 |
| 8 | Kathleen Doyle | 199 | 2017–18 |
| 9 | Cara Consuegra | 191 | 2000–01 |
| 10 | Kathleen Doyle | 189 | 2019–20 |

Single game
| Rank | Player | Assists | Season | Opponent |
|---|---|---|---|---|
| 1 | Caitlin Clark | 18 | 2021–22 | Penn State |
| 2 | Caitlin Clark | 17 | 2022–23 | Ohio State |
| 3 | Kathleen Doyle | 15 | 2019–20 | Nebraska |
| 3 | **Caitlin Clark** | 15 | 2022–23 | Ohio State |
| 3 | **Caitlin Clark** | 15 | 2023–24 | Penn State |
| 3 | **Caitlin Clark** | 15 | 2023–24 | Michigan |
| 3 | **Caitlin Clark** | 15 | 2023–24 | Colorado |

== Steals ==
Career
| Rank | Player | Steals | Seasons |
|---|---|---|---|
| 1 | Franthea Price | 321 | 1986–87 1987–88 1988–89 1989–90 |
| 2 | Samantha Logic | 260 | 2011–12 2012–13 2013–14 2014–15 |
| 3 | Laurie Aaron | 248 | 1989–90 1990–91 1991–92 1992–93 |
| 4 | Kathleen Doyle | 238 | 2016–17 2017–18 2018–19 2019–20 |
| 5 | Michelle Edwards | 235 | 1984–85 1985–86 1986–87 1987–88 |
| 5 | **Gabbie Marshall** | 235 | 2019–20 2020–21 2021–22 2022–23 2023–24 |
| 7 | Steph Schueler | 222 | 1987–88 1988–89 1989–90 1990–91 |
| 8 | Crystal Smith | 213 | 2002–03 2003–04 2004–05 2005–06 |
| 9 | **Caitlin Clark** | 210 | 2020–21 2021–22 2022–23 2023–24 |
| 10 | Jolette Law | 205 | 1986–87 1987–88 1988–89 1989–90 |

Season
| Rank | Player | Steals | Season |
|---|---|---|---|
| 1 | Laurie Aaron | 122 | 1992–93 |
| 2 | Laurie Aaron | 101 | 1991–92 |
| 3 | Franthea Price | 95 | 1988–89 |
| 4 | Michelle Edwards | 89 | 1987–88 |
| 4 | Shanda Berry | 89 | 1988–89 |
| 6 | Samantha Logic | 88 | 2013–14 |
| 7 | Franthea Price | 84 | 1989–90 |
| 8 | Crystal Smith | 80 | 2004–05 |
| 9 | Steph Schueler | 76 | 1990–91 |
| 10 | Jerica Watson | 72 | 2001–02 |

Single game
| Rank | Player | Steals | Season | Opponent |
|---|---|---|---|---|
| 1 | Lisa Anderson | 9 | 1982–83 | Bradley |
| 1 | Lynn Kennedy | 9 | 1983–84 | Indiana |
| 1 | Franthea Price | 9 | 1989–90 | Purdue |
| 1 | Laurie Aaron | 9 | 1992–93 | Charlotte |

== Blocks ==
Career
| Rank | Player | Blocks | Seasons |
|---|---|---|---|
| 1 | Morgan Johnson | 293 | 2009–10 2010–11 2011–12 2012–13 |
| 2 | Bethany Doolittle | 278 | 2011–12 2012–13 2013–14 2014–15 |
| 3 | Tangela Smith | 235 | 1994–95 1995–96 1996–97 1997–98 |
| 4 | Megan Gustafson | 232 | 2015–16 2016–17 2017–18 2018–19 |
| 5 | Megan Skouby | 153 | 2005–06 2006–07 2007–08 2008–09 |
| 6 | Toni Foster | 145 | 1989–90 1990–91 1991–92 1992–93 |
| 7 | Jennie Lillis | 114 | 2000–01 2001–02 2002–03 2003–04 |
| 8 | Jamie Cavey | 94 | 2001–02 2002–03 2003–04 2004–05 |
| 9 | Chase Coley | 88 | 2014–15 2015–16 2016–17 2017–18 |
| 10 | Cathy Marx | 86 | 1990–91 1991–92 1992–93 1993–94 |
| | Addison O'Grady | 86 | 2021–22 2022–23 2023–24 2024–25 |

Season
| Rank | Player | Blocks | Season |
|---|---|---|---|
| 1 | Bethany Doolittle | 106 | 2013–14 |
| 2 | Bethany Doolittle | 94 | 2014–15 |
| 3 | Morgan Johnson | 79 | 2009–10 |
| 4 | Morgan Johnson | 76 | 2010–11 |
| 5 | Tangela Smith | 73 | 1994–95 |
| 6 | Morgan Johnson | 70 | 2011–12 |
| 7 | Tangela Smith | 69 | 1996–97 |
| 8 | Morgan Johnson | 68 | 2012–13 |
| 9 | Megan Gustafson | 66 | 2017–18 |
| 10 | Megan Gustafson | 63 | 2018–19 |

Single game
| Rank | Player | Blocks | Season | Opponent |
|---|---|---|---|---|
| 1 | Bethany Doolittle | 9 | 2014–15 | Minnesota |
