= 2005–06 Iowa Hawkeyes women's basketball team =

Intercollegiate basketball season

2005–06 Iowa Hawkeyes women's basketball

NCAA tournament, first round
- Conference: Big Ten Conference
- Record: 17–12 (10–6 Big Ten)
- Head coach: Lisa Bluder (6th season)
- Assistant coaches: Jan Jensen; Jenni Fitzgerald; Shannon Gage
- Home arena: Carver-Hawkeye Arena

2005–06 Big Ten women's basketball standings
	Conf.				Overall
Team	W		L	PCT	W		L	PCT
No. 2 Ohio State †	15	–	1	.938	29	–	3	.906
No. 11 Purdue	13	–	3	.813	26	–	7	.788
Michigan State	11	–	5	.688	24	–	10	.706
Minnesota	11	–	5	.688	19	–	10	.655
Iowa	10	–	6	.625	17	–	12	.586
Indiana	9	–	7	.563	19	–	14	.576
Illinois	6	–	10	.375	16	–	15	.516
Penn State	6	–	10	.375	13	–	16	.448
Wisconsin	5	–	11	.313	11	–	18	.379
Northwestern	2	–	14	.125	6	–	22	.214
Michigan	0	–	16	.000	6	–	23	.207
† 2006 Big Ten tournament winner As of March 13, 2006; Rankings from AP Poll

The 2005–06 Iowa Hawkeyes women's basketball team represented the University of Iowa during the 2005–06 NCAA Division I women's basketball season. The Hawkeyes, led by sixth-year head coach Lisa Bluder, played their home games at the Carver-Hawkeye Arena and were members of the Big Ten Conference. They finished with an overall record of 17–12 (10–6 Big Ten) to finish fourth in the regular season conference standings. Iowa lost to Michigan State in the quarterfinals of the 2006 Big Ten Conference women's basketball tournament. Iowa received an at-large bid to the 2006 NCAA Division I women's basketball tournament where they were defeated by BYU, 67–62, in the opening round.

This season marked Iowa's fourth NCAA tournament appearance under Coach Bluder.

Senior Crystal Smith established Iowa's single-game high in points with 46 against Louisiana Tech on November 22, 2005 (now 4th on the all-time list as of the end of the 2023–24 season).

== Roster ==
2005–06 Iowa Hawkeyes women's basketball team
Players
Coaches

Pos.	#	Name	Height	Year	Hometown
G	3	Abby Emmert	5 ft 9 in (1.75 m)	So	Winterset, Iowa
G	10	Crystal Smith	5 ft 6 in (1.68 m)	Sr	Haughton, Louisiana
G	11	Kristi Smith	5 ft 6 in (1.68 m)	Fr	Thornton, Colorado
F	24	Jenee Graham	5 ft 10 in (1.78 m)	So	Bolingbrook, Illinois
F	32	Wendy Ausdemore	6 ft 2 in (1.88 m)	Fr	Neola, Iowa
F	34	Johanna Solverson	6 ft 2 in (1.88 m)	RS So	Lake Zurich, Illinois
C	40	Stacy Schlapkohl	6 ft 3 in (1.91 m)	RS So	Durant, Iowa
F	43	Nicole VanderPol	6 ft 1 in (1.85 m)	RS Fr	Grundy Center, Iowa
C	44	Megan Skouby	6 ft 6 in (1.98 m)	RS Fr	Mentor, Ohio
G	50	Lindsey Nyenhuis	5 ft 7 in (1.7 m)	RS Fr	Grand Rapids, Michigan
F	51	Krista VandeVenter	6 ft 2 in (1.88 m)	RS So	Osseo, Minnesota

Head coach

- Lisa Bluder

Assistant coach(es)

- Jan Jensen
- Jenni Fitzgerald
- Shannon Gage

Legend

- (C) Team captain
- (S) Suspended
- (I) Ineligible
- (W) Walk-on
- Injured
- Current redshirt

Roster

== Schedule ==
Date time, TV	Rank^{#}	Opponent^{#}	Result	Record	Site (attendance) city, state
Exhibition
Regular season
Nov 22, 2005*		at Louisiana Tech	L 91–95 ^{2OT}	1–1	Thomas Assembly Center; Ruston, Louisiana
Feb 26, 2006		Indiana	W 78–70	17–10 (10–6)	Carver–Hawkeye Arena; Iowa City, Iowa
Big Ten tournament
Mar 3, 2006*	(10 SA)	vs. (7 SA) No. 22 Michigan State; Quarterfinals	L 58–79	17–11	Indianapolis, Indiana
NCAA tournament
Mar 18, 2006*	(10 SA)	vs. (7 SA) No. 22 BYU; First round	L 62–67	17–12	Pepsi Center; Denver, Colorado
*Non-conference game. ^{#}Rankings from AP Poll. (#) Tournament seedings in parentheses. SA=San Antonio. All times are in Central Time.

== See also ==
2005–06 Iowa Hawkeyes men's basketball team
