= 2010–11 Iowa Hawkeyes women's basketball team =

Intercollegiate basketball season

2010–11 Iowa Hawkeyes women's basketball

Islander Tip-Off Tournament Champions, KCRG-TV9 Hawkeye Challenge Champions, Caribbean Challenge Champions

NCAA tournament, first round
- Conference: Big Ten

Ranking
- Coaches: No. NR
- AP: No. NR
- Record: 22–9 (10–6 Big 10)
- Head coach: Lisa Bluder
- Assistant coaches: Jan Jensen; Jenni Fitzgerald; Shannon Gage
- Home arena: Carver-Hawkeye Arena

2010–11 Big Ten women's basketball standings
	Conf.				Overall
Team	W		L	PCT	W		L	PCT
No. 12 Michigan State	13	–	3	.813	25	–	9	.735
Penn State	11	–	5	.688	25	–	10	.714
No. 18 Ohio State †	10	–	6	.625	24	–	10	.706
Iowa	10	–	6	.625	22	–	9	.710
Michigan	10	–	6	.625	17	–	13	.567
Wisconsin	10	–	6	.625	16	–	15	.516
Purdue	9	–	7	.563	21	–	12	.636
Northwestern	6	–	10	.375	19	–	14	.576
Minnesota	4	–	12	.250	12	–	18	.400
Indiana	3	–	13	.188	9	–	20	.310
Illinois	2	–	14	.125	9	–	23	.281
† 2011 Big Ten tournament winner Rankings from AP poll

The 2010–11 Iowa Hawkeyes women's basketball team represented the University of Iowa in the 2010–11 NCAA Division I women's basketball season. The Hawkeyes are a member of the Big Ten Conference and finished 21–7 (10–6) during regular season play. They were eliminated from the Big Ten Conference women's basketball tournament in the second round and were invited to play in the NCAA Women's Division I Basketball Championship.

== Exhibition ==
Date	Opponent	Location	Time	Result	Record
11/07/10	vs. Concordia-St. Paul (Exhibition)	Iowa City, IA	1:00pm	W 101-59	

== Regular season ==
=== Schedule ===
Date	Opponent	Location	Time	Result	Record
11/12/10	vs. Southern (Islander Tip-Off Tournament)	Corpus-Christi, TX	5:00pm	W 76-52	1-0
11/13/10	vs. Arkansas State (Islander Tip-Off Tournament)	Corpus-Christi, TX	5:00pm	W 50-47	2-0
11/16/10	vs. Bradley	Iowa City, IA	5:00pm	W 91-53	3-0
11/20/10	vs. Northeastern (KCRG-TV9 Hawkeye Challenge)	Iowa City, IA	12:00pm	W 87-59	4-0
11/21/10	vs. Central Michigan (KCRG-TV9 Hawkeye Challenge)	Iowa City, IA	2:00pm	W 90-79	5-0
11/25/10	vs. James Madison (Caribbean Challenge)	Cancun, Mexico	6:30pm	W 67-61	6-0
11/26/10	vs. Virginia Tech (Caribbean Challenge)	Cancun, Mexico	6:30pm	W 72-43	7-0
12/02/10	at ^{15}North Carolina (ACC – Big Ten Challenge)	Chapel Hill, NC	6:00pm	L 79-67	7-1
12/05/10	vs. Kansas State	Iowa City, IA	2:00pm	W 68-62	8-1
12/09/10	vs. ^{15}Iowa State (Hy-Vee Cy-Hawk Series)	Iowa City, IA	7:00pm	W 62-40	9-1
12/18/10	at South Dakota St.	Brookings, SD	5:00pm	W 65-54	10-1
12/20/10	at Drake	Des Moines, IA	7:00pm	W 75-71	11-1
12/22/10	vs. Northern Iowa	Iowa City, IA	7:00pm	W 75-64	12-1
12/30/10	at Penn State	University Park, PA	6:00pm	L 68-59	12-2 (0-1)
01/02/11	vs. Michigan	Iowa City, IA	1:00pm	L 60-53	12-3 (0-2)
01/05/11	at Minnesota	Minneapolis, MN	7:00pm	W 63-57	13-3 (1-2)
01/08/11	vs. ^{21}Ohio State	Iowa City, IA	3:00pm	W 89-76	14-3 (2-2)
01/13/11	at ^{10}Michigan State	East Lansing, MI	5:30pm	L 63-60	14-4 (2-3)
01/16/11	vs. Indiana	Iowa City, IA	1:00pm	W 71-51	15-4 (3-3)
01/24/11	at Ohio State	Columbus, OH	6:00pm	L 81-67	15-5 (3-4)
01/27/11	vs. ^{11}Michigan State	Iowa City, IA	7:00pm	W 66-64	16-5 (4-4)
01/30/11	at Illinois	Champaign, IL	2:00pm	W 80-69	17-5 (5-4)
02/03/11	at Purdue	West Lafayette, IN	5:30pm	L 60-41	17-6 (5-5)
02/06/11	vs. Penn State	Iowa City, IA	2:00pm	L 82-75	17-7 (5-6)
02/10/11	vs. Minnesota	Iowa City, IA	8:00pm	W 64-62	18-7 (6-6)
02/13/11	at Northwestern	Evanston, IL	2:00pm	W 86-75	19-7 (7-6)
02/16/11	vs. Wisconsin	Iowa City, IA	7:00pm	W 59-44	20-7 (8-6)
02/24/11	vs. Illinois	Iowa City, IA	7:30pm	W 83-64	21-7 (9-6)
02/27/11	at Indiana	Bloomington, IN	1:00pm	W 93-79	22-7 (10-6)

=== Rankings by Week ===
Week	Associated Press	ESPN/USA Today Coaches Poll
Preseason	22	25
1 (Nov. 15)	22	24
2 (Nov. 22)	18	21
3 (Nov. 29)	19	18
4 (Dec. 6)	16	19
5 (Dec. 13)	16	15
6 (Dec. 20)	14	13
7 (Dec. 27)	14	13
8 (Jan. 3)	21	22
9 (Jan. 10)	16	20
10 (Jan. 17)	18	21
11 (Jan. 24)	18	21
12 (Jan. 31)	20	22
13 (Feb. 7)	NR (26)	NR (28)
14 (Feb. 14)	NR (26)	NR (27)
15 (Feb. 21)	NR (27)	NR (28)
16 (Feb. 28)	24	NR (26)
17 (Mar. 7)	NR (26)	NR (30)

=== Roster ===
Number	Name	Height	Position	Class	Hometown (Last School)
2	Kamille Wahlin	5'8"	G	Junior	Crookston, MN (Crookston High School)
3	Kalli Hansen	5'11"	F	Junior	Olin, IA (Kirkwood Community College)
4	Megan Considine	5'8"	G	Junior	Byron, IL (Byron High School)
11	Trisha Nesbitt	5'6"	G	Sophomore	Ames, IA (Ames High School)
12	Morgan Johnson	6'5"	C	Sophomore	Platte City, MO (Platte County High School)
20	Kelly Krei	6'2"	F	Junior	Iowa City, IA (City High School)
21	Kachine Alexander	5'9"	G	Senior	Minneapolis, MN (Belnide-St. Margaret's School)
22	Kelsey Cermak	6'1"	F	Senior	Norwalk, IA (Norwalk High School)
23	Theairra Taylor	5'11"	G	Sophomore	St. Paul, MN (Central High School)
24	Jaime Printy	5'11"	G	Sophomore	Marion, IA (Linn-Mar High School)
31	Hannah Draxten	6'0"	G/F	Sophomore (RS)	Fergus Falls, MN (Fergus Falls High School)
32	Jade Rogers	6'0"	F	Freshman	Cedar Rapids, IA (Kennedy High School)

== Player stats ==
Player	Games played	Minutes	Field goals	Three Pointers	Free Throws	Rebounds	Assists	Blocks	Steals	Points

== Postseason ==
=== Big Ten tournament ===
Iowa went into the 2011 Big Ten Conference women's basketball tournament with a 22-7 (10-6) record and was seeded 4th.

Date	Round	Opponent (Seed)	Location	Time	Result	Record
03/03/11	First Round	Bye	Indianapolis, IN			22-7 (10-6)
03/04/11	Quarterfinals	Ohio State (5)	Indianapolis, IN	7:30pm	L 71-61	22-8 (10-7)

=== NCAA Basketball tournament ===
Iowa was invited to the 2011 NCAA Division I women's basketball tournament as a 6 seed in the Spokane division.

Date	Round	Opponent (Seed)	Location	Time	Result	Record
03/19/11	First Round	Gonzaga (11)	Spokane, WA	3:10pm	L 92-86	22-9 (10-7)

== Awards and honors ==
Kachine Alexander

- Ranked #2 shooting guard in the country by ESPN.com and Fanhouse.com
- Lowe's Senior CLASS Award
- Preseason all-Big Ten (unanimous pick by coaches)
- MVP of Islander Tip-Off Tournament
- MVP of KCRG-TV9 Hawkeye Challenge
- Co-Big Ten Player of the Week (Nov. 22)
- First player in Iowa history, and the fifth in Big Ten history, to record 1,000 career points, 800 career rebounds and 300 career assists
- Selected to Big Ten all-Defensive team
- First team all-Big Ten selection by both league coaches and media
- Named to Mid-season Top 30 List for the Naismith Award
- Named to Top 20 Mid-season List for the Wooden Award
- Named to the Women's Basketball Coaches Association (WBCA) all-Region team
- Wade Trophy Watch List
- AP All-America Honorable Mention

== Team players drafted into the WNBA ==
Round	Pick (Overall)	Player	NBA club
Third	2 (26)	Kachine Alexander	Minnesota Lynx

== See also ==
- 2010–11 Big Ten women's basketball season
