= 2011–12 Iowa Hawkeyes women's basketball team =

Intercollegiate basketball season

2011–12 Iowa Hawkeyes women's basketball

NCAA tournament, first round
- Conference: Big Ten Conference
- Record: 19–12 (11–5 Big Ten)
- Head coach: Lisa Bluder (12th season)
- Assistant coaches: Jan Jensen; Jenni Fitzgerald; Shannon Gage
- Home arena: Carver-Hawkeye Arena

2011–12 Big Ten women's basketball standings
	Conf.				Overall
Team	W		L	PCT	W		L	PCT
No. 11 Penn State	13	–	3	.813	26	–	7	.788
No. 13 Purdue †	11	–	5	.688	25	–	9	.735
No. 16 Ohio State	11	–	5	.688	25	–	7	.781
Michigan State	11	–	5	.688	20	–	12	.625
Iowa	11	–	5	.688	19	–	12	.613
No. 17 Nebraska	10	–	6	.625	24	–	9	.727
Michigan	8	–	8	.500	20	–	12	.625
Minnesota	6	–	10	.375	19	–	17	.528
Illinois	5	–	11	.313	11	–	19	.367
Wisconsin	5	–	11	.313	9	–	20	.310
Northwestern	4	–	12	.250	14	–	16	.467
Indiana	1	–	15	.063	6	–	24	.200
† 2012 Big Ten tournament winner Rankings from AP poll

The 2011–12 Iowa Hawkeyes women's basketball team represented the University of Iowa during the 2011–12 NCAA Division I women's basketball season. The Hawkeyes, led by twelfth-year head coach Lisa Bluder, played their home games at the Carver-Hawkeye Arena and were members of the Big Ten Conference. They finished with an overall record of 19–12 (11–5 Big Ten) to finish tied for second in the conference standings. They lost to Nebraska in the quarterfinals of the 2012 Big Ten Conference women's basketball tournament. Iowa received an at-large bid to the 2012 NCAA Division I women's basketball tournament where they were defeated by California in the opening round.

== Roster ==
2011–12 Iowa Hawkeyes women's basketball team
Players
Coaches

Pos.	#	Name	Height	Year	Hometown
G	2	Kamille Wahlin	5 ft 8 in (1.73 m)	Sr	Crookston, Minnesota
F	3	Kali Hansen	5 ft 11 in (1.8 m)	Sr	Olin, Iowa
G	4	Megan Considine	5 ft 8 in (1.73 m)	Sr	Byron, Illinois
G	11	Trisha Nesbitt	5 ft 6 in (1.68 m)	Jr	Ames, Iowa
C	12	Morgan Johnson	6 ft 5 in (1.96 m)	Jr	Platte City, Missouri
F	20	Kelly Krei	6 ft 2 in (1.88 m)	Sr	Iowa City, Iowa
G	21	Melissa Dixon	5 ft 8 in (1.73 m)	Fr	Johnsburg, Illinois
G	22	Samantha Logic	5 ft 9 in (1.75 m)	Fr	Racine, Wisconsin
G	23	Theairra Taylor	5 ft 11 in (1.8 m)	RS So	St. Paul, Minnesota
G	24	Jaime Printy	5 ft 11 in (1.8 m)	Jr	Marion, Iowa
F	32	Jade Rogers	6 ft 0 in (1.83 m)	So	Cedar Rapids, Iowa
G	33	Kathryn Reynolds	5 ft 7 in (1.7 m)	Fr	Cincinnati, Ohio
F	34	Virginia Johnson	6 ft 2 in (1.88 m)	Fr	Iowa City, Iowa
C	51	Bethany Doolittle	6 ft 4 in (1.93 m)	Fr	Oakdale, Minnesota

Head coach

- Lisa Bluder

Assistant coach(es)

Legend

- (C) Team captain
- (S) Suspended
- (I) Ineligible
- (W) Walk-on
- Injured
- Current redshirt

Roster

== Schedule ==
Date time, TV	Rank^{#}	Opponent^{#}	Result	Record	Site (attendance) city, state
Exhibition
Regular season
Nov 12, 2011*		Harvard	W 90–81	1–0	Carver-Hawkeye Arena; Iowa City, Iowa
Feb 26, 2012		Michigan	W 79–71	19–10 (11–5)	Carver-Hawkeye Arena; Iowa City, Iowa
Big Ten tournament
Mar 2, 2012*	(3)	(6) No. 24 Nebraska	L 68–80	19–11	Bankers Life Fieldhouse; Indianapolis, Indiana
NCAA tournament
Mar 18, 2012*		vs. California; First round	L 74–84	19–12	Joyce Center; Notre Dame, Indiana
*Non-conference game. ^{#}Rankings from AP Poll. (#) Tournament seedings in parentheses. All times are in Central Time.

== See also ==
2011–12 Iowa Hawkeyes men's basketball team
