= 2001–02 Iowa Hawkeyes women's basketball team =

Intercollegiate basketball season

2001–02 Iowa Hawkeyes women's basketball

Great Alaska Shootout champions

NCAA tournament, Second round
- Conference: Big Ten Conference
- Record: 18–11 (10–6 Big Ten)
- Head coach: Lisa Bluder (2nd season)
- Assistant coach: Jan Jensen
- Home arena: Carver–Hawkeye Arena

2001–02 Big Ten women's basketball standings
	Conf.				Overall
Team	W		L	PCT	W		L	PCT
No. 9 Purdue	13	–	3	.813	24	–	6	.800
No. 18 Minnesota	11	–	5	.688	22	–	8	.733
No. 24 Penn State	11	–	5	.688	23	–	12	.657
Iowa	10	–	6	.625	18	–	11	.621
Wisconsin	8	–	8	.500	19	–	12	.613
Indiana †	8	–	8	.500	17	–	14	.548
Ohio State	8	–	8	.500	14	–	15	.483
Illinois	7	–	9	.438	15	–	14	.517
Michigan State	6	–	10	.375	19	–	13	.594
Michigan	6	–	10	.375	17	–	13	.567
Northwestern	0	–	16	.000	4	–	24	.143
† 2002 Big Ten Tournament winner Rankings from AP Poll

The 2001–02 Iowa Hawkeyes women's basketball team represented the University of Iowa as members of the Big Ten Conference during the 2001–02 NCAA women's basketball season. The Hawkeyes, led by second-year head coach Lisa Bluder, played their home games in Iowa City, Iowa, at Carver–Hawkeye Arena. They finished the season 18–11 overall, 10–6 in Big Ten play, to occupy fourth place in the conference regular season standings. The team was eliminated in the quarterfinals of the Big Ten tournament, but received an at-large bid to the women's NCAA basketball tournament. After an opening round win over Virginia, the Hawkeyes were dominated by No. 1 and eventual national champion Connecticut.

== Roster ==
2001–02 Iowa Hawkeyes women's basketball team
Players
Coaches

Pos.	#	Name	Height	Year	Previous school	Hometown
G	2	Kristi Faulkner	5 ft 7 in (1.7 m)	So		Glen Ellyn, Illinois
F	5	Jerica Watson	6 ft 0 in (1.83 m)	Sr	Washington	Milwaukee, Wisconsin
G	10	Lindsey Meder	5 ft 8 in (1.73 m)	Sr	Solon	Solon, IA
G	12	Leah Magner	6 ft 0 in (1.83 m)	Sr
C	44	Beatrice Bullock	6 ft 1 in (1.85 m)	Sr
F	50	Jennie Lillis	6 ft 1 in (1.85 m)	So	Dowling Catholic	Urbandale, IA
C	52	Jamie Cavey	6 ft 3 in (1.91 m)	Fr	North Cedar	Mechanicsville, Iowa

Head coach

- Lisa Bluder

Assistant coach(es)

- Jan Jensen

Legend

- (C) Team captain
- (S) Suspended
- (I) Ineligible
- (W) Walk-on
- Injured
- Current redshirt

Roster

== Schedule and results ==
Date time, TV	Rank^{#}	Opponent^{#}	Result	Record	Site city, state
Regular season
November 20, 2000*		vs. Gonzaga; Great Alaska Shootout	W 69–54	1–0	Sullivan Arena; Anchorage, Alaska
November 21, 2000*		vs. Marquette; Great Alaska Shootout	W 90–72	2–0	Sullivan Arena; Anchorage, Alaska
November 25, 2000*		Drake	L 72–75 ^{OT}	2–1	Carver–Hawkeye Arena; Iowa City, Iowa
November 27, 2000*		SW Missouri State	W 84–64	3–1	Carver–Hawkeye Arena; Iowa City, Iowa
Big Ten tournament
Mar 2, 2001*		vs. Indiana; Quarterfinals	L 76–78 ^{OT}	17–10	Indianapolis, Indiana
NCAA tournament
Mar 16, 2002*	(9 E)	vs. (8 E) Virginia; First round	W 69–62	18–10	Gampel Pavilion; Storrs, Connecticut
Mar 18, 2002*; ESPN	(9 E)	at (1 E) No. 1 Connecticut; Second round	L 48–86	18–11	Gampel Pavilion (10,027); Storrs, Connecticut
*Non-conference game. ^{#}Rankings from AP Poll. (#) Tournament seedings in parentheses. MW=Midwest.
