= 2012–13 Iowa Hawkeyes women's basketball team =

Intercollegiate basketball season

2012–13 Iowa Hawkeyes women's basketball

NCAA tournament, second round
- Conference: Big Ten Conference
- Record: 21–13 (8–8 Big Ten)
- Head coach: Lisa Bluder (13th season)
- Assistant coaches: Jan Jensen; Jenni Fitzgerald; Shannon Gage
- Home arena: Carver-Hawkeye Arena

2012–13 Big Ten women's basketball standings
	Conf.				Overall
Team	W		L	PCT	W		L	PCT
No. 8 Penn State	14	–	2	.875	26	–	6	.813
No. 24 Nebraska	12	–	4	.750	25	–	9	.735
Michigan State	10	–	6	.625	25	–	9	.735
No. 21 Purdue †	10	–	6	.625	25	–	9	.735
Michigan	9	–	7	.563	22	–	11	.667
Illinois	9	–	7	.563	19	–	14	.576
Iowa	8	–	8	.500	21	–	13	.618
Minnesota	7	–	9	.438	18	–	14	.563
Ohio State	7	–	9	.438	18	–	13	.581
Northwestern	5	–	11	.313	13	–	17	.433
Wisconsin	3	–	13	.188	12	–	19	.387
Indiana	2	–	14	.125	11	–	19	.367
† 2013 Big Ten tournament winner Rankings from AP poll

The 2012–13 Iowa Hawkeyes women's basketball team represented the University of Iowa during the 2012–13 NCAA Division I women's basketball season. The Hawkeyes, led by thirteenth-year head coach Lisa Bluder, played their home games at the Carver-Hawkeye Arena and were members of the Big Ten Conference. They finished with an overall record of 21–13 (8–8 Big Ten) to finish 7th in the conference standings. They lost in the quarterfinals of the 2013 Big Ten Conference women's basketball tournament to Nebraska. Iowa received an at-large bid to the 2013 NCAA Division I women's basketball tournament where they defeated Miami (FL) in the first round before getting defeated by No. 2 and eventual Final Four participant Notre Dame in the second round.

== Roster ==
2012–13 Iowa Hawkeyes women's basketball team
Players
Coaches

Pos.	#	Name	Height	Year	Hometown
F	3	Claire Till	6 ft 0 in (1.83 m)	Fr	Dubuque, Iowa
G	11	Trisha Nesbitt	5 ft 6 in (1.68 m)	Sr	Ames, Iowa
C	12	Morgan Johnson	6 ft 5 in (1.96 m)	Sr	Platte City, Missouri
G	13	Kathy Thomas	5 ft 6 in (1.68 m)	So	Flint, Michigan
G	21	Melissa Dixon	5 ft 8 in (1.73 m)	So	Johnsburg, Illinois
G	22	Samantha Logic	5 ft 9 in (1.75 m)	So	Racine, Wisconsin
G	23	Theairra Taylor	5 ft 11 in (1.8 m)	RS Jr	St. Paul, Minnesota
G	24	Jaime Printy	5 ft 11 in (1.8 m)	Sr	Marion, Iowa
G	25	Kali Peschel	6 ft 1 in (1.85 m)	Fr	Sauk Centre, Minnesota
G	33	Kathryn Reynolds	5 ft 7 in (1.7 m)	So	Cincinnati, Ohio
C	45	Nicole Smith	6 ft 4 in (1.93 m)	Fr	Rockton, Illinois
C	51	Bethany Doolittle	6 ft 4 in (1.93 m)	So	Oakdale, Minnesota
F	54	Kayla Timmerman	6 ft 3 in (1.91 m)	Fr	Wayzata, Minnesota

Head coach

- Lisa Bluder

Assistant coach(es)

Legend

- (C) Team captain
- (S) Suspended
- (I) Ineligible
- (W) Walk-on
- Injured
- Current redshirt

Roster

== Schedule ==
Date time, TV	Rank^{#}	Opponent^{#}	Result	Record	Site (attendance) city, state
Exhibition
Nov 4, 2012*; 7:00 pm		Quincy	W 86–51	–	Carver-Hawkeye Arena; Iowa City, Iowa
Regular season
Nov 9, 2012*		Northern Illinois	W 63–40	1–0	Carver-Hawkeye Arena; Iowa City, Iowa
Nov 11, 2012*		Illinois State	W 74–64	2–0	Carver-Hawkeye Arena; Iowa City, Iowa
Nov 14, 2012*		Middle Tennessee State	W 69–63 ^{OT}	3–0	Carver-Hawkeye Arena; Iowa City, Iowa
Nov 18, 2012*		North Carolina	L 64–77	3–1	Carver-Hawkeye Arena; Iowa City, Iowa
Feb 24, 2013		at No. 24 Nebraska	L 46–66	17–11 (6–8)	Bob Devaney Sports Center; Lincoln, Nebraska
Feb 28, 2013		Indiana	W 75–70	18–11 (7–8)	Carver-Hawkeye Arena; Iowa City, Iowa
Mar 3, 2013		at Northwestern	W 62–45	19–11 (8–8)	Welsh-Ryan Arena; Evanston, Illinois
Big Ten tournament
Mar 7, 2013*	(7)	vs. (10) Northwestern; First round	W 60–55	20–11	Sears Centre Arena; Hoffman Estates, Illinois
Mar 8, 2013*	(7)	vs. (2) No. 21 Nebraska; Quarterfinals	L 61–76	20–12	Sears Centre Arena; Hoffman Estates, Illinois
NCAA tournament
Mar 24, 2013*	(9 E)	at (8 E) Miami (FL); First round	W 69–53	21–12	Carver-Hawkeye Arena; Iowa City, Iowa
Mar 26, 2013*	(9 E)	at (1 E) No. 2 Notre Dame; Second round	L 57–74	21–13	Carver-Hawkeye Arena (4,942); Iowa City, Iowa
*Non-conference game. ^{#}Rankings from AP Poll. (#) Tournament seedings in parentheses. All times are in Central Time.

== See also ==
2012–13 Iowa Hawkeyes men's basketball team
