= 2007–08 Iowa Hawkeyes women's basketball team =

Intercollegiate basketball season

2007–08 Iowa Hawkeyes women's basketball

Big Ten regular season co-champions

NCAA tournament, first round
- Conference: Big Ten Conference
- Record: 21–11 (13–5 Big Ten)
- Head coach: Lisa Bluder (8th season)
- Assistant coaches: Jan Jensen; Jenni Fitzgerald; Shannon Gage
- Home arena: Carver-Hawkeye Arena

2007–08 Big Ten women's basketball standings
	Conf.				Overall
Team	W		L	PCT	W		L	PCT
No. 25 Ohio State	13	–	5	.722	22	–	9	.710
Iowa	13	–	5	.722	21	–	11	.656
Minnesota	11	–	7	.611	20	–	12	.625
Purdue †	11	–	7	.611	19	–	15	.559
Michigan State	10	–	8	.556	23	–	14	.622
Indiana	10	–	8	.556	18	–	15	.545
Michigan	9	–	9	.500	19	–	14	.576
Wisconsin	9	–	9	.500	16	–	14	.533
Illinois	8	–	10	.444	20	–	15	.571
Penn State	4	–	14	.222	13	–	18	.419
Northwestern	1	–	17	.056	5	–	26	.161
† 2008 Big Ten tournament winner As of March 10, 2008; Rankings from AP Poll

The 2007–08 Iowa Hawkeyes women's basketball team represented the University of Iowa during the 2007–08 NCAA Division I women's basketball season. The Hawkeyes, led by eighth-year head coach Lisa Bluder, played their home games at the Carver-Hawkeye Arena and were members of the Big Ten Conference. They finished with an overall record of 21–11 (13–5 Big Ten) to finish tied for the regular season conference title. Iowa lost to Purdue, the eventual conference tournament champion, in the semifinals of the 2008 Big Ten Conference women's basketball tournament. Iowa received an at-large bid to the 2008 NCAA Division I women's basketball tournament where they were defeated by Georgia in the opening round.

This season kicked off a run of eight straight seasons with the Iowa women playing in the NCAA tournament.

Junior Wendy Ausdemore hit 78 three-pointers on the season to land in the number two spot on Iowa's single-season list (10th as of the end of the 2023–24 season).

== Roster ==
2007–08 Iowa Hawkeyes women's basketball team
Players
Coaches

Pos.	#	Name	Height	Year	Hometown
G	3	Abby Emmert	5 ft 9 in (1.75 m)	Sr	Winterset, Iowa
G	11	Kristi Smith	5 ft 6 in (1.68 m)	Jr	Thornton, Colorado
G	21	Kachine Alexander	5 ft 9 in (1.75 m)	Fr	Minneapolis, Minnesota
F	22	Kelsey Cermak	6 ft 1 in (1.85 m)	Fr	Norwalk, Iowa
F	24	Jenee Graham	5 ft 10 in (1.78 m)	Sr	Bolingbrook, Illinois
F	32	Wendy Ausdemore	6 ft 2 in (1.88 m)	Jr	Neola, Iowa
F	34	Johanna Solverson	6 ft 2 in (1.88 m)	RS Sr	Lake Zurich, Illinois
C	40	Stacy Schlapkohl	6 ft 3 in (1.91 m)	RS Sr	Durant, Iowa
F	43	Nicole VanderPol	6 ft 1 in (1.85 m)	RS Jr	Grundy Center, Iowa
C	44	Megan Skouby	6 ft 6 in (1.98 m)	RS Jr	Mentor, Ohio
C	45	JoAnn Hamlin	6 ft 3 in (1.91 m)	RS So	Douglass, Kansas
G	50	Lindsey Nyenhuis	5 ft 7 in (1.7 m)	RS Jr	Grand Rapids, Michigan
F	51	Krista VandeVenter	6 ft 2 in (1.88 m)	RS Sr	Osseo, Minnesota

Head coach

- Lisa Bluder

Assistant coach(es)

- Jan Jensen
- Jenni Fitzgerald
- Shannon Gage

Legend

- (C) Team captain
- (S) Suspended
- (I) Ineligible
- (W) Walk-on
- Injured
- Current redshirt

Roster

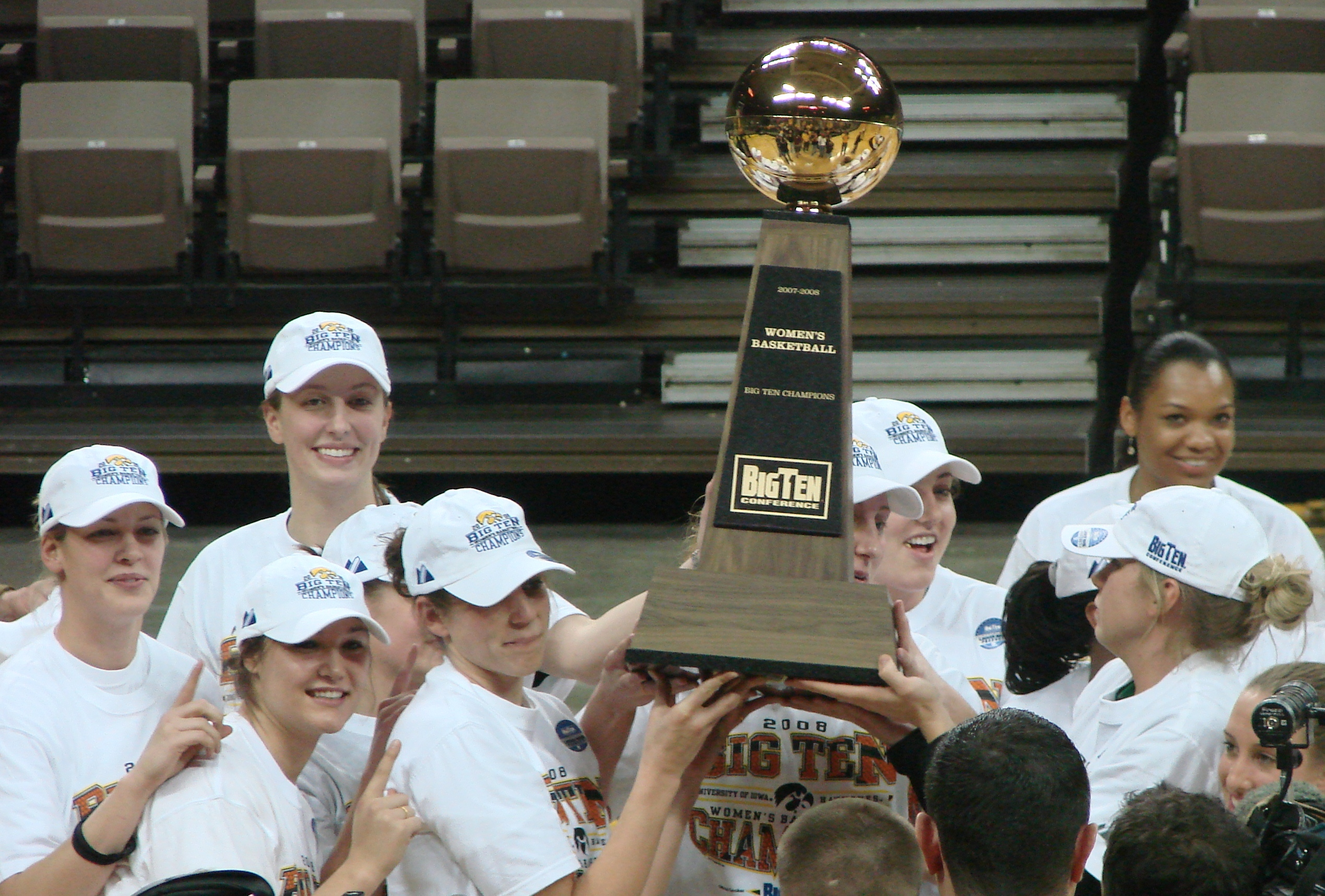
Members of Iowa's 2007–08 women's basketball team celebrate their 2008 regular season Big Ten championship after a win at Wisconsin on March 2, 2008

== Schedule ==
Date time, TV	Rank^{#}	Opponent^{#}	Result	Record	Site (attendance) city, state
Exhibition
Regular season
Mar 2, 2008		at Wisconsin	W 87–78	20–9 (13–5)	Kohl Center; Madison, Wisconsin
Big Ten tournament
Mar 7, 2008*		vs. Michigan; Quarterfinals	W 58–37	21–9	Conseco Fieldhouse; Indianapolis, Indiana
Mar 8, 2008*		vs. Purdue; Semifinals	L 73–80	21–10	Conseco Fieldhouse; Indianapolis, Indiana
NCAA tournament
Mar 23, 2008*	(9)	vs. (8) Georgia; First round	L 61–67	21–11	Ted Constant Convocation Center; Norfolk, Virginia
*Non-conference game. ^{#}Rankings from AP Poll. (#) Tournament seedings in parentheses. All times are in Central Time.

== See also ==
2007–08 Iowa Hawkeyes men's basketball team
