= 2008–09 Iowa Hawkeyes women's basketball team =

Intercollegiate basketball season

2008–09 Iowa Hawkeyes women's basketball

NCAA tournament, first round
- Conference: Big Ten
- Record: 21–11 (13–5 Big 10)
- Head coach: Lisa Bluder
- Assistant coaches: Jan Jensen; Jenni Fitzgerald; Shannon Gage
- Home arena: Carver-Hawkeye Arena

2008–09 Big Ten women's basketball standings
	Conf.				Overall
Team	W		L	PCT	W		L	PCT
No. 10 Ohio State †	15	–	3	.833	29	–	6	.829
Purdue	13	–	5	.722	25	–	11	.694
Michigan State	13	–	5	.722	22	–	11	.667
Iowa	13	–	5	.722	21	–	11	.656
Indiana	11	–	7	.611	21	–	11	.656
Minnesota	11	–	7	.611	20	–	12	.625
Wisconsin	6	–	12	.333	19	–	15	.559
Penn State	6	–	12	.333	11	–	18	.379
Illinois	5	–	13	.278	10	–	21	.323
Michigan	3	–	15	.167	10	–	20	.333
Northwestern	3	–	15	.167	7	–	23	.233
† 2009 Big Ten tournament winner As of March 9, 2009; Rankings from AP Poll

The 2008–09 Iowa Hawkeyes women's basketball team represented the University of Iowa during the 2008–09 NCAA Division I women's basketball season. The Hawkeyes finished the season with a record of 21–11, 13–5 in Big Ten, and finished the regular season tied for second place in the Big Ten. They advanced to the semifinals of the Big Ten Women's Basketball Tournament, where they lost to Ohio State. They received an at-large bid to the NCAA women's tournament, where they lost in the first round to Georgia Tech.

== Roster ==
- Head coach: Lisa Bluder
- Associate head coach: Jan Jensen
- Assistant coaches: Jenni Fitzgerald, Shannon Gage

Pos.	#	Name	Height	Year	Hometown (high school)
G	2	Kamille Wahlin	5-8	Fr.	Crookston, MN (Crookston)
G	11	Kristi Smith	5-6	Sr.	Thornston, CO (Horizon)
G	13	Shante Jones	5-9	Fr.	Dayton, OH (Carroll)
F	20	Kelly Krei	6-2	Fr.	Iowa City, IA (City)
G	21	Kachine Alexander	5-9	So.	Minneapolis, MN (Benilde-St. Margaret's)
F	22	Kalsey Cermak	6-1	So.	Norwalk, IA (Norwalk)
G/F	31	Hannah Draxten	6-0	Fr.	Fergus Falls, MN (Fergus Falls)
F	32	Wendy Ausdemore	6-2	Sr.	Neola, IA (Tri-Center)
F	43	Nicole VanderPol	6-1	Sr.	Grundy Center, IA (Grundy Center)
C	44	Megan Skouby	6-6	Sr.	Mentor, OH (mentor)
F/C	45	JoAnn Hamlin	6-3	Jr.	Douglass, KS (Winfield/Kansas State)
G	50	Lindsay Nyenhuis	5-7	Sr.	Grand Rapids, MI (Forest Hills Northern)

=== Schedule ===
Date	Opponent	Result	Record	Site
11/16	Texas State	W 87-45	1-0	Iowa City, IA
11/18	Kansas	L 76-55	1-1	Lawrence, KS
11/22	Boston Univ.	W 83-58	2-1	Iowa City, IA
11/23	Providence	W 64-46	3-1	Iowa City, IA
11/27	Texas Tech	W 56-48	4-1	US Virgin Islands
11/28	South Florida	L 82-79 (OT)	4-2	US Virgin Islands
11/29	California	L 76-43	4-3	US Virgin Islands
12/4	Duke	L 71-47	4-4	Durham, NC
12/7	Iowa State	W 66-46	5-4	Iowa City, IA
12/11	Northern Iowa	W 72-46	6-4	Iowa City, IA
12/20	Drake	W 71-53	7-4	Des Moines, IA
12/22	Wisconsin	W 73-63	8-4	Madison, WI
12/28	Purdue	L 69-60	8-5	Iowa City, IA
1/4	Indiana	L 76-54	8-6	Bloomington, IN
1/8	Purdue	L 60-49	8-7	W. Lafayette, IN
1/11	Minnesota	W 74-57	9-7	Iowa City, IA
1/15	Illinois	W 75-62	10-7	Champaign, IL
1/18	Northwestern	W 74-46	11-7	Iowa City, IA
1/26	Michigan	W 77-69	12-7	Iowa City, IA
1/29	Michigan State	L 68-56	12-8	East Lansing, MI
2/1	Penn State	W 97-86	13-8	Iowa City, IA
2/5	Indiana	W 69-67	14-8	Iowa City, IA
2/8	Minnesota	L 64-58	14-9	Minneapolis, MN
2/12	Ohio State	W 85-74	15-9	Iowa City, IA
2/15	Penn State	W 97-89 (3 ot)	16-9	Iowa City, IA
2/19	Wisconsin	W 72-65	17-9	Iowa City, IA
2/22	Michigan	W 68-64	18-9	Ann Arbor, MI
2/26	Illinois	W 69-56	19-9	Iowa City, IA
3/1	Northwestern	W 86-79	20-9	Iowa City, IA
3/6	Minnesota	W 79-64	21-9	Indianapolis, IN (Big Ten tournament)
3/7	Ohio State	L 72-56	21-10	Indianapolis, IN (Big Ten tournament)
3/22	Georgia Tech	L 76-62	21-11	Iowa City, IA (NCAA Tournament)
