= 2003–04 Iowa Hawkeyes women's basketball team =

Intercollegiate basketball season

2003–04 Iowa Hawkeyes women's basketball

NCAA tournament, First round
- Conference: Big Ten Conference
- Record: 16–13 (10–6 Big Ten)
- Head coach: Lisa Bluder (4th season)
- Assistant coach: Jan Jensen
- Home arena: Carver–Hawkeye Arena

2003–04 Big Ten women's basketball standings
	Conf.				Overall
Team	W		L	PCT	W		L	PCT
No. 5 Penn State	15	–	1	.938	28	–	6	.824
No. 3 Purdue †	14	–	2	.875	29	–	4	.879
No. 21 Ohio State	11	–	5	.688	21	–	10	.677
No. 23 Michigan State	10	–	6	.625	22	–	9	.710
Iowa	10	–	6	.625	16	–	13	.552
No. 24 Minnesota	9	–	7	.563	25	–	9	.735
Michigan	6	–	10	.375	14	–	17	.452
Indiana	4	–	12	.250	12	–	17	.414
Illinois	4	–	12	.250	10	–	18	.357
Wisconsin	4	–	12	.250	10	–	17	.370
Northwestern	1	–	15	.063	8	–	20	.286
† 2004 Big Ten tournament winner As of March 13, 2004; Rankings from AP Poll

The 2003–04 Iowa Hawkeyes women's basketball team represented the University of Iowa as members of the Big Ten Conference during the 2003–04 NCAA women's basketball season. The Hawkeyes, led by fourth-year head coach Lisa Bluder, played their home games in Iowa City, Iowa, at Carver–Hawkeye Arena. They finished the season 16–13 overall, 10–6 in Big Ten play, to occupy fourth place in the conference regular season standings. The team was eliminated in the quarterfinals of the Big Ten tournament, but received an at-large bid to the women's NCAA basketball tournament. Playing as the No. 9 seed in the East region, the Hawkeyes were eliminated in the opening round by No. 8 seed Virginia Tech.

== Roster ==
2003–04 Iowa Hawkeyes women's basketball team
Players
Coaches

Pos.	#	Name	Height	Year	Previous school	Hometown
G	2	Kristi Faulkner	5 ft 7 in (1.7 m)	Sr		Glen Ellyn, Illinois
G	10	Crystal Smith	5 ft 6 in (1.68 m)	So		Haughton, Louisiana
F	50	Jennie Lillis	6 ft 1 in (1.85 m)	Sr	Dowling Catholic	Urbandale, IA
C	52	Jamie Cavey	6 ft 3 in (1.91 m)	Jr	North Cedar	Mechanicsville, Iowa

Head coach

- Lisa Bluder

Assistant coach(es)

- Jan Jensen

Legend

- (C) Team captain
- (S) Suspended
- (I) Ineligible
- (W) Walk-on
- Injured
- Current redshirt

Roster

== Schedule and results ==
Date time, TV	Rank^{#}	Opponent^{#}	Result	Record	Site city, state
Regular season
Nov 21, 2003*		Butler; Hawkeye Challenge	W 83–60	1–0	Carver–Hawkeye Arena; Iowa City, Iowa
Nov 22, 2003*		Houston; Hawkeye Challenge	L 64–70	1–1	Carver–Hawkeye Arena; Iowa City, Iowa
Big Ten tournament
Mar 5, 2004*		vs. Michigan State; Quarterfinals	L 54–81	16–12	Indianapolis, Indiana
NCAA tournament
Mar 21, 2004*	(9 E)	at (8 E) Virginia Tech; First round	L 76–89	16–13	Cassell Coliseum; Blacksburg, Virginia
*Non-conference game. ^{#}Rankings from AP Poll. (#) Tournament seedings in parentheses. E=East.
