= 2020–21 Iowa Hawkeyes women's basketball team =

Intercollegiate basketball season

2020–21 Iowa Hawkeyes women's basketball

NCAA tournament, Sweet 16
- Conference: Big Ten Conference

Ranking
- Coaches: No. 19
- Record: 20–10 (11–8 Big Ten)
- Head coach: Lisa Bluder (21st season)
- Assistant coaches: Jan Jensen; Raina Harmon; Abby Stamp
- Home arena: Carver–Hawkeye Arena

2020–21 Big Ten women's basketball standings
	Conf.				Overall
Team	W		L	PCT	W		L	PCT
No. 7 Maryland †	17	–	1	.944	26	–	2	.929
No. 12 Indiana	16	–	2	.889	20	–	5	.800
No. 21 Rutgers	10	–	3	.769	14	–	5	.737
No. 16 Michigan	9	–	4	.692	16	–	6	.727
Northwestern	11	–	7	.611	16	–	9	.640
Iowa	11	–	8	.579	20	–	9	.690
No. 22 Ohio State	9	–	7	.563	13	–	7	.650
Michigan State	8	–	7	.533	15	–	9	.625
Nebraska	9	–	10	.474	13	–	13	.500
Minnesota	7	–	11	.389	8	–	13	.381
Penn State	6	–	13	.316	9	–	15	.375
Purdue	4	–	14	.222	7	–	16	.304
Illinois	2	–	16	.111	5	–	18	.217
Wisconsin	2	–	18	.100	5	–	19	.208
† 2021 Big Ten tournament winner As of March 27, 2021; Rankings from AP poll

The 2020–21 Iowa Hawkeyes women's basketball team represented the University of Iowa during the 2020–21 NCAA Division I women's basketball season. The Hawkeyes were led by twenty-first year head coach Lisa Bluder and played their home games at Carver–Hawkeye Arena in Iowa City, IA as members of the Big Ten Conference.

The Hawkeyes finished the season 20–10, 11–8 in Big Ten play to finish in sixth place. They received a bye into the second round of the Big Ten women's tournament, where they defeated Purdue, Rutgers, and Michigan before losing in the final to Maryland. They received an at-large bid to the NCAA tournament. As the five seed in the Riverwalk Regional, they defeated twelve seed Central Michigan and four seed Kentucky before losing to one seed UConn to end their season.

== Previous season ==
The Hawkeyes finished the season 26–4, 14–4 in Big Ten play to finish in third place. In the Big Ten tournament they lost to Ohio State in the first round. They did not get a chance for further post season play, as the NCAA women's basketball tournament and WNIT were cancelled before they began, due to the COVID-19 pandemic.

=== Departures ===
Name	#	Pos.	Height	Year	Hometown	Reason for departure
Mackenzie Meyer	3	G	5'10"	Senior	Mason City, IA	Completed college eligibility
Kathleen Doyle	22	G	5'9"	Senior	La Grange Park, IL	Completed college eligibility/ declared for WNBA draft
Paula Valiño Ramos	31	F/C	6'3"	Junior	Ourense, Spain	
Amanda Ollinger	43	F	6'1"	Senior	Cedar Rapids, IA	Completed college eligibility

=== Recruits ===
College recruiting
Name	Hometown	School	Height	Weight	Commit date
Caitlin Clark; PG	West Des Moines, IA	Dowling Catholic	5 ft 11 in (1.80 m)	N/A	Nov 12, 2019
Caitlin Clark; PG	Recruit ratings: ESPN: (98)				
Sharon Goodman; P	Cresco, IA	Crestwood	6 ft 3 in (1.91 m)	N/A	Aug 25, 2018
Sharon Goodman; P	Recruit ratings: ESPN: (90)				
Shateah Wetering; W	Montezuma, IA	Montezuma Community	6 ft 0 in (1.83 m)	N/A	Dec 31, 2018
Shateah Wetering; W	Recruit ratings: ESPN: (90)				
Lauren Jensen; G	Lakeville, MN	Lakeville North	5 ft 10 in (1.78 m)	N/A	Mar 18, 2019
Lauren Jensen; G	Recruit ratings: ESPN: (89)				
Overall recruit ranking: ESPN: 15
Note: In many cases, Scout, Rivals, 247Sports, On3, and ESPN may conflict in their listings of height and weight.; In these cases, the average was taken. ESPN grades are on a 100-point scale.; Sources: "2020 Player Commits". ESPN. Archived from the original on March 23, 2024.

== Roster ==
2020–21 Iowa Hawkeyes women's basketball team
Players
Coaches

Pos.	#	Name	Height	Year	Previous school	Hometown
G	1	Tomi Taiwo	5 ft 10 in (1.78 m)	Jr	Carmel	Carmel, IN
G	5	Alexis Sevillian (C)	5 ft 5 in (1.65 m)	RS Sr	Goodrich	Goodrich, MI
G	11	Megan Meyer	5 ft 8 in (1.73 m)	So	Mason City	Mason City, IA
F	13	Shateah Wetering	6 ft 0 in (1.83 m)	Fr	Montezuma	Montezuma, IA
G/F	14	McKenna Warnock	6 ft 1 in (1.85 m)	So	Monona Grove	Marshall, WI
G	15	Lauren Jensen	5 ft 10 in (1.78 m)	Fr	Lakeville North	Lakeville, MN
G	20	Kate Martin (C)	6 ft 0 in (1.83 m)	RS So	Edwardsville	Edwardsville, IL
G	21	Zion Sanders (C,W)	5 ft 8 in (1.73 m)	Sr	Central	Evansville, IN
G	22	Caitlin Clark	6 ft 0 in (1.83 m)	Fr	Dowling Catholic	West Des Moines, IA
F	23	Logan Cook	6 ft 1 in (1.85 m)	Jr	Iowa City West	Iowa City, IA
G	24	Gabbie Marshall	5 ft 9 in (1.75 m)	So	Mount Notre Dame	Cincinnati, OH
F/C	25	Monika Czinano	6 ft 3 in (1.91 m)	Jr	Watertown-Mayer	Watertown, MN
C	40	Sharon Goodman	6 ft 3 in (1.91 m)	Fr	Crestwood	Lime Springs, IA

Head coach

- Lisa Bluder (Northern Iowa)

Assistant coach(es)

- Jan Jensen (Drake)
- Raina Harmon (Central Michigan)
- Abby Stamp (Iowa)

Legend

- (C) Team captain
- (S) Suspended
- (I) Ineligible
- (W) Walk-on
- Injured
- Current redshirt

Roster
Last update: June 18, 2021

== Schedule and results ==
Date time, TV	Rank^{#}	Opponent^{#}	Result	Record	High points	High rebounds	High assists	Site city, state
Regular season
November 25, 2020*; 6:30 p.m.		Northern Iowa	W 96–81	1–0	27 – Clark	13 – Warnock	6 – Warnock	Carver–Hawkeye Arena (365); Iowa City, IA
December 2, 2020*; 6:00 p.m.		at Drake	W 103–97	2–0	30 – Clark	8 – Warnock	13 – Clark	Knapp Center (116); Des Moines, IA
December 5, 2020; 2:00 p.m.		Wisconsin	W 85–78	3–0 (1–0)	23 – Clark	9 – Czinano	6 – Martin	Carver–Hawkeye Arena (325); Iowa City, IA
December 9, 2020*; 6:30 p.m.		Iowa State; Iowa Corn Cy-Hawk Series	W 82–80	4–0	34 – Clark	7 – Tied	6 – Clark	Carver–Hawkeye Arena (326); Iowa City, IA
December 12, 2020; 3:00 p.m.		at Michigan State	L 82–86	4–1 (1–1)	35 – Clark	12 – Warnock	6 – Warnock	Breslin Center (0); East Lansing, MI
December 22, 2020*; 1:00 p.m.		Western Illinois	W 92–65	5–1	19 – Czinano	13 – Clark	10 – Clark	Carver–Hawkeye Arena (344); Iowa City, IA
December 31, 2020; 2:00 p.m.		Rutgers	W 90–84	6–1 (2–1)	28 – Clark	9 – Warnock	6 – Tied	Carver–Hawkeye Arena (328); Iowa City, IA
January 3, 2021; 1:00 p.m.		at Illinois	W 107–68	7–1 (3–1)	21 – Clark	7 – Tied	4 – Tied	State Farm Center (0); Champaign, IL
January 6, 2021; 6:00 p.m.		Minnesota	W 92–79	8–1 (4–1)	37 – Clark	11 – Clark	5 – Clark	Carver–Hawkeye Arena (296); Iowa City, IA
January 9, 2021; 6:00 p.m.		at No. 22 Northwestern	L 67–77	8–2 (4–2)	28 – Czinano	17 – Warnock	8 – Clark	Welsh–Ryan Arena (0); Evanston, IL
January 13, 2021; 3:00 p.m.		No. 15 Ohio State	L 82–84 ^{OT}	8–3 (4–3)	27 – Clark	12 – Warnock	5 – Tied	Carver–Hawkeye Arena (326); Iowa City, IA
January 18, 2021; 3:30 p.m.		Purdue	W 87–81	9–3 (5–3)	26 – Clark	9 – Tied	5 – Czinano	Carver–Hawkeye Arena (293); Iowa City, IA
January 21, 2021; 4:00 p.m.		at Maryland	Postponed					Xfinity Center; College Park, MD
January 23, 2021; 3:00 p.m.		at Rutgers	Postponed					Louis Brown Athletic Center; Piscataway, NJ
January 28, 2021; 5:00 p.m.		No. 23 Northwestern	L 80–87	9–4 (5–4)	34 – Czinano	14 – Warnock	8 – Clark	Carver–Hawkeye Arena (264); Iowa City, IA
January 31, 2021; 4:00 p.m.		at Minnesota	W 94–68	10–4 (6–4)	23 – Czinano	10 – Warnock	11 – Clark	Williams Arena (0); Minneapolis, MN
February 4, 2021; 5:00 p.m.		at No. 11 Ohio State	L 87–92	10–5 (6–5)	30 – Clark	6 – Czinano	9 – Clark	Value City Arena (54); Columbus, OH
February 7, 2021; 1:00 p.m.		No. 17 Indiana	L 72–85	10–6 (6–6)	30 – Clark	15 – Warnock	4 – Tied	Carver–Hawkeye Arena (265); Iowa City, IA
February 11, 2021; 7:00 p.m.		at Nebraska	W 88–81	11–6 (7–6)	39 – Clark	10 – Clark	9 – Clark	Pinnacle Bank Arena (0); Lincoln, NE
February 18, 2021; 3:00 p.m.		Penn State	W 96–78	12–6 (8–6)	32 – Clark	8 – Czinano	11 – Martin	Carver–Hawkeye Arena (274); Iowa City, IA
February 21, 2021; TBA		at Indiana	Postponed					Simon Skjodt Assembly Hall; Bloomington, IN
February 23, 2021; Noon		at No. 8 Maryland	L 93–111	12–7 (8–7)	34 – Clark	5 – Czinano	7 – Clark	Xfinity Center (0); College Park, MD
February 25, 2021; 3:30 p.m.		No. 12 Michigan	W 89–67	13–7 (9–7)	27 – Clark	5 – Clark	9 – Clark	Carver–Hawkeye Arena (332); Iowa City, IA
February 28, 2021; 2:00 p.m.		at Wisconsin	W 84–70	14–7 (10–7)	19 – Marshall	7 – Clark	14 – Clark	Kohl Center (0); Madison, WI
March 3, 2021; 3:30 p.m.		at No. 10 Indiana	L 80–89	14–8 (10–8)	32 – Clark	6 – Czinano	5 – Tied	Simon Skjodt Assembly Hall (0); Bloomington, IN
March 6, 2021; 7:00 p.m.		Nebraska	W 83–75	15–8 (11–8)	35 – Clark	8 – Tied	5 – Martin	Carver–Hawkeye Arena (301); Iowa City, IA
Big Ten Women's Tournament
March 10, 2021; 7:30 p.m., FS2	(6)	vs. (11) Purdue; Second Round	W 83–72	16–8	38 – Czinano	9 – Czinano	9 – Clark	Bankers Life Fieldhouse (1,064); Indianapolis, IN
March 11, 2021; 8:00 p.m., FS2	(6)	vs. (3) No. 19 Rutgers; Quarterfinals	W 73–62	17–8	27 – Marshall	12 – Warnock	10 – Clark	Bankers Life Fieldhouse (0); Indianapolis, IN
March 12, 2021; 3:00 p.m., FS2	(6)	vs. (7) Michigan State; Semifinals	W 87–72	18–8	27 – Czinano	11 – Warnock	11 – Clark	Bankers Life Fieldhouse (0); Indianapolis, IN
March 13, 2021; 1:00 p.m., ESPNU	(6)	vs. (1) No. 7 Maryland; Final	L 84–104	18–9	22 – Czinano	10 – Warnock	7 – Clark	Bankers Life Fieldhouse (1,202); Indianapolis, IN
NCAA tournament
March 21, 2021; 11:00 p.m., ESPN	(5 R)	vs. (12 R) Central Michigan; First Round	W 87–72	19–9	23 – Tied	10 – Warnock	7 – Clark	Alamodome (0); San Antonio, TX
March 23, 2021; 2:30 p.m., ESPNU	(5 R)	vs. (4 R) No. 18 Kentucky; Second Round	W 86–72	20–9	35 – Clark	8 – Tied	6 – Clark	Bill Greehey Arena (0); San Antonio, TX
March 27, 2021; Noon, ABC	(5 A)	vs. (1 A) No. 1 UConn; Sweet Sixteen	L 72–92	20–10	21 – Clark	5 – Tied	5 – Tied	Alamodome (0); San Antonio, TX
*Non-conference game. ^{#}Rankings from AP Poll. (#) Tournament seedings in parentheses. R=River Walk. All times are in Central Time.

== Rankings ==
Regular season polls
Poll	Pre- season	Week 2	Week 3	Week 4	Week 5	Week 6	Week 7	Week 8	Week 9	Week 10	Week 11	Week 12	Week 13	Week 14	Week 15	Week 16	Final
AP				RV	RV	RV	RV	RV							RV	RV	RV
Coaches	RV	RV	RV	RV	RV	RV	RV	RV	RV	RV	RV	RV	RV	RV	RV	RV	19

Legend
	Increase in ranking
	Decrease in ranking
	Not ranked previous week
(RV)	Received votes
(NR)	Not ranked and did not receive votes

The Coaches Poll did not release a Week 2 poll, and the AP Poll did not release a poll after the NCAA Tournament.

== See also ==
- 2020–21 Iowa Hawkeyes men's basketball team
