= 2011 Big Ten women's basketball tournament =

- Classification: Division I
- Teams: 11
- Site: Conseco Fieldhouse; Indianapolis, Indiana
- Champions: Ohio State (Fourth title)
- Winning coach: Jim Foster (Fourth title)
- MVP: Jantel Lavender (Ohio State)
- Television: BTN and ESPN2

2010–11 Big Ten women's basketball standings
	Conf.				Overall
Team	W		L	PCT	W		L	PCT
No. 12 Michigan State	13	–	3	.813	25	–	9	.735
Penn State	11	–	5	.688	25	–	10	.714
No. 18 Ohio State †	10	–	6	.625	24	–	10	.706
Iowa	10	–	6	.625	22	–	9	.710
Michigan	10	–	6	.625	17	–	13	.567
Wisconsin	10	–	6	.625	16	–	15	.516
Purdue	9	–	7	.563	21	–	12	.636
Northwestern	6	–	10	.375	19	–	14	.576
Minnesota	4	–	12	.250	12	–	18	.400
Indiana	3	–	13	.188	9	–	20	.310
Illinois	2	–	14	.125	9	–	23	.281
† 2011 Big Ten tournament winner Rankings from AP poll

The 2011 Big Ten Women's Basketball Tournament was played between Thursday, March 3 and Sunday, March 6 at the Conseco Fieldhouse in Indianapolis, Indiana. The Big Ten Network carried every game except the final, which was aired on ESPN2. Ohio State won the tournament and received an automatic bid to the 2011 Women's NCAA tournament.

== Seeds ==
All Big Ten schools participated in the tournament. Teams were seeded by 2010–11 Big Ten Conference season record, with a tiebreaker system to seed teams with identical conference records (Tie-breaking Procedure. The top 5 teams received a first round bye.

The seeding for the tournament was as follows:

Seed	School	Conf	Overall	Tiebreaker
#1	Michigan State	13–3	25–4	
#2	Penn State	11–5	22–8	
#3	Michigan	10–6	17–11	5–0 vs. IOWA/OSU/WISC
#4	Iowa	10–6	22–7	2–2 vs. MICH/OSU/WISC
#5	Ohio State	10–6	19–9	2–3 vs. MICH/IOWA/WISC
#6	Wisconsin	10–6	15–14	0–4 vs. MICH/IOWA/OSU
#7	Purdue	9–7	20–10	
#8	Northwestern	6–10	18–12	
#9	Minnesota	4–12	12–18	
#10	Indiana	3–13	9–20	
#11	Illinois	2–14	8–22	

== Schedule ==
Session	Game	Time*	Matchup^{#}	Television	Score
First Round - Thursday, March 3
1	1	2:00pm	#7 Purdue vs #10 Indiana	BTN	66–62
1	2	4:30pm	#6 Wisconsin vs #11 Illinois	BTN	63–56
1	3	7:00pm	#8 Northwestern vs #9 Minnesota	BTN	53–44
Quarterfinals - Friday, March 4
2	4	11:30am	#2 Penn State vs #7 Purdue	BTN	73–61
2	5	2:00pm	#3 Michigan vs #11 Illinois	BTN	55–47
3	6	6:00pm	#1 Michigan State vs #8 Northwestern	BTN	56–25
3	7	8:30pm	#4 Iowa vs #5 Ohio State	BTN	71–61
Semifinals - Saturday, March 5
4	8	5:00pm	#2 Penn State vs #11 Illinois	BTN	79–64
4	9	7:30pm	#1 Michigan State vs #5 Ohio State	BTN	72–57
Championship Game - Sunday, March 6
5	10	3:30pm	#2 Penn State vs #5 Ohio State	ESPN2	84–70
*Game Times in ET. #-Rankings denote tournament seeding.

== Bracket ==
First round Thursday, March 3
8	Northwestern	53
9	Minnesota	44
7	Purdue	66
10	Indiana	62
6	Wisconsin	56
11	Illinois	63

Quarterfinals; Friday, March 4
1	Michigan State	56
8	Northwestern	25
4	Iowa	61
5	Ohio State	71
2	Penn State	73
7	Purdue	61
3	Michigan	47
11	Illinois	55

Semifinals; Saturday, March 5
1	Michigan State	57
5	Ohio State	72
2	Penn State	79
11	Illinois	64

Championship Game; Sunday, March 6
5	Ohio State	84
2	Penn State	70

All game times are ET.
