= Lisa Bluder =

American basketball player and coach (born 1961)

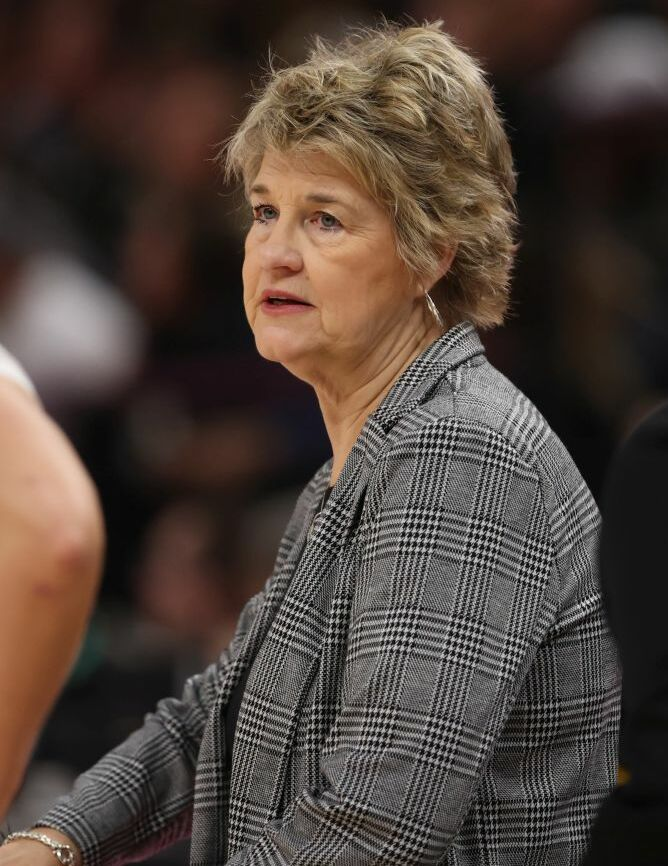
- Bluder during the 2023 Big Ten women's basketball tournament

Biographical details
- Born: April 16, 1961 (age 65); Appleton, Wisconsin, U.S.

Playing career
- 1979–1983: Northern Iowa
- Position: Power forward

Coaching career (HC unless noted)
- 1984–1990: St. Ambrose
- 1990–2000: Drake
- 2000–2024: Iowa

Head coaching record
- Overall: 889–394 (.693)

Accomplishments and honors

Championships
- 2 NCAA Division I regional – Final Four (2023, 2024); 5 Big Ten tournament (2001, 2019, 2022–2024); 2 Big Ten regular season (2008, 2022); 4 MVC tournament (1995, 1997, 1998, 2000); 3 MVC regular season (1997, 1998, 2000)

Awards
- 3× Big Ten Coach of the Year (2001, 2008, 2010); Naismith College Coach of the Year (2019)
Medal record
Women's basketball
Assistant Coach for United States
World University Games
Gold medal – first place	2001 Beijing, China	National Team
Head Coach for United States
Pan American Games
Silver medal – second place	2015 Toronto, Canada	National Team

Lisa Marie Bluder (née Geske, born April 16, 1961) is the former head coach of the Iowa Hawkeyes women's basketball program. Formerly, she served as coach of St. Ambrose University and the Drake Bulldogs.

Bluder notably led Iowa to two NCAA national championship games, in 2023 and 2024. During this time, Bluder led the program through the Caitlin Clark era, which was characterized with an intense and explosive rise in popularity for NCAA Division I Women's Basketball, particularly due to Clark's play. The Hawkeyes lost to LSU in the former year and South Carolina in the latter.

On May 13, 2024, Bluder announced her retirement.

== Early life ==
Bluder attended Linn-Mar High School and graduated in 1979. She went on to study at, and graduate from, the University of Northern Iowa in 1983.

== Coaching career ==
=== St. Ambrose University ===
She began her coaching career at St. Ambrose University, where she coached six successful seasons building the Bees into an NAIA powerhouse. During her tenure at St. Ambrose, she recorded a 169–36 (.824) mark and guided the Bees to four straight national tournaments, including two consecutive Final Four appearances. The 1990 St. Ambrose team was ranked No. 1 and she was named the NAIA Converse Coach of the Year.

=== Drake University ===
Bluder compiled a 187–106 (.638) record at Drake in 10 seasons and a 169–36 (.824) record in six seasons at NAIA St. Ambrose University. She currently sits 39th in career winning percentage (.692) for Division I active coaches.

=== University of Iowa ===
Bluder, alongside her husband David and daughter Hannah, was introduced as the Hawkeyes' fifth head coach in front of a packed press room in Carver-Hawkeye Arena on April 7, 2000. The native of Marion, Iowa, came to Iowa after spending 10 successful seasons at Drake University.

Bluder, the all-time winningest coach in program history, spent 24 years as the head women's basketball head coach at the University of Iowa. The Hawkeyes posted a winning record in 23 of her 24 years at Iowa, including 18 upper-division finishes in the Big Ten Conference.

The Hawkeyes made 22 postseason appearances (18 NCAA and four WNIT) under Coach Bluder, including NCAA Tournament berths in 14 of her last 16 seasons. Iowa advanced to the postseason in 16 consecutive seasons (14 NCAA and two WNIT) when a postseason tournament was held. The 2020 pandemic cut the 2019–20 season short, resulting in the only missed tournament season in the 16 year span.

Her 528 wins at Iowa are the most of any Hawkeye women's basketball coach, passing Hall of Famer C. Vivian Stringer (269 wins).

Bluder is a three-time Big Ten Coach of the Year (2001, 2008 and 2010) and two-time WBCA Regional Coach of the Year (2001 and 2008). She guided Iowa to a season with at least 20-wins in 17 of her 24 years at Iowa, including 15 of the last 17 years.

Bluder had one of her most successful seasons in 2010–11, leading Iowa to a 22–9 overall record and a third-place finish in the Big Ten at 10–6. Iowa's overall win–loss record in 2010–11 was the best for an Iowa team since the 2004-2005 campaign. The Hawkeyes were nationally ranked for 14 weeks during the season, reaching No. 14 in the Associated Press Poll and No. 13 in the ESPN/USA Today Coaches Poll. Iowa received an at-large berth into the NCAA Tournament for the fourth-straight season.

Another one of Bluder's best seasons was the 2018–19 season with her star player Megan Gustafson who would later go onto the WNBA with the Dallas Wings. They finished with a 29–7 record; with a Big Ten tournament Championship and a trip to the Elite Eight in the 2019 NCAA Tournament. They finished No. 8 in the Postseason AP Top 25.

On April 6, 2019, Bluder was named the Naismith College Coach of the Year.

With star player Caitlin Clark on the team, Bluder coached the 2021-22 Hawkeyes to Iowa’s first ever Big Ten regular-season title and Big Ten Tournament Championship in the same year. She coached the 2022-23 Hawkeyes to their first Final Four since 1993 and first National Championship appearance in program history. She coached the 2023-24 Hawkeyes to their second National Championship appearance in program history. Iowa was the first Big Ten team to play in back-to-back National Championship’s in conference history.

=== Career milestones ===
She has reached five coaching milestones while coaching Iowa. During her first season, she collected her 200th victory at the Division I level when the Hawkeyes defeated Minnesota. She garnered win No. 300 at the Division I level with Iowa's regular season finale win over Indiana in 2006. During her third season, she captured career win No. 400 in Iowa's triumph over Iowa State and victory No. 450 when Iowa topped Creighton in the first round of the WNIT. During the '07–'08 season her Hawkeyes defeated Penn State on February 10 to give Coach Bluder career win No. 500. When Iowa beat Purdue on January 20, 2013, Coach Bluder made that her Career win No. 600.

She is also committed to her team's academic success. She coached two Academic All-America Players of the Year in current Hawkeye Associate Head Coach Jan Jensen (1991) and Tricia Wakely (1996). As a team, the Bulldogs ranked fourth in 1995 graduation rate success among teams ranked in the USA Today/CNN final top-25 Coaches' Poll. In 2004 and 2012, a team record eight student athletes were named to the academic all-Big Ten team. Student athletes who have played under her have a 100 percent job placement following their career, and all of her recruited athletes have earned their degree.

== USA Basketball ==
Bluder was the head coach of the U.S.A. women's basketball team at the 2015 Pan American Games. The event was held in Toronto, Canada from July 16–20, 2015. Bluder's USA team had a strong roster, including 2015 All-Americans Breanna Stewart, Moriah Jefferson, and Tiffany Mitchell. The USA team secured a 75–69 win over Brazil in its opening game, followed by a lopsided 94–55 win over Dominican Republic in the second round. In its final preliminary round game, the USA outscored Puerto Rico 93–77 to secure a number one seed heading into the medal semifinals. Bluder's team survived a close semi-final game against Cuba with a 65–64 win that advanced the USA into the gold medal game. The USA team led Canada in the championship game by as much as 11 points early on, but a strong third quarter by Canada gave them the lead, and an eventual 81–73 win over the USA women. Bluder and her team returned home from Toronto with a silver medal.

Bluder served as an assistant coach of the USA representative to the 1999 World University Games (also known as the Universiade). The event was held in Palma de Mallorca, Spain. The USA team opened with a 134–37 win over South Africa. The second game was against Canada, which the USA team lost in a close match 68–67. The USA could not afford to lose another game if they wished to win a medal, and won the next game against Japan 106–66. The USA next faced undefeated Russia, and fell behind by twelve points at halftime, but came back and won the game 79–68. The USA fell behind in their next game against undefeated China, but rallied and went on to win 89–78. The USA then beat Brazil to advance to the semi-final, where they faced Lithuania. The game was not close, with the USA winning 70–49. That set up a rematch with China, on their home court with 18,000 spectators. The USA only had a four-point lead at halftime, but did better in the second half, and won 87–69 to claim the gold medal. Ayana Walker set a World University Games record with 19 rebounds in the game. Walker was the leading scorer and rebounder for the USA team with 15.4 points and 8.6 rebounds per game.

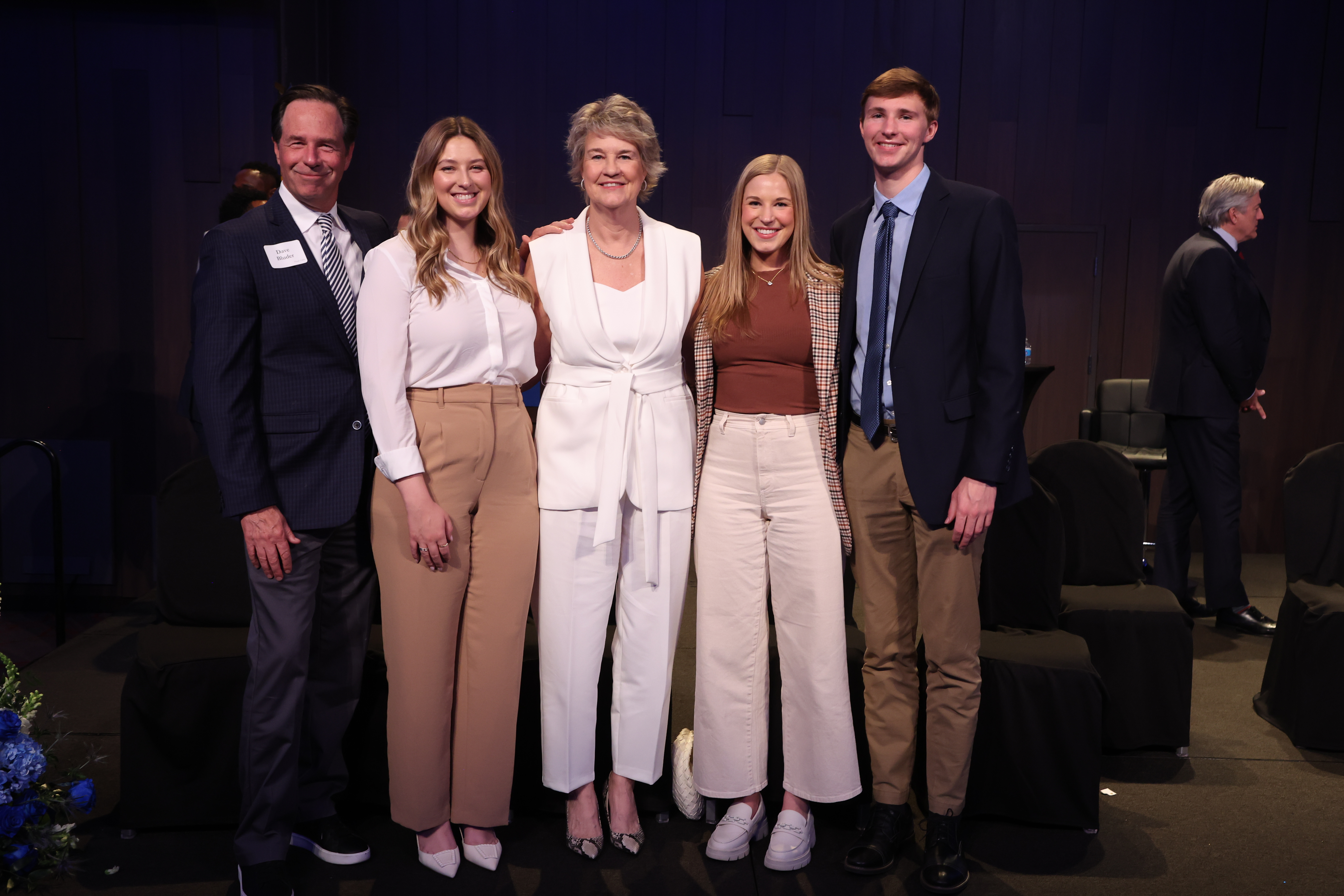
Bluder with her family in 2024.

== Personal life ==
Bluder is married to David Bluder, a banker and author. The couple have three children, including Hannah who worked under her mother as the team's director of operations.

== Head coaching record ==
Drake was awarded a forfeit victory over Valparaiso during the 1995–96 season due to Valparaiso's use of an ineligible player. Drake originally lost that game 79–80. Drake recognizes that game as a victory, but the NCAA does not, thus the NCAA statistics database includes a record of 15–14 for that year.

Record table
Season	Team	Overall	Conference	Standing	Postseason
St. Ambrose Fighting Bees () (1984–1990)
1984–85	St. Ambrose	18–13			
1985–86	St. Ambrose	20–12			
1986–87	St. Ambrose	29–3			NAIA Second Round
1987–88	St. Ambrose	32–5			NAIA Second Round
1988–89	St. Ambrose	36–2			NAIA Fab Four
1989–90	St. Ambrose	34–1			NAIA Fab Four
St. Ambrose:		169–36 (.824)			
Drake Bulldogs (Gateway Collegiate Athletic Conference) (1990–1993)
1990–91	Drake	13–17	10–8	4th	
1991–92	Drake	11–15	7–11	T-6th	
1992–93	Drake	15–13	8–8	T-4th	
Drake Bulldogs (Missouri Valley Conference) (1993–2000)
1993–94	Drake	16–12	8–8	5th	
1994–95	Drake	25–6	13–5	T-2nd	NCAA Second Round
1995–96	Drake	16–13	10–8	T-4th	
1996–97	Drake	23–7	14–4	1st	NCAA First Round
1997–98	Drake	25–5	17–1	1st	NCAA First Round
1998–99	Drake	21–10	14–4	2nd	WNIT Semifinals
1999–00	Drake	23–7	15–3	1st	NCAA First Round
Drake:		188–105 (.642)	116–60 (.659)		
Iowa Hawkeyes (Big Ten Conference) (2000–2024)
2000–01	Iowa	21–10	12–4	2nd	NCAA Second Round
2001–02	Iowa	18–11	10–6	4th	NCAA Second Round
2002–03	Iowa	18–15	6–10	7th	WNIT Third Round
2003–04	Iowa	16–13	10–6	T-4th	NCAA First Round
2004–05	Iowa	23–10	8–8	6th	WNIT Semifinals
2005–06	Iowa	17–12	10–6	5th	NCAA First Round
2006–07	Iowa	14–16	6–10	9th	
2007–08	Iowa	21–11	13–5	T-1st	NCAA First Round
2008–09	Iowa	21–11	13–5	T-2nd	NCAA First Round
2009–10	Iowa	20–14	10–8	3rd	NCAA Second Round
2010–11	Iowa	22–9	10–6	3rd	NCAA First Round
2011–12	Iowa	19–12	11–5	T-2nd	NCAA First Round
2012–13	Iowa	21–13	8–8	7th	NCAA Second Round
2013–14	Iowa	27–9	11–5	T-4th	NCAA Second Round
2014–15	Iowa	26–8	14–4	2nd	NCAA Sweet Sixteen
2015–16	Iowa	19–14	8–10	T-9th	WNIT First Round
2016–17	Iowa	20–14	8–8	T-8th	WNIT Quarterfinals
2017–18	Iowa	24–8	11–5	T-3rd	NCAA First Round
2018–19	Iowa	29–7	14–4	2nd	NCAA Elite Eight
2019–20	Iowa	23–7	14–4	2nd	Postseason not held due to COVID-19
2020–21	Iowa	20–10	11–8	5th	NCAA Sweet Sixteen
2021–22	Iowa	24–8	14–4	T-1st	NCAA Second Round
2022–23	Iowa	31–7	15–3	T-2nd	NCAA Runner-up
2023–24	Iowa	34–5	15–3	T-2nd	NCAA Runner-up
Iowa:		528–254 (.675)	262–145 (.644)		
Total:		885–394 (.692)			
National champion Postseason invitational champion Conference regular season champion Conference regular season and conference tournament champion Division regular season champion Division regular season and conference tournament champion Conference tournament champion

== See also ==
- List of college women's basketball career coaching wins leaders
