= Samantha Logic =

American basketball player (born 1992)

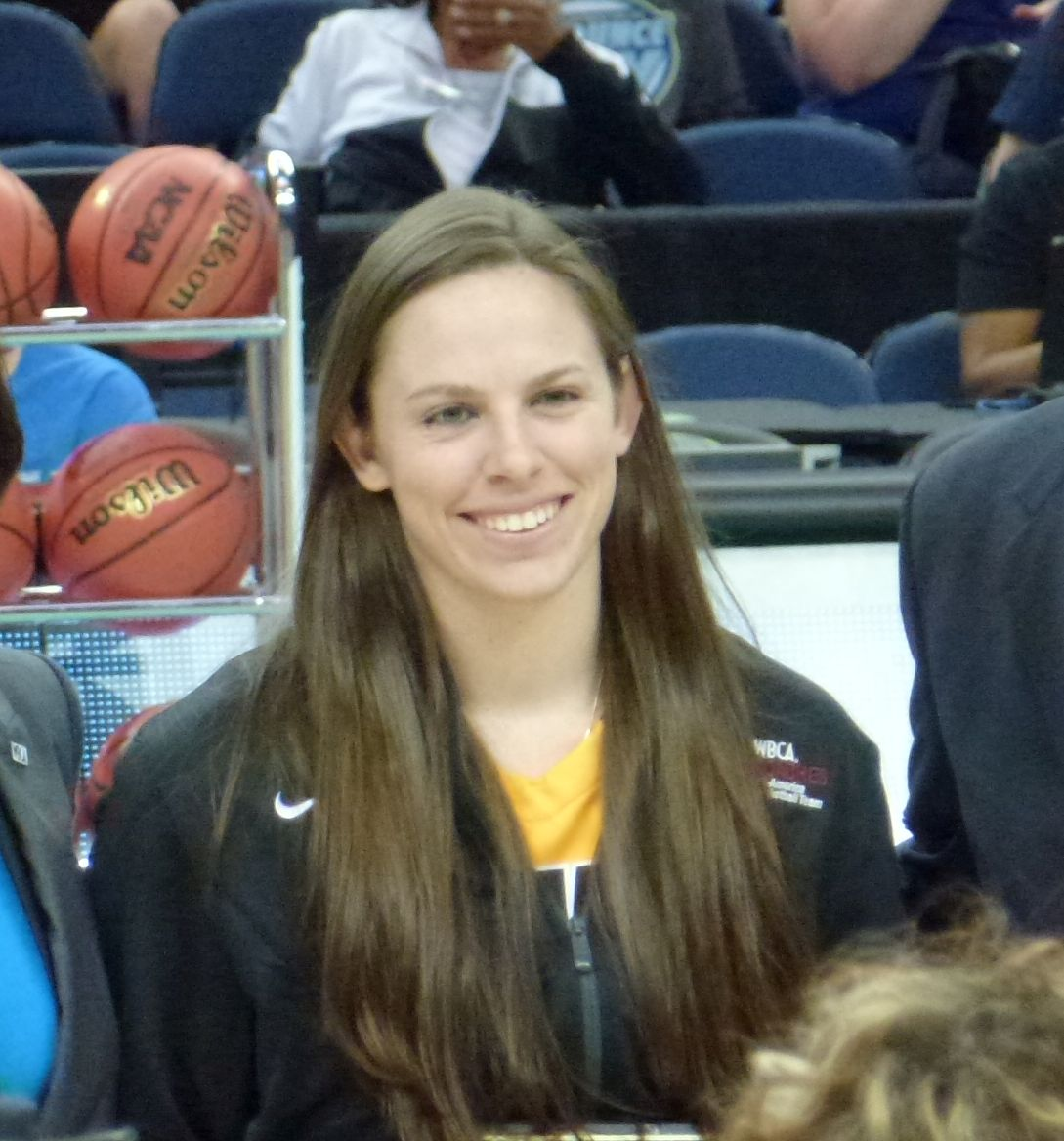

Marquette Golden Eagles
- Title: Assistant coach
- Conference: Big East Conference

Personal information
- Born: October 22, 1992 (age 34) Racine, Wisconsin, U.S.
- Listed height: 5 ft 9 in (1.75 m)

Career information
- High school: J. I. Case (Mount Pleasant, Wisconsin)
- College: Iowa (2011–2015)
- WNBA draft: 2015: 1st round, 10th overall pick
- Drafted by: Atlanta Dream
- Playing career: 2015–2017
- Position: Point guard
- Number: 22
- Coaching career: 2025–present

Career history

Playing
- 2015: Atlanta Dream
- 2015: San Antonio Stars
- 2015–2016: Cote d'Opale Basket
- 2016–2017: Adelaide Lightning

Coaching
- 2025–present: Marquette (assistant)

Career highlights
- All-American – USBWA (2015); Third-team All-American – AP (2015); WBCA Coaches' All-American (2015); Senior CLASS Award (2015); 2× First-team All-Big Ten (2014, 2015); Big Ten All-Freshman Team (2012); McDonald's All-American (2011); Wisconsin Miss Basketball (2011)
- Stats at Basketball Reference

Samantha Logic (born October 22, 1992) is an American former basketball player.

She played college basketball at the University of Iowa. A 5'9" point guard from Racine, Wisconsin, Logic played for the Hawkeyes from 2011 to 2015, earning All-American honors in her senior season. She was named a third-team All-American by the Associated Press and a first-team All-American by the United States Basketball Writers Association after averaging 13.4 points, 7.0 rebounds and 8.1 assists per game. Logic also received the Senior CLASS Award for the 2014–15 season.

After college, she was drafted tenth overall by the Atlanta Dream of the WNBA, before being traded to the San Antonio Stars.

== WNBA draft 2015 ==
Logic was one of 12 players selected by the WNBA to attend the 2015 draft. She is the first player from the University of Iowa to be invited to attend the event. Logic was chosen by the Atlanta dream as the 10th choice in the 2015 WNBA draft. She was subsequently traded to the San Antonio Stars for a 2016 second round draft pick.

== Career statistics ==
=== WNBA ===
Legend
GP	Games played	GS	Games started	MPG	Minutes per game	RPG	Rebounds per game
APG	Assists per game	SPG	Steals per game	BPG	Blocks per game	PPG	Points per game
TO	Turnovers per game	FG%	Field-goal percentage	3P%	3-point field-goal percentage	FT%	Free-throw percentage
**Bold**	Career best	°	League leader

=== Regular season ===
WNBA regular season statistics
Year	Team	GP	GS	MPG	FG%	3P%	FT%	RPG	APG	SPG	BPG	TO	PPG
2015	Atlanta	4	0	5.8	9.1	12.5	13.6	0.8	0.5	0.3	0.0	**0.3**	0.8
2015	San Antonio	**23**	0	**13.9**	**26.6**	**21.7**	**85.7**	**1.5**	**1.3**	0.3	**0.3**	1.0	**2.0**
**Career**	1 year, 2 teams	27	0	12.7	24.0	19.4	85.7	1.4	1.1	0.3	0.3	0.9	1.8

=== College ===
NCAA statistics
Year	Team	GP	Points	FG%	3P%	FT%	RPG	APG	SPG	BPG	PPG
2011–12	Iowa	31	292	41.8	30.6	74.7	**7.1**	4.4	1.5	0.2	9.4
2012–13	Iowa	34	321	46.6	29.4	65.9	6.7	6.4	1.8	**0.4**	9.4
2013–14	Iowa	**36**	**477**	**49.1**	**35.7**	**76.4**	6.6	7.5	**2.4**	0.2	13.3
2014–15	Iowa	34	456	48.4	32.6	69.4	7.0	**8.1**	1.9	**0.4**	**13.4**
**Career**		135	1546	46.8	32.6	72.1	6.8	6.7	1.9	0.3	11.5

== See also ==
- List of NCAA Division I basketball career triple-doubles leaders
