= 2012 Big Ten women's basketball tournament =

- Classification: Division I
- Teams: 12
- Site: Bankers Life Fieldhouse; Indianapolis, Indiana
- Champions: Purdue (8th title)
- Winning coach: Sharon Versyp (3rd title)
- Television: BTN and ESPN2

2011–12 Big Ten women's basketball standings
	Conf.				Overall
Team	W		L	PCT	W		L	PCT
No. 11 Penn State	13	–	3	.813	26	–	7	.788
No. 13 Purdue †	11	–	5	.688	25	–	9	.735
No. 16 Ohio State	11	–	5	.688	25	–	7	.781
Michigan State	11	–	5	.688	20	–	12	.625
Iowa	11	–	5	.688	19	–	12	.613
No. 17 Nebraska	10	–	6	.625	24	–	9	.727
Michigan	8	–	8	.500	20	–	12	.625
Minnesota	6	–	10	.375	19	–	17	.528
Illinois	5	–	11	.313	11	–	19	.367
Wisconsin	5	–	11	.313	9	–	20	.310
Northwestern	4	–	12	.250	14	–	16	.467
Indiana	1	–	15	.063	6	–	24	.200
† 2012 Big Ten tournament winner Rankings from AP poll

The 2012 Big Ten women's basketball tournament was held from March 1 to March 4 at the Bankers Life Fieldhouse in Indianapolis, Indiana. The tournament marked the debut of the University of Nebraska. The Big Ten Network carried all games except the championship game which was aired on ESPN2. Purdue won the tournament and received an automatic bid to the 2012 NCAA tournament.

== Seeds ==
All 12 Big Ten schools participated in the tournament. Teams were seeded by 2011–12 Big Ten Conference women's basketball season record. A new tie-breaking procedure was announced for the 2012 tournament for teams with identical conference records. The top 4 teams would receive a first round bye.

The seeding for the tournament was determined as the conference season concluded:

Seed	School	Conf	1st Tiebreak	2nd Tiebreak	3rd Tiebreak	4th Tiebreak
Seed	School	Conf	Head-to-Head	Win% vs. #1 Seed	Win% vs. All D1	Coin Flip
#1	Penn State	13–3				
#2	Ohio State	11–5	3–0			
#3	Iowa	11–5	2–2			
#4	Purdue	11–5	2–3			
#5	Michigan State	11–5	1–3			
#6	Nebraska	10–6				
#7	Michigan	8–8				
#8	Minnesota	6–10				
#9	Wisconsin	5–11	2–0			
#10	Illinois	5–11	0–2			
#11	Northwestern	4–12				
#12	Indiana	1–15				

== Schedule ==
Session	Game	Time**	Matchup^{#}	Television	Score
First round - Thursday, March 1
1	1	11:30am	#7 Michigan vs. #10 Illinois	BTN	68–53
1	2	2:00pm	#6 Nebraska vs. #11 Northwestern	BTN	88–56
2	3	6:00pm	#8 Minnesota vs. #9 Wisconsin	BTN	81–49
2	4	8:30pm	#5 Michigan State vs. #12 Indiana	BTN	97–68
Quarterfinals - Friday, March 2
3	5	11:30am	#2 Ohio State vs. #7 Michigan	BTN	57–48
3	6	2:00pm	#3 Iowa vs. #6 Nebraska	BTN	68–80
4	7	6:00pm	#1 Penn State vs. #8 Minnesota	BTN	78–74
4	8	8:30pm	#4 Purdue vs. #5 Michigan State	BTN	73–64
Semifinals - Saturday, March 3
5	9	5:00pm	#2 Ohio State vs. #6 Nebraska	BTN	62–77
5	10	7:30pm	#1 Penn State vs. #4 Purdue	BTN	66–68
Championship Game - Sunday, March 4
6	11	4:00pm	#6 Nebraska vs. #4 Purdue	ESPN2	70–74*
* – Denotes overtime **Game Times in ET. #-Rankings denote tournament seeding.

== Bracket ==
First round Thursday, March 1
7	Michigan	68
10	Illinois	53
6	Nebraska	88
11	Northwestern	56
8	Minnesota	81
9	Wisconsin	49
5	Michigan State	97
12	Indiana	68

Quarterfinals; Friday, March 2
2	Ohio State	57
7	Michigan	48
3	Iowa	68
6	Nebraska	80
1	Penn State	78
8	Minnesota	74
4	Purdue	73
5	Michigan State	64

Semifinals; Saturday, March 3
2	Ohio State	62
6	Nebraska	77
1	Penn State	66
4	Purdue	68

Championship game Sunday, March 4
6	Nebraska	70
4	Purdue	74*

All game times are ET.
* – Denotes overtime
