= 2020–21 Maryland Terrapins women's basketball team =

American college basketball season

2020–21 Maryland Terrapins women's basketball
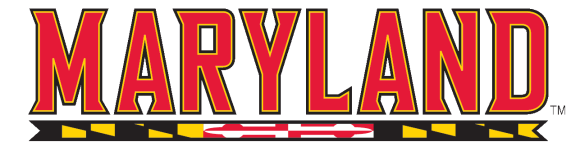

Big Ten regular season and Tournament champions

NCAA tournament, Sweet Sixteen
- Conference: Big Ten Conference

Ranking
- Coaches: No. 8
- AP: No. 7
- Record: 26–3 (17–1 Big Ten)
- Head coach: Brenda Frese (19th season)
- Assistant coaches: Karen Blair (3rd season); Kaitlynn Fratz (3rd season); Lindsey Spann (1st season)
- Home arena: Xfinity Center

2020–21 Big Ten women's basketball standings
	Conf.				Overall
Team	W		L	PCT	W		L	PCT
No. 7 Maryland †	17	–	1	.944	26	–	2	.929
No. 12 Indiana	16	–	2	.889	20	–	5	.800
No. 21 Rutgers	10	–	3	.769	14	–	5	.737
No. 16 Michigan	9	–	4	.692	16	–	6	.727
Northwestern	11	–	7	.611	16	–	9	.640
Iowa	11	–	8	.579	20	–	9	.690
No. 22 Ohio State	9	–	7	.563	13	–	7	.650
Michigan State	8	–	7	.533	15	–	9	.625
Nebraska	9	–	10	.474	13	–	13	.500
Minnesota	7	–	11	.389	8	–	13	.381
Penn State	6	–	13	.316	9	–	15	.375
Purdue	4	–	14	.222	7	–	16	.304
Illinois	2	–	16	.111	5	–	18	.217
Wisconsin	2	–	18	.100	5	–	19	.208
† 2021 Big Ten tournament winner As of March 27, 2021; Rankings from AP poll

The 2020–21 Maryland Terrapins women's basketball team represented the University of Maryland, College Park in 2020–21 NCAA Division I women's basketball season. The Terrapins were led by nineteenth year head coach Brenda Frese and played their home games at the Xfinity Center as members of the Big Ten Conference.

== Previous season ==
The Terrapins finished the 2019–20 season 28–4 (16–2) in Big Ten play to finish tied for 1st place and capturing their 5th Big Ten title. Also winning the Big Ten tournament title for the 4th time in school history.

== Offseason ==
=== 2020 recruiting class ===
College recruiting information
Name	Hometown	School	Height	Weight	Commit date
Taisiya Kozlova; G	Moscow, Russia	Elevation Prep Academy	6 ft 1 in (1.85 m)	N/A	
Taisiya Kozlova; G	Recruit ratings: (96)				
Angel Reese; F/G	Baltimore, MD	St. Frances Academy	6 ft 3 in (1.91 m)	N/A	Nov 1, 2019
Angel Reese; F/G	Recruit ratings: ESPN: (96)				
Overall recruit ranking:
Note: In many cases, Scout, Rivals, 247Sports, On3, and ESPN may conflict in their listings of height and weight.; In these cases, the average was taken. ESPN grades are on a 100-point scale.; Sources:

=== Incoming transfers ===
Name	Pos.	Height	Year	Hometown	Transfer From
Katie Benzan	G	5'6"	Senior	Wellesley, MA	Harvard
Chloe Bibby	F	6'1"	Senior	Warracknabeal, Australia	Mississippi State
Alaysia Styles	F	6'3"	Senior	San Diego, CA	California

=== Player departures ===
Name	Pos.	Height	Year	Hometown	Reason for departure
Shakira Austin	F	6'5"	Sophomore	Fredericksburg, VA	Transferred to Ole Miss
Kaila Charles	G/F	6'1"	Senior	Waldorf, MD	Graduated and selected 2nd round 23rd pick overall 2020 WNBA draft
Stephanie Jones	F	6'2"	Senior	Havre de Grace, MD	Graduated
Taylor Mikesell	G	5'11"	Sophomore	Massillon, OH	Transferred to Oregon
Olivia Owens	C	6'4"	Sophomore	Niskayuna, NY	Transferred to Kentucky
Sara Vujačić	G	5'11"	Senior	Maribor, Slovenia	Graduated
Blair Watson	G	6'0"	Senior	Nutley, NJ	Graduated

=== Awards and honors ===
Coach Brenda Frese voted Big Ten Coach of the Year(coaches/media), National Coach of the Year by ESPN, and AP National Coach of the Year

==== Watch List ====
Award	Player	Position	Year
Ann Meyers Drysdale Award	Ashley Owusu	G	SO
Women's Jersey Mike's Naismith Trophy	Ashley Owusu	G	SO
Wade Trophy	Ashley Owusu	G	SO
Cheryl Miller Award	Angel Reese	F	FR

==== Honors ====
Award	Player	Position	Year
NCAA Women's Basketball All-American Third team	Ashley Owusu	G	SO
All Big Ten Preseason Team	Ashley Owusu	G	SO
All-Big Ten First Team (unanimous) (coaches/media)	Ashley Owusu	G	SO
All-Big Ten First Team (coaches/media)	Diamond Miller	G	SO
NCAA Women's Basketball All-American Honorable mention	Katie Benzan	G	SR
All-Big Ten Second Team (coaches/media)	Katie Benzan	G	SR
All-Big Ten Honorable Mention Team (coaches/media)	Chloe Bibby	F	SR
All-Big Ten Honorable Mention Team (media)	Mimi Collins	F	SO
All-Big Ten Freshman Team (media)	Angel Reese	F	FR
Big Ten Sportsmanship Award	Channise Lewis	G	JR

== Roster ==
2020–21 Maryland Terrapins women's basketball team
Players
Coaches

Pos.	#	Name	Height	Year	Previous school	Hometown
G	11	Katie Benzan	5 ft 6 in (1.68 m)	Sr	Noble and Greenough School; Harvard	Wellesley, MA
F	55	Chloe Bibby	6 ft 1 in (1.85 m)	Sr	Rowville Secondary College; Mississippi State	Warracknabeal, Australia
F	2	Mimi Collins	6 ft 3 in (1.91 m)	RS So	Paul VI Catholic HS; Tennessee	Waldorf, MD
G	14	Taisiya Kozlova	6 ft 1 in (1.85 m)	Fr	Elevation Prep Academy	Moscow, Russia
G	3	Channise Lewis	5 ft 8 in (1.73 m)	RS Jr	Miami Country Day	Miami, FL
F	13	Faith Masonius	6 ft 1 in (1.85 m)	So	Manasquan	Spring Lake, NJ
G	14	Diamond Miller	6 ft 3 in (1.91 m)	So	Franklin	Somerset, NJ
G	15	Ashley Owusu	6 ft 0 in (1.83 m)	So	Paul VI Catholic HS	Woodbridge, VA
F	10	Angel Reese	6 ft 3 in (1.91 m)	Fr	St. Frances Academy	Baltimore, MD
F	5	Alaysia Styles	6 ft 3 in (1.91 m)	Sr	La Jolla Country Day; California	San Diego, CA
G	12	Zoe Young	5 ft 10 in (1.78 m)	RS Fr	West Des Moines Valley	Des Moines, IA

Head coach

- Brenda Frese (Arizona)

Assistant coach(es)

- Karen Blair (SMU)
- Kaitlynn Fratz (California (PA))
- Lindsey Spann (Penn State)

Legend

- (C) Team captain
- (S) Suspended
- (I) Ineligible
- (W) Walk-on
- Injured
- Current redshirt

Roster
Last update: November 16, 2020

== Schedule ==
Date time, TV	Rank^{#}	Opponent^{#}	Result	Record	Site (attendance) city, state
11/27/2020*; 2:30 pm	No. 12	vs. Davidson; Gulf Coast Showcase	W 94–72	1–0	Hertz Arena; Estero, FL
11/28/2020*; 5:30 pm	No. 12	vs. No. 24 Missouri State; Gulf Coast Showcase	L 72–81	1–1	Hertz Arena; Estero, FL
11/29/2020*; 5:30 pm	No. 12	vs. No. 14 Arkansas; Gulf Coast Showcase	W 115–96	2–1	Hertz Arena; Estero, FL
12/3/2020*; 6:00 pm, BTN	No. 14	Towson	W 112–78	3–1	Xfinity Center; College Park, MD
~~12/5/2020~~*; ~~1:00 PM~~, ~~BTN+~~	No. 14	~~Coppin State~~	Cancelled due to COVID-19		~~Xfinity Center~~; ~~College Park, MD~~
~~12/8/2020~~*; ~~1:00 PM~~, ~~BTN+~~	No. 14	~~Mount St. Mary's~~	Cancelled due to COVID-19		~~Xfinity Center~~; ~~College Park, MD~~
12/14/2020; 2:00 pm, BTN+	No. 14	at Rutgers	W 91–87	4–1 (1–0)	Rutgers Athletic Center; Piscataway, NJ
12/19/2020*; 11:00 am, BTN+	No. 14	James Madison	W 101–59	5–1	Xfinity Center; College Park, MD
~~12/23/2020~~; ~~2:00 PM~~ , ~~BTN~~	No. 14	No. 16 ~~Ohio State~~	Cancelled due to COVID-19		~~Xfinity Center~~; ~~College Park, MD~~
12/31/2020; 12:00 pm, BTN	No. 14	at Penn State	W 96–82	6–1 (2–0)	Bryce Jordan Center; University Park, PA
1/4/2021; 7:00 pm, ESPN2	No. 12	No. 19 Indiana	W 84–80	7–1 (3–0)	Xfinity Center; College Park, MD
1/7/2021; 5:00 pm, BTN	No. 12	at No. 23 Michigan State	W 93–87	8–1 (4–0)	Breslin Student Events Center; East Lansing, MI
1/10/2021; 12:00 pm, BTN+	No. 12	Purdue	W 83–46	9–1 (5–0)	Xfinity Center; College Park, MD
1/14/2021; 6:00 pm, BTN	No. 9	at Minnesota	W 90–73	10–1 (6–0)	Williams Arena; Minneapolis, MN
1/17/2021; 3:00 pm, BTN+	No. 9	at Wisconsin	W 79–70	11–1 (7–0)	Kohl Center; Madison, WI
1/25/2021; 7:00 pm, ESPN2	No. 7	at No. 17 Ohio State	L 86–88	11–2 (7–1)	Value City Arena; Columbus, OH
~~1/28/2021~~; ~~4:00 PM~~, ~~BTN~~	No. 7	~~Rutgers~~	Cancelled due to COVID-19		~~Xfinity Center~~; ~~College Park, MD~~
1/28/2021; 4:00 pm, BTN	No. 7	Michigan State	W 92–52	12–2 (8–1)	Xfinity Center; College Park, MD
2/4/2021; 4:00 pm, BTN	No. 10	Wisconsin	W 84–48	13–2 (9–1)	Xfinity Center; College Park, MD
2/7/2021; 2:00 pm, ESPN/ESPN2	No. 10	at Michigan	Postponed due to COVID-19		Crisler Center; Ann Arbor, MI
2/14/2021; 5:00 pm, FS1	No. 10	at Nebraska	W 95–73	14–2 (10–1)	Pinnacle Bank Arena; Lincoln, Nebraska
2/17/2021; 1:00 pm, BTN	No. 9	Illinois	W 103–58	15–2 (11–1)	Xfinity Center; College Park, MD
2/20/2021; 12:00 pm, BTN+	No. 9	Minnesota	W 94–62	16–2 (12–1)	Xfinity Center; College Park, MD
2/23/2021; 1:00 pm, BTN	No. 8	Iowa	W 111–93	17–2 (13–1)	Xfinity Center; College Park, MD
2/25/2021; 6:00 pm, BTN+	No. 8	at Purdue	W 88–59	18–2 (14–1)	Mackey Arena; West Lafayette, IN
2/28/2021; 4:00 pm, ESPN2	No. 8	at Northwestern	W 62–50	19–2 (15–1)	Welsh–Ryan Arena; Evanston, IL
3/4/2021; 12:00 pm, BTN	No. 8	at No. 12 Michigan	W 88–63	20–2 (16–1)	Crisler Center; Ann Arbor, MI
3/6/2021; 3:00 pm, BTN+	No. 8	Penn State	W 88–61	21–2 (17–1)	Xfinity Center; College Park, MD
Big Ten tournament
3/11/2021; 11:00 am, FS2	No. 7	vs. Nebraska; Quarterfinals	W 83–73	22–2	Bankers Life Fieldhouse; Indianapolis, IN
3/12/2021; 2:00 pm, FS2	No. 7	vs. Northwestern; Semifinals	W 85–52	23–2	Bankers Life Fieldhouse; Indianapolis, IN
3/13/2021; 2:00 pm, ESPNU	No. 7	vs. Iowa; Championship	W 104–84	24–2	Bankers Life Fieldhouse; Indianapolis, IN
NCAA Women's Tournament
03/22/2021*; 4:00 pm, ESPN	(2 H)	vs. (15 H) Mount St. Mary's; First Round	W 98–45	25–2	Alamodome; San Antonio, TX
03/24/2021*; 1:00 pm, ESPN2	(2 H)	vs. (7 H) Alabama; Second Round	W 100–64	26–2	Bill Greehey Arena; San Antonio, TX
03/28/2021*; 9:00 pm, ESPN2	(2 H)	vs. (6 H) Texas; Sweet Sixteen	L 61-64	26–3	Alamodome; San Antonio, TX
*Non-conference game. ^{#}Rankings from AP Poll. (#) Tournament seedings in parentheses. All times are in Eastern Time.

== Rankings ==
Ranking movements Legend: ██ Increase in ranking ██ Decrease in ranking
	Week																				
Poll	Pre	1	2	3	4	5	6	7	8	9	10	11	12	13	14	15	16	17	18	19	Final
AP	12		14	14	14	14	14	12	9	7	7	10	9	9	8	8	7	7			
Coaches	11			14	14	14	14	12	9	7	10	10	10	10	8	8	8	8			

*AP does not release post-NCAA Tournament rankings
*Coaches did not release a Week 2 poll.
