= Iowa Hawkeyes women's basketball =

University of Iowa Women's basketball

Iowa Hawkeyes
| 2026–27 Iowa Hawkeyes women's basketball team |
- University: University of Iowa
- Founded: 1974 (51 years ago)
- Athletic director: Beth Goetz
- Head coach: Jan Jensen (3rd season)
- Location: Iowa City, Iowa
- Arena: Carver–Hawkeye Arena (capacity: 14,998)
- Conference: Big Ten
- Nickname: Hawkeyes
- Colors: Black and Gold
- Student section: Hawks Nest

NCAA Division I tournament runner-up
- 2023, 2024
Other NCAA Division I tournament results
| Final Four | 1993, 2023, 2024 |
| Elite Eight | 1987, 1988, 1993, 2019, 2023, 2024 |
| Sweet Sixteen | 1987, 1988, 1989, 1993, 1996, 2015, 2019, 2021, 2023, 2024 |
| Appearances | 1986, 1987, 1988, 1989, 1990, 1991, 1992, 1993, 1994, 1996, 1997, 1998, 2001, 2002, 2004, 2006, 2008, 2009, 2010, 2011, 2012, 2013, 2014, 2015, 2018, 2019, 2021, 2022, 2023, 2024, 2025, 2026 |

Conference tournament champions
- 1997, 2001, 2019, 2022, 2023, 2024

Conference regular-season champions
- 1987, 1988, 1989, 1990, 1992, 1993, 1996, 1998, 2008, 2022

Uniforms
| Home | Away | Alternate |

The Iowa Hawkeyes Women's basketball team represents the University of Iowa in Iowa City, Iowa, United States. The team is a member of the Big Ten Conference as well as the National Collegiate Athletic Association. The team plays its regular season games at 15,400-seat Carver-Hawkeye Arena, along with men's basketball and wrestling teams.

== History ==
=== Origins and Development (1974–1983) ===
The University of Iowa launched its women’s basketball program in 1974, with Lark Birdsong as its first head coach. In the 1974–75 season, the fledgling Hawkeyes compiled a 5–16 overall record, registering their first win against Minnesota. Birdsong coached through the 1978–79 season, guiding the program to its first winning season, although detailed statistical documentation remained limited in the pre‑NCAA era governed by the AIAW. Judy McMullen succeeded Birdsong and led the team for four seasons amid growing institutional support and the rise of Title IX—though wins remained modest, the program’s infrastructure and competitive identity began to form.

=== The C. Vivian Stringer Transformation (1983–1995) ===
When C. Vivian Stringer arrived in 1983, she revolutionized the program. By 1985, Iowa sold out Carver-Hawkeye Arena with 22,157 fans to watch Ohio State—a landmark moment that highlighted both Stringer’s success and growing community support for the women’s game. Over her 12 seasons, Stringer amassed a stellar 269–84 overall record, including a dominant 169–45 Big Ten mark (.790), and achieved ten 20-win seasons and nine NCAA Tournament berths.

Under Stringer, Iowa captured six Big Ten regular-season titles (1987, 1988, 1989, 1990, 1992, 1993) and reached the Elite Eight twice (1987, 1988) before breaking through in 1993 with a 27–4 record. That year, the Hawkeyes advanced past Old Dominion, Auburn, and Tennessee to make the program’s first Final Four, where they narrowly lost 73–72 in overtime to Ohio State. Stringer later earned induction into the Basketball Hall of Fame and became the first coach to lead three different programs to Final Fours.

=== Transition Under Angie Lee (1995–2000) ===
Following Stringer’s departure to Rutgers in 1995, Angie Lee took over on the Iowa sideline. Although her tenure did not match Stringer’s highs, Lee continued the program’s competitive traditions. She led Iowa to a Big Ten championship in her first season, another regular-season title in 1998, and a conference tournament title in 1997. During those years, Iowa remained in NCAA postseason play, setting the stage for the consistency that would follow under the next coach.

=== The Lisa Bluder Era (2000–2024) ===
Lisa Bluder took over the Iowa Hawkeyes in 2000 and became the program’s most enduring figure. Over 24 seasons, she amassed 528 wins, making her Iowa’s all-time winningest coach. Her teams posted winning records in 23 of her 24 seasons, including 22 postseason appearances, 18 NCAA tournaments, and five Big Ten Tournament titles (2001, 2019, 2022, 2023, 2024), along with regular-season titles in 2008 and 2022. Bluder herself earned multiple accolades: Big Ten Coach of the Year in 2001, 2008, and 2010, and Naismith Coach of the Year in 2019.

One of the defining stars in her era was Megan Gustafson, who in the 2018–19 season averaged 27.8 points and 13.4 rebounds on 69.9 percent shooting. Gustafson earned National Player of the Year honors, powered Iowa to a 29–7 record, won the conference tournament, and propelled the team to the Elite Eight, where they lost to eventual national champion Baylor. Her No. 10 jersey was retired by Iowa in 2020.

==== The Caitlin Clark Era (2020–2024) ====
In 2020, Bluder recruited Caitlin Clark, triggering an era of unprecedented success. Across four seasons, Clark redefined the program—and women’s college basketball at large—in both performance and cultural resonance.

2020–21: Clark’s freshman year saw Iowa post a 20–10 overall record and 11–8 in Big Ten play, finishing sixth. The Hawkeyes reached the Big Ten Tournament final but lost to Maryland. They held a No. 5 seed in the NCAA Tournament (Riverwalk Region) and ultimately advanced to the Sweet Sixteen, where they were eliminated by UConn, 92–72. Clark averaged over 20 PPG, became the first D‑I player to record 1,000 points and 300 assists in a season, won USBWA and WBCA Freshman of the Year, and broke arena scoring records.

2021–22: Iowa improved to 24–8 overall and 14–4 in Big Ten, sharing the regular-season title with Ohio State. They won the Big Ten Tournament, where Clark earned MOP honors. Despite earning a No. 2 seed (Greensboro Region) in the NCAA tournament, the team was upset in the second round by #10 seeded Creighton, 64–62. Clark led the nation in both scoring and assists, earned Big Ten Player of the Year, and was a unanimous All-American.

2022–23: The Hawkeyes went 31–7, 15–3 in conference, and claimed their second straight Big Ten Tournament title, with Clark again named MOP. As a No. 2 seed (Seattle Region) in the NCAA tournament, they beat Southeastern Louisiana, Georgia, Colorado, and Louisville to reach Iowa’s first Final Four since 1993. In the National Semifinals, Iowa upset undefeated defending champion South Carolina 77–73, snapping their 42-game win streak; Clark scored 41 points. Iowa fell to LSU 102–85 in the championship game, however. Clark led all tournament scorers with 191 points.

2023–24: The Hawkeyes had their best season: 34–5 overall, 15–3 in conference, earning the program’s first No. 1 seed since 1992 and were overall #2 in the NCAA Tournament. Iowa won a third consecutive Big Ten Tournament title. In the NCAA tournament, they defeated LSU in the Elite Eight 94–87 to reach a 2nd consecutive Final Four; Clark scored 41 points and had 12 assists. In the National Semifinals, the Hawkeyes outlasted UConn 71–69 to reach the championship game for a second straight year; Clark scored 21 points. Despite Clark scoring 30 points, Iowa lost 87–75 to unbeaten South Carolina in a rematch of the previous seasons Final Four. By season’s end, Clark amassed 3,951 career points—making her the all-time leading scorer in NCAA Division I history—men or women—alongside 548 made three-pointers and over 1,140 career assists. Following her impact, Iowa officially retired her No. 22 jersey on February 2, 2025, becoming the third program number to be retired.

Throughout these four seasons, Iowa’s cumulative record stood at 109–30, with Clark eight-time All‑America, three-time Big Ten Player of the Year, three-time Nancy Lieberman and Dawn Staley Award winner, and two-time Naismith and Wooden Player of the Year.

== NCAA tournament results ==
Iowa has appeared in 32 NCAA Tournaments with a record of 39−32.

| Year | Seed | Round | Opponent | Result |
|---|---|---|---|---|
| 1986 | #5 | Second Round | #4 Tennessee | L 68−73 |
| 1987 | #3 | Second Round; Sweet Sixteen; Elite Eight | #6 New Orleans #2 Georgia #1 Louisiana Tech | W 68–56; W 62–60; L 65−66 |
| 1988 | #1 | Second Round; Sweet Sixteen; Elite Eight | #8 Stephen F. Austin #4 Southern Cal #2 Long Beach State | W 83–65; W 79–67; L 78−98 |
| 1989 | #3 | Second Round; Sweet Sixteen | #11 Tennessee Tech #2 Stanford | W 77–75; L 74−98 |
| 1990 | #3 | Second Round | #6 Vanderbilt | L 56−61 |
| 1991 | #6 | First Round; Second Round | #11 Montana #3 Washington | W 64–53; L 53−70 |
| 1992 | #1 | Second Round | #8 SW Missouri State | L 60−61 (OT) |
| 1993 | #2 | Second Round; Sweet Sixteen; Elite Eight; Final Four | #7 Old Dominion #3 Auburn #1 Tennessee #1 Ohio State | W 82–56; W 63–50; W 72−56; L 72–73 (OT) |
| 1994 | #3 | First Round; Second Round | #14 Mount St. Mary's #6 Alabama | W 70–47; L 78−84 |
| 1996 | #2 | First Round; Second Round; Sweet Sixteen | #15 Butler #7 DePaul #3 Vanderbilt | W 72–67; W 72−71; L 63–74 |
| 1997 | #9 | First Round; Second Round | #8 NC State #1 Connecticut | W 56–50; L 53−72 |
| 1998 | #4 | First Round; Second Round | #13 Massachusetts #5 Kansas | W 77–59; L 58−62 |
| 2001 | #4 | First Round; Second Round | #13 Oregon #5 Utah | W 88–82; L 69−78 |
| 2002 | #9 | First Round; Second Round | #8 Virginia #1 Connecticut | W 69–62; L 48−86 |
| 2004 | #9 | First Round | #8 Virginia Tech | L 76−89 |
| 2006 | #10 | First Round | #7 BYU | L 62−67 |
| 2008 | #9 | First Round | #8 Georgia | L 61−67 |
| 2009 | #8 | First Round | #9 Georgia Tech | L 62−76 |
| 2010 | #8 | First Round; Second Round | #9 Rutgers #1 Stanford | W 70–63; L 67−96 |
| 2011 | #6 | First Round | #11 Gonzaga | L 86−92 |
| 2012 | #9 | First Round | #8 California | L 74−84 |
| 2013 | #9 | First Round; Second Round | #8 Miami (FL) #1 Notre Dame | W 69–53; L 57−74 |
| 2014 | #6 | First Round; Second Round | #11 Marist #3 Louisville | W 87–65; L 53−83 |
| 2015 | #3 | First Round; Second Round; Sweet Sixteen | #14 American #11 Miami (FL) #2 Baylor | W 75–67; W 88−70; L 66–81 |
| 2018 | #6 | First Round | #11 Creighton | L 70−76 |
| 2019 | #2 | First Round; Second Round; Sweet Sixteen; Elite Eight | #15 Mercer #7 Missouri #3 NC State #1 Baylor | W 66–61; W 68−52; W 79–61; L 53–85 |
| 2021 | #5 | First Round; Second Round; Sweet Sixteen | #12 Central Michigan #4 Kentucky #1 UConn | W 87–72; W 86−72; L 72–92 |
| 2022 | #2 | First Round; Second Round | #15 Illinois St. #10 Creighton | W 98–58; L 62–64 |
| 2023 | #2 | First Round; Second Round; Sweet Sixteen; Elite Eight; Final Four; Championship | #15 Southeastern Louisiana #10 Georgia #6 Colorado #5 Louisville #1 South Carolina #3 LSU | W 95–43; W 74–66; W 87–77; W 97–83; W 77–73; L 85–102 |
| 2024 | #1 | First Round; Second Round; Sweet Sixteen; Elite Eight; Final Four; Championship | #16 Holy Cross #8 West Virginia #5 Colorado #3 LSU #3 UConn #1 South Carolina | W 91–65; W 64–54; W 89–68; W 94–87; W 71–69; L 75–87 |
| 2025 | #6 | First Round; Second Round | #11 Murray State #3 Oklahoma | W 92–57; L 62–96 |
| 2026 | #2 | First Round; Second Round | #15 Fairleigh Dickinson #10 Virginia | W 58–48; L 75–83 (2OT) |

== Retired numbers ==
The Hawkeyes have retired three jerseys in honor of the women's program, the most recent being Caitlin Clark's in February 2025.

Iowa Hawkeyes retired numbers
| No. | Player | Career | Year | Ref. |
| 10 | Megan Gustafson | 2015–2019 | 2020 | |
| 22 | Caitlin Clark | 2020–2024 | 2025 | |
| 30 | Michelle Edwards | 1985–1988 | 1990 | |

== National award winners ==
AP Female Athlete of the Year

- Caitlin Clark – 2024 (Note: Awarded for Clark's accomplishments and impact in both college basketball and the WNBA.)

James E. Sullivan Award (top college or Olympic athlete in the US)

- Caitlin Clark – 2022, 2023 (Note: The Sullivan Award covers a calendar year, and is presented in the next calendar year.)

Academic All-American of the Year (all Division I sports)

- Caitlin Clark – 2023, 2024

Naismith Trophy

- Megan Gustafson – 2019
- Caitlin Clark – 2023, 2024

Wooden Award

- Caitlin Clark – 2023, 2024

Wade Trophy

- Caitlin Clark – 2023, 2024

AP Player of the Year

- Megan Gustafson – 2019
- Caitlin Clark – 2023, 2024

USBWA Player of the Year

- Megan Gustafson – 2019
- Caitlin Clark – 2023, 2024

Naismith Coach of the Year

- Lisa Bluder – 2019

Maggie Dixon Award (top first-year Division I head coach)

- Jan Jensen – 2025

Academic All-American of the Year (D-I women's basketball)

- Ally Disterhoft – 2016, 2017
- Caitlin Clark – 2023, 2024

Lisa Leslie Award (top D-I center)

- Megan Gustafson – 2019

Nancy Lieberman Award (top D-I point guard)

- Caitlin Clark – 2022, 2023, 2024

Dawn Staley Award (top D-I point guard)

- Caitlin Clark – 2021, 2022, 2023

Tamika Catchings Award (USBWA freshman of the year)

- Caitlin Clark – 2021 (shared with Paige Bueckers of UConn)

WBCA Freshman of the Year

- Caitlin Clark – 2021 (shared with Bueckers)

== See also ==
- Iowa Hawkeyes women's basketball statistical leaders
- The Law Firm — collective nickname for Caitlin Clark and Monika Czinano, the key players in Iowa's early-2020s success
- Caitlin Clark
- Caitlin Clark effect – Clark's influence on the popularity of women's basketball, both at Iowa and in the WNBA
