= Jan Jensen (basketball) =

American basketball coach and former player (born 1968)

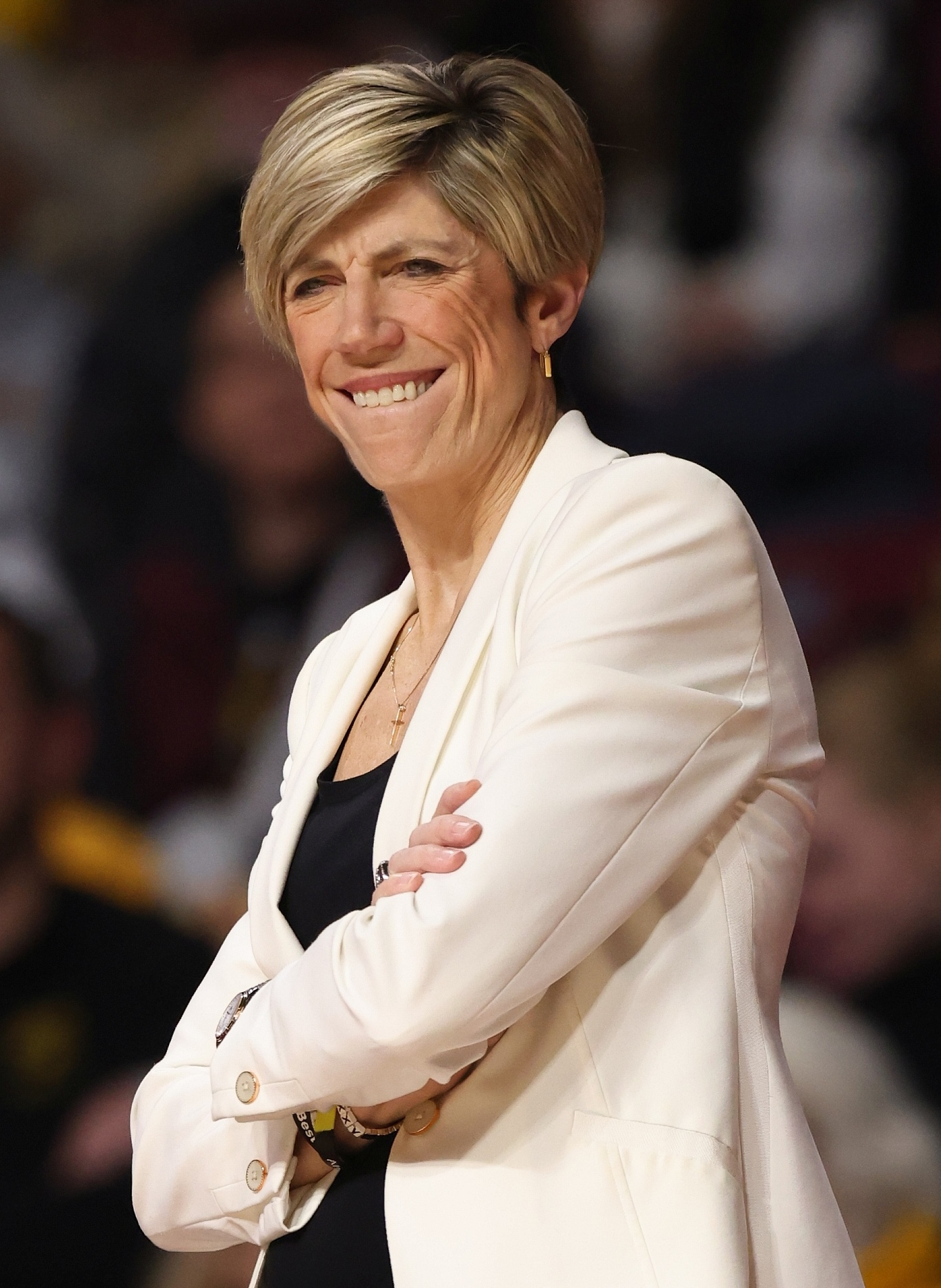
- Jensen with Iowa in 2025

Current position
- Title: Head coach
- Team: Iowa
- Conference: Big 10
- Record: 50–18 (.735)

Biographical details
- Born: December 6, 1968 (age 57); Kimballton, Iowa, U.S.

Playing career
- 1987–1991: Drake
- Position: Point guard

Coaching career (HC unless noted)
- 1993–2000: Drake (assistant)
- 2000–2024: Iowa (Associate HC)
- 2024–present: Iowa

Head coaching record
- Overall: 50–18 (.735)

Accomplishments and honors

Championships
- As assistant coach: 2× NCAA Regional — Final Four (2023, 2024); 5× Big Ten tournament champion (2001, 2019, 2022–2024); 2× Big Ten regular season champion (2008, 2022); 4× MVC tournament champion (1995, 1997, 1998, 2000); 3× MVC regular season champion (1997, 1998, 2000)

Awards
- As player: Women's Basketball Academic All-American of the Year (1991); Gateway Conference MVP (1991); All-Gateway (1991); MVC Player of the Year (1991); 2x First-team All-MVC (1990, 1991); NCAA season scoring leader (1991); GTE Academic All-American Player of the Year (1991); MVC All-Centennial team (2007); No. 13 retired by Drake Bulldogs; As coach: WBCA Assistant Coach of the Year – Division I (2023); Maggie Dixon Award (2025)

Jan Jensen (born December 6, 1968) is an American college basketball coach and former basketball player. Jensen currently serves as the head coach for the Iowa Hawkeyes women's team. She spent her playing career at Drake, where she led women's NCAA Division I in scoring for 1990–91.

Following her playing career, she became an assistant at Drake for her former head coach Lisa Bluder. Jensen followed Bluder to Iowa, joining her coaching staff there and succeeded Bluder as Iowa's head coach in 2024.

== Early life ==
Jensen was born on December 6, 1968 in the small rural town of Kimballton, Iowa. Basketball played a large part in Jensen's family background. Her grandmother, Dorcas Andersen, was part of a team that won the Iowa state basketball tournament in 1921. The team played a brand of 6-on-6 basketball that saw popularity in rural Iowa – a popularity uncommon for women's sports during this time period. The local newspaper dubbed Andersen "Lottie" in reference to her scoring "a lot of points."

Jensen played high school basketball at Elk Horn–Kimballton High School. As a senior, she led the country with 66 points per game (ppg) in 1987. For her high school career, she was inducted into the Iowa Girls High School Basketball Hall of Fame in 1993. She also ran track and played volleyball and softball in high school.

== Playing career ==
=== College ===
Jensen accepted a scholarship to play basketball for the Drake Bulldogs. In Jensen's senior season, Lisa Bluder became the head coach for Drake. Jensen was initially skeptical of Bluder's hiring, stating "It's kind of, are you kidding me, right? New coach. I'm a senior. And then it ended up being really the best thing. She was just tremendous. She was really just a player's coach and intense but knew how to make it fun. Obviously, it benefited me." Jensen led Division I women's basketball in scoring that season, finishing with 29.6 ppg. For the season, she was also named a Kodak Honorable Mention All-American, a member of the All-Gateway team, and the GTE Academic All-American Player of the Year.

In 2007, the Missouri Valley Conference (MVC) named Jensen as one of the 35 greatest players in conference history, listing her on the MVC women's basketball All-Centennial Team as part of the conference's 100th anniversary.

=== College statistics ===
Legend
GP	Games played	GS	Games started	MPG	Minutes per game
FG%	Field goal percentage	3P%	3-point field goal percentage	FT%	Free throw percentage
RPG	Rebounds per game	APG	Assists per game	SPG	Steals per game
BPG	Blocks per game	PPG	Points per game	**Bold**

*	Led Division I

Year	Team	GP	GS	MPG	FG%	3P%	FT%	RPG	APG	SPG	BPG	TO	PPG
1987–88	Drake	25	–	–	.417	.250	.708	3.7	.7	.4	.1	–	5.8
1988–89	Drake	27	–	–	.534	.333	.672	7.3	1.9	1.4	.1	–	16.2
1989–90	Drake	26	–	–	.524	.091	.741	7.9	1.5	1.5	.1	–	20.2
1990–91	Drake	**30**	–	–	**.572**	**.353**	**.826**	**8.6**	**2.0**	**1.5**	.1	–	**29.6***
**Career**		108	–	–	.535	.237	.772	6.9	1.5	1.2	.1	–	18.5
Statistics retrieved from Sports-Reference.

=== Professional ===
Following her Drake career, Jensen played professional basketball in Europe. Playing for BTV 1846 Wuppertal in Germany in the 1992–93 season, she helped the club win the German Women's Basketball Cup.

== Coaching career ==
=== Drake ===
After her season in Germany, Jensen returned to Drake as a graduate assistant. Jensen joined Bluder's coaching staff following her playing career. Under Bluder and Jensen, Drake reached the Missouri Valley Conference tournament eight times and had five seasons with 20 or more wins. Jensen served as Bluder's first assistant coach and recruiting coordinator at Drake. Bluder and Jensen also worked with Jenni Fitzgerald, who served as a special assistant to Bluder.

=== Iowa ===
When Bluder was offered the head coaching position for Iowa's women's basketball program in 2000, she asked Jensen and Fitzgerald to accompany her at Iowa. Although hesitant because Drake offered her the open head coaching position, Jensen ultimately decided to join Bluder's coaching staff at Iowa.

In 2004, she began serving as Iowa's associate head coach. In this role, Jensen functioned as Iowa's recruiting coordinator and additionally worked with the team's post players. Jensen played a key role in recruiting Megan Gustafson and Caitlin Clark to Iowa. Both players were named All-Americans and would impact the Hawkeyes greatly. Under her tutelage at Iowa, nine post players have been named All-Big Ten players, including Gustafson and Monika Czinano, who also was named an All-American.

The Hawkeyes won the Big Ten Tournament in 2022. In March 2023, Jensen received the Women's Basketball Coaches Association (WBCA) Assistant Coach of the Year award for Division I coaches. The Hawkeyes advanced to the national championship game in the 2023 NCAA Division I women's basketball tournament, but lost to LSU. The following season, the Hawkeyes once again had a successful season, winning the 2024 Big Ten women's basketball tournament and finishing as runners-up in the 2024 March Madness tournament. They lost that year's national championship game to South Carolina.

Bluder announced her retirement on May 13, 2024, with Jensen being announced as her successor. Jensen was formally introduced at a press conference on campus on May 15, with Bluder in attendance. It was announced that the remainder of the staff would remain intact. In her first season as head coach, Jensen led the Hawkeyes to a 23–11 record overall, going 10–8 in conference play. Jensen won the Maggie Dixon Award for her first-year coaching efforts.

== Head coaching record ==
Record table
Season	Team	Overall	Conference	Standing	Postseason
Iowa Hawkeyes (Big Ten Conference) (2024–present)
2024–25	Iowa	23–11	10–8	T–8th	NCAA Second Round
2025–26	Iowa	27–7	15–3	T–2nd	NCAA Second Round
Iowa:		50–18 (.735)	25–11 (.694)		
Total:		50–18 (.735)			
National champion Postseason invitational champion Conference regular season champion Conference regular season and conference tournament champion Division regular season champion Division regular season and conference tournament champion Conference tournament champion

== Personal life ==
Jensen graduated from Drake in 1991 with a degree in public relations and earned a master's degree in higher education in 1996.

Jensen is openly gay, though at one point she considered leaving the Drake program in the 1990s out of fear that coming out would hurt the program. Since coming out, Jensen has stated "I've just never felt different here or hampered here [at Iowa]". She is married to Julie Fitzpatrick who is a physical therapist and also a maternal aunt to former University of Iowa basketball player, Kate Martin In 2020, she received the LGBTQ Legacy Leader Award from dsm Magazine and the One Iowa Leadership Institute. Together, Jensen and Fitzpatrick have two children.

In her local community, Jensen is a leader of the United Way of Johnson County and is also involved with Shelter House, an organization that helps people move past homelessness. For her community volunteering efforts, Drake awarded her the "Double D" award, presented to Drake letterwinners for achievements following their graduation from Drake.

Jensen's mother and father died during Iowa's national tournament runs in 2015 and 2023, respectively. Her brother died of a heart attack in February 2020.

== See also ==
- List of NCAA Division I women's basketball season scoring leaders
