= Lindsay Gottlieb =

American basketball coach (born 1977)

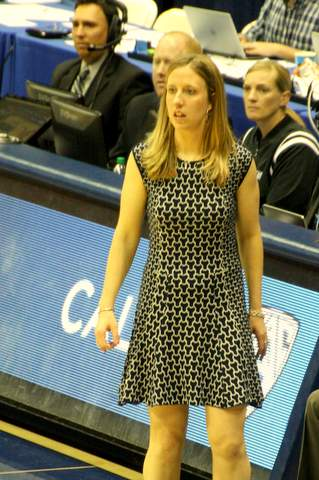
- Gottlieb with the California Golden Bears in 2015

USC Trojans
- Position: Head coach
- League: Big Ten Conference

Personal information
- Born: October 2, 1977 (age 49) Scarsdale, New York, U.S.

Career information
- High school: Scarsdale (Scarsdale, New York)
- College: Brown (1995–1999)
- Coaching career: 1999–present

Career history

Coaching
- 1999–2001: Syracuse (assistant)
- 2001–2002: New Hampshire (assistant)
- 2002–2005: Richmond (assistant)
- 2005–2007: California (assistant)
- 2007–2008: California (assoc. HC)
- 2008–2011: UC Santa Barbara
- 2011–2019: California
- 2019–2021: Cleveland Cavaliers (assistant)
- 2021–present: USC

Career highlights
- As coach: NCAA Regional championship – Final Four (2013); Pac-12 Conference tournament championships (2024); Pac-12 regular season championship (2013); Big Ten regular season championship (2025); Big Ten Coach of the Year (2025); Pac-12 Coach of the Year – Media (2013); 2× Big West championship (2009, 2011); Big West Coach of the Year (2009)

Lindsay Catherine Gottlieb (born October 2, 1977) is an American basketball coach who is the women's head coach for the USC Trojans of the Big Ten Conference. She was previously the head coach of the California Golden Bears women's team before becoming an assistant coach for the Cleveland Cavaliers of the National Basketball Association (NBA).

Gottlieb played college basketball for the Brown Bears. She began her head coaching career with the UC Santa Barbara Gauchos where she spent three years and led the team to two regular-season Big West championships in 2009 and 2011, as well as the Big West tournament championship in 2009. In just her second season with the California Golden Bears in 2012–13, Gottlieb led the team to their first Final Four in school history, their first Pac-12 Conference championship, and the most wins ever by a Cal women's basketball team (32–4). Gottlieb was named Pac-12 Coach of the Year by the media, and was one of the four finalists for the Naismith National Coach of the Year. In her first season at Cal, Gottlieb's Bears had a 25–10 record, making her the first women's basketball coach to win 20 games in her first season at California. That year, Gottlieb led the Bears to the second round of the NCAA women's basketball tournament. She earned her 100th career victory on February 3, 2013.

== Early life ==
Gottlieb was born in Scarsdale, New York, and is Jewish. Most of her family members are lawyers, and her father was a New York state judge. Gottlieb was passionate about sports from an early age. "Whatever sports season it was, I wanted to play," says Gottlieb. "I pretty much just wanted to be playing ball all the time." She started playing organized basketball in the fourth grade and by the time she reached high school was hoping for a college basketball career. Spending her senior year at Scarsdale High School on the bench with a torn ACL led her to view the game from a different perspective, and to consider coaching.

== College ==
Gottlieb followed in the tradition of both her parents and attended an Ivy League college, in her case Brown University. She played basketball her freshman year as a guard for the Brown Bears, but after her mother died during her sophomore year, she decided to spend a year studying abroad in Australia. It was during that year abroad that she decided to pursue a coaching career seriously. Gottlieb explained, "I knew that it was the perfect thing for me because it combined kind of my nerdiness and love of the X's and O's with the ability to impact 18- to 22-year-olds in a really significant way. To be able to do what I love, basketball, and have this intense impact on people, I felt that was it."

When Gottlieb returned to Brown for her senior year in 1998–99, she was both a player and a student assistant, working with the coaching staff. Her teammates voted her the Team Heart and Soul Award in 1999. That same year, she was also awarded her B.A. in political science.

== Coaching career ==
=== Assistant coach ===
Because of her experience as a player-coach at Brown, Gottlieb was hired as an assistant by Syracuse University head coach Marianna Freeman, the day after she graduated from college. In the two years she spent at Syracuse, Gottlieb also earned a master's degree in the philosophy of education. Then in 2001, she moved to the University of New Hampshire, where she was an assistant under Sue Johnson. The following year, the 24-year-old Gottlieb was asked by the head coach of the University of Richmond, Joanne Boyle, to be her top assistant. According to Gottlieb, it took her "about 30 seconds" to accept.

Gottlieb worked under Boyle for three successful seasons at Richmond, 2002–05. The Spiders had three consecutive seasons with 20 or more wins. In 2003 and 2004 Richmond played in the WNIT, and in 2005 the Spiders received their first invitation to the NCAA Tournament in 14 years.

In 2005, Boyle was hired as the head coach of the University of California, and she brought Gottlieb with her to Berkeley as her top assistant. At California, Gottlieb was involved in recruiting and scouting, and was the team's academic liaison. But she was primarily responsible for working with and developing the Bears' outstanding freshman post players, Ashley Walker and Devanei Hampton. Both became All-Americans, and Hampton was the first California player to be named Pac-10 Player of the Year (2006–07), while Walker went on to become the first Golden Bear to be drafted by the WNBA, a first-round pick of the Seattle Storm.

During Boyle and Gottlieb's first year at California, 2005–06, the Bears had their first winning season in 13 years and received their first NCAA Tournament bid since 1993. The Bears made the NCAA Tournament each of three years that Gottlieb was an assistant in Berkeley. In 2007, Gottlieb was elevated to Associate Head Coach.

=== UC Santa Barbara ===
On May 15, 2008, Gottlieb was named head coach of the University of California, Santa Barbara. The 30-year-old Gottlieb was just the fourth head coach in UCSB history, and replaced retiring long-time coach, Mark French. In her first season as a head coach, Gottlieb led the Gauchos to a 15–1 regular season conference record in the Big West Conference, and a 22–10 record overall. She was the first coach at UCSB to win 20 games in her first season. Gottlieb scheduled a demanding non-conference season, and the Gauchos pulled off a convincing 59–47 upset of Gonzaga. UCSB won both the regular season Big West championship and the conference tournament championship for 2008–09, which secured an invitation to the NCAA tournament. The 15-seed Gauchos were knocked off by the 2 seed, Stanford, in the first round. Gottlieb was named Big West Coach of the Year for 2008–09.

During Gottlieb's second season at UCSB, the Gauchos compiled a disappointing 15–17 record. But the following season, 2010–11, the team bounced back with a 19–12 record. They won the Big West regular season championship with a 12–4 conference record. The Gauchos received an invitation to the WNIT, where they lost a close game on the road to USC in the opening round, 67–64.

=== California ===
In April 2011, Gottlieb's mentor, Joanne Boyle, left the University of California for the head coach job at the University of Virginia. On April 25, 2011, Gottlieb returned to Berkeley as the ninth head coach of the Golden Bears. Gottlieb inherited a very talented, but young team, which had ended the 2010–11 season losing seven of their last eight games.

Gottlieb's first team at California had no seniors, and started freshmen at point guard and forward. The Bears played a schedule filled with ranked teams, and they suffered tough losses by three points or less to #12 Ohio State, #16 Rutgers, and #24 Texas. They also took #4 Stanford to overtime on the road, before falling 74–71. They did pull off a 59–50 upset of #22 Virginia and their former coach Joanne Boyle. But Gottlieb's team came back after every tough loss to win. Their play was marked by dominance in rebounding, particularly on the offensive boards. The Bears ended the 2011–12 season with a record of 25–10. Their 13–5 record in conference play put them in second place in the Pac-12 Conference. California was invited the NCAA Tournament for the first time since 2009, as an 8 seed. In the first round the Bears beat 9-seed Iowa, 84–74. In the second round they faced 1 seed Notre Dame on the Irish home floor. The Bears played Notre Dame to a 31–31 tie at the half, but the Irish pulled away in the second half, winning 73–62.

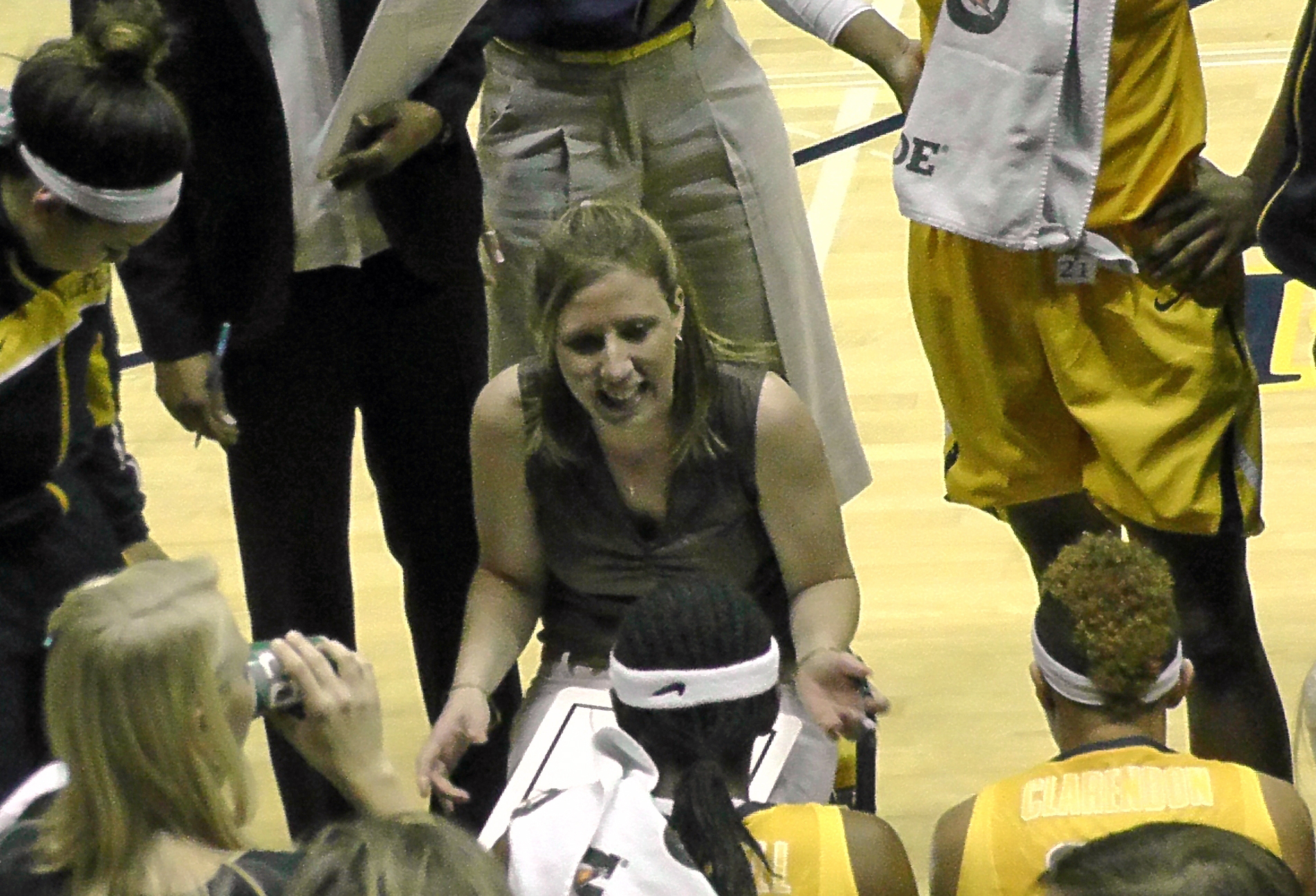
Gottlieb in 2013

With almost the entire team returning for the 2012–13 season, expectations were high, and the Bears were ranked #13 in the AP pre-season poll, their highest ranking since 2009. The Bears more than lived up to the expectations, compiling a 32–4 season record, and ending the regular season with a #6 ranking. The highlight of the regular season was a 67–55 road victory over arch-rival and perennial women's basketball power #4 ranked Stanford. Cal's victory broke an 81-game conference winning streak for the Cardinal. Gottlieb led the Bears to a 17–1 conference record, making them Pac-12 Conference co-champions—the first conference championship in California Women's Basketball history. The Bears earned a second seed in the NCAA tournament, the Bears' highest tournament seed ever. They defeated Fresno State 90–76 in the first round, and downed South Florida in overtime to advance to the Sweet Sixteen for only the second time in school history. The Bears beat LSU to advance to the Elite Eight for the first time, and then earned their first trip to the Final Four trip with a thrilling 65–62 overtime victory over Andy Landers' Georgia Bulldogs at the Spokane Arena in Spokane, WA. A tough loss to Louisville in the national semifinal game concluded the team's extraordinary season. "What I said to our team in the locker room is that we can be disappointed about a half a basketball that we wish we had back. We could be disappointed to not be playing on Tuesday night," Gottlieb said. "But I'm going to think about that for two minutes, and for the next 10,000 minutes I'm going to think about what this group did for the University of California."

In addition to their outstanding success on the court, Gottlieb's 2012–13 California team became nationally known as a team that had fun, while also keeping focus. Senior leader Layshia Clarendon cut her hair into what became a trademark mohawk, and the team wrote, produced, and starred in their own music video, "Started from the Bottom." Coach Gottlieb explained: "My philosophy in general is that college athletics should be an enjoyable experience for the people involved in it. I think you have to embrace this team's nature of being fun-loving. You have to empower them to enjoy the experience. I can do that because I'm so confident in their focus. They're creative, and they're smart kids. If anything, I think that when they're happier and enjoying it, they're more likely to play hard and play well."

Gottlieb's tenure at California has also been notable for her embrace of the internet and social media as tools for reaching out to athletes, fans, and the media. Gottlieb and her coaching staff are very active on Twitter. And Gottlieb has established a Cal Women's Basketball website designed to appeal to young athletes and fans. She has set an unequivocal goal of making the University of California Women's Basketball team one of the elite programs in the country.

Gottlieb coached at Cal through 2018–19, a year in which she led the Golden Bears to their seventh NCAA tournament appearance under her tenure. The team, led on the court by Oakland native Asha Thomas and 2019 WNBA draft first-round selection Kristine Anigwe, was eliminated in the second round by the Baylor Lady Bears, who went on to win the championship. In eight seasons as the head coach of the Golden Bears, Gottlieb compiled a 179–89 overall record, with her teams going 88–59 in Pac-12 play.

=== Cleveland Cavaliers ===
On June 12, 2019, the Cleveland Cavaliers hired Gottlieb to a four-year contract as an assistant coach, becoming part of new head coach John Beilein's staff. Gottlieb became the first NCAA women's head coach to be hired by an NBA team.

=== USC ===
Gottlieb was named the women's head coach at the University of Southern California on May 10, 2021.

== Head coaching record ==
Sources: UCSB, Big West Conference, California Pac-12

Record table
Season	Team	Overall	Conference	Standing	Postseason
UC Santa Barbara Gauchos (Big West Conference) (2008–2011)
2008–09	UC Santa Barbara	22–10	15–1	1st	NCAA First Round
2009–10	UC Santa Barbara	15–17	9–7	5th	
2010–11	UC Santa Barbara	19–12	12–4	1st	WNIT First Round
UCSB:		56–39 (.589)	36–12 (.750)		
California Golden Bears (Pac-12 Conference) (2011–2019)
2011–12	California	25–10	13–5	2nd	NCAA Second Round
2012–13	California	32–4	17–1	T–1st	NCAA Final Four
2013–14	California	22–10	13–5	T–2nd	NCAA Second Round
2014–15	California	24–10	13–5	T–3rd	NCAA Second Round
2015–16	California	15–17	4–14	10th	
2016–17	California	20–14	6–12	T–7th	NCAA Second Round
2017–18	California	21–11	11–7	5th	NCAA First Round
2018–19	California	20–13	9–9	T–6th	NCAA Second Round
California:		179–89 (.668)	86–58 (.597)		
USC Trojans (Pac-12 Conference) (2021–2024)
2021–22	USC	12–16	5–12	10th	
2022–23	USC	21–10	11–7	T–4th	NCAA First Round
2023–24	USC	29–6	13–5	T–2nd	NCAA Elite Eight
USC Trojans (Big Ten Conference) (2024–present)
2024-25	USC	31–4	17–1	1st	NCAA Elite Eight
2025-26	USC	18–14	9–9	T-9th	NCAA Second Round
USC:		111–49 (.694)	55–34 (.618)		
Total:		343–178 (.658)			
National champion Postseason invitational champion Conference regular season champion Conference regular season and conference tournament champion Division regular season champion Division regular season and conference tournament champion Conference tournament champion

== Awards and honors ==
- 2009 - Big West Coach of the Year
- 2013 - Pac12 Media Coach of the Year
- 2013 - Finalist Naismith Women's Coach of the Year award
- 2016 - inducted into Jewish Sports Hall of Fame Northern California
- 2024 - Pac12 Tournament Champion

== Personal life ==
Gottlieb's husband is a finance entrepreneur. They have two children, a son and a daughter, Jordan (b. 2017) and Reese (b. 2022).

== See also ==
- List of female NBA coaches
