= Cal Basketball =

Cal Basketball may refer to:

- California Golden Bears men's basketball, the men's basketball team of the University of California, Berkeley
- California Golden Bears women's basketball, the women's basketball team the University of California, Berkeley
