= Marvadene Anderson =

Jamaican basketball and netball player (born 1993)

Personal information
- Nickname: Bubbles
- Nationality: Jamaican
- Born: 1 May 1993 (age 31)
- Height: 2.12 m (6 ft 11 1/2 in)
- Weight: 107 kg (236 lb)

Sport
- Country: Jamaica
- Sport: Basketball, Netball

Marvadene (Bubbles) Anderson (born 1 May 1993) is a Jamaican basketball and netball player, at one time recognized as the world's tallest teenage girl at 6 ft 11.5 in (2.12 m). Anderson is originally from Prospect in Clarendon Parish, where she attended Edwin Allen Comprehensive High School. She also played in the Jamaican U16 netball team. Anderson subsequently travelled to the United States on a basketball scholarship to Rutgers Preparatory School in New Jersey.

As the world's tallest teenage girl, Anderson was featured on The Learning Channel documentary The World's Tallest Children, and in 2010 she was interviewed on The Oprah Winfrey Show. Anderson committed to play basketball at the University of Pittsburgh, and redshirted during the 2012-13 season.
