= 2012–13 California Golden Bears women's basketball team =

Intercollegiate basketball season

2012–13 California Golden Bears women's basketball

Pac-12 Regular season champions

NCAA Women's Tournament, Final Four
- Conference: Pac-12 Conference

Ranking
- Coaches: No. 4
- AP: No. 6
- Record: 32–4 (17–1 Pac-12)
- Head coach: Lindsay Gottlieb (2nd season)
- Assistant coaches: Charmin Smith; Kai Felton; Katy Steding
- Home arena: Haas Pavilion

2012–13 Pac-12 Conference women's basketball standings
	Conf.				Overall
Team	W		L	PCT	W		L	PCT
No. 4 Stanford †	17	–	1	.944	33	–	3	.917
No. 6 California	17	–	1	.944	32	–	4	.889
No. 11 UCLA	14	–	4	.778	26	–	8	.765
No. 19 Colorado	13	–	5	.722	25	–	7	.781
Washington	11	–	7	.611	21	–	12	.636
Utah	8	–	10	.444	23	–	14	.622
USC	7	–	11	.389	11	–	20	.355
Washington State	6	–	12	.333	11	–	20	.355
Arizona State	5	–	13	.278	13	–	18	.419
Arizona	4	–	14	.222	12	–	18	.400
Oregon State	4	–	14	.222	10	–	21	.323
Oregon	2	–	16	.111	4	–	27	.129
† 2013 Pac-12 Tournament winner Rankings from AP poll

The 2012–13 California Golden Bears women's basketball team will represent University of California, Berkeley during the 2012–13 NCAA Division I women's basketball season. The Golden Bears, led by second-year head coach Lindsay Gottlieb, played their home games at the Haas Pavilion and were members of the Pac-12 Conference. They finished with a record of 32–4 overall, 17–1 in Pac-12 play to tie for the conference regular season title with Stanford. They lost in the semifinals of the 2013 Pac-12 Conference women's basketball tournament to UCLA. They were invited to the 2013 NCAA Division I women's basketball tournament where they reached the first Final Four in program history.

== Roster ==
2012–13 California Golden Bears women's basketball team
Players
Coaches

Pos.	#	Name	Height	Year	Previous school	Hometown
G	1	Tierra Rogers	5 ft 11 in (1.8 m)	RS Sr	Sacred Heart Cathedral Prep	San Francisco, Calif.
G	2	Afure Jemerigbe	6 ft 0 in (1.83 m)	Jr	St. Mary's	Stockton, Calif.
G	4	Eliza Pierre	5 ft 7 in (1.7 m)	Sr	John Muir	Pasadena, Calif.
G	5	Avigiel Cohen	6 ft 0 in (1.83 m)	Jr	Rothberg	Ramat HaSharon, Israel
G	15	Brittany Boyd	5 ft 9 in (1.75 m)	So	Berkeley	Berkeley, Calif.
F	21	Reshanda Gray	6 ft 3 in (1.91 m)	So	Washington Prep	Los Angeles, Calif.
G	23	Layshia Clarendon	5 ft 9 in (1.75 m)	Sr	Cajon	San Bernardino, Calif.
F	25	Gennifer Brandon	6 ft 2 in (1.88 m)	RS Jr	Chatsworth	Sylmar, Calif.
G	30	Mikayla Lyles	5 ft 8 in (1.73 m)	Jr	Bishop O'Dowd	Pleasanton, Calif.
C	33	Talia Caldwell	6 ft 3 in (1.91 m)	Sr	Marlborough	Los Angeles, Calif.
F	40	Justine Hartman	6 ft 2 in (1.88 m)	So	Brea Olinda	Whittier, Calif.
G		Brittany Shine (redshirt)	5 ft 10 in (1.78 m)		Sacramento High School	Sacramento, Calif.
F		Kyra Dunn (redshirt)	6 ft 3 in (1.91 m)		Sacramento High School	Sacramento, Calif.

Head coach

Lindsay Gottlieb

Assistant coach(es)

Charmin Smith
Kai Felton
Katy Steding

Legend

- (C) Team captain
- (S) Suspended
- (I) Ineligible
- (W) Walk-on
- Injured
- Current redshirt

Roster

== Schedule ==
Date time, TV	Rank^{#}	Opponent^{#}	Result	Record	Site (attendance) city, state
Exhibition
Nov 1, 2012*	No. 9	Vanguard			Haas Pavilion; Berkeley, CA
Regular Season
Nov 9, 2012*	No. 13	Lehigh	W 80–48	1–0	Haas Pavilion; Berkeley, CA
Nov 15, 2012*	No. 12	Saint Mary's	W 89–41	2–0	Haas Pavilion; Berkeley, CA
Nov 19, 2012*	No. 11	Cal Poly	W 87–61	3–0	Haas Pavilion; Berkeley, CA
Nov 23, 2012*	No. 11	Eastern Washington	W 91–58	4–0	Haas Pavilion; Berkeley, CA
Nov 24, 2012*	No. 11	Georgetown	W 72–56	5–0	Haas Pavilion; Berkeley, CA
Nov 30, 2012*	No. 10	at Old Dominion	W 63–47	6–0	ODU Fieldhouse; Norfolk, VA
Dec 2, 2012*	No. 10	at No. 4 Duke	L 63–77	6–1	Cameron Indoor Stadium; Durham, NC
Dec 7, 2012*	No. 11	at Cal State Bakersfield	W 84–46	7–1	Icardo Center; Bakersfield, CA
Dec 17, 2012*	No. 8	at Northwestern	W 71–65	8–1	Welsh–Ryan Arena; Evanston, IL
Dec 21, 2012*	No. 8	No. 19 Kansas	W 88–79	9–1	Haas Pavilion; Berkeley, CA
Dec 28, 2012*	No. 8	George Washington	W 70–43	10–1	Haas Pavilion; Berkeley, CA
Jan 4, 2013	No. 7	at Utah	W 55–50	11–1 (1–0)	Jon M. Huntsman Center; Salt Lake City, Utah
Jan 6, 2013	No. 7	at No. 20 Colorado	W 53–49	12–1 (2–0)	Coors Events Center; Boulder, Colorado
Jan 8, 2013	No. 7	No. 5 Stanford	L 53–62	12–2 (2–1)	Haas Pavilion; Berkeley, CA
Jan 13, 2013	No. 7	at No. 5 Stanford	W 67–55	13–2 (3–1)	Maples Pavilion; Stanford, CA
Jan 17, 2013	No. 7	USC	W 71–63 ^{OT}	14–2 (4–1)	Haas Pavilion; Berkeley, CA
Jan 20, 2013	No. 7	No. 14 UCLA	W 70–65	15–2 (5–1)	Haas Pavilion; Berkeley, CA
Mar 2, 2013	No. 5	at Washington	W 78–50	27–2 (17–1)	Alaska Airlines Arena; Seattle, WA
Pac-12 Conference tournament
Mar 8, 2013*	No. 5	USC; Quarterfinals	W 78–59	28–2	KeyArena; Seattle, WA
Mar 9, 2013*	No. 5	No. 14 UCLA; Semifinals	L 58–70	28–3	KeyArena; Seattle, WA
NCAA tournament
Mar 23, 2013*	(2 SPK) No. 6	vs. (15 SPK) Fresno State; First round	W 90–76	29–3	United Spirit Arena; Lubbock, TX
Mar 25, 2013*	(2 SPK) No. 6	vs. (10 SPK) South Florida; Second round	W 82–78 ^{OT}	30–3	United Spirit Arena; Lubbock, TX
Mar 30, 2013*	(2 SPK) No. 6	vs. (6 SPK) LSU; Regional Semifinal – Sweet Sixteen	W 73–63	31–3	Spokane Veterans Memorial Arena; Spokane, WA
Apr 1, 2013*	(2 SPK) No. 6	vs. (4 SPK) No. 14 Georgia; Regional Final – Elite Eight	W 65–62 ^{OT}	32–3	Spokane Veterans Memorial Arena; Spokane, WA
Apr 7, 2013*	(2 SPK) No. 6	vs. (5 OKC) No. 16 Louisville; National Semifinal – Final Four	L 57–64	32–4	Smoothie King Center; New Orleans, LA
*Non-conference game. ^{#}Rankings from AP Poll. (#) Tournament seedings in parentheses. SPK=Spokane. All times are in Pacific Time.

== See also ==
- 2012–13 California Golden Bears men's basketball team
