= 2012–13 Connecticut Huskies women's basketball team =

Intercollegiate basketball season

2012–13 Connecticut Huskies women's basketball

NCAA tournament National Champions Paradise Jam champions
- Conference: Big East

Ranking
- Coaches: No. 1
- AP: No. 3
- Record: 35–4 (14–2 Big East)
- Head coach: Geno Auriemma (28th season)
- Assistant coaches: Chris Dailey; Shea Ralph; Marisa Moseley
- Home arena: Harry A. Gampel Pavilion

2012–13 Big East Conference women's basketball standings
	Conf.				Overall
Team	W		L	PCT	W		L	PCT
No. 2 Notre Dame†	16	–	0	1.000	35	–	2	.946
No. 3 Connecticut	14	–	2	.875	35	–	4	.897
No. 16 Louisville	11	–	5	.688	29	–	9	.763
St. John's	11	–	5	.688	18	–	13	.581
South Florida	9	–	7	.563	22	–	11	.667
Villanova	9	–	7	.563	21	–	11	.656
DePaul	9	–	7	.563	21	–	12	.636
Rutgers	7	–	9	.438	16	–	14	.533
Marquette	7	–	9	.438	16	–	16	.500
Georgetown	5	–	11	.313	15	–	16	.484
Seton Hall	5	–	11	.313	11	–	20	.355
Cincinnati	4	–	12	.250	12	–	18	.400
Providence	2	–	14	.125	7	–	23	.233
Pittsburgh	0	–	16	.000	9	–	21	.300
† 2013 Big East Basketball Tournament winner As of April 9, 2013; Rankings from AP poll

The 2012–13 Connecticut Huskies women's basketball team represented the University of Connecticut in the 2012–13 NCAA Division I basketball season. The Huskies, coached by Geno Auriemma, played their home games at two different venues—the XL Center in Hartford, Connecticut, and on campus at the Harry A. Gampel Pavilion in Storrs, Connecticut. Connecticut was a member of the Big East Conference in the league's final season before its split along football lines into the football-sponsoring American Athletic Conference (The American) and the new, non-football Big East. Connecticut, as an FBS football school, became a member of The American, which retained the charter of the original Big East.

The Huskies won their 30th game of the season on March 23, 2013, representing the eighth consecutive year the team has won thirty or more games. This consecutive streak of eight seasons is the longest in NCAA history for basketball.

Connecticut's season ended with a win in the championship game of the NCAA tournament, giving the Huskies and Auriemma their eighth title overall. Per tradition, the team was invited to the White House for a meeting with the President. In his remarks, President Obama described the team as "one of the great sports dynasties of our time."

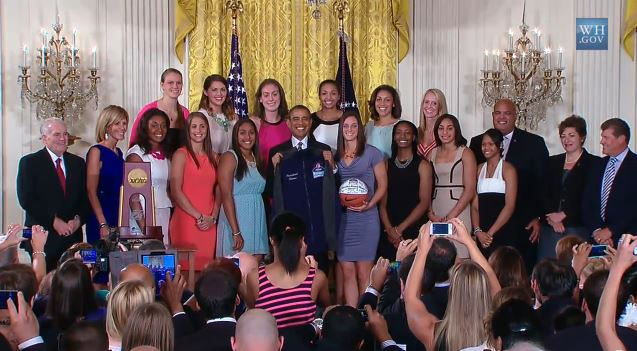
The UConn Women's Basketball team is greeted by President Obama at the White House

== Off-season ==
=== USA Basketball ===
Connecticut basketball players, current, past and incoming, were active in USA basketball events during 2012.

==== Olympics ====
The premier event was the Olympics where the 12-member Olympic squad included six former Huskies:

- Sue Bird
- Swin Cash
- Tina Charles
- Asjha Jones
- Maya Moore
- Diana Taurasi

The USA team made it easily to the medal rounds, but was challenged in the semi-finals, when Australia started out strong and held a four-point lead at halftime. The USA team emphasized defense in the second half, and held on to win 86–76. In the next game, Team USA asserted itself earlier, and won the gold medal 86–50 over France.

==== USA U18 ====
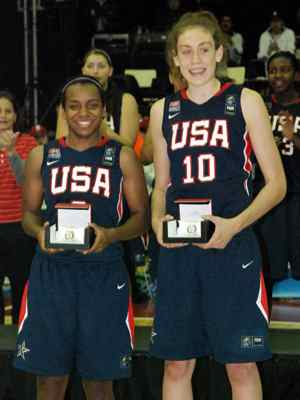
Ariel Massengale and Breanna Stewart, two of the five member named to the five-member All-FIBA U19 World Championship team

Three incoming freshmen were on the ten-player team representing the US in the 2012 FIBA Americas U18 Championship:

- Breanna Stewart
- Moriah Jefferson
- Morgan Tuck

The three players helped Team USA win all five games at the championship event and win the gold medal. Tuck was the leading scorer, not just on the USA team, but among all participants, scoring almost 18 points per game. Her 54.2% field goal shooting percentage just edged out Stewart's 54.0% to lead the international field. Jefferson was second in the assists category, and the assists to turnover ratio. Stewart was awarded the Tournament Most Valuable Player award.

==== USA 3x3 ====
Two UConn players, one current, one a former player, were on the four-player squad representing the US in the Women's 3x3 World Championship:

- Ann Strother
- Bria Hartley

The USA Basketball organization held a competition to determine which team would represent the US in Greece. Hartley was on the team which won the overall event. Strother also competed at the event, but the team she was on came in third. However, one member of the winning team, Alyssa Thomas, had a medical issue that prevented her from continuing with the team. Strother was asked to fill in for Thomas.

The USA team won many of the early games easily. In the 3x3 rules, the game ends after 10 minutes, or until one team reaches 21 or more points. The USA team reached 21 or more points in each of the first seven games. The semi-final and final games were much closer. In the semi-final game, the USA prevailed over Australia 19–18. In the final game against France, the USA team fell behind 7–2, but again won by a single point, 17–16.

=== Roster changes ===
The single senior, Tiffany Hayes graduated, and was selected as the second pick in the second round of the 2012 WNBA draft (14th overall) by the Atlanta Dream.

Two players decided to transfer. Michala Johnson decided to play closer to home, and transferred to Wisconsin, where her younger sister was set to join the team in 2013. Lauren Engeln decided to transfer to Boston College.

Connecticut's incoming class of freshman included three players: Breanna Stewart, Morgan Tuck, and Moriah Jefferson. The incoming class was rated the number one recruiting class, by ESPN.

Stewart is a 6'4" (1.93 m) forward who can also play guard positions. She is from North Syracuse, New York, where she played for Cicero – North Syracuse High School. Stewart has extensive basketball experience in addition to her high school experience. She played with her high school team in national tournaments such as the Tournament of Champions, held in Phoenix, Arizona, and the Hoophall Classic, held in Springfield, Massachusetts. She has also played for a number of USA basketball teams, including U16, U17, U18, and U19 teams. She was invited to the Pan American team while still in high school, only the second player, other than Nancy Lieberman, to earn an invitation as a high school player. Stewart was named the girl's high school basketball player of the year by both Gatorade and Naismith for 2012. She was honored to be named the USA Basketball Female Athlete of the Year in 2011, an award rarely awarded to high school players.

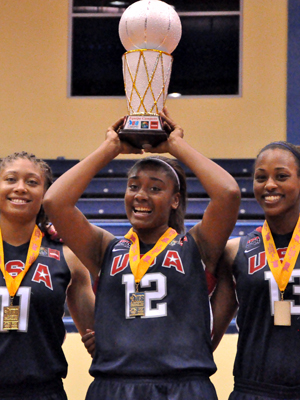
Morgan Tuck hoists the championship trophy after helping win the gold medal in the FIBA Americas U18 Championship

Tuck is a 6'2" (1.88 m) forward. She is from Bolingbrook, Illinois where she played for the Bolingbrook Raiders, coached by Tony Smith, where she helped the team to a four-year record of 110–9 with three state titles. Tuck was named the Gatorade player of the year for Illinois in 2012. She scored 2,460 points during her four years in high school, and recorded 992 rebounds. Tuck also has National Tournament and USA basketball experience. Her team competed in the Tournament of Champions, losing only to Stewart's team. She played on the 2010 gold-medal-winning U17 team, as well as the 2011 gold-medal-winning U19 team.

Jefferson is a 5'7" (1.70 m) guard from Glenn Heights, Texas. She is home-schooled, but played in the Texas Home Educators Sports Association. She was considered by ESPN as "highest rated point guard in the class of 2012". She is both a McDonald's and WBCA All-American, and competed in the WBCA All-American all-star game. She earned a position on the USA Basketball U18 team, where she started all five games, helping the US to a gold medal at the FIBA Americas U18 Championship.

== Roster ==
2012–13 Connecticut Huskies women's basketball team
Players
Coaches

Pos.	#	Name	Height	Year	Previous school	Hometown
G	13	Brianna Banks	5 ft 9 in (1.75 m)	So	Fayette County	Newnan, Ga.
F/C	32	Heather Buck	6 ft 3 in (1.91 m)	RS Sr	Stonington	Stonington, Conn.
C	31	Stefanie Dolson	6 ft 5 in (1.96 m)	Jr	Minisink Valley	Port Jervis, N.Y.
G	5	Caroline Doty	5 ft 10 in (1.78 m)	RS Sr	Germantown Academy	Doylestown, Pa.
G	34	Kelly Faris	5 ft 11 in (1.8 m)	Sr	Heritage Christian	Plainfield, Indiana
G	14	Bria Hartley	5 ft 7 in (1.7 m)	Jr	North Babylon	North Babylon, New York
G	4	Moriah Jefferson	5 ft 7 in (1.7 m)	Fr	Home-schooled	Glen Heights, Texas
F	23	Kaleena Mosqueda-Lewis	6 ft 0 in (1.83 m)	So	Mater Dei	Anaheim Hills, California
F	30	Breanna Stewart	6 ft 4 in (1.93 m)	Fr	Cicero North	Syracuse, New York
C	41	Kiah Stokes	6 ft 3 in (1.91 m)	So	Linn-Mar	Marion, Iowa
F	3	Morgan Tuck	6 ft 2 in (1.88 m)	Fr	Bolingbrook	Bolingbrook, Illinois

Head coach

Geno Auriemma

Assistant coach(es)

Chris Dailey
Shea Ralph
Marisa Moseley

Legend

- (C) Team captain
- (S) Suspended
- (I) Ineligible
- (W) Walk-on
- Injured
- Current redshirt

Roster
Last update: 2013-10-03

== Games ==
=== Pre-season ===
Connecticut opened against the Indiana University of Pennsylvania Crimson Hawks. Two players, Hartley and Doty were nursing injuries, and did not play. IUP scored the first two points, but their initial 2–0 lead did not last long. Everyone on the UConn team who played, scored, with six players reaching double figures. Each of the three freshman on the team scored in double figures. The final score was 105–28.

=== Regular season ===
UConn opened the regular season with a home game against the College of Charleston. Charleston scored the first two points, but the Huskies responded with a 19–0 run to take command of the game. Every UConn player scored, with freshman Breanna Stewart scoring 21 to tie Maya Moore for most points scored in an initial game as a Husky. UConn went on to win 103–39.

UConn faced their first ranked team of the season with an away game against Texas A&M, the 2011 national champion. The Huskies opened up with an 11-2 run, prompting Gary Blair to call a timeout ahead of the scheduled media timeout. The Aggies responded by cutting the lead to four points, but Connecticut then scored nine straight. The lead was twelve points at halftime, but ballooned to 31 by the end of the game. Stefanie Dolson led all scorers with 24 points on 11-15 shooting. Kiah Stokes led the team with seven rebounds, and recorded three of the team's five blocks. The final score favored the Huskies 81-50.

=== Paradise Jam ===
The team flew from Texas to St. Thomas on Monday, arriving in time to watch the men's championship game between Connecticut and New Mexico. Although the Huskies men's team managed to take a late lead, New Mexico responded to win the championship. The women's team had some time on the beach and in the sun before playing their first game on Thanksgiving Day. They faced Wake Forest, but the game was never close. The Huskies scored the first twelve points, and extended the margin to a 45-12 halftime score. All players saw action, and the final score was 95-34 in favor of Connecticut, with the Huskies shooting almost 69% from the floor. Dolson hit her first career three point attempt, while Stewart led all scorers with 20 points.

In the second game of the Paradise Jam Tournament, UConn met Marist. UConn opened in full court pressure, which helped to open up a 22-9 early lead. Then the Huskies went on an 18-0 run to extend the lead. Breanna Stewart scored 20 points and recorded 10 rebounds for her first career double-double. Connecticut went on to win 81-39. The win represented the 48th consecutive in-season tournament win, a streak extending back to 1992.

Connecticut faced 14th ranked Purdue in the finals of the Paradise Jam Tournament. Each team entered the final game with a 2-0 record. Purdue was successful beyond the arc, hitting 59% of their three-point attempts (13 of 22), but hit only six two point shots. UConn started out with an 11-0 run, and never trailed. UConn went on to win 91-57. Breanna Stewart was named the Tournament most valuable player, the only freshman to earn MVP honors in the thirteen-year history of the Paradise Jam other than Maya Moore in 2007. Kaleena Lewis was also named to the All-tournament team.

=== Regular season continued ===
UConn returned to regular season play with a game against Colgate. Before the game started the President of UConn, Susan Herbst, and her brother Jeffrey, the President of Colgate, exchanged jerseys at midcourt. The game was never close, as UConn score twelve points before Colgate scored. Briana Banks came off the bench to score 20 points, a career high, while Kelly Faris has 15 points by halftime. The final score in favor of Connecticut was 101–41.

UConn faced Maryland in their next game, the first opponent ranked by the Coaches poll in the top ten. The huskies started out scoring the first six points, and opened up a nine-point lead early but Maryland came back and cut the lead to two points. They never took the lead, and UConn won 63–48. The UConn defense, led by Kelly Faris, held All-American Alyssa Thomas to only six points, while forcing her to commit eight turnovers. Faris hit four of her six field goal attempts, and added seven rebounds, eight steals and seven assists.

Kaleena Mosqueda-Lewis was nursing a quad injury, and cleared to play in the game again Penn State shortly before the game. he UConn team had been behind all of seventeen seconds in the first seven games, but the Lady Lions took a lead in the first half. Penn State was within three points well into the second half, but Lewis scored 25 points to lead all scorers, and help ensure that UConn would go on to win their eighth game of the year 67–52.

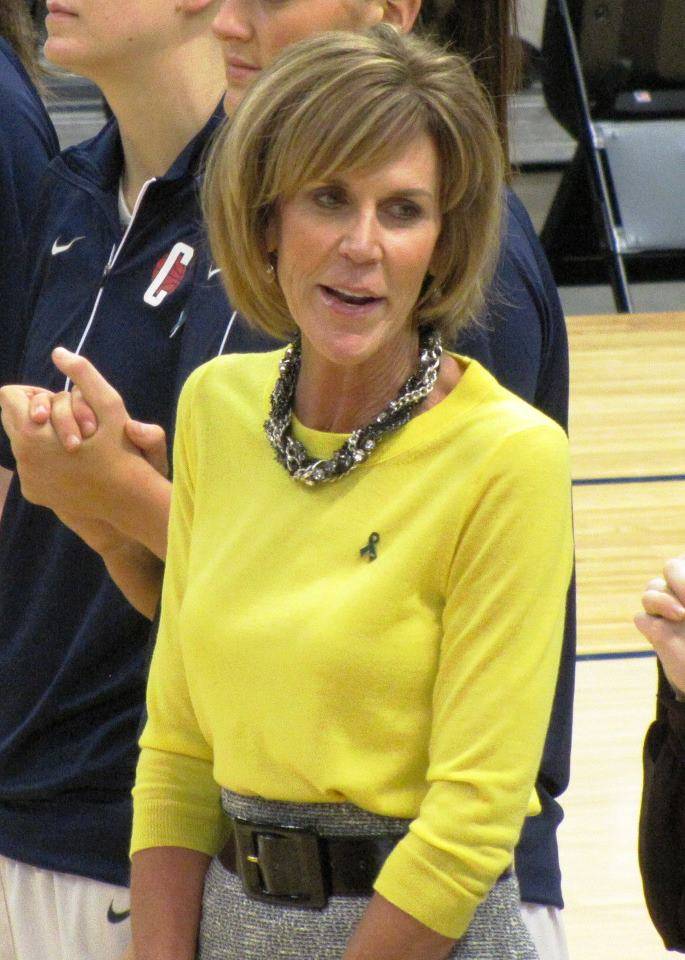
Chris Dailey – Associate head coach, UConn women's basketball team

After a long break for exams, the UConn team faced Oakland, a 5-5 team that would have a challenge against second ranked Connecticut under the best of circumstances, but the Grizzlies had two of their best players out with injuries. The Huskies scored the first 14 points of the game, and allowed only two baskets in the first half, reaching a season best 61 points by halftime. The Oakland team did start off the second half with five consecutive points, but couldn't get close. UConn's Bria Hartley had her best game of the year, following early season injuries and a slow return, but scored 19 points in the first half, and ended up with 21 points. The final score in favor of the Huskies was 97–25, the fewest points allowed by Connecticut so far this season.

While it goes into the books as an away game, the match up between UConn and Hartford, held three miles from their downtown arena on December 22, didn't seem like much of a travel game, although they did have to remember to wear their away jerseys. It was the first time the team had played on the University of Hartford's court since 1990.

A ceremony to honor the victims of the Sandy Hook shooting occurred just before the start of the game.

The Huskies started out strong, hitting over 60% from the field in the first half, building a 51–15 halftime lead. Breanna Stewart came off the bench to lead all scorers with 27, but four other Huskies were in double figures. The final score in favor of Connecticut was 102–45.

The next game featured a #1 versus #2 match up. Stanford had beaten Baylor earlier in the season, and was voted to the top spot in the polls, where they had been for the past few weeks. Connecticut came into the game ranked #2. In addition to the #1 versus #2 story line, Stanford had the longest active home winning streak. At 82 games, they had not lost at home since 2007. The rivalry featured the added dimension that Stanford had been the team to break UConn's record winning streak which reached 90 games before being stopped by the Cardinal. Stanford's head coach Tara Vanderveer called the game "a measuring stick". This was the Huskies' fourth trip to Maples Pavilion, a venue where the team had never won.

Stanford scored the first two points of the game, but then the Huskies went to work. Despite sub-par shooting by Connecticut, they led 31–13 at the half, and extended the lead in the second half. UConn held the Cardinal to 19.3% field goal shooting, the lowest percentage in school history. Kaleena Mosqueda Lewis lead all scorers with 19 points. Three other UConn players reached double digits, while for Stanford, Chiney Ogwumike scored 18, but no other Cardinal reached double digits. UConn's next game was at Oregon on New Year's Eve, in the first game of a home-and-home series. Carline Doty led the Huskies to a 95–51 victory with 14 points, twelve rebounds, and seven assists. Coach Auriemma said that he had never seen her play better.

A few days after ascending to the number one ranking, UConn played Notre Dame, a team that had beaten UConn four of the last times they have met, including twice in the Final Four. The game came down to the final shot, but Kaleena Mosqueda-Lewis missed a three-point shot near the end of the game, and Notre Dame held on to win 73–72.

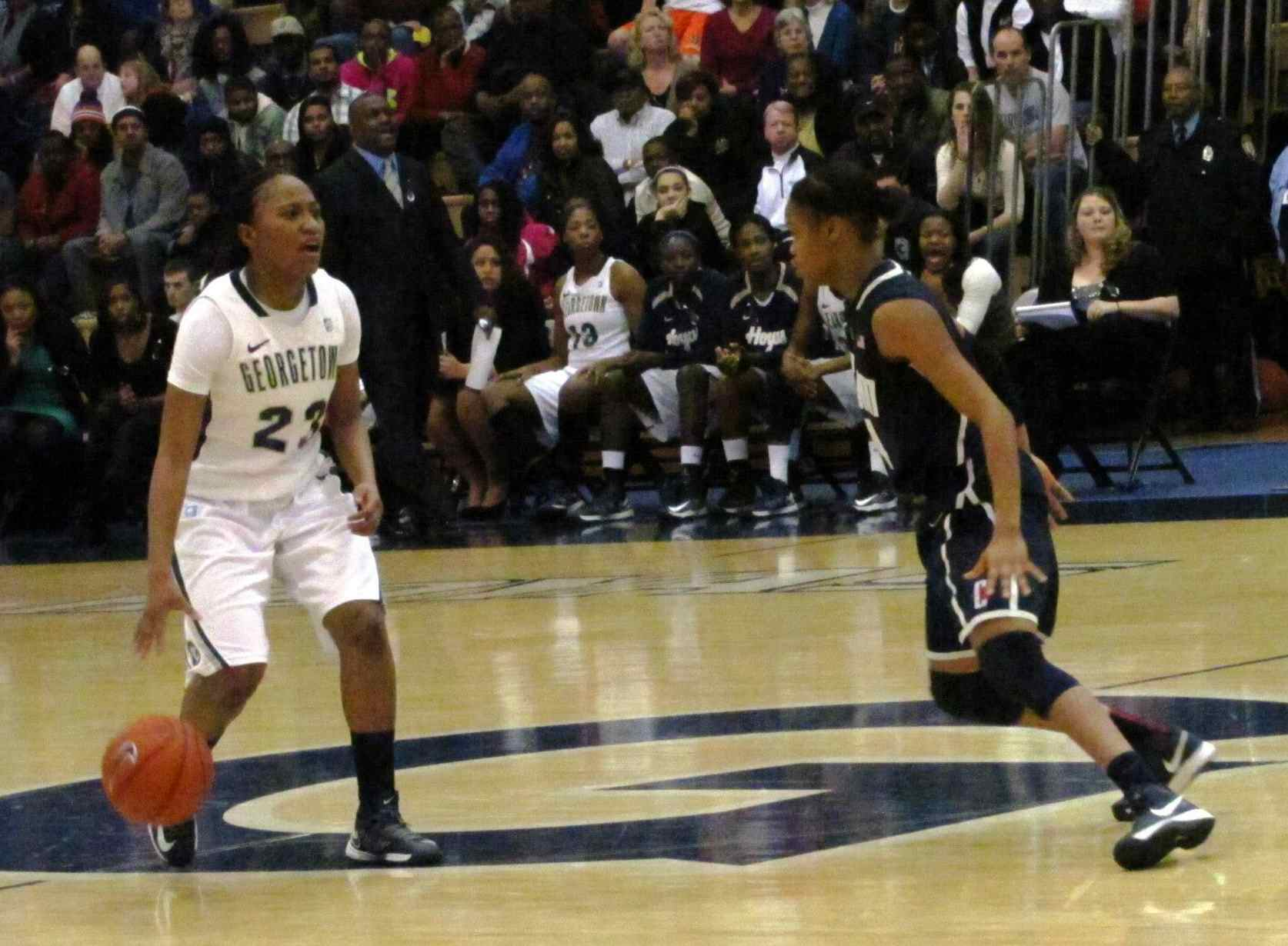
Moriah Jefferson in game against Georgetown

UConn's next opponent was Georgetown, at McDonough Gymnasium. Moriah Jefferson had her best game of the year, with seven steals, along with nine points and six rebounds. Coach Auriemma called her the "star of the day. The win extended another UConn record: The last time they had lost back-to-back games was March 7, 1993, a date preceding the birth of six of the players on the team. UConn had now played 707 games without losing consecutively. For perspective, the second longest active streak is 178 games, held by Duke.

The Marquette game was mentioned with the side story of the Connecticut vs Tennessee rivalry in women's basketball because of the Golden Eagles' assistant coach Tyler Summitt, the son of the now-retired Lady Vols head coach, participating in his first game against Auriemma. Minor injuries nagged the Huskies as they prepared to play Marquette without Breann Stewart, who turned an ankle in practices. Then shortly after the start of the game, Bria Hartley, who has missed some time with an ankle injury, re-injured it and sat out the remainder of the game. Those missing players weren't enough to provide an edge for Marquette, as the Huskies opened up a 35 point halftime lead, and won the game 85–51.

Hartley recovered from her ankle problems in time for the Louisville game, scoring 16 points and seven rebounds. Stefanie Dolson also scored 16 points, helping lead the Huskies to a 72–58 win.

UConn's next opponent was Duke, the only remaining undefeated team in Division I college basketball. The first half was very close, with the lead changing seven times. At halftime, the Huskies lead, but only by two points. At halftime, Coach Auriemma challenged them, and the team, especially Kelly Faris, stepped up. She ended up with 18 points, 12 rebounds and 6 assists, but, as is often the case, the statistics do not tell the whole story. She was assigned to guard Duke's Chelsea Gray, who has been touted as one of the best passers in the game. She held Gray to two points and four assists, while helping to force four turnovers. Coach Auriemma remarked, " you just saw a performance people are going to be talking about for a long time". UConn went on to extend the two point halftime margin to a 30-point victory, winning 79–49.

UConn continued its dominance over Cincinnati, winning 67–31 over a team that is winless in the Big East this year, and winless all-time against the Huskies. The Bearcats scored the first two baskets of the game, and led 4–0, but would only score one more basket in the first half. Stefanie Dolson was the leading scorer, with 15 points, eleven of which came early in the game.

Villanova was known for relying on three point shots. They did not hit their first until late in the first half of the game, which contributed to a 44–17 halftime margin. While the Wildcats hit more threes in the second half, it was not enough. Kaleena Mosquesda-Lewis hit five of her six three point attempts, and Stefanie Dolson scored 20 points on eight for eleven shooting to lead the Huskies to a 76–43 victory.

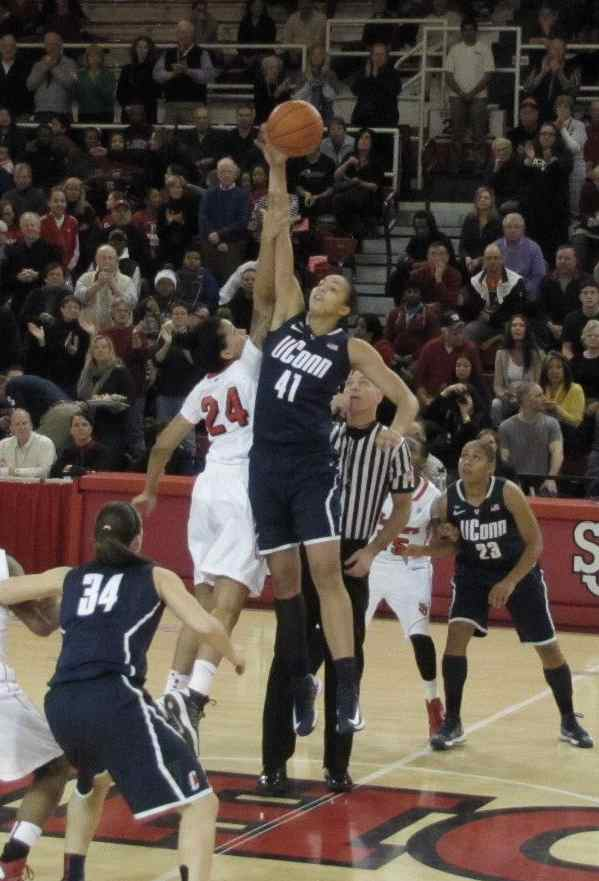
Kiah Stokes, in her first career start, soars to secure the tip-off in the game against St. Johns 2013

Last season, St. Johns stunned UConn at home, ending a 99-game winning streak with a 57–56 victory, but UConn followed that up with a 31-point victory in the Big East tournament. The game against unranked St. Johns this year started out more like the upset, with the Red Storm leading several times. The score was tied at 57 pints apiece with about two minutes to go, but Kaleena Mosqueda-Lewis scored a three-point play, and Kelly Faris followed with a three-pointer to secure a 71–65 victory. Stokes started her first game in place of Stefanie Dolson, who sat out due to illness.

UConn faced Marquette for the second time this season, one of two teams appearing twice of the schedule (the other is Notre Dame). Marquette scored first, hitting a three-pointer on their first possession. UConn would go on to score nine points before Marquette could get the ball past mid-court, and a total of 19 before Marquette would score again. The Huskies scored 62 in the first half, while allowing Marquette only 17 points. Connecticut eased up on the offense in the second half with only 32 points, but held Marquette to 20 points, resulting in a 94–37 win. The Auriemma-Summitt rivalry was now at 15-9 Auriemma.

DePaul's trip to Connecticut started out poorly, and didn't get better. They were scheduled to arrive Saturday in preparation for the game on Sunday, but a winter blizzard delayed their departure until Sunday morning. There were delays getting the plane ready for departure; when they arrived, the bus scheduled to pick them up was late due to a traffic accident stalling traffic. They arrived at the arena not long before tip-off. DePaul's best player, Anna Martin, was not available due to injury. Once the game began, Stefanie Dolson scored 22 points in the first half, and Bria Hartley had 18 points for the game to help the Huskies to a 91–44 victory.

The last time UConn lost to Providence was on March 7, 1993. The three freshman on the UConn team were not yet born. This game would not break the 27 game winning streak against the school. Kelly Faris made her 100th consecutive start, and her 16 points helped the team score more than 100 points. Moriah Jefferson scored a career high 13 points, to join six players on the team with double-digit scoring. The final score was 105–49 in favor of Connecticut.

The Huskies next faced Rutgers, an unranked team with only five Big East wins. However, the game was on the home court of Rutgers, and the team was trying to win C. Vivian Stringers 900th game. Early in the game, the Scarlet Knight had a lead, which they extended to 10 points at one times. Coach Auriemma removed four of the starters, to express his displeasure. The bench delivered, and Connecticut retook the lead, ending up with a 65–45 victory.

UConn then faced Baylor, the number 1 team in the country, at home, in front of a sellout crowd of 16,294. Baylor's Brittney Griner, generally acknowledged as the top college player in the country, was held to four points in the first half. In the second half, she scored 21 points, and when Connecticut doubled her, she was able to pass to an open post player for a layup. UConn had a three-point lead at halftime, but Baylor scored 50 points in the second half to retake the lead and win the game 76–70.

UConn hosted Seton Hall at Gampel. The game was more notable for milestones than for the score, which was 90–30 in favor of the Huskies. Connecticut has beaten Seton Hall 29 consecutive times. Two UConn players reached the 1000 point career milestone, senior Kelly Faris and sophomore Kaleena Mosqueda-Lewis. Each scored 18 points in the game.

In the last home game of the regular season, UConn faced Pittsburgh, a team still looking for its first Big East win of the season. Breanna Stewart had 15 points, along with nine rebounds and four blocks. Kaleena Mosqueda-Lewis had a double-double with 19 points and 13 rebounds. The win was coach Auriemma's 401st Big East win. Only he and Tara Vanderveer have 400 or more conference wins in their career.

In the next to last game of the regular season, Kaleena Mosqueda-Lewis set a career high for points with 32 and teammate Stefanie Dolson tied her career high with 25 points. Kelly Faris also reached a milestone. She now has over 1,000 points, 750 rebounds, 500 assists and 250 steals, a level only reached by one other Connecticut player in history, Maya Moore. The team went on to win the game over South Florida 85–51.

=== NCAA tournament ===
==== Idaho ====
UConn entered the NCAA Tournament without winning either the Big East Regular season or the Big East tournament for the first time in 19 years. Their first opponent was Idaho, winner of the Western Athletic Conference title, playing in only their second ever NCAA Tournament game. The game was never close as UConn had a 74-point lead at one time, before relaxing on defense, and allowing Idaho to hit several three-pointers and cut the lead down to the final 68 point margin, 105–37. Kaleena Mosqueda-Lewis had 22 points, all in the first half.

==== Vanderbilt ====
The second-round game was against Vanderbilt. The game started out much more competitive that the game against Idaho, with UConn managing a 13-point lead at halftime. However, the Huskies scored 17 consecutive points to start the second half, and out the game out of reach. Kaleena Mosqueda-Lewis repeated her 22-point performance. One of her three-point goals in the second half gave her 108 treys for the season, a new UConn record.

==== Maryland ====
UConn's next opponent was Maryland, a repeat of a regular season match up the Huskies had won by 15 points. The game was expected to be, and turned out to be a physical battle. near the end of the first half, Kelly Faris was "hammered" and went to the floor hard, but no foul was called. Coach Auriemma was irate, and ended up with a technical foul. Maryland scored a free throw, and scored again on the ensuing possession, cutting the lead to single digits. However, Connecticut opened up a large lead in the second half, and went on to win, 76–50. Mosqueda-Lewis was high scorer with 17, but shred the honors with Breanna Stewart, also with 17 points.

==== Kentucky ====
In the Elite Eight round, UConn faced Kentucky, the same opponent they had faced in the prior year Elite Eight game in Rhode Island. The game started close, with Kentucky holding a tiny one point lead 23–22 with just over nine minutes to go in the first half. The UConn scored the next seventeen points, and finished the half on a 26–3 run to take a 48–26 lead at halftime. Dolson was playing on sore legs, and had not fully practiced the last few days, She played 17 minutes in the first half, but was able to sit on the bench much of the second half. Mosqueda-Lewis scored eight of the team's first 14 points, but then went to the bench for the rest of the half with her second foul. The freshman stepped up, with 5' 7" Jefferson even recording a block. Jefferson also added four steals, some of which culminated in lay ups. Hartley also had four steals. Kiah Stokes added three blocks while Stewart had three blocks, one of which was a game closing exclamation point. Stewart's 21 points led the team, and helped her to earn the tournament Most Outstanding Player honors. The win advanced the Huskies to the Final Four for the sixth consecutive time, setting an NCAA record for most consecutive trips.

== Schedule ==
The XL Center is the Veterans Memorial Coliseum at XL Center.

Date time, TV	Rank^{#}	Opponent^{#}	Result	Record	High points	High rebounds	High assists	Site (attendance) city, state
Exhibition
November 2, 2012*; 7:00 pm		Indiana Univ. (PA)	W 105–28		–	–	–	Gampel Pavilion; Storrs, Connecticut
November 7, 2012*; 7:00 pm		Holy Family	W 119–50		–	–	–	XL Center; Hartford, Connecticut
Regular season
November 11, 2012*; 1:30 pm		College of Charleston	W 103–39	1–0	–	–	–	Gampel Pavilion; Storrs, Connecticut
November 18, 2012*; 2:30 pm		at Texas A&M	W 81–50	2–0	–	–	–	College Station, Texas
November 22, 2012*; 6:00 pm		vs. Wake Forest; Paradise Jam	W 95–34	3–0	–	–	–	St. Thomas, U.S. V.I.
November 23, 2012*; 8:15 pm		vs. Marist; Paradise Jam	W 81–39	4–0	–	–	–	St. Thomas, U.S. V.I.
November 24, 2012*; 8:15 pm		vs. Purdue; Paradise Jam	W 91–57	5–0	–	–	–	St. Thomas, U.S. V.I.
November 28, 2012*; 7:00 pm		Colgate	W 101–41	6–0	–	–	–	XL Center; Hartford, Connecticut
December 3, 2012*; 7:00 pm		Maryland; Jimmy V Classic	W 63–48	7–0	–	–	–	XL Center; Hartford, Connecticut
December 6, 2012*; 7:00 pm		Penn State	W 67–52	8–0	–	–	–	Gampel Pavilion; Storrs, Connecticut
December 19, 2012*; 7:00 pm		Oakland	W 97–25	9–0	–	–	–	XL Center; Hartford, Connecticut
December 22, 2012*; 1:00 pm		at Hartford	W 102–45	10–0	–	–	–	Chase Arena at Reich Family Pavilion; West Hartford, CT
December 29, 2012*; 4:00 pm		at Stanford	W 61–35	11–0	–	–	–	Palo Alto, California
December 31, 2012*; 3:00 pm		at Oregon	W 95–51	12–0	–	–	–	Eugene, Oregon
January 5, 2013; 4:00 pm		Notre Dame	L 72–73	12–1	–	–	–	Gampel Pavilion; Storrs, Connecticut
January 9, 2013; 7:30 pm		at Georgetown	W 75–48	13–1	–	–	–	Washington, D.C.
January 12, 2013; 4:00 pm		at Marquette	W 85–51	14–1	–	–	–	Milwaukee
January 15, 2013; 9:00 pm		Louisville	W 72–58	15–1	16 – 2 Tied	9 – Dolson	7 – Faris	XL Center (8,702); Hartford, Connecticut
January 19, 2013; 4:00 pm		Syracuse	W 87–62	16–1	–	–	–	XL Center; Hartford, Connecticut
January 21, 2013*; 7:00 pm		Duke	W 79–49	17–1	–	–	–	Gampel Pavilion; Storrs, Connecticut
January 26, 2013; 8:00 pm		at Cincinnati	W 67–31	18–1	–	–	–	Cincinnati, Ohio
January 29, 2013; 7:00 pm		Villanova	W 76–43	19–1	–	–	–	XL Center; Hartford, Connecticut
February 2, 2013; 2:00 pm		at St. John's	W 71–65	20–1	–	–	–	New York, New York
February 5, 2013; 7:00 pm		Marquette	W 94–37	21–1	–	–	–	Gampel Pavilion; Storrs, Connecticut
February 10, 2013; 3:30 pm		DePaul	W 91–46	22–1	–	–	–	Gampel Pavilion; Storrs, Connecticut
February 12, 2013; 7:00 pm		at Providence	W 105–49	23–1	–	–	–	Providence, Rhode Island
February 16, 2013; 4:00 pm		at Rutgers	W 65–45	24–1	–	–	–	Piscataway, New Jersey
February 18, 2013*; 9:00 pm		Baylor	L 70–76	24–2	–	–	–	XL Center; Hartford, Connecticut
February 23, 2013; 4:00 pm		Seton Hall	W 90–30	25–2	–	–	–	Gampel Pavilion; Storrs, Connecticut
February 26, 2013; 7:00 pm		Pittsburgh	W 76–36	26–2	–	–	–	XL Center; Hartford, Connecticut
March 2, 2013; 12:00 pm		at USF	W 85–51	27–2	–	–	–	Tampa, Florida
March 4, 2013; 7:00 pm		at Notre Dame	L 87–96 (3OT)	27–3	–	–	–	South Bend, Ind.
Big East women's tournament
March 10, 2013; 6:00 pm, ESPN3	No. 3	DePaul; Big East women's basketball tournament	W 91–61	28–3	21 – Stewart	9 – Mosqueda-Lewis	7 – Hrynko	XL Center (NA); Hartford, Connecticut
March 11, 2013; 8:00 pm, ESPNU	No. 3	No. 22 Syracuse; Big East Women's Basketball Tournament	W 64–51	29–3	14 – 3 tied	12 – Faris	8 – Coffey	XL Center (NA); Hartford, Connecticut
March 12, 2013; 7:00 pm, ESPN	No. 3	No. 2 Notre Dame; Big East women's basketball tournament/rivalry	L 59–61	29–4	23 – McBride	11 – Dolson	6 – Diggins	XL Center (9,085); Hartford, Connecticut
NCAA women's tournament
March 23, 2013*; 1:36 pm, ESPN2	No. 3	vs. Idaho; First Round	W 105–37	30–4	22 – Mosqueda-Lewis	11 – Stokes	7 – Hartley	Gampel Pavilion (4,627); Storrs, Connecticut
March 25, 2013*; 7:05 pm, ESPN2	No. 3	vs. Vanderbilt; Second Round	W 77–44	31–4	22 – Mosqueda-Lewis	9 – Dolson	4 – Tied	Gampel Pavilion (4,483); Storrs, Connecticut
March 30, 2013*; 2:39 pm, ESPN	No. 3	vs. Maryland; Sweet Sixteen	W 76–50	32–4	17 – Tied	11 – DeVaughn	3 – 4 tied	Webster Bank Arena (8,494); Bridgeport, Connecticut
April 1, 2013*; 7:30 pm, ESPN	No. 3	vs. Kentucky; Elite Eight	W 83–53	33–4	21 – Stewart	11 – Dolson	4 – Dolson	Webster Bank Arena (8,594); Bridgeport, Connecticut
April 7, 2013*; 9:07 pm, ESPN	No. 3	vs. No. 2 Notre Dame; Final Four/Rivalry	W 83–65	34–4	29 – Stewart	9 – Braker	9 – Diggins	New Orleans Arena (17,545); New Orleans
April 9, 2013*; 8:30 pm, ESPN	No. 3	vs. No. 16 Louisville; Championship	W 93–60	35–4	23 – Stewart	9 – 3 tied	6 – Tied	New Orleans Arena (17,545); New Orleans
*Non-conference game. ^{#}Rankings from AP Poll. (#) Tournament seedings in parentheses. All times are in EST.

== Awards and honors ==
- Head Coach Geno Auriemma received the NIAF Special Achievement Award in Sports, awarded by the National Italian American Foundation.
- Breanna Stewart earned the Most Valuable Player award at the 2012 FIBA Americas U18 Championship
- Moriah Jefferson, Breanna Stewart, and Morgan Tuck each were awarded a gold medal for winning the 2012 FIBA Americas U18 Championship
- Bria Hartley was awarded a gold medal for winning the 2012 FIBA Women's 3x3 World Championship
- Breanna Stewart earned the Most Valuable Player award at the 2012 Paradise Jam Tournament
- Breanna Stewart was awarded the Most Outstanding Player of the Final Four, the first freshman to win the award since 1987.
- Breanna Stewart, Bria Hartley, Kelly Faris and Kaleena Mosqueda-Lewis were named to the 2013 NCAA Final Four All-Tournament team.

== Team players drafted into the WNBA ==
Round	Pick	Player	NBA Club
1	11	Kelly Faris	Connecticut Sun

== See also ==
- Connecticut Huskies women's basketball
- 2012–13 Connecticut Huskies men's basketball team
