= 2012–13 Notre Dame Fighting Irish women's basketball team =

Intercollegiate basketball season

2012–13 Notre Dame Fighting Irish women's basketball

Big East regular season and tournament champions

NCAA tournament, Final Four
- Conference: Big East Conference

Ranking
- Coaches: No. 3
- AP: No. 2
- Record: 35–2 (16–0 Big East)
- Head coach: Muffet McGraw (26th season)
- Assistant coaches: Carol Owens; Beth Cunningham; Niele Ivey
- Home arena: Edmund P. Joyce Center

2012–13 Big East Conference women's basketball standings
	Conf.				Overall
Team	W		L	PCT	W		L	PCT
No. 2 Notre Dame†	16	–	0	1.000	35	–	2	.946
No. 3 Connecticut	14	–	2	.875	35	–	4	.897
No. 16 Louisville	11	–	5	.688	29	–	9	.763
St. John's	11	–	5	.688	18	–	13	.581
South Florida	9	–	7	.563	22	–	11	.667
Villanova	9	–	7	.563	21	–	11	.656
DePaul	9	–	7	.563	21	–	12	.636
Rutgers	7	–	9	.438	16	–	14	.533
Marquette	7	–	9	.438	16	–	16	.500
Georgetown	5	–	11	.313	15	–	16	.484
Seton Hall	5	–	11	.313	11	–	20	.355
Cincinnati	4	–	12	.250	12	–	18	.400
Providence	2	–	14	.125	7	–	23	.233
Pittsburgh	0	–	16	.000	9	–	21	.300
† 2013 Big East Basketball Tournament winner As of April 9, 2013; Rankings from AP poll

The 2012–13 Notre Dame Fighting Irish women's basketball team represented University of Notre Dame during the 2012–13 NCAA Division I women's basketball season. The Fighting Irish, led by twenty-sixth year head coach Muffet McGraw, played their home games at the Purcell Pavilion at the Joyce Center and played their final season as members of the Big East Conference. They finished the season with 35–2 overall, 16–0 in Big East play to win the Big East regular season and tournament titles. They earned an automatic bid to the 2013 NCAA Division I women's basketball tournament where they defeated Tennessee-Martin in the first round, Iowa in the second round, Kansas in the Sweet Sixteen, and Duke in the Elite Eight to make it to their fifth Final Four, where they were defeated by rival UConn in the National semifinals.

== Roster ==
2012–13 Notre Dame Fighting Irish women's basketball team
Players
Coaches

Pos.	#	Name	Height	Year	Previous school	Hometown
G	4	Skylar Diggins	5 ft 9 in (1.75 m)	Sr	Washington	South Bend, IN
F	11	Natalie Achonwa	6 ft 3 in (1.91 m)	Jr	St. Mary's Catholic	Guelph, ON
F	44	Ariel Braker	6 ft 1 in (1.85 m)	Jr	Grosse Pointe North	Grosse Pointe Woods, MI
G	22	Madison Cable	5 ft 11 in (1.8 m)	So	Mt. Lebanon	Mt. Lebanon, PA
G	3	Whitney Holloway	5 ft 4 in (1.63 m)	So	Montini Catholic	Plainfield, IL
G	21	Kayla McBride	5 ft 11 in (1.8 m)	Jr	Villa Maria Academy	Erie, PA
G	32	Jewell Loyd	5 ft 10 in (1.78 m)	Fr	Niles West High School	Lincolnwood, IL
F	34	Markisha Wright	6 ft 2 in (1.88 m)	So	Des Moines East	Des Moines, IA

Head coach

Muffet McGraw

Assistant coach(es)

Carol Owens
Beth Cunningham
Niele Ivey

Legend

- (C) Team captain
- (S) Suspended
- (I) Ineligible
- (W) Walk-on
- Injured
- Current redshirt

== Schedule ==
Date time, TV	Rank^{#}	Opponent^{#}	Result	Record	Site (attendance) city, state
Exhibition
Regular season
Big East tournament
Mar 10, 2013*	No. 2	vs. South Florida; Quarterfinals	W 75–66	29–1	XL Center; Hartford, Connecticut
Mar 11, 2013*	No. 2	vs. No. 16 Louisville; Semifinals	W 83–59	30–1	XL Center; Hartford, Connecticut
Mar 12, 2013*	No. 2	at No. 3 Connecticut; Championship game	W 61–59	31–1	XL Center (9,085); Hartford, Connecticut
NCAA tournament
Mar 24, 2013*	(1 E) No. 2	vs. (16 E) Tennessee-Martin; First round	W 97–64	32–1	Carver-Hawkeye Arena; Iowa City, Iowa
Mar 26, 2013*	(1 E) No. 2	(9 E) Iowa; Second round	W 74–57	33–1	Carver-Hawkeye Arena (4,942); Iowa City, Iowa
Mar 31, 2013*	(1 E) No. 2	vs. Kansas; Regional Semifinal – Sweet Sixteen	W 93–63	34–1	Ted Constant Convocation Center; Norfolk, Virginia
Apr 2, 2013*	(1 E) No. 2	vs. No. 5 Duke; Regional Final – Elite Eight	W 87–76	35–1	Ted Constant Convocation Center; Norfolk, Virginia
April 7, 2013*; 9:07 pm2, ESPN	(1 E)	vs. No. 3 Connecticut; National Semifinal – Final Four/Rivalry	L 65–83	35–2	New Orleans Arena (17,545); New Orleans, Louisiana
*Non-conference game. ^{#}Rankings from AP Poll. (#) Tournament seedings in parentheses. All times are in Eastern Time.

== See also ==
2012–13 Notre Dame Fighting Irish men's basketball team
