= 2012–13 Louisville Cardinals women's basketball team =

Intercollegiate basketball season

2012–13 Louisville Cardinals women's basketball

NCAA tournament, Runner-up
- Conference: Big East

Ranking
- Coaches: No. 2
- AP: No. 16
- Record: 29–9 (11–5 Big East)
- Head coach: Jeff Walz (6th season)
- Assistant coaches: Stephanie Norman; Samantha Williams; Sam Purcell
- Home arena: KFC Yum! Center

2012–13 Big East Conference women's basketball standings
	Conf.				Overall
Team	W		L	PCT	W		L	PCT
No. 2 Notre Dame†	16	–	0	1.000	35	–	2	.946
No. 3 Connecticut	14	–	2	.875	35	–	4	.897
No. 16 Louisville	11	–	5	.688	29	–	9	.763
St. John's	11	–	5	.688	18	–	13	.581
South Florida	9	–	7	.563	22	–	11	.667
Villanova	9	–	7	.563	21	–	11	.656
DePaul	9	–	7	.563	21	–	12	.636
Rutgers	7	–	9	.438	16	–	14	.533
Marquette	7	–	9	.438	16	–	16	.500
Georgetown	5	–	11	.313	15	–	16	.484
Seton Hall	5	–	11	.313	11	–	20	.355
Cincinnati	4	–	12	.250	12	–	18	.400
Providence	2	–	14	.125	7	–	23	.233
Pittsburgh	0	–	16	.000	9	–	21	.300
† 2013 Big East Basketball Tournament winner As of April 9, 2013; Rankings from AP poll

The 2012–13 Louisville Cardinals women's basketball team represented the University of Louisville during the 2012–13 NCAA Division I women's basketball season. The Cardinals, led by sixth-year head coach Jeff Walz, played their home games at the KFC Yum! Center as members of the Big East Conference before the conference would split. They finished the season 29–9, 11–5 in Big East play to land third in the regular season standings. They lost to Notre Dame in the semifinals of the Big East women's tournament. They received an at-large bid to the NCAA women's tournament. As the No. 5 seed in the Oklahoma City region, they defeated Middle Tennessee and Purdue to advance to the Sweet Sixteen. There they defeated No. 1 seed Baylor and No. 2 seed Tennessee in the Elite Eight to advance to the school's second Final Four. Playing as one of three Big East teams in the Final Four, they defeated Spokane regional champion California Golden Bears in the National semifinal round. In the National Championship, they lost to Connecticut.

== Roster ==
2012–13 Louisville Cardinals women's basketball team
Players
Coaches

Pos.	#	Name	Height	Year	Previous school	Hometown
F	00	Sara Hammond	6 ft 2 in (1.88 m)	So	Rockcastle County	Mount Vernon, Kentucky
G	1	Shelby Harper	5 ft 4 in (1.63 m)	Sr	Allen County Scottsville	Scottsville, Kentucky
G	2	Monny Niamke	5 ft 5 in (1.65 m)	So	Lindsey Wilson	Rouen, France
C	3	Sheronne Vails	6 ft 4 in (1.93 m)	Jr	Arundel	Odenton, Maryland
G	4	Antonita Slaughter	6 ft 1 in (1.85 m)	Jr	Christian Academy	Louisville, Kentucky
F	12	Shawnta' Dyer	6 ft 1 in (1.85 m)	RS So	Marion Harding	Marion, Ohio
F	13	Cortnee Walton	6 ft 3 in (1.91 m)	Fr	St. Mary's	Surprise, Arizona
G	15	Megan Deines	6 ft 1 in (1.85 m)	Fr	Glendale	Springfield, Missouri
G	21	Bria Smith	5 ft 10 in (1.78 m)	So	Christ the King	Massapequa, New York
G	22	Jude Schimmel	5 ft 6 in (1.68 m)	So	Franklin (Portland, OR)	Mission, Oregon
G	23	Shoni Schimmel	5 ft 9 in (1.75 m)	Jr	Franklin (Portland, OR)	Mission, Oregon
G	25	Tia Gibbs	5 ft 9 in (1.75 m)	RS Jr	Butler; Vanderbilt	Louisville, Kentucky
F	31	Asia Taylor	6 ft 1 in (1.85 m)	Sr	Whetstone	Columbus, Ohio

Head coach

- Jeff Walz (Northern Kentucky)

Assistant coach(es)

- Stephanie Norman (Arizona State)
- Samantha Williams (Auburn)
- Sam Purcell (Auburn)

Legend

- (C) Team captain
- (S) Suspended
- (I) Ineligible
- (W) Walk-on
- Injured
- Current redshirt

Roster

== Schedule and results ==
Date time, TV	Rank^{#}	Opponent^{#}	Result	Record	Site (attendance) city, state
Exhibition
10/31/2012*; 7:00 pm		Eckerd College	W 83–29	–	KFC Yum! Center (N/A); Louisville, KY
Regular season
11/9/2012*; 7:00 pm		Texas A&M	W 47–45	1–0	KFC Yum! Center (10,896); Louisville, KY
11/11/2012*; 12:00 pm		Portland	W 95–48	2–0	KFC Yum! Center (6,423); Louisville, KY
11/15/2012*; 8:00 pm		at Austin Peay	W 90–52	3–0	Dunn Center (826); Clarksville, TN
11/20/2012*; 7:00 pm		vs. UCF; Hardwood Tournament of Hope	W 94–73	4–0	Puerto Vallarta International Convention Center (136); Puerto Vallarta, Mexico
11/21/2012*; 9:30 pm	No. 6	vs. Gonzaga; Hardwood Tournament of Hope Semi-finals	W 55–42	5–0	Puerto Vallarta International Convention Center (167); Puerta Vallarta, Mexico
11/22/2012*; 9:30 pm		Oregon State; Hardwood Tournament of Hope	W 61–43	6–0	Puerto Vallarta International Convention Center (224); Puerto Vallarta, Mexico
11/26/2012*; 8:00 pm		at UT Martin	W 79–61	7–0	Kathleen and Tom Elam Center (3,223); Martin, TN
11/28/2012*; 7:30 pm		Eastern Kentucky	W 76–42	8–0	KFC Yum! Center (7,942); Louisville, KY
12/2/2012*; 6:00 pm, ESPN2	No. 6	No. 9 Kentucky; The Battle For The Bluegrass	L 47–48	8–1	KFC Yum! Center (15,453); Louisville, KY
12/8/2012*; 7:30 pm		Valparaiso	W 96–40	9–1	KFC Yum! Center (7,856); Louisville, KY
12/14/2012*; 9:00 pm		at Colorado	L 66–70	9–2	CU Events Center (3,408); Boulder, CO
12/18/2012*; 7:00 pm		Washington State	W 75–39	10–2	KFC Yum! Center (7,341); Louisville, KY
12/21/2012*; 7:00 pm		Wagner	W 106–32	11–2	KFC Yum! Center (7,876); Louisville, KY
12/31/2012*; 6:00 pm		Tennessee State	W 88–25	12–2	KFC Yum! Center (9,023); Louisville, KY
1/5/2013; 6:00 pm		at DePaul	L 80–86	12–3 (0–1)	McGrath–Phillips Arena (3,212); Chicago, IL
1/8/2013; 7:00 pm		Rutgers	W 66–57 ^{OT}	13–3 (1–1)	KFC Yum! Center (9,557); Louisville, KY
1/12/2013; 2:00 pm		at Providence	W 70–62	14–3 (2–1)	Alumni Hall (681); Providence, RI
1/15/2013; 9:00 pm		at Connecticut	L 58–72	14–4 (2–2)	XL Center (8,702); Storrs, CT
1/18/2013; 7:00 pm		Cincinnati	W 72–33	15–4 (3–2)	KFC Yum! Center (9,752); Louisville, KY
1/22/2013; 9:00 pm		at Marquette	W 64–63	16–4 (4–2)	Al McGuire Center (1,189); Milwaukee, WI
1/27/2013; 1:30 pm		St. John's	W 57–54	17–4 (5–2)	KFC Yum! Center (11,543); Louisville, KY
1/30/2013; 7:00 pm		South Florida	W 78–75	18–4 (6–2)	Sun Dome (1,227); Tampa, FL
2/2/2013; 2:00 pm		Georgetown	W 74–60	19–4 (7–2)	KFC Yum! Center (10,495); Louisville, KY
2/9/2013; 2:00 pm	No. 11	Pittsburgh	W 78–45	20–4 (8–2)	KFC Yum! Center (10,733); Louisville, KY
2/11/2013; 9:00 pm		at Notre Dame	L 64–93	20–5 (8–3)	Purcell Pavilion (8,368); South Bend, IN
2/17/2013; 1:30 pm		DePaul	W 81–55	21–5 (9–3)	KFC Yum! Center (10,906); Louisville, KY
2/20/2013; 7:00 pm		South Florida	L 62–73	21–6 (9–4)	KFC Yum! Center (8,201); Louisville, KY
2/24/2013; 2:00 pm		at Villanova	W 55–49	22–6 (10–4)	The Pavilion (1,239); Philadelphia, PA
2/27/2013; 7:00 pm		Seton Hall	W 72–62	23–6 (11–4)	KFC Yum! Center (9,232); Louisville, KY
3/4/2013; 9:00 pm		at Syracuse	L 57–68	23–7 (11–5)	Carrier Dome (441); Syracuse, NY
Big East Women's Tournament
3/10/2013*; 12:00 pm		vs. St. John's	W 62–55	24–7	XL Center; Hartford, CT
3/11/2013*; 6:00 pm	No. 16	vs. No. 2 Notre Dame; Semifinals	L 59–83	24–8	XL Center; Hartford, CT
NCAA Women's Tournament
3/24/2013*; 2:40 pm	(5 OKC) No. 16	(12 OKC) Middle Tennessee; First round	W 74–49	25–8	KFC Yum! Center (5,977); Louisville, KY
3/26/2013*; 7:00 pm	(5 OKC) No. 16	(4 OKC) Purdue; Second round	W 76–63	26–8	KFC Yum! Center (9,236); Louisville, KY
3/31/2013*; 7:00 pm, ESPN2	(5 OKC) No. 16	vs. (1 OKC) No. 1 Baylor; Regional Semifinal – Sweet Sixteen	W 82–81	27–8	Chesapeake Energy Arena (9,162); Oklahoma City, OK
4/2/2013*; 9:00 pm	(5 OKC) No. 16	vs. (2 OKC) Tennessee; Regional Final – Elite Eight	W 86–78	28–8	Chesapeake Energy Arena (6,147); Oklahoma City, OK
4/7/2013*; 6:30 pm	(5 OKC) No. 16	vs. (2 SPK) No. 6 California; National Semifinal – Final Four	W 64–57	29–8	New Orleans Arena; New Orleans, LA
4/9/2013*; 8:30 pm, ESPN	(5 OKC) No. 16	vs. (1 BGP) No. 3 Connecticut; National Championship	L 60–93	29–9	New Orleans Arena (17,545); New Orleans, LA
*Non-conference game. ^{#}Rankings from AP Poll. (#) Tournament seedings in parentheses. OKC=Oklahoma City. All times are in Eastern.
