= California Golden Bears women's basketball =

College women's basketball team representing the University of California, Berkeley

2026–27 California Golden Bears women's basketball team
- University: University of California, Berkeley
- Head coach: Charmin Smith (8th season)
- Location: Berkeley, California
- Arena: Haas Pavilion (capacity: 11,877)
- Conference: ACC
- Nickname: Golden Bears
- Colors: Blue and gold
- Student section: The Bench

NCAA Division I tournament Final Four
- 2013
Other NCAA Division I tournament results
Elite Eight	2013
Sweet Sixteen	2009, 2013
Appearances	1990, 1992, 1993, 2006, 2007, 2008, 2009, 2012, 2013, 2014, 2015, 2017, 2018, 2019, 2025

AIAW tournament quarterfinals
- 1982
Other AIAW tournament results
Appearances	1982

Conference regular-season champions
- 1981, 1982, 2013

Uniforms
Home	Away	Alternate

The California Golden Bears women's basketball team is the women's college basketball team at the University of California, Berkeley. As of the 2026 edition, the program has been to the NCAA tournament 15 times, and they have won three conference championships. Their current head coach is Charmin Smith, who was hired on June 21, 2019.

The team plays its home games at Haas Pavilion, which was built on top of the old Harmon Gymnasium using money donated in part by the owners of Levi-Strauss. The arena was originally known as Men's Gymnasium and then later Harmon Gymnasium until the late 1990s when it went through massive renovations which displaced the team for two seasons.

== History ==
=== Early history ===
The first intercollegiate women's basketball game was contested between intramural teams from California and Stanford in 1896, and intramural competition at California continued in following decades. However, it was not until 1973–74, following the enaction of Title IX, that California began playing officially organized women's basketball. Deborah Gebhardt served as the Golden Bears' inaugural coach.

After having four coaches in its first six seasons, the program entered a period of stability in 1979 with the arrival of Gooch Foster, who led the team to eight consecutive winning seasons to begin her tenure. Under Foster, California won consecutive conference titles in 1980–81 and 1981–82, and earned one AIAW and three NCAA tournament berths. Foster retired in the spring of 1996, after 17 seasons at the helm.

Center Colleen Galloway (1978–81) was the program's most notable player in its early days. She stood as the California women's all-time rebounding leader and the school's all-time scoring leader (men or women) until 2019. Galloway's number 13 was retired at the end of her collegiate career in 1981, the first Cal men's or women's player and to this day the only woman in program history to be so honored.

=== Joanne Boyle era (2005–2011) ===
Following 12 consecutive losing seasons from 1993–94 to 2004–05, California began a resurgence under former Richmond head coach Joanne Boyle. Boyle's first season ended in the Golden Bears' first NCAA Tournament appearance in fourteen years.

In 2006–07, California snapped Stanford's 50-game Pac-10 winning streak at Maples Pavilion en route to their first 20-win season since 1992 and a second consecutive NCAA tournament berth. The Golden Bears were ranked No. 25 in the final USA Today–ESPN women's basketball poll, and Joanne Boyle and Devannei Hampton received Pac-10 Coach and Player of the Year honors, respectively.

In 2007–08, California tied the 1983–84 Bears for the most wins in school history (24–4). The Bears were ranked as high as 8th in the national polls and set a then-Pac-10 women's basketball attendance record, with 10,525 witnessing Cal's 60–58 loss to Stanford at Haas Pavilion. The team won their first NCAA tournament game in a quarter-century before falling in the second round to George Washington.

The Golden Bears continued their uphill climb in 2008–09, with a team led by seniors Ashley Walker and Devanei Hampton. After beginning the season strongly and winning the Paradise Jam tournament in Saint Thomas, California carried their momentum into conference play. They reeled off 11 straight wins to open Pac-10 play—including their first home win over rival Stanford in 20 years—before slightly faltering down the stretch and finishing with a 15–3 conference record, tied for second. Despite a heartbreaking early exit from the Pac-10 Tournament at the hands of USC, the Bears went on a successful tournament run en route to their first ever Sweet 16 appearance. They led in the opening minutes against undefeated UConn Huskies but ultimately fell to the eventual national champions.

In 2009–10 the Bears brought in a top 10 recruiting class to make up for the losses of Walker and Hampton. The young Bears (the starting lineup during conference play featured four freshmen along with star senior Alexis Gray-Lawson) had an up and down year, going 6–5 in non-conference play including a home loss to nearby San Jose State. After an 0–3 conference start that left them two games under .500, the Bears started to find their form, going 12–5 the rest of the way including the Pac-10 tournament. However, the second half success was not enough for an NCAA tournament bid and Cal wound up settling for the WNIT. Although Alexis Gray-Lawson had to sit out the NIT opener because of an injury suffered in the Pac-10 tournament, the Bears edged UC Davis in overtime. Gray-Lawson returned for round 2, and the Bears romped through the remaining games against Utah, Oregon, BYU, Illinois State and finally Miami (FL) in the first ever championship game held at Haas Pavilion to win the tournament. Gray-Lawson ended her career as the all-time Cal leader in three points made and games played.

Boyle's final season in charge in Berkeley was 2010–11, which ended with a second-round loss in the WNIT to Colorado.

=== Lindsay Gottlieb era (2011–2019) ===
Following Boyle's departure for Virginia, California hired UC Santa Barbara's Lindsay Gottlieb to be the ninth coach in Golden Bears history. Keeping up where Boyle's teams left off, the 2011–12 Golden Bears returned to the NCAA tournament for the first time in three years, losing in the second round to eventual runners-up Notre Dame.

The 2012–2013 season started with high expectations, with almost the entire team returning from the season before, including star guard Layshia Clarendon. The Golden Bears were ranked #13 in the AP pre-season poll, their highest ranking since 2009. The team lived up to the expectations, finishing the regular season 28–2 and being ranked as high as No. 5. California's 17–1 Pac-12 record earned them their first share of a regular-season conference title since 1982. Despite a semifinal exit in the Pac-12 Tournament, the Golden Bears earned a second seed in the NCAA tournament. Following an overtime win over Georgia in the Elite Eight, California advanced to their first ever Final Four, where they lost to Louisville. The following summer, Layshia Clarendon was drafted ninth overall in the 2013 WNBA draft by the Indiana Fever.

Gottlieb continued to coach the Golden Bears through the 2018–19 season, leading players including top-10 WNBA picks Clarendon, Brittany Boyd, and Kristine Anigwe to a total of seven NCAA tournament appearances, the most of any head coach in program history. Under Gottlieb, Kristine Anigwe supplanted Colleen Galloway as California's all-time rebounding and scoring leader.

On June 12, 2019, Gottlieb was hired by the Cleveland Cavaliers as an assistant coach, becoming the first NCAA women's basketball coach to be hired by an NBA team. Gottlieb's 179 wins rank second all-time in team history.

=== Charmin Smith era (2019–present) ===
Gottlieb was succeeded as head coach by Charmin Smith, who had been on staff at California since 2007 and had served as Gottlieb's associate head coach since 2012.

== Year by year results ==
Record table
Season	Coach	Overall	Conference	Standing	Postseason
Deborah Gebhardt (NCIAC) (1973–1974)
1973–74	Deborah Gebhardt	5–5	2–3	—	—
Deborah Gebhardt:		5–5 (.500)	2—3 (.400)		
June Scopinich (1974–1975)
1974–75	June Scopinich	4–7	—	—	—
June Scopinich:		4–7 (.364)			
Barb Iten (NCIAC) (1975–1977)
1975–76	Barb Iten	6–12	3–7	—	—
1976–77	Barb Iten	15–7	9–3	—	—
Barb Iten:		21–19 (.525)	12—10 (.545)		
Marci Cantrell (NorCal) (1977–1979)
1977–78	Marci Cantrell	18–12	7–5	3rd	—
1978–79	Marci Cantrell	14–17	8–4	3rd	0—3 (WNIT)
Marci Cantrell:		32–29 (.525)	15—9 (.625)		
Gooch Foster (NorCal/NorPac/Pac-10) (1979–1996)
1979–80	Gooch Foster	17–13	7–5	3rd (NorCal)	—
1980–81	Gooch Foster	23–13	10–2	1st (NorCal)	1—2 (WNIT)
1981–82	Gooch Foster	23–10	10–2	1st (NorCal)	1—1 (AIAW Quarterfinals)
1982–83	Gooch Foster	17–12	12–2	2nd (NorPac)	—
1983–84	Gooch Foster	24–8	12–2	4th (NorPac)	1—1 (WNIT)
1984–85	Gooch Foster	15–12	7–5	5th (NorPac)	—
1985–86	Gooch Foster	16–12	7–5	4th (NorPac)	—
Pac-10/Pac-12
1986–87	Gooch Foster	21–10	10–8	5th (Pac-10)	2—1 (WNIT)
1987–88	Gooch Foster	15–15	6–12	T-6th (Pac-10)	—
1988–89	Gooch Foster	13–15	8–10	T-4th (Pac-10)	—
1989–90	Gooch Foster	17–12	9–9	T-4th (Pac-10)	0—1 (NCAA first round)
1990–91	Gooch Foster	14–14	7–11	7th (Pac-10)	—
1991–92	Gooch Foster	20–9	12–6	T-3rd (Pac-10)	0—1 (NCAA first round)
1992–93	Gooch Foster	19–10	10–8	T-4th (Pac-10)	1—1 (NCAA second round)
1993–94	Gooch Foster	8–20	2–16	T-9th (Pac-10)	—
1994–95	Gooch Foster	10–17	5–13	T-8th (Pac-10)	—
1995–96	Gooch Foster	7–20	3–15	10th (Pac-10)	—
Gooch Foster:		279–222 (.557)	137—131 (.511)		
Marianne Stanley (Pac-10) (1996–2000)
1996–97	Marianne Stanley	6–21	2–16	10th	—
1997–98	Marianne Stanley	6–22	2–16	T-9th	—
1998–99	Marianne Stanley	12–15	6–12	T-6th	—
1999–00	Marianne Stanley	11–17	6–12	8th	—
Marianne Stanley:		35–75 (.318)	16—56 (.222)		
Caren Horstmeyer (Pac-10) (2000–2005)
2000–01	Caren Horstmeyer	12–16	8–10	T-6th	—
2001–02	Caren Horstmeyer	7–21	2–16	9th	—
2002–03	Caren Horstmeyer	10–19	5–13	9th	—
2003–04	Caren Horstmeyer	12–17	4–14	9th	—
2004–05	Caren Horstmeyer	11–18	4–14	10th	—
Caren Horstmeyer:		52–91 (.364)	23—67 (.256)		
Joanne Boyle (Pac-10) (2005–2011)
2005–06	Joanne Boyle	18–12	10–8	6th	0—1 (NCAA first round)
2006–07	Joanne Boyle	23–9	12–6	3rd	0—1 (NCAA first round)
2007–08	Joanne Boyle	27–7	15–3	2nd	1—1 (NCAA second round)
2008–09	Joanne Boyle	27–7	15–3	T-2nd	2–1 (NCAA Sweet Sixteen)
2009–10	Joanne Boyle	24–13	11–7	4th	6—0 (WNIT champions)
2010–11	Joanne Boyle	18–16	7–11	6th	1–1 (WNIT Second Round)
Joanne Boyle:		137–64 (.681)	70—38 (.648)		
Lindsay Gottlieb (Pac-12) (2011–2019)
2011–12	Lindsay Gottlieb	25–10	15–6	2nd	1–1 (NCAA second round)
2012–13	Lindsay Gottlieb	32–4	17–1	T-1st	6–2 (NCAA final Four)
2013–14	Lindsay Gottlieb	22–10	13–5	2nd	1—1 (NCAA second round)
2014–15	Lindsay Gottlieb	24–10	13–5	T-3rd	1—1 (NCAA second round)
2015–16	Lindsay Gottlieb	15–17	4–14	10th	—
2016–17	Lindsay Gottlieb	20–14	6–12	T-7th	1—1 (NCAA second round)
2017–18	Lindsay Gottlieb	21–11	11–7	5th	0—1 (NCAA first round)
2018–19	Lindsay Gottlieb	20–13	9–9	T-6th	1—1 (NCAA second round)
Lindsay Gottlieb:		179–89 (.668)	88–59 (.599)		
Charmin Smith (Pac-12) (2019–2024)
2019–20	Charmin Smith	12–19	3–15	12th	—
2020–21	Charmin Smith	1–16	1–12	12th	—
2021–22	Charmin Smith	11–13	2–10	12th	—
2022–23	Charmin Smith	13–17	4–14	T-10th	—
2023–24	Charmin Smith	17–13	7–11	T-8th	—
Atlantic Coast Conference
Charmin Smith (ACC) (2024–present)
2024–25	Charmin Smith	25–9	12–6	7th	0—1 (NCAA First Round)
2025–26	Charmin Smith	21–15	9–9	10th	2–1 WBIT Quarterfinals
Charmin Smith:		102–104 (.495)	38–77 (.330)		
Total:		844–703 (.546)			
National champion Postseason invitational champion Conference regular season champion Conference regular season and conference tournament champion Division regular season champion Division regular season and conference tournament champion Conference tournament champion

Source: 2011-12 Golden Bears Record Book and California Season Statistics

== Postseason results ==
=== NCAA Division I ===
California has reached the NCAA Division I women's basketball tournament fifteen times. They have a record of 13−15.

Year	Seed	Round	Opponent	Result
1990	#11	First Round	#6 Long Beach State	L 84−87
1992	#5	First Round	#12 Santa Clara	L 71−73
1993	#9	First Round; Second Round	#8 Kansas #1 Vanderbilt	W 62−47; L 63–82
2006	#10	First Round	#7 St. John's	L 68−78
2007	#8	First Round	#9 Notre Dame	L 59−62
2008	#3	First Round; Second Round	#14 San Diego #6 George Washington	W 77−60; L 53–55
2009	#4	First Round; Second Round; Sweet Sixteen	#13 Fresno State #5 Virginia #1 Connecticut	W 70−47; W 99–73; L 53–77
2012	#8	First Round; Second Round	#9 Iowa #1 Notre Dame	W 84−74; L 62–73
2013	#2	First Round; Second Round; Sweet Sixteen; Elite Eight; Final Four	#15 Fresno State #10 South Florida #6 LSU #4 Georgia #5 Louisville	W 90−76; W 82–78 (OT); W 73–63; W 65−62 (OT); L 57–64
2014	#7	First Round; Second Round	#10 Fordham #2 Baylor	W 64−63; L 56–75
2015	#4	First Round; Second Round	#13 Wichita State #5 Texas	W 78−66; L 70–73
2017	#9	First Round; Second Round	#8 LSU #1 Baylor	W 55−52; L 46–86
2018	#7	First Round	#10 Virginia	L 62−68
2019	#8	First Round; Second Round	#9 North Carolina #1 Baylor	W 92−72; L 63–102
2025	#8	First Round	#9 Mississippi State	L 46−59

=== AIAW Division I ===
The Golden Bears made one appearance in the AIAW National Division I basketball tournament, with a combined record of 1–1.

Year	Round	Opponent	Result
1982	First Round; Quarterfinals	Arkansas; Wayland Baptist	W, 66–62; L, 70–85

=== WBIT ===
The Golden Bears have made two appearances in the Women's Basketball Invitation Tournament, with a combined record of 3-2.

Year	Round	Opponent	Result
2024	First Round; Second Round	Hawai'i; Saint Joseph's	W, 65-60; L, 61–63
2026	First Round; Second Round; Quarterfinals	Santa Clara; Kansas State; Columbia	W, 72–68; W, 83–75; L 68–74

== Retired numbers ==
California Golden Bears retired numbers
No.	Player	Position	Career	Year of Retirement
13	Colleen Galloway	C	1978–81	1981

== Roster ==
2026–27 California Golden Bears women's basketball team
Players
Coaches

Pos.	#	Name	Height	Year	Previous school	Hometown
G	0	Shannon Dowell	5 ft 10 in (1.78 m)	Sr	O'Fallon Township; Missouri	O'Fallon, IL
G	1	Mjracle Sheppard	5 ft 10 in (1.78 m)	Sr	Montverde Academy; LSU	Kent, WA
F	2	Anna Lagonikaki	6 ft 3 in (1.91 m)	Fr		Crete, Greece
F	3	Taylor Barnes	6 ft 0 in (1.83 m)	So	South Grand Prairie	Grand Prairie, TX
F	7	Naya Ojukwu	6 ft 1 in (1.85 m)	Jr	Mountain View; Morgan State	Meridian, ID
F	8	Zara Russell	6 ft 2 in (1.88 m)	Fr		Canberra, Australia
G	10	Lulu Twidale	5 ft 10 in (1.78 m)	Sr	Siena Catholic College	Sunshine Coast, Australia
G	11	Carly Amborn	6 ft 2 in (1.88 m)	So	San Domenico School; Stanford	Larkspur, CA
C	12	Albina Syla	6 ft 5 in (1.96 m)	Jr	Mäkelänrinne lukio Rhode Island	Vantaa, Finland
F	14	Jovana Jevtovic	6 ft 4 in (1.93 m)	Fr		Ivanjica, Serbia
G	21	Gisella Maul	5 ft 11 in (1.8 m)	Sr	Cedar Park; Texas	Cedar Park, TX
G	22	Ruby Perkins	5 ft 8 in (1.73 m)	Fr		East Killara, Australia
G	23	Anastasia Drosouni	5 ft 11 in (1.8 m)	Sr	Expaideftiria Fryganiotis	Thessaloniki, Greece
G	42	Sofia Bowes	5 ft 10 in (1.78 m)	Jr	San Ramon	San Ramon, CA

Head coach

- Charmin Smith (Stanford)

Assistant coach(es)

- Heidi Heintz (UC Davis)
- Travon Bryant (Missouri)
- Jenny Huth (Colorado)
- Eliza Pierre (California)

Legend

- (C) Team captain
- (S) Suspended
- (I) Ineligible
- (W) Walk-on
- Injured
- Current redshirt

Roster
Last update: August 9, 2026
