= 2012–13 Pittsburgh Panthers women's basketball team =

Intercollegiate basketball season

2012–13 Pittsburgh Panthers women's basketball
- Conference: Big East Conference (1979–2013)
- Record: 9–21 (0–16 Big East)
- Head coach: Agnus Berenato
- Assistant coaches: Patty Coyle; Khadija Head; Mallorie Winn
- Home arena: Petersen Events Center

2012–13 Big East Conference women's basketball standings
	Conf.				Overall
Team	W		L	PCT	W		L	PCT
No. 2 Notre Dame†	16	–	0	1.000	35	–	2	.946
No. 3 Connecticut	14	–	2	.875	35	–	4	.897
No. 16 Louisville	11	–	5	.688	29	–	9	.763
St. John's	11	–	5	.688	18	–	13	.581
South Florida	9	–	7	.563	22	–	11	.667
Villanova	9	–	7	.563	21	–	11	.656
DePaul	9	–	7	.563	21	–	12	.636
Rutgers	7	–	9	.438	16	–	14	.533
Marquette	7	–	9	.438	16	–	16	.500
Georgetown	5	–	11	.313	15	–	16	.484
Seton Hall	5	–	11	.313	11	–	20	.355
Cincinnati	4	–	12	.250	12	–	18	.400
Providence	2	–	14	.125	7	–	23	.233
Pittsburgh	0	–	16	.000	9	–	21	.300
† 2013 Big East Basketball Tournament winner As of April 9, 2013; Rankings from AP poll

The 2012–13 Pittsburgh Panthers women's basketball team represented the University of Pittsburgh in the 2012–13 NCAA Division I women's basketball season. The Panthers were coached by Agnus Berenato in their final year as a member of the Big East Conference. They played their home games at the Petersen Events Center in Pittsburgh, Pennsylvania, except for one game at Fitzgerald Field House.

== Season ==
The Panthers went 0-16 in Big East Conference play for the second year in a row, prompting the replacement of head coach Agnus Berenato with Suzie McConnell-Serio on April 12, 2013.

== Roster ==
2012–13 Pittsburgh Panthers women's basketball team
Players
Coaches

Pos.	#	Name	Height	Year	Previous school	Hometown
G/F	0	Asia Logan	6 ft 0 in (1.83 m)	Jr	Digital Harbor	Baltimore, MD
G	1	Loliya Briggs	5 ft 11 in (1.8 m)	RS Fr	Potter's House Christian Academy	Gainesville, FL
G	3	Brianna Kiesel	5 ft 7 in (1.7 m)	So	Thomas R. Proctor	Utica, NY
G	12	Abby Dowd	5 ft 9 in (1.75 m)	RS Jr	Tippecanoe/Buffalo	Tipp City, OH
G	13	Marquel Davis	5 ft 9 in (1.75 m)	Jr	Stafford	Fredericksburg, VA
F	22	Krista Pettepier	6 ft 3 in (1.91 m)	Fr	Ankeny	Ankeny, IA
G	23	Ashlee Anderson	5 ft 9 in (1.75 m)	RS Jr	Whitney M. Young Magnet	Chicago, IL
G	24	Brianna Brizzi	5 ft 6 in (1.68 m)	So	Fauquier	Warrenton, VA
G	25	Brittany Gordon	5 ft 8 in (1.73 m)	Fr	South Charleston	South Charleston, WV
G	31	Bridget Higgins	5 ft 8 in (1.73 m)	Fr	Mount Saint Joseph Academy	Lafayette Hill, Pa.
F/C	34	Chyna Golden	6 ft 2 in (1.88 m)	So	Neptune	Neptune, N.J.
C	44	Marvadene Anderson (redshirt)	6 ft 11 in (2.11 m)	Fr	Rutgers Prep (NJ)	Clarendon, Jamaica
F/C	51	Cora McManus	6 ft 0 in (1.83 m)	So	Garfield	Seattle, Wash.

Head coach

Agnus Berenato

Assistant coach(es)

Patty Coyle
Khadija Head
Mallorie Winn

Legend

- (C) Team captain
- (S) Suspended
- (I) Ineligible
- (W) Walk-on
- Injured
- Current redshirt

Roster
Last update: August 17, 2013

Six-foot, 11-inch center Marvadene "Bubbles" Anderson redshirted during the 2012-13 season.

== Schedule ==
Pitt's 2012-13 women's basketball schedule.

Date time, TV	Rank^{#}	Opponent^{#}	Result	Record	Site (attendance) city, state
Exhibition
Sat, Nov. 3*; 12:00 pm		Lock Haven	W 94–61		Petersen Events Center (1,315); Pittsburgh, PA
Regular season
Fri, Nov. 9*; 11:00 am, Pitt Panthers All-Access		Youngstown State; School Day	L 50–64	0–1	Petersen Events Center (4,036); Pittsburgh, PA
Sun, Nov. 11*; 1:00 pm, Pitt Panthers All-Access		William & Mary	W 76–74	1–1	Petersen Events Center (1,209); Pittsburgh, PA
Tue, Nov. 13*; 1:00 pm, Pitt Panthers All-Access		Siena	W 75–50	2–1	Fitzgerald Field House (1,191); Pittsburgh, PA
Tue, Nov. 20*; 7:00 pm, Pitt Panthers All-Access		Wagner	W 65–39	3–1	Petersen Events Center (1,022); Pittsburgh, PA
Sat, Nov. 24*; 1:00 pm, Pitt Panthers All-Access		Brown	W 58–57	4–1	Petersen Events Center (1,284); Pittsburgh, PA
Mon, Nov. 26*; 7:00 pm, Pitt Panthers All-Access		Longwood	W 86–60	5–1	Petersen Events Center (1,012); Pittsburgh, PA
Sat, Dec. 1*; 2:00 pm, Lafayette All-Access		at Lafayette	L 65–68	5–2	Kirby Sports Center (759); Easton, PA
Wed, Dec. 5*; 7:00 pm, Pitt Panthers All-Access		Loyola (MD)	W 57–47	6–2	Petersen Events Center (1,076); Pittsburgh, PA
Sat, Dec. 8*; 2:00 pm, Duquesne All-Access		at Duquesne; City Game	L 61–70	6–3	A. J. Palumbo Center (1,471); Pittsburgh, PA
Sun, Dec. 16*; 1:00 pm, Pitt Panthers All-Access		Rider; Hometown vs. Hunger	L 48–65	6–4	Petersen Events Center (1,439); Pittsburgh, PA
Thu, Dec. 20*; 7:00 pm, Pitt Panthers All-Access		Mount St. Mary's	W 67–49	7–4	Petersen Events Center (1,007); Pittsburgh, PA
Sat, Dec. 29*; 2:00 pm, Buffalo webstream		at Buffalo	W 91–77	8–4	Alumni Arena (1,123); Amherst, NY
Wed, Jan. 2*; 3:00 pm, Old Dominion All-Access		at Old Dominion	W 55–54	9–4	Ted Constant Convocation Center (1,922); Norfolk, VA
Sat, Jan. 5; 2:00 p.m., Seton Hall All-Access		at Seton Hall	L 56–69	9–5 (0–1)	Walsh Gymnasium (459); South Orange, NJ
Sat, Jan. 12; 6:00 p.m., Big East TV Game of the Week; ESPN3 / SNY / Comcast Network		Villanova	L 52–68	9–6 (0–2)	Petersen Events Center (1,470); Pittsburgh, PA
Wed, Jan. 16; 7:00 p.m., ESPN3		at St. John's	L 32–61	9–7 (0–3)	Carnesecca Arena (426); Queens, New York, NY
Sat, Jan. 19; 3:00 p.m., Comcast Network (PPTV)		Marquette; Girl Scout Day	L 65–74	9–8 (0–4)	Petersen Events Center (1,967); Pittsburgh, PA
Wed, Jan. 23; 7:00 p.m., Comcast Network (PPTV)		No. 2 Notre Dame	L 47–73	9–9 (0–5)	Petersen Events Center (3,158); Pittsburgh, PA
Sat, Jan. 26; 4:00 p.m., Georgetown All-Access		at Georgetown	L 57–69	9–10 (0–6)	McDonough Gymnasium (1,695); Washington, D.C.
Tue, Jan. 29; 8:00 pm, WCIU-DT2 / Comcast Network (PPTV)		at DePaul	L 55–57	9–11 (0–7)	McGrath-Phillips Arena (2,214); Chicago, IL
Sun, Feb. 3; 1:00 p.m., Comcast Network (PPTV)		South Florida	L 60–78	9–12 (0–8)	Petersen Events Center (1,014); Pittsburgh, PA
Wed, Feb. 6; 7:00 p.m., Comcast Network (PPTV)		Providence	L 83–85 ^{2OT}	9–13 (0–9)	Petersen Events Center (1,360); Pittsburgh, PA
Sat, Feb. 9; 2:05 p.m., Cards TV webstream		at No. 11 Louisville	L 45–78	9–14 (0–10)	KFC Yum! Center (10,733); Louisville, KY
Sat, Feb. 16; 2:00 p.m., ESPN3		at No. 23 Syracuse	L 39–80	9–15 (0–11)	Carrier Dome (1,355); Syracuse, NY
Web, Feb. 20; 7:00 p.m., Comcast Network (PPTV)		Cincinnati	L 50–59	9–16 (0–12)	Petersen Events Center (1,013); Pittsburgh, PA
Sat, Feb. 23; 1:00 p.m., Comcast Network (PPTV)		Georgetown; Pink The Petersen	L 70–72	9–17 (0–13)	Petersen Events Center (3,090); Pittsburgh, PA
Tue, Feb. 26; 7:00 p.m., SNY		at No. 3 Connecticut	L 36–76	9–18 (0–14)	XL Center (9,428); Hartford, CT
Sat, Mar. 2; 1:00 p.m., Comcast Network (PPTV)		DePaul	L 73–81	9–19 (0–15)	Petersen Events Center (1,215); Pittsburgh, PA
Mon, Mar. 4; 7:30 p.m., R Vision webstream		at Rutgers	L 44–65	9–20 (0–16)	Louis Brown Athletic Center (1,558); Piscataway, NJ
Postseason Big East Women's Basketball Championship
Fri, Mar. 8; 6:00 p.m., BIGEAST.tv webstream		vs. Marquette; Big East First Round	L 43–66	9–21	XL Center (n/a); Hartford, CT
*Non-conference game. ^{#}Rankings from Division I AP Poll unless otherwise noted. (#) during postseason tournaments is seed with region, if applicable. (#) Tournament seedings in parentheses. All times are in Eastern Standard Time.

Note: All-Access is the CBS Sports Network's suite of subscription-based live video web streaming of the respective schools selected sports events.
