= Kelly Faris =

American basketball player (born 1991)

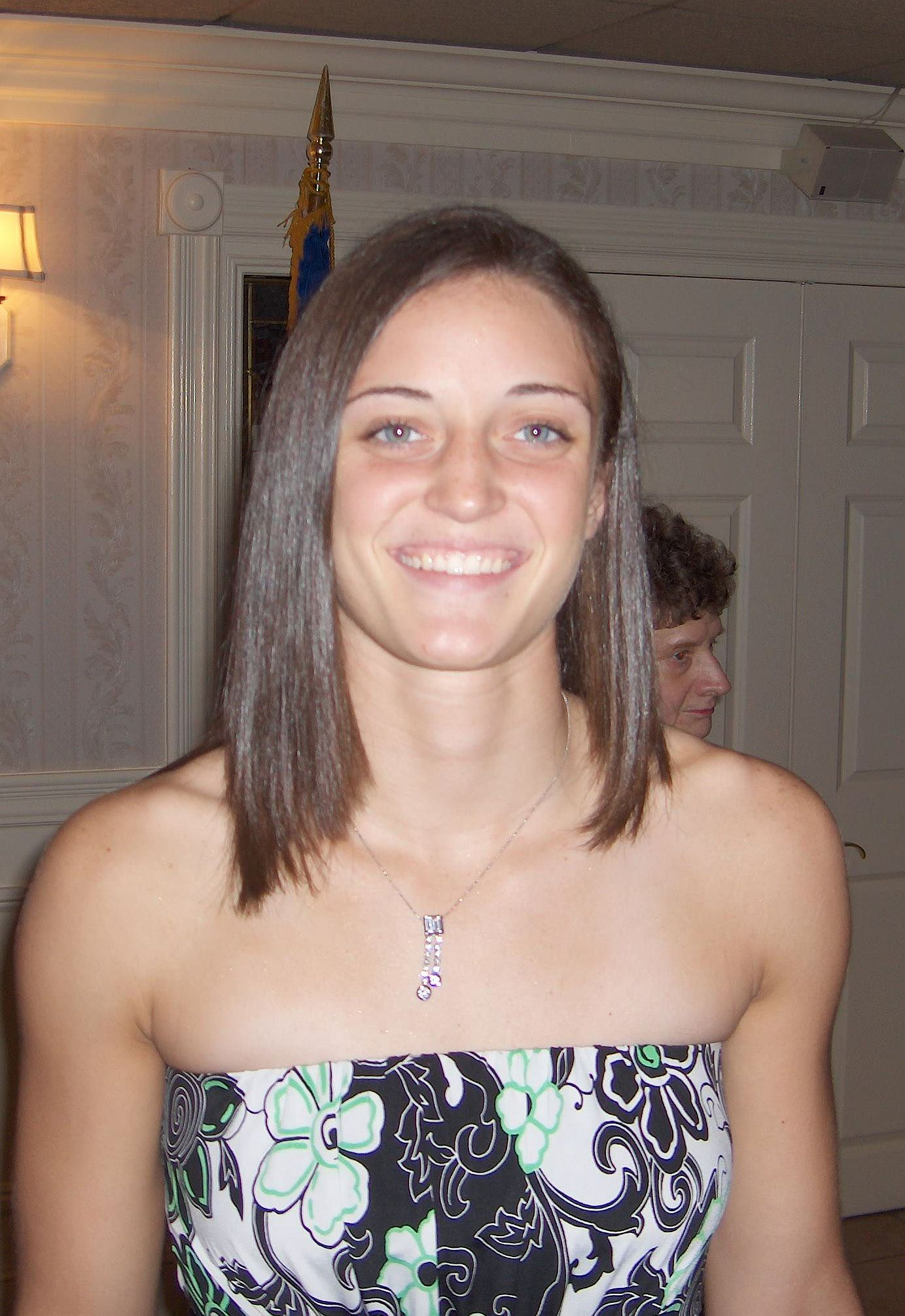
- Faris in 2009

Chicago Sky
- Position: Assistant coach
- League: WNBA

Personal information
- Born: January 16, 1991 (age 35) Plainfield, Indiana, U.S.
- Listed height: 5 ft 11 in (1.80 m)
- Listed weight: 155 lb (70 kg)

Career information
- High school: Heritage Christian (Indianapolis, Indiana)
- College: UConn (2009–2013)
- WNBA draft: 2013: 1st round, 11th overall pick
- Drafted by: Connecticut Sun
- Playing career: 2013–2019

Career history

Playing
- 2013–2016: Connecticut Sun
- 2013–2014: UNIQA Euroleasing Sopron
- 2014: Adelaide Lightning
- 2016: Flying Foxes Post SV Wien
- 2017: Bnot Hertzeliya
- 2018–2019: Breiðablik

Coaching
- 2026–present: Chicago Sky

Career highlights
- Austrian Basketball League champion (2016); Austrian-Slovak Basketball League champion (2016); Austrian Cup (2016); Austrian Cup Final Four MVP (2016); 2× NCAA champion (2010, 2013); Big East Most Improved Player of the Year (2013); Big East Defensive Player of the Year (2013); Big East All-Freshman team (2010); McDonald's All-American (2009)
- Stats at WNBA.com
- Stats at Basketball Reference
Medals
Women's basketball
FIBA Under-19 World Cup
Gold medal – first place	2009 Thailand	Team
FIBA Under-18 Americas Championship
Gold medal – first place	2008 Argentina	Team

Kelly Elizabeth Faris (born January 16, 1991) is an American former basketball player who currently serves as an assistant coach for the Chicago Sky of the Women's National Basketball Association (WNBA). Faris played shooting guard for the Connecticut women's basketball team, and won two national championships in 2010 and 2013. She was on a post-season championship team for five consecutive seasons, including four consecutive high school state championships and two NCAA championship. She was drafted 11th overall by the Connecticut Sun in the 2013 WNBA draft.

== Early life ==
Faris is daughter of Bob and Connie Faris. Faris has two older sisters Kristi and Kimmi and one older brother Patrick (Fizzle). She played on the Indiana's Finest AAU team which won the National Championship in 2003 for the 11U division (players age 11 and under).

== High school career ==
Faris played basketball at Heritage Christian high school in Indianapolis, Indiana, where the Eagles had an amazing combined record of 108–8. Faris helped lead the high school to four consecutive IHSAA Class 2A state championships. This accomplishment earned the team a congratulatory resolution from the General Assembly of the State of Indiana. The team was 12–12 in the season before Faris arrived at Heritage Christian. During her junior year, Faris achieved a quadruple-double vs Harding High School Hawks on November 24, 2007, Faris scored 14 points, had 10 rebounds, 10 assists and 10 steals and was named MVP of the 2008 state tournament. Faris finished her career as Heritage's High School's all-time leader in rebounds (1,015), assists (526), blocks (108) and steals (493) ranks second among the school's all-time scoring leaders (1,426 points). Faris was named to the all-state first team in 2007, 2008, and 2009.

In addition to basketball, she also participated in volleyball and track, lettering in both sports, and earning all-state honors in volleyball for both 2007 and 2008. She also won national honors in 2007, being named to the 2007 AAU Junior National Volleyball Championships All-American team. She was also an excellent student, earning High Academic Honors as a senior, and being a member of National Honors Society. Faris was selected as a McDonald's All-American. She participated in the McDonald's All-Star game with four points, seven rebounds, three assists, three steals and two blocked shots while playing for the East Team in the 2009 game.

== College career ==
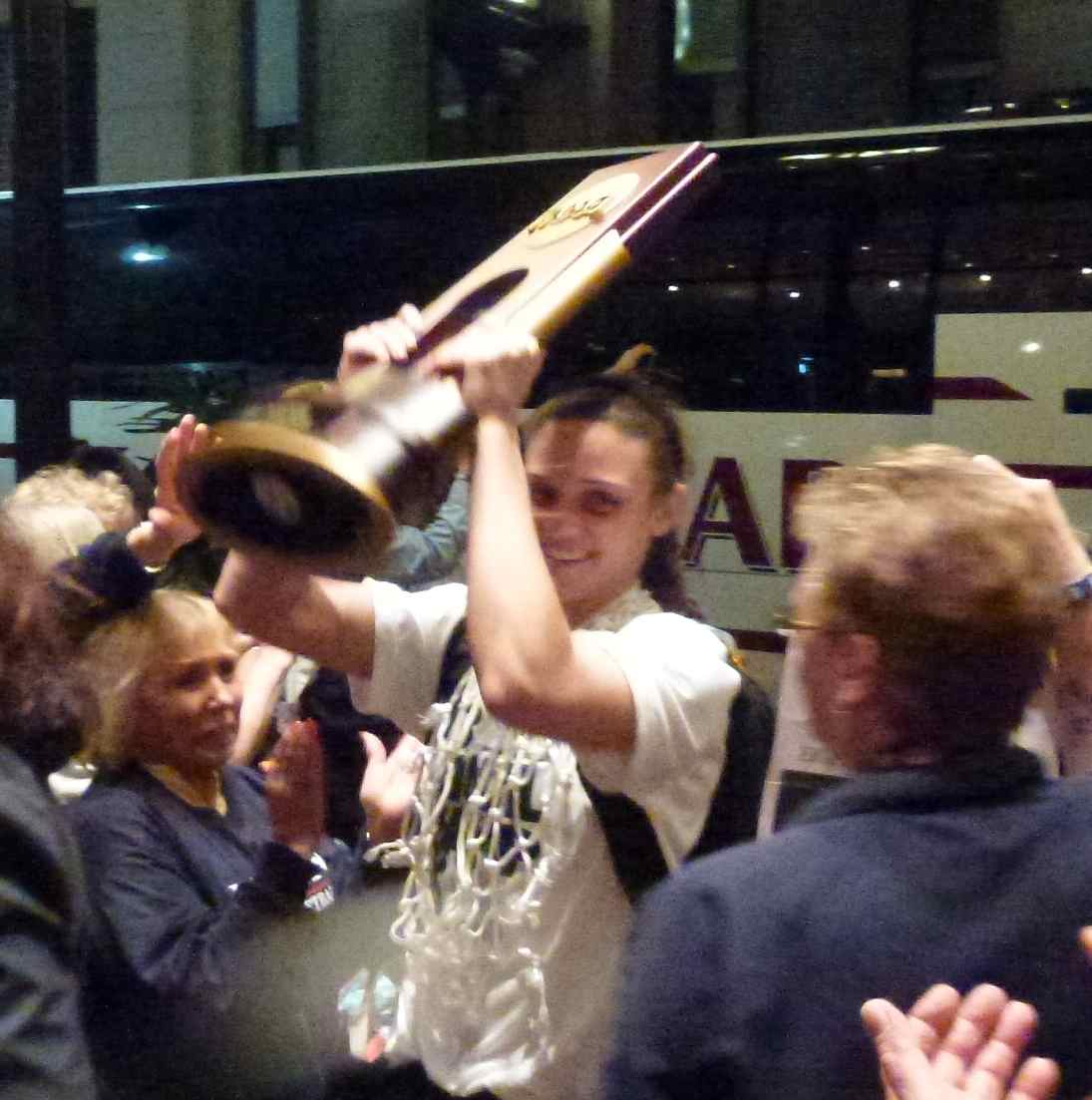
Kelly Faris with National Championship trophy, returning to the team hotel after winning the 2013 NCAA Women's Basketball National Championship

Faris wore number 34, a number worn by her siblings. Faris led UConn to a 143–11 record over her four-year career, which included four Final Four appearances and two National Championships. She is the second player in Connecticut basketball history to record more than 1,000 points, 750 rebounds, 500 assists and 250 steals; the other player to reach this milestone was Maya Moore. In her senior year, Faris was named the Big East Defensive player of the year, and shared honors for the Big East most improved player of the year. She finished her career ranking 40th in points (1,109), 6th in steals (294), and 11th in assists (525).

== College statistics ==
Legend
GP	Games played	GS	Games started	MPG	Minutes per game
FG%	Field goal percentage	3P%	3-point field goal percentage	FT%	Free throw percentage
RPG	Rebounds per game	APG	Assists per game	SPG	Steals per game
BPG	Blocks per game	PPG	Points per game	**Bold**	Career high

Year	Team	GP	Points	FG%	3P%	FT%	RPG	APG	SPG	BPG	PPG
2009–10	Connecticut	39	158	38.2	27.0	77.5	3.7	2.1	1.2	0.3	4.1
2010–11	Connecticut	38	296	42.5	30.9	75.6	6.7	3.7	1.8	**0.6**	7.8
2011–12	Connecticut	38	256	43.7	31.5	**78.8**	5.2	**4.3**	2.1	**0.6**	6.7
2012–13	Connecticut	39	**399**	**53.0**	**41.5**	75.0	**7.1**	3.0	**2.5**	0.5	**10.2**
Career	Connecticut	154	1109	44.4	32.7	76.7	5.7	3.3	1.9	0.5	7.2

== Professional career ==
Faris was selected 11th overall in the 2013 WNBA draft by the Connecticut Sun. She played for the Sun from 2013 to 2016, averaging 2.1 points and 1.6 rebounds in 112 games.

In September 2013, she signed with EuroLeague Women team UNIQA Euroleasing Sopron in Hungary.

Faris signed with Adelaide Lightning of the Women's National Basketball League for the 2014–15 season. She was released by the club in December that same year with the team in last place. For the season she averaged 3.8 points, 3.5 rebounds and 1.2 assists.

In January 2016, Faris signed with the Flying Foxes Post SV Wien of the Austrian Women's Basketball Bundesliga. She helped the Flying Foxes to both the national championship, the Austrian Cup, where she was named the Cup's Final Four MVP, and to the Austrian-Slovak Women Basketball League championship.

In February 2017, she signed with Bnot Hertzeliya of the Israeli Female Basketball Premier League where she averaged 13.9 points in five games.

In February 2018, Faris signed a training camp contract with the New York Liberty. In August 2018, Faris signed with Breiðablik of the Icelandic Úrvalsdeild kvenna. She left the team in January 2019. In 14 games in the Úrvalsdeild, Faris averaged 20.9 points, 12.1 rebounds and 3.6 assists per game.

On February 11, 2019, Faris signed a training camp contract with the New York Liberty for the second straight year. She was released by the Liberty on May 20, prior to the start of the season.

=== WNBA career statistics ===
Legend
GP	Games played	GS	Games started	MPG	Minutes per game	RPG	Rebounds per game
APG	Assists per game	SPG	Steals per game	BPG	Blocks per game	PPG	Points per game
TO	Turnovers per game	FG%	Field-goal percentage	3P%	3-point field-goal percentage	FT%	Free-throw percentage
**Bold**	Career best	°	League leader

==== Regular season ====
Year	Team	GP	GS	MPG	FG%	3P%	FT%	RPG	APG	SPG	BPG	TO	PPG
2013	Connecticut	24	3	14.1	36.7	28.0	77.8	**2.2**	0.7	0.3	**0.2**	0.6	2.1
2014	Connecticut	25	0	7.7	24.2	26.7	80.0	1.2	0.4	0.1	0.1	**0.3**	1.1
2015	Connecticut	**32**	**9**	**14.5**	38.1	**31.0**	77.8	1.7	**1.0**	0.4	0.1	0.5	**2.9**
2016	Connecticut	31	0	10.2	**39.6**	25.0	**93.3**	1.2	0.7	**0.7**	0.1	0.9	2.0
Career	4 years, 1 team	112	12	11.7	36.1	28.1	82.0	1.6	0.7	0.4	0.1	0.6	2.1

== National team career ==
Faris was selected to play in the USA Women's Youth Development Festival. Eligible players are female basketball players who are in their sophomore or junior in high school. The 2007 event took place at the US Olympic Training Center in Colorado Springs, CO.

Faris was a member of the USA Women's U18 team which won the gold medal at the FIBA Americas Championship in Buenos Aires, Argentina. The event was held in July 2008, when the USA team defeated host Argentina to win the championship. Faris helped the team win all five games, assisting on 17 baskets, only one fewer than the team high 18.

Faris continued on to the USA Women's U19 team which represented the USA in the 2009 U19 World's Championship, held in Bangkok, Thailand in July and August 2009. Although the USA team lost the opening game to Spain, they went on to win their next seven games to earn a rematch against Spain in the finals, and won the game 81–71 to earn the gold medal. Faris was the high scorer with 13 points in the game against Mali.

== Coaching career ==
On April 16, 2026, Faris was hired to serve as an assistant coach for the Chicago Sky of the Women's National Basketball Association.

== Awards and honors ==
- 2003—AAU Basketball National Championship 11U
- 2007—AAU Junior National Volleyball Championships All-American team.
- 2007—First Team, All-State (Indiana 2A)
- 2008—First Team, All-State (Indiana 2A)
- 2008—MVP State Tournament (Indiana 2A)
- 2009—First Team, All-State (Indiana 2A)
- 2009—McDonald's All-America
- 2009—Parade Magazine All-America first team
- 2009—USA Today All-USA second team honors
- 2013—Big East Defensive Player of the Year.
- 2013—Big East Most Improved Player of the Year.
- 2013—NCAA Final Four All-Tournament team.

== See also ==
- 2009–10 Connecticut Huskies women's basketball team
- List of Connecticut Huskies women's basketball players with 1000 points
