= 2013 NCAA Division I women's basketball tournament =

American college basketball tournament

- Season: 2012–13
- Teams: 64
- Finals site: New Orleans Arena, New Orleans, Louisiana
- Champions: Connecticut Huskies (8th title, 8th title game, 14th Final Four)
- Runner-up: Louisville Cardinals (2nd title game, 2nd Final Four)
- Semifinalists: California Golden Bears (1st Final Four); Notre Dame Fighting Irish (5th Final Four)
- Winning coach: Geno Auriemma (8th title)
- MOP: Breanna Stewart (Connecticut)

The 2013 NCAA Division I women's basketball tournament was played from March 23 through April 9, 2013. Tennessee continued its streak of making every NCAA women's basketball tournament at 32 consecutive appearances. Kansas made the regional semifinals for the second year in a row as a double-digit seed, UConn made it into the Final Four for the sixth consecutive year, the longest such streak, and Louisville became the first team seeded lower than fourth in a region to advance to the championship game. For the first time in tournament history, the same four teams were #1 seeds as in the previous year.

== Tournament procedure ==
Pending any changes to the format, a total of 64 teams will enter the 2019 tournament. 32 automatic bids shall be awarded to each program that wins their conference's tournament. The remaining 32 bids are "at-large", with selections extended by the NCAA Selection Committee. The tournament is split into four regional tournaments, and each regional has teams seeded from 1 to 16, with the committee ostensibly making every region as comparable to the others as possible. The top-seeded team in each region plays the #16 team, the #2 team plays the #15, etc. (meaning where the two seeds add up to 17, that team will be assigned to play another).

The Selection Committee will also seed the entire field from 1 to 64.

== Schedule and venues ==
The format is similar to the men's tournament, except that there are 64 teams; this in turn means there is no "First Four" round. Thirty-one automatic bids for conference champions and 33 at-large bids were available.

The subregionals were played from March 23 through March 26. Sites chosen to host first- and second-round games in 2013 include:

2013 NCAA subregionals

First round and Second Rounds (Subregionals)

- March 23 and 25
  - Coors Events Center, Boulder, Colorado, Host: University of Colorado
  - Comcast Center, College Park, Maryland, Host: University of Maryland
  - Reed Arena, College Station, Texas, Host: Texas A&M University
  - St. John Arena, Columbus, Ohio, Host: Ohio State University
  - Thompson-Boling Arena, Knoxville, Tennessee, Host: University of Tennessee
  - United Spirit Arena, Lubbock, Texas, Host: Texas Tech University
  - McCarthey Athletic Center, Spokane, Washington, Host: Gonzaga University
  - Gampel Pavilion, Storrs, Connecticut, Host: University of Connecticut
- March 24 and 26
  - Pete Maravich Assembly Center, Baton Rouge, Louisiana, Host: Louisiana State University
  - Cameron Indoor Stadium, Durham, North Carolina, Host: Duke University
  - Carver–Hawkeye Arena, Iowa City, Iowa, Host: The University of Iowa
  - KFC Yum! Center, Louisville, Kentucky, Host: University of Louisville
  - Bob Carpenter Center, Newark, Delaware, Host: University of Delaware
  - Carnesecca Arena, Queens, New York, Host: St. John's University
  - Maples Pavilion, Stanford, California, Host: Stanford University
  - Ferrell Center, Waco, Texas, Host: Baylor University

Regional semifinals and finals (Sweet Sixteen and Elite Eight)

The Regionals, named for the city rather than the region of geographic importance since 2005, held from March 30 to April 2, were at these sites:

2013 NCAA Regionals and Final Four
- March 30 and April 1
  - Spokane Regional Spokane Veterans Memorial Arena, Spokane, Washington, Host: Washington State University
  - Bridgeport Regional Webster Bank Arena at Harbor Yard, Bridgeport, Connecticut, Host: Metro Atlantic Athletic Conference and Fairfield University
- March 31 and April 2
  - Norfolk Regional Ted Constant Convocation Center, Norfolk, Virginia, Host: Old Dominion University
  - Oklahoma City Regional Chesapeake Energy Arena, Oklahoma City, Oklahoma, Host: Big 12 Conference

A regional had been scheduled at Sun National Bank Center in Trenton, New Jersey. However, the NCAA moved the regional to Connecticut because of a recently passed state law allowing single-game betting for professional and collegiate games. NCAA rules do not allow tournament events to be held in states that allow single-game betting.

National semifinals and championship (Final Four and championship)

- April 7 and 9
  - Smoothie King Center, New Orleans, Louisiana (Hosts: University of New Orleans, Tulane University, and Southland Conference/Sun Belt Conference)

This is the third time that New Orleans has been selected as a women's Final Four location (previously, in 1991 and 2004) and second time at the Smoothie King Center (previously named Kiefer Lakefront UNO Arena); the 1991 Final Four was contested at the University of New Orleans' Lakefront Arena.

== Tournament records ==
- Points in a Final Four game—Connecticut scored 93 points against Louisville in the Championship game, tied for the second most points scored in a Final Four game
- Winning margin—Connecticut defeated Louisville 93–60 in the Championship game; the margin of 33 points is the largest in Final Four history
- Three-pointers made—Connecticut hit 13 three-pointers in the Championship game, which is the most ever made in a Final Four game
- Assists—Connecticut recorded 24 assists in the Championship game against Louisville, the most ever recorded in a Final Four game since the NCAA began recording assists in 1985. (Broken by Connecticut in 2014)
- Blocked shots—Connecticut recorded 12 blocked shots in the Championship game against Louisville; the most ever recorded in a Final Four game
- Three-pointer percentage—Breanna Stewart hit seven of her eight three-point attempts in the final two games; the percentage of 87.5% is the highest recorded in the two Final Four games

== Qualified teams ==
=== Automatic qualifiers ===
The following teams were automatic qualifiers for the 2013 NCAA field by virtue of winning their conference's tournament (except for the Ivy League, whose regular-season champion received the automatic bid).

Conference	School	Last Appearance	# of Appearances
America East	Albany	2012	2
Atlantic 10	Saint Joseph's	2000	12
ACC	Duke	2012	20
Atlantic Sun	Stetson	2011	3
Big 12	Baylor	2012	12
Big East	Notre Dame	2012	20
Big Sky	Montana	2011	20
Big South	Liberty	2012	15
Big Ten	Purdue	2012	23
Big West	Cal Poly	Never	1
Colonial	Delaware	2012	4
C-USA	Tulsa	2006	2
Horizon	Green Bay	2012	14
Ivy League	Princeton	2012	4
MAAC	Marist	2012	9
MAC	Central Michigan	1984	3
MEAC	Hampton	2012	7
Missouri Valley	Wichita State	Never	1
Mountain West	Fresno State	2012	5
Northeast	Quinnipiac	Never	1
Ohio Valley	Tennessee–Martin	2012	3
Pac-12	Stanford	2012	27
Patriot	Navy	2012	3
SEC	Texas A&M	2012	10
Southern	Chattanooga	2010	11
Southland	Oral Roberts	2008	6
SWAC	Prairie View A&M	2012	5
Summit	South Dakota State	2012	5
Sun Belt	Middle Tennessee	2012	16
West Coast	Gonzaga	2012	6
WAC	Idaho	1985	2

=== Tournament seeds ===
Oklahoma City RegionalChesapeake Energy Arena, Oklahoma City, Oklahoma
Seed	School	Conference	Record	Berth type
1	Baylor	Big 12	32–1	Tournament Champion
2	Tennessee	SEC	24–7	At-Large
3	UCLA	Pac-12	25–7	At-Large
4	Purdue	Big Ten	24–8	Tournament Champion
5	Louisville	Big East	24–8	At-Large
6	Oklahoma	Big 12	22–10	At-Large
7	Syracuse	Big East	24–7	At-Large
8	Florida State	ACC	22–9	At-Large
9	Princeton	Ivy League	22–6	Reg. Season Champion
10	Creighton	Missouri Valley	24–7	At-Large
11	Central Michigan	Mid American	21–11	Tournament Champion
12	Middle Tennessee	Sun Belt	25–7	Tournament Champion
13	Liberty	Big South	27–6	Tournament Champion
14	Stetson	Atlantic Sun	24–8	Tournament Champion
15	Oral Roberts	Southland	18–12	Tournament Champion
16	Prairie View A&M	SWAC	17–14	Tournament Champion

Norfolk RegionalTed Constant Convocation Center, Norfolk, Virginia
Seed	School	Conference	Record	Berth Type
1	Notre Dame	Big East	31–1	Tournament Champion
2	Duke	ACC	30–2	Tournament Champion
3	Texas A&M	SEC	24–9	Tournament Champion
4	South Carolina	SEC	24–7	At-Large
5	Colorado	Pac-12	25–6	At-Large
6	Nebraska	Big Ten	23–8	At-Large
7	Oklahoma State	Big 12	21–10	At-Large
8	Miami (FL)	ACC	21–10	At-Large
9	Iowa	Big Ten	20–12	At-Large
10	DePaul	Big East	21–11	At-Large
11	Chattanooga	Southern	29–3	Tournament Champion
12	Kansas	Big 12	18–13	At-Large
13	South Dakota State	Summit	25–7	Tournament Champion
14	Wichita State	Missouri Valley	24–9	Tournament Champion
15	Hampton	MEAC	28–5	Tournament Champion
16	Tennessee-Martin	Ohio Valley	19–14	Tournament Champion

Spokane RegionalSpokane Veterans Memorial Arena, Spokane, Washington
Seed	School	Conference	Record	Berth Type
1	Stanford	Pac-12	31–2	Tournament Champion
2	California	Pac-12	28–3	At-Large
3	Penn State	Big Ten	25–5	At-Large
4	Georgia	SEC	25–6	At-Large
5	Iowa State	Big 12	23–8	At-Large
6	Louisiana State	SEC	20–11	At-Large
7	Texas Tech	Big 12	21–10	At-Large
8	Michigan	Big Ten	21–10	At-Large
9	Villanova	Big East	21–10	At-Large
10	South Florida	Big East	21–10	At-Large
11	Green Bay	Horizon	29–2	Tournament Champion
12	Gonzaga	WCC	27–5	Tournament Champion
13	Montana	Big Sky	24–7	Tournament Champion
14	Cal Poly	Big West	21–10	Tournament Champion
15	Fresno State	Mountain West	24–8	Tournament Champion
16	Tulsa	Conference USA	17–16	Tournament Champion

Bridgeport RegionalWebster Bank Arena at Harbor Yard, Bridgeport, Connecticut
Seed	School	Conference	Record	Berth Type
1	Connecticut	Big East	29–4	At-Large
2	Kentucky	SEC	27–5	At-Large
3	North Carolina	ACC	28–6	At-Large
4	Maryland	ACC	24–7	At-Large
5	Michigan State	Big Ten	24–8	At-Large
6	Delaware	Colonial	30–3	Tournament Champion
7	Dayton	Atlantic 10	27–2	At-Large
8	Vanderbilt	SEC	20–11	At-Large
9	Saint Joseph's	Atlantic 10	23–8	Tournament Champion
10	St. John's	Big East	18–12	At-Large
11	West Virginia	Big 12	17–13	At-Large
12	Marist	MAAC	26–6	Tournament Champion
13	Quinnipiac	Northeast	30–2	Tournament Champion
14	Albany	America East	27–3	Tournament Champion
15	Navy	Patriot	21–11	Tournament Champion
16	Idaho	WAC	17–15	Tournament Champion

Kentucky vs. Navy, Oklahoma State vs. Duke, and Notre Dame vs. Iowa aired on ESPNU. Purdue vs. Louisville aired on ESPNEWS. All other first and second round games aired on ESPN2

== Game summaries ==
=== Oklahoma City Regional ===
Almost all first-round games were won by the higher-seeded team except for Creighton, the 10 seed who upset Syracuse 61–56. The top seed, Baylor won easily, by 42 points over Prairie View A&M. The only other game within single digit margin was 6 seed Oklahoma beating Central Michigan by five points.

In the second round, three of the four games followed expectations, with the only upset being the 5 seed Louisville over 4 seed Purdue. In the third round, 2 seed Tennessee beat 6 seed Oklahoma as expected, but Louisville upset top seeded Baylor in a result some have called one of the greatest upsets in women's basketball history. Baylor won the national championship in 2012, going undefeated during the season, and had returned every starter. While they lost one game in the current regular season, point guard Odyssey Sims was injured early in that game. The team had not lost a game in two years when playing at full strength. Louisville, the third best team in the Big East, hit sixteen of 25 three-point attempts, and held Griner to 14 points, after she had averaged 33 points in the first two games.

== Bracket ==
* – Denotes overtime period

=== Oklahoma City Regional ===
First round
1	Baylor	82
16	Prairie View A&M	40
Waco, TX – Sun/Tues
8	Florida State	60
9	Princeton	44
5	Louisville	74
12	Middle Tennessee	49
Louisville, KY – Sun/Tues
4	Purdue	77
13	Liberty	43
6	Oklahoma	78
11	Central Michigan	73
Columbus, OH – Sat/Mon
3	UCLA	66
14	Stetson	49
7	Syracuse	56
10	Creighton	61
Knoxville, TN – Sat/Mon
2	Tennessee	83
15	Oral Roberts	62

Second Round
1	Baylor	85
8	Florida State	47
5	Louisville	76
4	Purdue	63
6	Oklahoma	85
3	UCLA	72
10	Creighton	52
2	Tennessee	68

Regional semifinals
1	Baylor	81
5	Louisville	82
6	Oklahoma	59
2	Tennessee	74

Regional Finals
5	Louisville	86
2	Tennessee	78

=== Spokane Regional ===
First round
1	Stanford	72
16	Tulsa	56
Stanford, CA – Sun/Tues
8	Michigan	60
9	Villanova	52
5	Iowa State	72
12	Gonzaga	60
Spokane, WA – Sat/Mon
4	Georgia	70
13	Montana	50
6	LSU	75
11	Green Bay	71
Baton Rouge, LA – Sun/Tues
3	Penn State	85
14	Cal Poly	55
7	Texas Tech	70
10	South Florida	71
Lubbock, TX – Sat/Mon
2	California	90
15	Fresno State	76

Second Round
1	Stanford	73
8	Michigan	40
5	Iowa State	60
4	Georgia	65
6	LSU	71
3	Penn State	66
10	South Florida	78*
2	California	82

Regional semifinals
1	Stanford	59
4	Georgia	61
6	LSU	63
2	California	73

Regional Finals
4	Georgia	62*
2	California	65

=== Norfolk Regional ===
First round
1	Notre Dame	97
16	Tennessee-Martin	64
Iowa City, IA – Sun/Tues
8	Miami	53
9	Iowa	69
5	Colorado	52
12	Kansas	67
Boulder, CO – Sat/Mon
4	South Carolina	74
13	South Dakota State	53
6	Nebraska	72
11	Chattanooga	59
College Station, TX – Sat/Mon
3	Texas A&M	71
14	Wichita State	45
7	Oklahoma State	73
10	DePaul	56
Durham, NC – Sun/Tues
2	Duke	67
15	Hampton	51

Second Round
1	Notre Dame	74
9	Iowa	57
12	Kansas	75
4	South Carolina	69
6	Nebraska	74
3	Texas A&M	63
7	Oklahoma State	59
2	Duke	68

Regional semifinals
1	Notre Dame	93
12	Kansas	63
6	Nebraska	45
2	Duke	53

Regional Finals
1	Notre Dame	87
2	Duke	76

=== Bridgeport Regional ===
First round
1	Connecticut	105
16	Idaho	37
Storrs, CT – Sat/Mon
8	Vanderbilt	60
9	Saint Joseph's	54
5	Michigan State	55
12	Marist	47
College Park, MD – Sat/Mon
4	Maryland	72
13	Quinnipiac	52
6	Delaware	66
11	West Virginia	53
Newark, DE – Sun/Tues
3	North Carolina	59
14	Albany	54
7	Dayton	96**
10	St. John's	90
Jamaica, NY – Sun/Tues
2	Kentucky	61
15	Navy	41

Second Round
1	Connecticut	77
8	Vanderbilt	44
5	Michigan State	49
4	Maryland	74
6	Delaware	78
3	North Carolina	69
7	Dayton	70
2	Kentucky	84

Regional semifinals
1	Connecticut	76
4	Maryland	50
6	Delaware	62
2	Kentucky	69

Regional Finals
1	Connecticut	83
2	Kentucky	53

=== Final Four – New Orleans, Louisiana ===
National semifinals April 7
OKC5	Louisville	64
SPK2	California	57
NRF1	Notre Dame	65
BRP1	Connecticut	83

National Championship Game; April 9
OKC5	Louisville	60
BRP1	Connecticut	93

== All-Tournament team ==
- Breanna Stewart, Connecticut
- Bria Hartley, Connecticut
- Kaleena Mosqueda-Lewis, Connecticut
- Kelly Faris, Connecticut
- Antonita Slaughter, Louisville

== Game officials ==
- Dennis DeMayo (semifinal)
- Charles Gonzalez (semifinal)
- Felicia Grinter (semifinal)
- Dee Kantner (semifinal)
- Tina Napier (semifinal)
- Mark Zentz (semifinal)
- Denise Brooks (final)
- Lisa Mattingly (final)
- Brenda Pantoja (final)

== Record by conference ==
Conference	Bids	Record	Win %	R64	R32	S16	E8	F4	CG	NC
Big East	8	16–7	0.696	8	4	3	3	3	2	1
Colonial	1	2–1	0.667	1	1	1	0	0	0	0
SEC	7	14–7	0.667	7	7	4	3	0	0	0
Pac-12	4	7–4	0.636	4	3	2	1	1	0	0
ACC	5	7–5	0.583	5	4	2	1	0	0	0
Big Ten	6	7–6	0.538	6	6	1	0	0	0	0
Big 12	7	8–7	0.533	7	5	3	0	0	0	0
Atlantic 10	2	1–2	0.333	2	1	0	0	0	0	0
Missouri Valley	2	1–2	0.333	2	1	0	0	0	0	0

- The R64, R32, S16, E8, F4, CG, and NC columns indicate how many teams from each conference were in the round of 64 (first round), round of 32 (second round), Sweet 16, Elite Eight, Final Four, championship game, and national champion, respectively.
- The America East, Atlantic Sun, Big Sky, Big South, Big West, Conference USA, Horizon, Ivy, MEAC, Metro Atlantic, Mid-American (MAC), Mountain West, Northeast, Ohio Valley, Patriot, Southern, Southland, Summit, Sun Belt, SWAC, West Coast and WAC conferences each had one representative that was eliminated in the first round.

== Media coverage ==
=== Television ===
ESPN had US television rights to all games during the tournament. For the first and second round, ESPN aired select games nationally on ESPN, ESPNU, or ESPNews. All other games were aired regionally on ESPN or ESPN2 and streamed online via ESPN3. Most of the nation got whip-a-round coverage during this time, which allowed ESPN to rotate between the games and focus the nation on the one that was the closest. The regional semifinals were split between ESPN and ESPN2, and ESPN aired the regional finals, national semifinals, and championship match.

==== Studio host and analysts ====
- Kevin Negandhi (Host)
- Kara Lawson (Analyst)
- Carolyn Peck (Analyst)

==== Commentary teams ====
First & Second Rounds Saturday/Monday

- Marc Kestecher and LaChina Robinson – College Park, Maryland
- Clay Matvick and Swin Cash – Columbus, Ohio
- Bob Wischusen and Nell Fortner – Knoxville, Tennessee
- Dave O'Brien and Doris Burke – Storrs, Connecticut
- Mark Jones and Fran Fraschilla – Boulder, Colorado
- Carter Blackburn and Maria Taylor – College Station, Texas
- Cara Capuano and Stephen Bardo – Lubbock, Texas
- Dave Flemming and Sean Farnham – Spokane, Washington

Sweet Sixteen & Elite Eight Saturday/Monday

- Beth Mowins, Doris Burke, and Holly Rowe – Bridgeport, Connecticut
- Dave Pasch, Debbie Antonelli, and LaChina Robinson – Spokane, Washington

Final Four

- Dave O'Brien, Doris Burke, Rebecca Lobo, and Holly Rowe – New Orleans, Louisiana

First & Second Rounds Sunday/Tuesday

- Pam Ward and Rebecca Lobo – Newark, Delaware
- Joe Davis and Debbie Antonelli – Durham, North Carolina
- Melissa Lee and Brooke Weisbrod – Louisville, Kentucky
- Bob Picozzi and Rosalyn Gold-Onwude – Queens, New York
- Tom Hart and Krista Blunk – Baton Rouge, Louisiana
- Holly Rowe and Brenda VanLengen – Iowa City, Iowa
- Dave Pasch and Mary Murphy – Stanford, California
- Beth Mowins and Stephanie White – Waco, Texas

Sweet Sixteen & Elite Eight Sunday/Tuesday

- Dave O'Brien, Stephanie White, and Jeannine Edwards – Norfolk, Virginia
- Pam Ward, Rebecca Lobo, and Maria Taylor – Oklahoma City, Oklahoma

Championship

- Dave O'Brien, Doris Burke, Rebecca Lobo, and Holly Rowe – New Orleans, Louisiana

=== Radio ===
Dial Global Sports had exclusive radio rights from the regional finals on through the championship.

Regional Finals Monday

- John Sadak and Ann Schatz – Bridgeport, Connecticut
- Roxy Bernstein and Mary Murphy – Spokane, Washington

Final Four

- Dave Ryan, Debbie Antonelli, and Krista Blunk – New Orleans, Louisiana

Regional Finals Tuesday

- Dave Ryan and Krista Blunk – Norfolk, Virginia
- Craig Way and Ann Meyers Drysdale – Oklahoma City, Oklahoma

Championship

- Dave Ryan, Debbie Antonelli, and Krista Blunk – New Orleans, Louisiana

== See also ==
- NCAA Women's Division I Basketball Championship
- 2013 NCAA Division I men's basketball tournament
- 2013 National Invitation Tournament
- 2013 Women's National Invitation Tournament
- 2013 Women's Basketball Invitational
- 2013 NCAA Division II women's basketball tournament
- 2013 NCAA Division III women's basketball tournament
- 2013 NAIA Division I women's basketball tournament
- 2013 NAIA Division II women's basketball tournament
