= 2020–21 Big Ten Conference women's basketball season =

- League: NCAA Division I
- Sport: Basketball
- Teams: 14
- TV partner(s): Big Ten Network, ESPN, Fox, FS1

2020–21 NCAA Division I women's basketball season
- Regular season champions: Maryland

Tournament
- Champions: Maryland
- Runners-up: Iowa
- Finals MVP: Diamond Miller

Basketball seasons
- 2019–20 2021–22

2020–21 Big Ten women's basketball standings
	Conf.				Overall
Team	W		L	PCT	W		L	PCT
No. 7 Maryland †	17	–	1	.944	26	–	2	.929
No. 12 Indiana	16	–	2	.889	20	–	5	.800
No. 21 Rutgers	10	–	3	.769	14	–	5	.737
No. 16 Michigan	9	–	4	.692	16	–	6	.727
Northwestern	11	–	7	.611	16	–	9	.640
Iowa	11	–	8	.579	20	–	9	.690
No. 22 Ohio State	9	–	7	.563	13	–	7	.650
Michigan State	8	–	7	.533	15	–	9	.625
Nebraska	9	–	10	.474	13	–	13	.500
Minnesota	7	–	11	.389	8	–	13	.381
Penn State	6	–	13	.316	9	–	15	.375
Purdue	4	–	14	.222	7	–	16	.304
Illinois	2	–	16	.111	5	–	18	.217
Wisconsin	2	–	18	.100	5	–	19	.208
† 2021 Big Ten tournament winner As of March 27, 2021; Rankings from AP poll

The 2020–21 Big Ten women's basketball season began with practices in October 2020, followed by the start of the 2020–21 NCAA Division I women's basketball season in November 2020. The regular season will end in March, 2021.

The Big Ten tournament will be played at Bankers Life Fieldhouse in Indianapolis, Indiana in March 2021.

== Head coaches ==
=== Coaches ===
Team	Head coach	Previous job	Years at school	Overall record	Big Ten record	Big Ten titles	Big Ten tournament titles	NCAA Tournaments	NCAA Final Fours	NCAA Championships
Illinois	Nancy Fahey	Washington (MO)	4	30–58	4–46	0	0	0	0	0
Indiana	Teri Moren	Indiana State	7	127–74	56–48	0	0	2	0	0
Iowa	Lisa Bluder	Drake	21	416–222	207–128	1	2	14	0	0
Maryland	Brenda Frese	Minnesota	19	486–128	92–12*	5	4	16	3	1
Michigan	Kim Barnes Arico	St. John's (Asst.)	9	177–96	76–60	0	0	3	0	0
Michigan State	Suzy Merchant	Eastern Michigan	14	281–148	136–86	2	0	9	0	0
Minnesota	Lindsay Whalen	Minnesota Lynx (Player)	3	37–26	14–22	0	0	0	0	0
Nebraska	Amy Williams	South Dakota	5	59–62	30–38	0	0	1	0	0
Northwestern	Joe McKeown	George Washington	12	206–175	83–121	0	0	1	0	0
Ohio State	Kevin McGuff	Washington	8	155–77	82–38	2	1	4	0	0
Penn State	Carolyn Kieger	Marquette	2	7–23	1–17	0	0	0	0	0
Purdue	Sharon Versyp	Indiana	15	294–176	136–102	0	4	9	0	0
Rutgers	C. Vivian Stringer	Iowa	26	521–286	53–49*	0	0	16	2	0
Wisconsin	Jonathan Tsipis	George Washington	5	44–79	12–56	0	0	0	0	0

Notes:

- All records, appearances, titles, etc. are from time with current school only.
- Year at school includes 2020–21 season.
- Overall and Big Ten records are from time at current school and are through the beginning of the season.
- Frese's ACC conference record excluded since Maryland began Big Ten Conference play in 2014–15.
- Stringer's Big East and American conference record excluded since Rutgers began Big Ten Conference play in 2014–15.

== Preseason ==
=== Preseason conference poll ===
The Big Ten released the preseason ranking on November 11, 2020, which featured a ranking by both media and coaches.

Media
Ranking	Team
1	Indiana
2	Northwestern
3	Maryland
4	Michigan
5	Ohio State

Coaches
Ranking	Team
1	Indiana
2	Maryland
3	Michigan
4	Northwestern
5	Ohio State

=== Preseason national polls ===
	AP	CBS Sports	Coaches	ESPNW
Illinois				
Indiana	16	18	15	17
Iowa				
Maryland	12	10	11	12
Michigan	25	24	24	25
Michigan State				
Minnesota				
Nebraska				
Northwestern	17	15	16	16
Ohio State	20	25	22	21
Penn State				
Purdue				
Rutgers				
Wisconsin				

== Honors and awards ==
=== All-Big Ten awards and teams ===
On March 8, 2021, the Big Ten announced its conference awards.

Honor	Winner
Player of the Year	Naz Hillmon, Michigan
Coach of the Year	Brenda Frese, Maryland
Freshman of the Year	Caitlin Clark, Iowa
Defensive Player of the Year	Veronica Burton, Northwestern
Sixth Player of the Year	Maddie Burke, Penn State
All-Big Ten First Team	Grace Berger, Indiana
All-Big Ten First Team	Mackenzie Holmes, Indiana
All-Big Ten First Team	Caitlin Clark, Iowa
All-Big Ten First Team	Monika Czinano, Iowa
All-Big Ten First Team	Diamond Miller, Maryland
All-Big Ten First Team	Ashley Owusu, Maryland
All-Big Ten First Team	Naz Hillmon, Michigan
All-Big Ten First Team	Nia Clouden, Michigan State
All-Big Ten First Team	Veronica Burton, Northwestern
All-Big Ten First Team	Dorka Juhász, Ohio State
All-Big Ten First Team	Arella Guirantes, Rutgers
All-Big Ten Second Team	Ali Patberg, Indiana
All-Big Ten Second Team	Katie Benzan, Maryland
All-Big Ten Second Team	Leigha Brown, Michigan
All-Big Ten Second Team	Jasmine Powell, Minnesota
All-Big Ten Second Team	Sam Haiby, Nebraska
All-Big Ten Second Team	Lindsey Pulliam, Northwestern
All-Big Ten Second Team	Jacy Sheldon, Ohio State
All-Big Ten Second Team	Kayana Traylor, Purdue
All-Big Ten Second Team	Diamond Johnson, Rutgers
All-Big Ten Honorable Mention	Chloe Bibby, Maryland
All-Big Ten Honorable Mention	Sara Scalia, Minnesota
All-Big Ten Honorable Mention	Isabelle Bourne, Nebraska
All-Big Ten Honorable Mention	Kate Cain, Nebraska
All-Big Ten Honorable Mention	Madison Greene, Ohio State
All-Big Ten Honorable Mention	Johnasia Cash, Penn State
All-Big Ten Honorable Mention	Makenna Marisa, Penn State
All-Big Ten Honorable Mention	Tekia Mack, Rutgers
All-Big Ten Honorable Mention	Sydney Hilliard, Wisconsin
All-Big Ten Honorable Mention	Imani Lewis, Wisconsin
All-Freshman Team	Caitlin Clark, Iowa
All-Freshman Team	Kateri Poole, Ohio State
All-Freshman Team	Maddie Burke, Penn State
All-Freshman Team	Madison Layden, Purdue
All-Freshman Team	Diamond Johnson, Rutgers
All-Defensive Team	Akienreh Johnson, Michigan
All-Defensive Team	Kate Cain, Nebraska
All-Defensive Team	Veronica Burton, Northwestern
All-Defensive Team	Sydney Wood, Northwestern
All-Defensive Team	Tekia Mack, Rutgers
