= 2020–21 Wisconsin Badgers women's basketball team =

Intercollegiate basketball season

2020–21 Wisconsin Badgers women's basketball
- Conference: Big Ten Conference
- Record: 5–19 (2–18 Big Ten)
- Head coach: Jonathan Tsipis (5th season)
- Associate head coach: Kayla Karius
- Assistant coaches: Craig Carter; Lindsay Wisdom-Hylton
- Home arena: Kohl Center

2020–21 Big Ten women's basketball standings
	Conf.				Overall
Team	W		L	PCT	W		L	PCT
No. 7 Maryland †	17	–	1	.944	26	–	2	.929
No. 12 Indiana	16	–	2	.889	20	–	5	.800
No. 21 Rutgers	10	–	3	.769	14	–	5	.737
No. 16 Michigan	9	–	4	.692	16	–	6	.727
Northwestern	11	–	7	.611	16	–	9	.640
Iowa	11	–	8	.579	20	–	9	.690
No. 22 Ohio State	9	–	7	.563	13	–	7	.650
Michigan State	8	–	7	.533	15	–	9	.625
Nebraska	9	–	10	.474	13	–	13	.500
Minnesota	7	–	11	.389	8	–	13	.381
Penn State	6	–	13	.316	9	–	15	.375
Purdue	4	–	14	.222	7	–	16	.304
Illinois	2	–	16	.111	5	–	18	.217
Wisconsin	2	–	18	.100	5	–	19	.208
† 2021 Big Ten tournament winner As of March 27, 2021; Rankings from AP poll

The 2020–21 Wisconsin Badgers women's basketball team represented the University of Wisconsin–Madison during the 2020–21 NCAA Division I women's basketball season. The Badgers were led by fifth-year head coach Jonathan Tsipis and play their home games at the Kohl Center as members of the Big Ten Conference. They competed in the 2020–21 Big Ten Conference season and the 2021 Big Ten women's basketball tournament.

== Previous season ==
The Badgers finished the 2019–20 season 12–19, including 3–15 in Big Ten play to finish in 12th place. They lost in the second round of the Big Ten women's tournament to Rutgers after beating Illinois.

After the season, the team lost four players to graduation and three players to transfers, but added two players as transfers.

== Roster ==
2020–21 Wisconsin Badgers women's basketball team
Players
Coaches

Pos.	#	Name	Height	Year	Previous school	Hometown
G	1	Estella Moschkau	6 ft 1 in (1.85 m)	GS	Edgewood High School	Madison, WI
G	3	Brooke Schramek	6 ft 0 in (1.83 m)	Fr	Benet Academy	Naperville, IL
F	5	Julie Pospisilova	6 ft 1 in (1.85 m)	So	Downers Grove North	Prague, Czech Republic
G	10	Halle Douglass	6 ft 1 in (1.85 m)	Fr	Lake Forest	Lake Forest, IL
F	12	Carmen Backes	6 ft 1 in (1.85 m)	RS So	Chisago Lakes	Lindstrom, MN
F	13	Sydney Mathiason	6 ft 1 in (1.85 m)	Jr	Monroe	Monroe, WI
F/C	22	Lovisa Djurström	6 ft 4 in (1.93 m)	Fr	Marks Gymnasieskola	Gothenburg
G	23	Lexi Duckett	5 ft 11 in (1.8 m)	So	Father Lopez	Daytona Beach
G	24	Natalie Leuzinger (W)	5 ft 8 in (1.73 m)	Fr	Black Hawk High School	Monroe, WI
G	30	Sydney Hilliard	6 ft 0 in (1.83 m)	So	Monroe	Monroe, WI
F/C	32	Kate Thompson	6 ft 2 in (1.88 m)	Fr	Denham Springs	Denham Springs, LA
F	34	Imani Lewis	6 ft 1 in (1.85 m)	Jr	Life Center Academy	Willingboro, NJ
G	40	Tara Stauffacher	5 ft 11 in (1.8 m)	So	Beaver Dam	Beaver Dam, WI
C	41	Sara Stapleton	6 ft 3 in (1.91 m)	So	Centennial High School	Blaine, MN
F	44	Alex Leuhring	6 ft 2 in (1.88 m)	RS Jr	UW-Green Bay	Verona, WI

Head coach

- Jonathan Tsipis (North Carolina)

Assistant coach(es)

- Kayla Karius (Green Bay)
- Craig Carter (Rutgers)
- Lindsay Wisdom-Hylton (Purdue)

Legend

- (C) Team captain
- (S) Suspended
- (I) Ineligible
- (W) Walk-on
- Injured
- Current redshirt

Roster
Last update: November 18, 2020

== Recruiting class ==
College recruiting information
Name	Hometown	School	Height	Weight	Commit date
Brooke Schramek; F	Naperville, IL	Benet Academy	6 ft 0 in (1.83 m)	N/A	
Brooke Schramek; F	Recruit ratings: ESPN: (90)				
Halle Douglass; PG	Lake Forest, IL	Lake Forest	6 ft 1 in (1.85 m)	N/A	
Halle Douglass; PG	Recruit ratings: ESPN: (93)				
Lovisa Djurström; F/C	Gothenburg	Marks Gymnasieskola	6 ft 4 in (1.93 m)	N/A	
Lovisa Djurström; F/C	Recruit ratings: No ratings found				
Kate Thompson; F/C	Denham Springs, LA	Denham Springs	6 ft 2 in (1.88 m)	N/A	
Kate Thompson; F/C	Recruit ratings: ESPN: (90)				
Overall recruit ranking:
Note: In many cases, Scout, Rivals, 247Sports, On3, and ESPN may conflict in their listings of height and weight.; In these cases, the average was taken. ESPN grades are on a 100-point scale.; Sources:

== Schedule and results ==
Date time, TV	Rank^{#}	Opponent^{#}	Result	Record	Site (attendance) city, state
Non-conference regular season
Nov 25, 2020* cancelled		Miami University	Cancelled due to COVID-19		Kohl Center; Madison, WI
Nov 29, 2020*; 2:00 pm		Western Illinois	W 73–66	1–0	Kohl Center; Madison, WI
Dec 5, 2020; 2:00 pm		at Iowa	L 78–85	1-1 (0-1)	Carver–Hawkeye Arena; Iowa City, IA
Dec 8, 2020* cancelled		Prairie View A&M	Cancelled due to COVID-19		Kohl Center; Madison, WI
Dec 11, 2020; 3:30 pm		Rutgers	L 65–70	1–2 (0–2)	Kohl Center; Madison, WI
Dec 13, 2020*; 2:00 pm		North Dakota	W 80–60	2–2 (0–2)	Kohl Center; Madison, WI
Dec 20, 2020*; 2:00 pm		Valparaiso	W 89–82	3–2 (0–2)	Kohl Center; Madison, WI
Dec 22, 2020* cancelled		University of Nebraska Omaha	Cancelled due to COVID-19		Kohl Center; Madison, WI
Big Ten regular season
Dec 31 2020; 11:30 am		at No. 16 Michigan	L 49–92	3–3 (0–3)	Crisler Center; Ann Arbor, MI
Jan 3, 2021; 2:00 pm		Minnesota	L 83–88	3–4 (0–4)	Kohl Center; Madison, WI
Jan 6, 2021; 3:00 pm		No. 22 Northwestern	L 55–80	3–5 (0–5)	Kohl Center; Madison, WI
Jan 10, 2021; 3:00 pm		at Indiana	L 49–74	3–6 (0–6)	Simon Skjodt Assembly Hall; Bloomington, IN
Jan 14, 2021; 7:00 pm		No. 13 Michigan	L 40–69	3–7 (0–7)	Kohl Center; Madison, WI
Jan 17, 2021; 2:00 pm		No. 9 Maryland	L 70–79	3–8 (0–8)	Kohl Center; Madison, WI
Jan 21, 2021; 5:00 pm		at Purdue	L 55–56	3–9 (0–9)	Mackey Arena; West Lafayette, IN
Jan 24, 2021; 2:00 pm		Michigan State	L 62–94	3–10 (0–10)	Kohl Center; Madison, WI
Jan 28, 2021; 7:00 pm		at Nebraska	L 68–84	3–11 (0–11)	Pinnacle Bank Arena; Lincoln, NE
Jan 31, 2021; 2:00 pm		Illinois	W 69–57	4–11 (1–11)	Kohl Center; Madison, WI
Feb 4, 2021; 3:00 pm		at No. 10 Maryland	L 48–84	4–12 (1–12)	Xfinity Center; College Park, MD
Feb 7, 2021; 1:00 pm		at Penn State	L 74–98	4–13 (1–13)	Bryce Jordan Center; University Park, PA
Feb 10, 2021; 6:00 pm		No. 12 Ohio State	W 75–70	5–13 (2–13)	Kohl Center; Madison, WI
Feb 14, 2021; 1:00 pm		at Minnesota	L 63-68	5-14 (2-14)	Williams Arena; Minneapolis, MN
Feb 20, 2021; 1:00 pm		at No. 24 Northwestern	L 54-67	5-15 (2-15)	Welsh-Ryan Arena; Evanston, IL
Feb 24, 2021		No. 11 Indiana	L 49-77	5-16 (2–16)	Kohl Center; Madison, WI
Feb 28, 2021		Iowa	L 70-84	5-17 (2-17)	Kohl Center; Madison, WI
Mar 6, 2021		Michigan State	L 54-67	5-18 (2-18)	Breslin Center; East Lansing, MI
Big Ten tournament
Mar 9, 2021; 1:00 PM, BTN		vs. Illinois; First round	L 42-67	5-19	Bankers Life Fieldhouse; Indianapolis, IN--->
*Non-conference game. ^{#}Rankings from AP Poll. (#) Tournament seedings in parentheses. All times are in Central Time.

== See also ==
2020–21 Wisconsin Badgers men's basketball team
