= 2020–21 Purdue Boilermakers women's basketball team =

Intercollegiate basketball season

2020–21 Purdue Boilermakers women's basketball
- Conference: Big Ten Conference
- Record: 7–16 (4–14 Big Ten)
- Head coach: Sharon Versyp (15th season)
- Assistant coaches: Melanie Balcomb; Beth Couture; Michael Scruggs
- Home arena: Mackey Arena

2020–21 Big Ten women's basketball standings
	Conf.				Overall
Team	W		L	PCT	W		L	PCT
No. 7 Maryland †	17	–	1	.944	26	–	2	.929
No. 12 Indiana	16	–	2	.889	20	–	5	.800
No. 21 Rutgers	10	–	3	.769	14	–	5	.737
No. 16 Michigan	9	–	4	.692	16	–	6	.727
Northwestern	11	–	7	.611	16	–	9	.640
Iowa	11	–	8	.579	20	–	9	.690
No. 22 Ohio State	9	–	7	.563	13	–	7	.650
Michigan State	8	–	7	.533	15	–	9	.625
Nebraska	9	–	10	.474	13	–	13	.500
Minnesota	7	–	11	.389	8	–	13	.381
Penn State	6	–	13	.316	9	–	15	.375
Purdue	4	–	14	.222	7	–	16	.304
Illinois	2	–	16	.111	5	–	18	.217
Wisconsin	2	–	18	.100	5	–	19	.208
† 2021 Big Ten tournament winner As of March 27, 2021; Rankings from AP poll

The 2020–21 Purdue Boilermakers women's basketball team represented Purdue University during the 2020–21 NCAA Division I women's basketball season. The Boilermakers, led by 15th-year head coach Sharon Versyp, played their home games at Mackey Arena and were a member of the Big Ten Conference.

They finished the season 7–16 and 4–14 in Big Ten play to finish in twelfth place. As the eleventh seed in the Big Ten tournament, they were defeated by Iowa in the second round. They were not invited to the NCAA tournament or the WNIT.

== Previous season ==
The Boilermakers finished the season with a record of 18–14, 8–10 in Big Ten play to finish in ninth place. As the ninth seed in the Big Ten women's tournament, they defeated Michigan State in the Second Round before losing to Maryland in the Quarterfinals. The NCAA tournament and WNIT were cancelled due to the COVID-19 outbreak.

== Roster ==
2020–21 Purdue Boilermakers women's basketball team
Players
Coaches

Pos.	#	Name	Height	Year	Previous school	Hometown
G	0	Brooke Moore	5 ft 7 in (1.7 m)	Jr	Henry County; Auburn	Atlanta, GA
G	1	Karissa McLaughlin	5 ft 7 in (1.7 m)	Sr	Homestead	Fort Wayne, IN
G	2	Bria Harmon	5 ft 7 in (1.7 m)	So	Collins Hill	Atlanta, GA
G	4	Rokia Doumbia	5 ft 9 in (1.75 m)	Jr	IMG Academy; Arkansas	Bamako, Mali
G	5	Cassidy Hardin	5 ft 10 in (1.78 m)	Jr	Center Grove	Bargersville, IN
G	12	Roxane Makolo	5 ft 10 in (1.78 m)	So	Dawson College	Saint-Hubert, QC
G	13	Ajah Stallings	5 ft 9 in (1.75 m)	Jr	North Central	Indianapolis, IN
F	22	Jenelle Grant	6 ft 0 in (1.83 m)	RS Sr	Harris Westminster; Pacific	London, England
G	23	Kayana Traylor	5 ft 9 in (1.75 m)	Jr	Martinsville	Martinsville, IN
C	24	Ra Shaya Kyle	6 ft 6 in (1.98 m)	Fr	Marion	Marion, IN
G/F	25	Tamara Farquhar	6 ft 0 in (1.83 m)	Sr	Dawson College	Pierrefonds, Quebec
F	30	Nyagoa Gony	6 ft 2 in (1.88 m)	Jr	Lincoln	Lincoln, NE
G	33	Madison Layden	6 ft 1 in (1.85 m)	Fr	Northwestern	Kokomo, IN
F	35	Rickie Woltman	6 ft 4 in (1.93 m)	So	Incarnate Word	St. Louis, MO
C	45	Fatou Diagne	6 ft 4 in (1.93 m)	RS Sr	Kocc Barma; Gulf Coast State	Thiès, Senegal

Head coach

- Sharon Versyp (Purdue)

Assistant coach(es)

- Melanie Balcomb (Trenton State)
- Beth Couture (Erskine)
- Michael Scruggs (Tennessee)

Legend

- (C) Team captain
- (S) Suspended
- (I) Ineligible
- (W) Walk-on
- Injured
- Current redshirt

Roster
Last update: July 6, 2021

== Schedule ==
Date time, TV	Rank^{#}	Opponent^{#}	Result	Record	Site (attendance) city, state
Non-conference regular season
November 29, 2020*; 6:00 p.m., BTN+		North Alabama	W 80–69	1–0	Mackey Arena (161); West Lafayette, IN
December 3, 2020*; 6:00 p.m., BTN+		Miami (OH)	Canceled		Mackey Arena; West Lafayette, IN
December 6, 2020*; 2:00 p.m., BTN+		Valparaiso	L 47–52	1–1	Mackey Arena (168); West Lafayette, IN
December 9, 2020*; 6:00 p.m., BTN+		Buffalo	W 82–70	2–1	Mackey Arena (147); West Lafayette, IN
December 13, 2020*; 2:00 p.m., BTN+		Bowling Green	W 79–73	3–1	Mackey Arena (139); West Lafayette, IN
Big Ten conference season
December 17, 2020; 7:00 p.m., BTN		No. 16 Northwestern	L 54–70	3–2 (0–1)	Mackey Arena (164); West Lafayette, IN
December 20, 2020; 2:00 p.m., BTN		at Penn State	W 91–87	4–2 (1–1)	Bryce Jordan Center (144); University Park, PA
December 23, 2020; 2:00 p.m., BTN		Nebraska	W 83–72	5–2 (2–1)	Mackey Arena (161); West Lafayette, IN
January 3, 2021; 2:00 p.m., BTN+		No. 25 Michigan State	L 64–71	5–3 (2–2)	Mackey Arena (152); West Lafayette, IN
January 7, 2021; 7:00 p.m., BTN		at Rutgers	Canceled		Louis Brown Athletic Center; Piscataway, NJ
January 10, 2021; Noon, BTN+		at No. 12 Maryland	L 46–83	5–4 (2–3)	Xfinity Center (0); College Park, MD
January 14, 2021; 4:00 p.m., BTN		No. 18 Indiana; Rivalry/Crimson and Gold Cup	L 45–66	5–5 (2–4)	Mackey Arena (160); West Lafayette, IN
January 18, 2021; 4:30 p.m., BTN		at Iowa	L 81–87	5–6 (2–5)	Carver–Hawkeye Arena (293); Iowa City, IA
January 21, 2021; 5:00 p.m., BTN		Wisconsin	W 56–55	6–6 (3–5)	Mackey Arena (161); West Lafayette, IN
January 24, 2021; 2:00 p.m., BTN		at No. 11 Michigan	Canceled		Crisler Center; Ann Arbor, MI
January 28, 2021; 5:00 p.m., BTN+		at Minnesota	L 72–77	6–7 (3–6)	Williams Arena (0); Minneapolis, MN
January 31, 2021; 1:00 p.m., BTN+		Penn State	L 70–80	6–8 (3–7)	Mackey Arena (150); West Lafayette, IN
February 7, 2021; 3:00 p.m., BTN+		at Illinois	L 49–54	6–9 (3–8)	State Farm Center (0); Champaign, IL
February 11, 2021; 6:00 p.m., BTN		No. 12 Michigan	L 49–62	6–10 (3–9)	Mackey Arena (161); West Lafayette, IN
February 14, 2021; 2:00 p.m., BTN+		Rutgers	L 57–75	6–11 (3–10)	Mackey Arena (161); West Lafayette, IN
February 18, 2021; 4:00 p.m., BTN+		at No. 15 Ohio State	L 85–100	6–12 (3–11)	Value City Arena (0); Columbus, OH
February 21, 2021; 11:30 a.m., FS1		at Michigan State	L 73–76	6–13 (3–12)	Breslin Center (51); East Lansing, MI
February 25, 2021; 6:00 p.m., BTN+		No. 8 Maryland	L 59–88	6–14 (3–13)	Mackey Arena (161); West Lafayette, IN
February 28, 2021; 2:00 p.m., BTN+		Illinois	W 70–66	7–14 (4–13)	Mackey Arena (130); West Lafayette, IN
March 6, 2021; 1:00 p.m., BTN+		at No. 10 Indiana; Rivalry/Crimson and Gold Cup	L 59–74	7–15 (4–14)	Simon Skjodt Assembly Hall (0); Bloomington, IN
Big Ten Women's Tournament
March 10, 2021; 9:00 p.m., FS2	(11)	vs. (6) Iowa; Second Round	L 72–83	7–16	Bankers Life Fieldhouse (1,064); Indianapolis, IN
*Non-conference game. ^{#}Rankings from AP Poll. (#) Tournament seedings in parentheses. All times are in Eastern Time.

== Rankings ==
Regular season polls
Poll	Pre- season	Week 2	Week 3	Week 4	Week 5	Week 6	Week 7	Week 8	Week 9	Week 10	Week 11	Week 12	Week 13	Week 14	Week 15	Week 16	Final
AP																	
Coaches																	

Legend
	Increase in ranking
	Decrease in ranking
	Not ranked previous week
(RV)	Received votes
(NR)	Not ranked and did not receive votes

The Coaches Poll did not release a Week 2 poll, and the AP Poll did not release a poll after the NCAA Tournament.

== See also ==
- 2020–21 Purdue Boilermakers men's basketball team
