= 2020–21 Ohio State Buckeyes women's basketball team =

Intercollegiate basketball season

2020–21 Ohio State Buckeyes women's basketball
- Conference: Big Ten Conference

Ranking
- AP: No. 22
- Record: 13–7 (9–7 Big Ten)
- Head coach: Kevin McGuff (8th season)
- Assistant coaches: Tamika Jeter; Carla Morrow
- Home arena: Value City Arena; Covelli Center

2020–21 Big Ten women's basketball standings
	Conf.				Overall
Team	W		L	PCT	W		L	PCT
No. 7 Maryland †	17	–	1	.944	26	–	2	.929
No. 12 Indiana	16	–	2	.889	20	–	5	.800
No. 21 Rutgers	10	–	3	.769	14	–	5	.737
No. 16 Michigan	9	–	4	.692	16	–	6	.727
Northwestern	11	–	7	.611	16	–	9	.640
Iowa	11	–	8	.579	20	–	9	.690
No. 22 Ohio State	9	–	7	.563	13	–	7	.650
Michigan State	8	–	7	.533	15	–	9	.625
Nebraska	9	–	10	.474	13	–	13	.500
Minnesota	7	–	11	.389	8	–	13	.381
Penn State	6	–	13	.316	9	–	15	.375
Purdue	4	–	14	.222	7	–	16	.304
Illinois	2	–	16	.111	5	–	18	.217
Wisconsin	2	–	18	.100	5	–	19	.208
† 2021 Big Ten tournament winner As of March 27, 2021; Rankings from AP poll

The 2020–21 Ohio State Buckeyes women's basketball team represented the Ohio State University during the 2020–21 NCAA Division I women's basketball season. The Buckeyes, led by eighth-year head coach Kevin McGuff, played their home games at Value City Arena and the Covelli Center. They were members of the Big Ten Conference.

They finished the season 13–7, 9–7 in Big Ten play to finish in seventh place. They did not participate in the Big Ten women's basketball tournament, NCAA tournament or the WNIT, due to a self-imposed postseason ban.

== Previous season ==
The Buckeyes finished the season 21–12, 11–7 in Big Ten play to finish in a tie for fifth place. As the sixth seed in the Big Ten women's basketball tournament, they defeated Minnesota, Iowa, and Michigan before losing to Maryland in the finals. They did not get a chance for further post-season play, as the NCAA women's basketball tournament and WNIT were cancelled before they began, due to the COVID-19 pandemic.

== Roster ==
2020–21 Ohio State Buckeyes women's basketball team
Players
Coaches

Pos.	#	Name	Height	Year	Previous school	Hometown
G	0	Madison Greene	5 ft 8 in (1.73 m)	So	Pickerington Central	Pickerington, OH
G	1	Rikki Harris	5 ft 10 in (1.78 m)	RS Fr	North Central	Indianapolis, IN
F	2	Gabby Hutcherson	6 ft 2 in (1.88 m)	Fr	Westerville South	Westerville, OH
G	3	Anyssa Jones	5 ft 10 in (1.78 m)	Fr	Westerville South	Westerville, OH
G	4	Jacy Sheldon	5 ft 10 in (1.78 m)	So	Dublin Coffman	Dublin, OH
G	5	Kateri Poole	5 ft 8 in (1.73 m)	Fr	South Shore	Bronx, NY
G	10	Braxtin Miller	5 ft 11 in (1.8 m)	Sr	Alter; Oklahoma State	Dayton, OH
F	14	Dorka Juhász	6 ft 4 in (1.93 m)	Jr	PTE Babits	Pécs, Hungary
G	21	Hevynne Bristow	6 ft 1 in (1.85 m)	So	Brooklyn Community; Providence	Brooklyn, NY
F	23	Rebeka Mikulášiková	6 ft 4 in (1.93 m)	So	Piaristické Gymnasium	Nitra, Slovakia
F	32	Aaliyah Patty	6 ft 3 in (1.91 m)	So	Montini Catholic	Lombard, IL
F	35	Tanaya Beacham	6 ft 1 in (1.85 m)	GS	Toledo Rogers; Toledo	Youngstown, OH

Head coach

- Kevin McGuff (Saint Joseph's (IN))

Assistant coach(es)

- Tamika Jeter (Connecticut)
- Carla Morrow (Tulsa)

Legend

- (C) Team captain
- (S) Suspended
- (I) Ineligible
- (W) Walk-on
- Injured
- Current redshirt

Roster
Last update: June 21, 2021

== Schedule and results ==
Date time, TV	Rank^{#}	Opponent^{#}	Result	Record	Site (attendance) city, state
Non-conference regular season
November 25, 2020*	No. 20	Akron	Canceled		Value City Arena; Columbus, OH
November 29, 2020*; 4:00 p.m.	No. 20	Duquesne	W 82–47	1–0	Covelli Center (0); Columbus, OH
December 2, 2020*; Noon	No. 19	Kent State	W 103–47	2–0	Covelli Center (0); Columbus, OH
December 6, 2020*; 2:00 p.m.	No. 19	Northern Kentucky	W 96–63	3–0	Value City Arena (0); Columbus, OH
December 10, 2020*; 4:00 p.m.	No. 18	Miami (OH)	W 104–65	4–0	Value City Arena (0); Columbus, OH
December 15, 2020*	No. 17	Saint Mary's	Canceled		Value City Arena; Columbus, OH
Big Ten regular season
December 19, 2020	No. 17	Iowa	Postponed		Value City Arena; Columbus, OH
December 23, 2020	No. 16	at No. 14 Maryland	Postponed		Xfinity Center; College Park, MD
December 31, 2020	No. 17	No. 25 Michigan State	Postponed		Value City Arena; Columbus, OH
January 4, 2021; 6:00 p.m.	No. 16	Penn State	W 82–69	5–0 (1–0)	Value City Arena (0); Columbus, OH
January 7, 2021; 6:00 p.m.	No. 16	at Illinois	W 78–55	6–0 (2–0)	State Farm Center (0); Champaign, IL
January 10, 2021	No. 16	Rutgers	Postponed		Value City Arena; Columbus, OH
January 13, 2021; 4:00 p.m.	No. 15	at Iowa	W 84–82 ^{OT}	7–0 (3–0)	Carver–Hawkeye Arena (326); Iowa City, IA
January 16, 2021; 4:00 p.m.	No. 15	at Nebraska	L 55–63	7–1 (3–1)	Value City Arena (0); Columbus, OH
January 21, 2021; 3:00 p.m.	No. 17	No. 11 Michigan; Rivalry	W 81–77	8–1 (4–1)	Value City Arena (0); Columbus, OH
January 25, 2021; 7:00 p.m.	No. 14	No. 7 Maryland	W 88–86	9–1 (5–1)	Value City Arena (52); Columbus, OH
January 28, 2021; 8:00 p.m.	No. 14	at No. 16 Indiana	W 78–70	10–1 (6–1)	Simon Skjodt Assembly Hall (0); Bloomington, IN
February 1, 2021; 7:00 p.m.	No. 11	at No. 22 Northwestern	L 57–69	10–2 (6–2)	Welsh–Ryan Arena (0); Evanston, IL
February 4, 2021; 6:00 p.m.	No. 11	Iowa	W 92–87	11–2 (7–2)	Value City Arena (54); Columbus, OH
February 7, 2021; 1:00 p.m.	No. 11	Minnesota	W 83–59	12–2 (8–2)	Value City Arena (58); Columbus, OH
February 10, 2021; 6:00 p.m.	No. 12	at Wisconsin	L 70–75	12–3 (8–3)	Kohl Center (0); Madison, WI
February 14, 2021	No. 12	No. 21 Northwestern	Canceled		Value City Arena; Columbus, OH
February 18, 2021; 4:00 p.m.	No. 15	Purdue	W 100–85	13–3 (9–3)	Value City Arena (0); Columbus, OH
February 21, 2021; 2:00 p.m.	No. 15	at No. 11 Michigan; Rivalry	L 66–75	13–4 (9–4)	Crisler Center (73); Ann Arbor, MI
February 24, 2021; 5:00 p.m.	No. 15	at Penn State	L 67–69	13–5 (9–5)	Bryce Jordan Center (201); University Park, PA
February 27, 2021; 3:00 p.m.	No. 15	No. 11 Indiana	L 75–87	13–6 (9–6)	Value City Arena (0); Columbus, OH
March 5, 2021; 8:00 p.m.	No. 22	at No. 24 Rutgers	L 63–71	13–7 (9–7)	Louis Brown Athletic Center (108); Piscataway, NJ
*Non-conference game. ^{#}Rankings from AP Poll. (#) Tournament seedings in parentheses. All times are in Eastern Time.

== Rankings ==
Regular season polls
Poll	Pre- season	Week 2	Week 3	Week 4	Week 5	Week 6	Week 7	Week 8	Week 9	Week 10	Week 11	Week 12	Week 13	Week 14	Week 15	Week 16	Final
AP	20	19	18	17	16	17	16	15	17	14	11	12т	15	15	22	22	22
Coaches	22	19	17	15	15	16	15	16	11	13	11	13т	14	20	24	24	RV

Legend
	Increase in ranking
	Decrease in ranking
	Not ranked previous week
(RV)	Received votes
(NR)	Not ranked and did not receive votes

== See also ==
- 2020–21 Ohio State Buckeyes men's basketball team
