= 2020–21 Illinois Fighting Illini women's basketball team =

Intercollegiate basketball season

2020–21 Illinois Fighting Illini women's basketball
- Conference: Big Ten Conference
- Record: 5–18 (2–16 Big Ten)
- Head coach: Nancy Fahey (4th season)
- Assistant coaches: John Patterson; Scott Merritt; Vernette Skeete
- Home arena: State Farm Center

2020–21 Big Ten women's basketball standings
| | Conf. | | | | Overall |
| Team | W | | L | PCT | W | | L | PCT |
|---|---|---|---|---|---|---|---|---|
| No. 7 Maryland † | 17 | – | 1 | .944 | 26 | – | 2 | .929 |
| No. 12 Indiana | 16 | – | 2 | .889 | 20 | – | 5 | .800 |
| No. 21 Rutgers | 10 | – | 3 | .769 | 14 | – | 5 | .737 |
| No. 16 Michigan | 9 | – | 4 | .692 | 16 | – | 6 | .727 |
| Northwestern | 11 | – | 7 | .611 | 16 | – | 9 | .640 |
| Iowa | 11 | – | 8 | .579 | 20 | – | 9 | .690 |
| No. 22 Ohio State | 9 | – | 7 | .563 | 13 | – | 7 | .650 |
| Michigan State | 8 | – | 7 | .533 | 15 | – | 9 | .625 |
| Nebraska | 9 | – | 10 | .474 | 13 | – | 13 | .500 |
| Minnesota | 7 | – | 11 | .389 | 8 | – | 13 | .381 |
| Penn State | 6 | – | 13 | .316 | 9 | – | 15 | .375 |
| Purdue | 4 | – | 14 | .222 | 7 | – | 16 | .304 |
| Illinois | 2 | – | 16 | .111 | 5 | – | 18 | .217 |
| Wisconsin | 2 | – | 18 | .100 | 5 | – | 19 | .208 |
† 2021 Big Ten tournament winner As of March 27, 2021; Rankings from AP poll

The 2020–21 Illinois Fighting Illini women's basketball team represented the University of Illinois during the 2020–21 NCAA Division I women's basketball season. The Fighting Illini, led by fourth-year head coach Nancy Fahey, played their home games at State Farm Center as members of the Big Ten Conference. Due to the COVID-19 pandemic in the United States, they played fewer non-conference games than in previous seasons; three games were originally postponed and later canceled due to the pandemic. They finished the season 5–18, 2–16 in Big Ten play to finish in thirteenth place. They lost in the second round of the Big Ten women's tournament to Northwestern. Their first round win against Wisconsin was the first Big Ten tournament victory in coach Fahey's tenure at Illinois.

== Previous season ==
The Illini finished the 2019–20 season 11–19, 2–16 in Big Ten play to finish in 13th (of 14) place. They lost in the first round of the Big Ten women's tournament to Wisconsin.

== Roster ==
2020–21 Illinois Fighting Illini women's basketball team
Players
Coaches

| Pos. | # | Name | Height | Year | Previous school | Hometown |
|---|---|---|---|---|---|---|
| G | 0 | J-Naya Ephraim | 5 ft 9 in (1.75 m) | Jr | Southern Durham | Saint Croix, USVI |
| F | 1 | Nancy Panagiotopoulou Andritsopoulou | 6 ft 3 in (1.91 m) | RS Jr | American Community Schools of Athens | Athens, Greece |
| F | 2 | Lyric Robins | 5 ft 11 in (1.8 m) | Sr | Plano West | Plano, TX |
| F | 3 | Solape Amusan | 6 ft 1 in (1.85 m) | So | Woodbury | Woodbury, MN |
| G | 10 | Jeanae Terry | 5 ft 11 in (1.8 m) | So | Wayne Memorial | Detroit, MI |
| G | 11 | Jada Peebles | 5 ft 10 in (1.78 m) | So | Wakefield | Raleigh, NC |
| G | 13 | Tara O'Malley | 5 ft 6 in (1.68 m) | GS | Mother McAuley | Chicago, IL |
| F/C | 14 | Geovana Lopes | 6 ft 3 in (1.91 m) | Jr | Odessa College | Bataguassu, Brazil |
| F | 20 | Erika Porter | 6 ft 3 in (1.91 m) | Fr | Notre Dame H.S. | West Windsor, NJ |
| G | 21 | Aaliyah McQueen | 5 ft 9 in (1.75 m) | Fr | Carman-Ainsworth | Flint, MI |
| C | 22 | Eva Rubin | 6 ft 5 in (1.96 m) | RS Jr | Homewood-Flossmoor | Flossmoor, IL |
| G | 32 | Aaliyah Nye | 5 ft 11 in (1.8 m) | Fr | East Lansing | East Lansing, MI |
| F | 44 | Kennedi Myles | 6 ft 2 in (1.88 m) | So | Walnut Hills | Cincinnati, OH |

Head coach

- Nancy Fahey (Wisconsin)

Assistant coach(es)

- John Patterson (Fontbonne)
- Scott Merritt (Marquette)
- Vernette Skeete (Alcorn State)

Legend

- (C) Team captain
- (S) Suspended
- (I) Ineligible
- (W) Walk-on
- Injured
- Current redshirt

Roster
Last update: March 23, 2021

== Schedule and results ==
- Due to the COVID-19 pandemic, games were played without an audience, or with very limited attendance.

| Date time, TV | Rank^{#} | Opponent^{#} | Result | Record | Site (attendance) city, state |
Non-conference regular season
| November 25, 2020*; 7:00 p.m., BTN+ | | Indiana State | W 68–49 | 1–0 | State Farm Center (103); Champaign, IL |
| December 2, 2020*; 5:00 p.m., BTN+ | | Valparaiso | L 59–62 | 1–1 | State Farm Center (0); Champaign, IL |
| December 6, 2020*; 2:00 p.m., BTN+ | | Omaha | W 53–50 | 2–1 | State Farm Center (106); Champaign, IL |
| December 22, 2020*; 2:00 p.m., BTN+ | | Southern Illinois | Canceled due to COVID-19 within the Southern Illinois program | | State Farm Center (0); Champaign, IL |
Big Ten conference season
| December 10, 2020; 7:00 p.m., BTN | | at Nebraska | L 72–78 | 2–2 (0–1) | Pinnacle Bank Arena (0); Lincoln, NE |
| December 19, 2020; 11:00 a.m., BTN | | No. 19 Michigan | Canceled due to COVID-19 within the Michigan program | | State Farm Center (0); Champaign, IL |
| December 31, 2020; 11:00 p.m., BTN+ | | at No. 20 Indiana | L 56–79 | 2–3 (0–2) | Simon Skjodt Assembly Hall (0); Bloomington, IN |
| January 3, 2021; 1:00 p.m., BTN+ | | Iowa | L 68–107 | 2–4 (0–3) | State Farm Center (0); Champaign, IL |
| January 7, 2021; 6:00 p.m., BTN | | No. 16 Ohio State | L 55–78 | 2–5 (0–4) | State Farm Center (0); Champaign, IL |
| January 10, 2021; 12:00 p.m., BTN+ | | at No. 15 Michigan | L 50–70 | 2–6 (0–5) | Crisler Center (50); Ann Arbor, MI |
| January 14, 2021; 6:00 p.m., BTN+ | | Michigan State | Canceled due to COVID-19 within the Michigan State program | | State Farm Center (0); Champaign, IL |
| January 21, 2021; 6:00 p.m., BTN+ | | at No. 21 Northwestern | L 54–73 | 2–7 (0–6) | Welsh–Ryan Arena (0); Evanston, IL |
| January 25, 2021; 7:00 p.m., BTN | | Nebraska | L 53–57 | 2–8 (0–7) | State Farm Center (0); Champaign, IL |
| January 28, 2021; 6:00 p.m., BTN+ | | Penn State | L 76–80 | 2–9 (0–8) | State Farm Center (0); Champaign, IL |
| January 31, 2021; 2:00 p.m., BTN+ | | at Wisconsin | L 57–69 | 2–10 (0–9) | Kohl Center (0); Madison, WI |
| February 4, 2021; 7:00 p.m., BTN | | at Michigan State | L 60–81 | 2–11 (0–10) | Breslin Center (0); East Lansing, MI |
| February 7, 2021; 2:00 p.m., BTN+ | | Purdue | W 54–49 | 3–11 (1–10) | State Farm Center (0); Champaign, IL |
| February 10, 2021; 6:00 p.m., BTN+ | | at Minnesota | L 73–83 | 3–12 (1–11) | Williams Arena (0); Minneapolis, MN |
| February 14, 2021; 2:00 p.m., BTN+ | | No. 15 Indiana | L 50–58 | 3–13 (1–12) | State Farm Center (0); Champaign, IL |
| February 17, 2021; 12:00 p.m., BTN | | at No. 9 Maryland | L 58–103 | 3–14 (1–13) | Xfinity Center (0); College Park, MD |
| February 20, 2021; 11:00 a.m., BTN | | at Rutgers | L 46–75 | 3–15 (1–14) | Rutgers Athletic Center (0); Piscataway, NJ |
| February 24, 2021; 6:00 p.m., BTN+ | | Northwestern | L 61–67 | 3–15 (1–15) | State Farm Center (0); Champaign, IL |
| February 28, 2021; 1:00 p.m., BTN+ | | at Purdue | L 66–70 | 3–17 (1–16) | Mackey Arena (130); West Lafayette, IN |
| March 5, 2021; 4:00 p.m., BTN+ | | Minnesota | W 72–64 | 4–17 (2–16) | State Farm Center (0); Champaign, IL |
Big Ten Women's Tournament
| March 9, 2021; 4:00 p.m., BTN | (12) | vs. (13) Wisconsin; First Round | W 67–42 | 5–17 | Bankers Life Fieldhouse (460); Indianapolis, IN |
| March 10, 2021; 12:30 p.m., BTN | (12) | vs. (5) Northwestern; Second Round | L 42–67 | 5–18 | Bankers Life Fieldhouse (716); Indianapolis, IN |
*Non-conference game. ^{#}Rankings from AP Poll. (#) Tournament seedings in parentheses. All times are in Central Time.

== Rankings ==
Regular season polls
| Poll | Pre- Season | Week 2 | Week 3 | Week 4 | Week 5 | Week 6 | Week 7 | Week 8 | Week 9 | Week 10 | Week 11 | Week 12 | Week 13 | Week 14 | Week 15 | Week 16 | Week 17 | Week 18 | Week 19 | Final |
|---|---|---|---|---|---|---|---|---|---|---|---|---|---|---|---|---|---|---|---|---|
| AP | | | | | | | | | | | | | | | | | | | | N/A |
| Coaches | | | | | | | | | | | | | | | | | | | | |

Legend
| | Increase in ranking |
| | Decrease in ranking |
| | Not ranked previous week |
| (RV) | Received Votes |

== See also ==
- 2020–21 Illinois Fighting Illini men's basketball team
