= 2020–21 Northwestern Wildcats women's basketball team =

Intercollegiate basketball season

2020–21 Northwestern Wildcats women's basketball

NCAA tournament, second round
- Conference: Big Ten Conference
- Record: 16–9 (11–7 Big Ten)
- Head coach: Joe McKeown (13th season)
- Assistant coaches: Kate Popovec; Preston Reid; Tangela Smith
- Home arena: Welsh–Ryan Arena

2020–21 Big Ten women's basketball standings
	Conf.				Overall
Team	W		L	PCT	W		L	PCT
No. 7 Maryland †	17	–	1	.944	26	–	2	.929
No. 12 Indiana	16	–	2	.889	20	–	5	.800
No. 21 Rutgers	10	–	3	.769	14	–	5	.737
No. 16 Michigan	9	–	4	.692	16	–	6	.727
Northwestern	11	–	7	.611	16	–	9	.640
Iowa	11	–	8	.579	20	–	9	.690
No. 22 Ohio State	9	–	7	.563	13	–	7	.650
Michigan State	8	–	7	.533	15	–	9	.625
Nebraska	9	–	10	.474	13	–	13	.500
Minnesota	7	–	11	.389	8	–	13	.381
Penn State	6	–	13	.316	9	–	15	.375
Purdue	4	–	14	.222	7	–	16	.304
Illinois	2	–	16	.111	5	–	18	.217
Wisconsin	2	–	18	.100	5	–	19	.208
† 2021 Big Ten tournament winner As of March 27, 2021; Rankings from AP poll

The 2020–21 Northwestern Wildcats women's basketball team represented Northwestern University during the 2020–21 NCAA Division I women's basketball season. The Wildcats were led by 13th-year head coach Joe McKeown. They played their home games at Welsh–Ryan Arena as members of the Big Ten Conference.

They finished the season 16–9, 11–7 in Big Ten play to finish in fifth place. They received a bye into the second round of the Big Ten women's tournament, where they defeated Illinois and Michigan before losing to eventual champions Maryland in the semifinals. They received an at-large bid to the NCAA tournament. As the seven seed in the Alamo Regional they defeated ten seed UCF in the first round before losing to two seed Louisville in the second round to end their season.

== Previous season ==
The Wildcats finished 26–4, 16–2 in Big Ten play to finish tied for first place. As the second seed in the Big Ten women's tournament they received a double-bye into the quarterfinals, where they lost to Michigan. They did not get a chance for further post-season play, as the NCAA women's basketball tournament and WNIT were cancelled before they began, due to the COVID-19 pandemic.

== Roster ==
2020–21 Northwestern Wildcats women's basketball team
Players
Coaches

Pos.	#	Name	Height	Year	Previous school	Hometown
G	0	Jess Sancataldo	6 ft 0 in (1.83 m)	Jr	Turamurra	Sydney, Australia
G	1	Kaylah Rainey	5 ft 6 in (1.68 m)	So	Belleville East	Belleville, IL
G	2	Lauryn Satterwhite	5 ft 7 in (1.7 m)	RS Jr	Valley Vista	Avondale, AZ
G	3	Sydney Wood	5 ft 11 in (1.8 m)	Jr	St. John's College	Olney, MD
G	10	Lindsey Pulliam	5 ft 10 in (1.78 m)	Sr	Our Lady of Good Counsel	Silver Spring, MD
G	11	Brooke Pikiell	5 ft 10 in (1.78 m)	Sr	Rutgers Prep	Far Hills, NJ
G	12	Veronica Burton	5 ft 9 in (1.75 m)	Jr	Newton South	Newton, MA
F	15	Courtney Shaw	6 ft 0 in (1.83 m)	Jr	Perry Hall	Perry Hall, MD
F	20	Paige Mott	6 ft 1 in (1.85 m)	Fr	Abington Friends	Philadelphia, PA
G	23	Jasmine McWilliams	5 ft 11 in (1.8 m)	Fr	North Central	Indianapolis, IN
G	24	Jordan Hamilton	5 ft 8 in (1.73 m)	Sr	Liberty	Frisco, TX
G	33	Laya Hartman	5 ft 11 in (1.8 m)	So	Okemos	Okemos, MI
F	42	Anna Morris	6 ft 3 in (1.91 m)	Fr	Immaculate Heart	Mahwah, NJ

Head coach

- Joe McKeown (Mercer)

Assistant coach(es)

- Kate Popovec (Northwestern)
- Preston Reid (Ball State)
- Tangela Smith (Iowa)

Legend

- (C) Team captain
- (S) Suspended
- (I) Ineligible
- (W) Walk-on
- Injured
- Current redshirt

Roster
Last update: June 17, 2021

== Schedule and results ==
Date time, TV	Rank^{#}	Opponent^{#}	Result	Record	Site (attendance) city, state
Regular season
December 6, 2020*; TBA	No. 17	Bradley	Canceled		Welsh–Ryan Arena; Evanston, IL
December 10, 2020*; 6:00 p.m., BTN+	No. 17	Eastern Illinois	W 93–57	1–0	Welsh–Ryan Arena (0); Evanston, IL
December 14, 2020; 8:00 p.m., BTN	No. 16	Minnesota	W 80–51	2–0 (1–0)	Welsh–Ryan Arena (0); Evanston, IL
December 17, 2020; 6:00 p.m., BTN	No. 16	at Purdue	W 70–54	3–0 (2–0)	Mackey Arena (164); West Lafayette, IN
December 22, 2020*; 1:00 p.m., BTN+	No. 15	Eastern Kentucky	W 79–50	4–0	Welsh–Ryan Arena (0); Evanston, IL
December 31, 2020; 1:00 p.m., BTN	No. 15	at Nebraska	L 63–65	4–1 (2–1)	Pinnacle Bank Arena (0); Lincoln, NE
January 3, 2021; 4:00 p.m., ESPN2	No. 15	No. 16 Michigan	L 63–84	4–2 (2–2)	Welsh–Ryan Arena (0); Evanston, IL
January 6, 2021; 3:00 p.m., BTN	No. 22	at Wisconsin	W 80–55	5–2 (3–2)	Kohl Center (0); Madison, WI
January 9, 2021; 6:00 p.m., BTN	No. 22	Iowa	W 77–67	6–2 (4–2)	Welsh–Ryan Arena (0); Evanston, IL
January 14, 2021; TBA, BTN+	No. 22	at Rutgers	Postponed		Louis Brown Athletic Center; Piscataway, NJ
January 17, 2021; 1:00 p.m., BTN+	No. 22	at Penn State	W 67–50	7–2 (5–2)	Bryce Jordan Center (219); University Park, PA
January 21, 2021; 6:00 p.m., BTN+	No. 21	Illinois	W 73–54	8–2 (6–2)	Welsh–Ryan Arena (0); Evanston, IL
January 24, 2021; 11:00 a.m., ESPN2	No. 21	No. 16 Indiana	L 61–74	8–3 (6–3)	Welsh–Ryan Arena (1); Evanston, IL
January 28, 2021; 5:00 p.m., BTN	No. 23	at Iowa	W 87–80	9–3 (7–3)	Carver–Hawkeye Arena (264); Iowa City, IA
February 1, 2021; 7:00 p.m., BTN	No. 22	No. 11 Ohio State	W 69–57	10–3 (8–3)	Welsh–Ryan Arena (0); Evanston, IL
February 7, 2021; 2:00 p.m., BTN+	No. 22	at Michigan State	W 63–60	11–3 (9–3)	Breslin Center (0); East Lansing, MI
February 11, 2021; 3:00 p.m., BTN	No. 21	Rutgers	L 54–70	11–4 (9–4)	Welsh–Ryan Arena (0); Evanston, IL
February 14, 2021; Noon, BTN	No. 21	at No. 13 Ohio State	Postopned		Value City Arena; Columbus, OH
February 17, 2021; 6:00 p.m., BTN+	No. 24	Nebraska	L 64–71	11–5 (9–5)	Welsh–Ryan Arena (0); Evanston, IL
February 20, 2021; 2:00 p.m., BTN+	No. 24	Wisconsin	W 67–54	12–5 (10–5)	Welsh–Ryan Arena (0); Evanston, IL
February 24, 2021; 6:00 p.m., BTN+		at Illinois	W 67–61	13–5 (11–5)	State Farm Center (0); Champaign, IL
February 28, 2021; 3:00 p.m., ESPN2		No. 8 Maryland	L 50–62	13–6 (11–6)	Welsh–Ryan Arena (20); Evanston, IL
March 6, 2021; 2:00 p.m., BTN+		at No. 12 Michigan	L 58–63	13–7 (11–7)	Crisler Center (60); Ann Arbor, MI
Big Ten Women's Tournament
March 10, 2021; 12:20 p.m., BTN	(5)	vs. (12) Illinois; Second Round	W 67–42	14–7	Bankers Life Fieldhouse (716); Indianapolis, IN
March 11, 2021; 12:20 p.m., FS2	(5)	vs. (4) No. 13 Michigan; Quarterfinals	W 65–49	15–7	Bankers Life Fieldhouse (779); Indianapolis, IN
March 12, 2021; 1:00 p.m., FS2	(5)	vs. (1) No. 7 Maryland; Semifinals	L 52–85	15–8	Bankers Life Fieldhouse (0); Indianapolis, IN
NCAA tournament
March 22, 2021; 3:00 p.m., ESPNU	(7 (A))	vs. (10 (A)) UCF; First Round	W 62–51	16–8	Bill Greehey Arena (0); San Antonio, TX
March 24, 2021; 4:00 p.m., ESPN2	(7 (A))	vs. (2 (A)) No. 8 Louisville; Second Round	L 53–62	16–9	Alamodome (0); San Antonio, TX
*Non-conference game. ^{#}Rankings from AP Poll. (#) Tournament seedings in parentheses. A=Alamo. All times are in Central Time.

== Rankings ==
Regular season polls
Poll	Pre- season	Week 2	Week 3	Week 4	Week 5	Week 6	Week 7	Week 8	Week 9	Week 10	Week 11	Week 12	Week 13	Week 14	Week 15	Week 16	Final
AP	17	15	17	16	15	15	22	22	21	23	22	21	24	RV	RV		RV
Coaches	16	17	18	16	16	23	23	22	23т	20	20	22	25	25	RV	RV	RV

Legend
	Increase in ranking
	Decrease in ranking
	Not ranked previous week
(RV)	Received votes
(NR)	Not ranked and did not receive votes
т	Tied with team above or below also with this symbol

The Coaches Poll did not release a Week 2 poll, and the AP Poll did not release a poll after the NCAA Tournament.

== See also ==
- 2020–21 Northwestern Wildcats men's basketball team
