= 2020–21 Michigan Wolverines women's basketball team =

Intercollegiate basketball season

2020–21 Michigan Wolverines women's basketball

NCAA women's tournament, Sweet Sixteen
- Conference: Big Ten Conference

Ranking
- Coaches: No. 11
- AP: No. 16
- Record: 16–6 (9–5 Big Ten)
- Head coach: Kim Barnes Arico (9th season)
- Assistant coaches: Wesley Brooks; Toyelle Wilson; Yvonne Sanchez
- Home arena: Crisler Center

2020–21 Big Ten women's basketball standings
	Conf.				Overall
Team	W		L	PCT	W		L	PCT
No. 7 Maryland †	17	–	1	.944	26	–	2	.929
No. 12 Indiana	16	–	2	.889	20	–	5	.800
No. 21 Rutgers	10	–	3	.769	14	–	5	.737
No. 16 Michigan	9	–	4	.692	16	–	6	.727
Northwestern	11	–	7	.611	16	–	9	.640
Iowa	11	–	8	.579	20	–	9	.690
No. 22 Ohio State	9	–	7	.563	13	–	7	.650
Michigan State	8	–	7	.533	15	–	9	.625
Nebraska	9	–	10	.474	13	–	13	.500
Minnesota	7	–	11	.389	8	–	13	.381
Penn State	6	–	13	.316	9	–	15	.375
Purdue	4	–	14	.222	7	–	16	.304
Illinois	2	–	16	.111	5	–	18	.217
Wisconsin	2	–	18	.100	5	–	19	.208
† 2021 Big Ten tournament winner As of March 27, 2021; Rankings from AP poll

The 2020–21 Michigan Wolverines women's basketball team represented the University of Michigan during the 2020–21 NCAA Division I women's basketball season. The Wolverines, led by head coach Kim Barnes Arico in her ninth year, played their home games at the Crisler Center. This season marked the program's 39th season as a member of the Big Ten Conference.

This season was highlighted by the Wolverines starting the season 10–0, their best start to a season in program history. They also reached No. 11 in the AP Poll, their highest rank ever, and were ranked the No. 6 seed in the 2021 NCAA tournament, their highest seed ever. The Wolverines also advanced to the Sweet Sixteen for the first time in program history.

== Previous season ==
The Wolverines finished the 2019–20 season with a 21–11 record, including 10–8 in Big Ten play to finish in seventh place. They advanced to the semifinals of the Big Ten women's tournament, where they lost to Ohio State. The 2020 NCAA Division I women's basketball tournament was cancelled due to the COVID-19 pandemic.

== Roster ==
2020–21 Michigan Wolverines women's basketball team
Players
Coaches

Pos.	#	Name	Height	Year	Previous school	Hometown
F	00	Naz Hillmon	6 ft 2 in (1.88 m)	Jr	Gilmour Academy	Cleveland, OH
G	1	Amy Dilk	6 ft 0 in (1.83 m)	Jr	Carmel	Carmel, IN
G	3	Maddie Nolan	5 ft 9 in (1.75 m)	So	Zionsville	Zionsville, IN
G	13	Meghan Fiso	5 ft 10 in (1.78 m)	Fr	Garfield	Seattle, WA
G	14	Akienreh Johnson	6 ft 0 in (1.83 m)	Sr	Rogers	Toledo, OH
F	15	Hailey Brown	6 ft 1 in (1.85 m)	Sr	The Rise Centre Academy	Hamilton, Ontario
G	23	Danielle Rauch	5 ft 8 in (1.73 m)	Jr	Bishop Ludden	Syracuse, NY
G	24	Michelle Sidor	5 ft 8 in (1.73 m)	So	Saddle River Day	Upper Saddle River, NJ
F	25	Whitney Sollom	6 ft 4 in (1.93 m)	Fr	Hartland	Hartland, MI
F	30	Elise Stuck	6 ft 1 in (1.85 m)	Fr	Charlevoix	Charlevoix, MI
F	32	Leigha Brown	6 ft 1 in (1.85 m)	Jr	DeKalb	Noblesville, IN
F	33	Emily Kiser	6 ft 3 in (1.91 m)	Jr	Noblesville	Noblesville, IN
C	34	Izabel Varejão	6 ft 4 in (1.93 m)	So	Neuse Christian Academy	Vitória, Brazil
F	44	Cameron Williams	6 ft 3 in (1.91 m)	Fr	Whitney Young	Chicago, IL

Head coach

- Kim Barnes Arico (Montclair State)

Assistant coach(es)

- Wesley Brooks (West Virginia)
- Toyelle Wilson (Manhattan)
- Yvonne Sanchez (Alliant)

Legend

- (C) Team captain
- (S) Suspended
- (I) Ineligible
- (W) Walk-on
- Injured
- Current redshirt

Roster

== Schedule and results ==
Date time, TV	Rank^{#}	Opponent^{#}	Result	Record	Site (attendance) city, state
Non-conference regular season
November 25, 2020*; 12:30 pm, BTN Plus	No. 25	Central Michigan	W 93–75	1–0	Crisler Center (0); Ann Arbor, MI
November 27, 2020*; 6:00 pm, ESPN+	No. 25	at Oakland	W 95–62	2–0	Athletics Center O'rena (0); Auburn Hills, MI
December 3, 2020*; 6:00 pm, ACCN	No. 24	at Notre Dame; ACC–Big Ten Women's Challenge	W 76–66	3–0	Edmund P. Joyce Center (122); Notre Dame, IN
December 6, 2020*; 12:30 pm, BTN Plus	No. 24	Wright State	W 82–59	4–0	Crisler Center (0); Ann Arbor, MI
December 9, 2020*; 1:00 pm, BTN Plus	No. 19	Butler	W 93–54	5–0	Crisler Center (0); Ann Arbor, MI
Big Ten conference season
December 19, 2020; 12:00 pm, BTN	No. 19	at Illinois	Postponed (COVID-19 pandemic)		State Farm Center; Champaign, IL
December 23, 2020; 12:30 pm, BTN Plus	No. 17	Penn State	Postponed (COVID-19 pandemic)		Crisler Center; Ann Arbor, MI
December 31, 2020; 12:30 pm, BTN Plus	No. 16	Wisconsin	W 92–49	6–0 (1–0)	Crisler Center (6); Ann Arbor, MI
January 3, 2021; 5:00 pm, ESPN2	No. 16	at No. 15 Northwestern	W 84–63	7–0 (2–0)	Welsh–Ryan Arena (0); Evanston, IL
January 7, 2021; 6:00 pm, BTN Plus	No. 15	Nebraska	W 64–62	8–0 (3–0)	Crisler Center (29); Ann Arbor, MI
January 10, 2021; 1:00 pm, BTN Plus	No. 15	Illinois	W 70–50	9–0 (4–0)	Crisler Center (50); Ann Arbor, MI
January 14, 2021; 8:00 pm, BTN	No. 13	at Wisconsin	W 69–40	10–0 (5–0)	Kohl Center (0); Madison, WI
January 18, 2021; 12:30 pm, BTN	No. 11	Michigan State; Rivalry	Postponed (COVID-19 pandemic)		Crisler Center; Ann Arbor, MI
January 21, 2021; 3:00 pm, BTN	No. 11	at No. 17 Ohio State; Rivalry	L 77–81	10–1 (5–1)	Value City Arena (0); Columbus, OH
January 24, 2021; 2:00 pm, BTN	No. 11	Purdue	Postponed (COVID-19 pandemic)		Crisler Center; Ann Arbor, MI
January 26, 2021; 7:00 pm, BTN	No. 12	at Michigan State; Rivalry	Postponed (COVID-19 pandemic)		Breslin Center; East Lansing, MI
February 1, 2021	No. 13	at Rutgers	Postponed (COVID-19 pandemic)		Louis Brown Athletic Center; Piscataway, NJ
February 4, 2021; 6:00 pm, BTN	No. 13	Minnesota	Postponed (COVID-19 pandemic)		Crisler Center; Ann Arbor, MI
February 7, 2021; 2:00 pm, ESPN/ESPN2	No. 13	Maryland	Postponed (COVID-19 pandemic)		Crisler Center; Ann Arbor, MI
February 11, 2021; 6:00 pm, BTN	No. 12	at Purdue	W 62–49	11–1 (6–1)	Mackey Arena (161); West Lafayette, IN
February 16, 2021; 4:30 pm, BTN	No. 11	Michigan State; Rivalry	W 86–82	12–1 (7–1)	Crisler Center (50); Ann Arbor, MI
February 18, 2021; 6:00 pm, BTN	No. 11	at No. 14 Indiana	L 65–70	12–2 (7–2)	Simon Skjodt Assembly Hall (0); Bloomington, IN
February 21, 2021; 2:00 pm, ESPN2	No. 11	No. 15 Ohio State; Rivalry	W 75–66	13–2 (8–2)	Crisler Center (73); Ann Arbor, MI
February 25, 2021; 9:30 pm	No. 12	at Iowa	L 67–89	13–3 (8–3)	Carver–Hawkeye Arena (332); Iowa City, IA
February 28, 2021; 2:30 pm, BTN	No. 12	at Minnesota	Cancelled (COVID-19 pandemic)		Williams Arena; Minneapolis, MN
March 4, 2021; 12:00 pm, BTN	No. 12	No. 8 Maryland	L 63–88	13–4 (8–4)	Crisler Center (36); Ann Arbor, MI
March 6, 2021; 3:00 pm	No. 12	Northwestern	W 63–58	14–4 (9–4)	Crisler Center (60); Ann Arbor, MI
Big Ten Women's Tournament
March 11, 2021; 1:30 pm, FS2	(4) No. 13	vs. (5) Northwestern; Quarterfinals	L 49–65	14–5	Bankers Life Fieldhouse (779); Indianapolis, IN
NCAA Women's Tournament
March 21, 2021; 3:00 pm, ESPN2	(6 RW) No. 16	vs. (11 RW) No. 24 Florida Gulf Coast; First round	W 87–66	15–5	Convocation Center; San Antonio, TX
March 23, 2021; 5:00 pm, ESPN2	(6 RW) No. 16	vs. (3 RW) No. 13 Tennessee; Second round	W 70–55	16–5	Alamodome; San Antonio, TX
March 27, 2021; 3:00 pm, ABC	(6 RW) No. 16	vs. (2 RW) No. 6 Baylor; Sweet Sixteen	L 75–78 ^{OT}	16–6	Alamodome; San Antonio, TX
*Non-conference game. ^{#}Rankings from AP Poll. (#) Tournament seedings in parentheses. RW=River Walk Region. All times are in Eastern Time. Source:

== Rankings ==
Ranking movement Legend: ██ Increase in ranking. ██ Decrease in ranking. NR = Not ranked. RV = Received votes.
Poll	Pre	Wk 2	Wk 3	Wk 4	Wk 5	Wk 6	Wk 7	Wk 8	Wk 9	Wk 10	Wk 11	Wk 12	Wk 13	Wk 14	Wk 15	Wk 16	Week 17	Final
AP	25	24	19	19	17	16	15	13	11	12	13	12	11	12	12	13	16	N/A
Coaches	24	24^	20	19	17	17	14	12	11	13	12	12	11	12	12	12	14	11

^Coaches did not release a Week 2 poll.

== Awards and honors ==
On March 8, 2021, the Big Ten announced its conference awards. Naz Hillmon was named Big Ten Conference Player of the Year and a unanimous All-Big Ten first team selection by both the coaches and media. Leigha Brown earned All-Big Ten second team honors by both the coaches and the media, and Akienreh Johnson was named to the All-Defensive team. Hillmon was also named a first-team All-American by Sports Illustrated, and second-team by Associated Press. Hillmon became the first Wolverine to be selected for All-America honors in program history.
