= 2020–21 Penn State Lady Lions basketball team =

Intercollegiate basketball season

2020–21 Penn State Lady Lions basketball
- Conference: Big Ten Conference
- Record: 9–15 (6–13 Big Ten)
- Head coach: Carolyn Kieger (2nd season)
- Assistant coaches: Aaron Kallhoff; Myia Johnson; Sarah Jenkins
- Home arena: Bryce Jordan Center

2020–21 Big Ten women's basketball standings
	Conf.				Overall
Team	W		L	PCT	W		L	PCT
No. 7 Maryland †	17	–	1	.944	26	–	2	.929
No. 12 Indiana	16	–	2	.889	20	–	5	.800
No. 21 Rutgers	10	–	3	.769	14	–	5	.737
No. 16 Michigan	9	–	4	.692	16	–	6	.727
Northwestern	11	–	7	.611	16	–	9	.640
Iowa	11	–	8	.579	20	–	9	.690
No. 22 Ohio State	9	–	7	.563	13	–	7	.650
Michigan State	8	–	7	.533	15	–	9	.625
Nebraska	9	–	10	.474	13	–	13	.500
Minnesota	7	–	11	.389	8	–	13	.381
Penn State	6	–	13	.316	9	–	15	.375
Purdue	4	–	14	.222	7	–	16	.304
Illinois	2	–	16	.111	5	–	18	.217
Wisconsin	2	–	18	.100	5	–	19	.208
† 2021 Big Ten tournament winner As of March 27, 2021; Rankings from AP poll

The 2020–21 Penn State Lady Lions basketball team represented Pennsylvania State University during the 2020–21 NCAA Division I women's basketball season. The Lady Lions were led by second-year head coach Carolyn Kieger and played their home games at the Bryce Jordan Center as members of the Big Ten Conference.

They finished the season 9–15 and 6–12 in Big Ten play to finish in eleventh place. As the tenth seed in the Big Ten tournament, they were defeated by Michigan State in the second round. They were not invited to the NCAA tournament or the WNIT.

== Previous season ==
The Lady Lions finished the season with a record of 7–23, 1–17 in Big Ten play to finish in fourteenth place. They lost in the first round of the Big Ten women's tournament to Minnesota. The NCAA tournament and WNIT were cancelled due to the COVID-19 outbreak.

== Roster ==
2020–21 Penn State Nittany Lions women's basketball team
Players
Coaches

Pos.	#	Name	Height	Year	Previous school	Hometown
G	0	Nyam Thornton	5 ft 7 in (1.7 m)	Fr	Columbus Africentric	Columbus, OH
G	1	Niya Beverly	5 ft 7 in (1.7 m)	Sr	St. John's College; Wisconsin	Laurel, MD
G	2	Mekkena Boyd	5 ft 8 in (1.73 m)	Fr	Champlain Valley Union	Williston, VT
G	3	Nia Staples	5 ft 8 in (1.73 m)	GS	Lakota West; West Virginia	Cincinnati, OH
G	4	Constance Thomas	5 ft 9 in (1.75 m)	Fr	Camp Jewell Academy	Plant City, FL
G	5	Leilani Kapinus	5 ft 10 in (1.78 m)	Fr	James Madison Memorial	Madison, WI
G	10	Tova Sabel	5 ft 10 in (1.78 m)	Fr	Bromma Gymnasium	Stockholm, Sweden
F	11	Anna Camden	6 ft 3 in (1.91 m)	So	Shipley	Downingtown, PA
G	15	Maddie Burke	6 ft 0 in (1.83 m)	Fr	Central Bucks West	Doylestown, PA
G	20	Makenna Marisa	5 ft 11 in (1.8 m)	So	Peters Township	McMurry, PA
G	21	Kaci Donovan	6 ft 1 in (1.85 m)	Fr	Owego Free Academy	Owego, NY
G	23	Shay Hagans	5 ft 6 in (1.68 m)	So	Osbourn Park	Manassas, VA
G	24	Nan Garcia	6 ft 0 in (1.83 m)	Fr	Jeffersonville	Jeffersonville, IN
G	25	Kelly Jekot	6 ft 0 in (1.83 m)	GS	Cumberland Valley; Villanova	Enola, PA
F	33	Johnasia Cash	6 ft 2 in (1.88 m)	Sr	McKeesport; SMU	McKeesport, PA

Head coach

- Carolyn Kieger (Marquette)

Assistant coach(es)

- Aaron Kallhoff (Bemidji State)
- Myia Johnson (Rutgers)
- Sarah Jenkins (Georgetown)

Legend

- (C) Team captain
- (S) Suspended
- (I) Ineligible
- (W) Walk-on
- Injured
- Current redshirt

Roster
Last update: July 2, 2021

== Schedule and results ==
Date time, TV	Rank^{#}	Opponent^{#}	Result	Record	Site (attendance) city, state
Non-conference regular season
November 25, 2020*; 6:00 p.m., PSSN		Coppin State	W 84–45	1–0	Bryce Jordan Center (179); University Park, PA
November 30, 2020*; 6:00 p.m., PSSN		St. Francis	W 87–54	2–0	Bryce Jordan Center (217); University Park, PA
December 3, 2020*; 6:00 p.m., PSSN		Rhode Island	W 70–69	3–0	Bryce Jordan Center (174); University Park, PA
December 6, 2020*; 2:00 p.m., ACCN		at No. 22 Syracuse	L 72–82	3–1	Carrier Dome (0); Syracuse, NY
Big Ten regular season
December 20, 2020; 2:00 p.m., BTN		Purdue	L 87–91	3–2 (0–1)	Bryce Jordan Center (144); University Park, PA
December 23, 2020; 12:30 p.m., BTN+		at No. 17 Michigan	Canceled		Crisler Center; Ann Arbor, MI
December 31, 2020; Noon, BTN		No. 14 Maryland	L 82–96	3–3 (0–2)	Bryce Jordan Center (140); University Park, PA
January 4, 2021; 6:00 p.m., BTN		at No. 16 Ohio State	L 69–82	3–4 (0–3)	Value City Arena (0); Columbus, OH
January 7, 2021; 6:00 p.m., BTN+		No. 19 Indiana	L 64–85	3–5 (0–4)	Bryce Jordan Center (175); University Park, PA
January 10, 2021; 5:00 p.m., BTN+		at Minnesota	W 69–60	4–5 (1–4)	Williams Arena (0); Minneapolis, MN
January 17, 2021; 2:00 p.m., BTN		No. 22 Northwestern	L 50–67	4–6 (1–5)	Bryce Jordan Center (219); University Park, PA
January 21, 2021; 7:00 p.m., BTN+		at Rutgers	Postponed		Louis Brown Athletic Center; Piscataway, NJ
January 25, 2021; 6:00 p.m., BTN		Minnesota	L 76–85	4–7 (1–6)	Bryce Jordan Center (180); University Park, PA
January 28, 2021; 7:00 p.m., BTN+		at Illinois	W 80–76	5–7 (2–6)	State Farm Center (0); Champaign, IL
January 31, 2021; 1:00 p.m., BTN+		at Purdue	W 80–70	6–7 (3–6)	Mackey Arena (150); West Lafayette, IN
February 4, 2021; 6:00 p.m., BTN+		Nebraska	W 85–74	7–7 (4–6)	Bryce Jordan Center (175); University Park, PA
February 7, 2021; 2:00 p.m., BTN+		Wisconsin	W 98–74	8–7 (5–6)	Bryce Jordan Center (176); University Park, PA
February 10, 2021; 3:00 p.m., BTN		at No. 15 Indiana	L 65–90	8–8 (5–7)	Simon Skjodt Assembly Hall (0); Bloomington, IN
February 13, 2021; Noon, BTN		Michigan State	L 65–78	8–9 (5–8)	Bryce Jordan Center (209); University Park, PA
February 18, 2021; 4:00 p.m., BTN		at Iowa	L 78–96	8–10 (5–9)	Carver–Hawkeye Arena (274); Iowa City, IA
February 21, 2021; 3:00 p.m., BTN+		at Nebraska	L 72–87	8–11 (5–10)	Pinnacle Bank Arena (0); Lincoln, NE
February 24, 2021; 5:00 p.m., BTN		No. 15 Ohio State	W 69–67	9–11 (6–10)	Bryce Jordan Center (201); University Park, PA
February 28, 2021; 12:30 p.m., BTN		No. 25 Rutgers	L 55–60	9–12 (6–11)	Bryce Jordan Center (221); University Park, PA
March 2, 2021; 5:30 p.m., BTN		at No. 24 Rutgers	L 56–74	9–13 (6–12)	Louis Brown Athletic Center (60); Piscataway, NJ
March 6, 2021; 3:00 p.m., BTN+		at No. 8 Maryland	L 61–88	9–14 (6–13)	Xfinity Center (0); College Park, MD
Big Ten Women's Tournament
March 10, 2021; 6:30 p.m., FS2	(10)	vs. (7) Michigan State; Second Round	L 66–75	9–15	Bankers Life Fieldhouse (1,064); Indianapolis, IN
*Non-conference game. ^{#}Rankings from AP Poll. (#) Tournament seedings in parentheses. All times are in Eastern Time.

== Rankings ==
Regular season polls
Poll	Pre- season	Week 2	Week 3	Week 4	Week 5	Week 6	Week 7	Week 8	Week 9	Week 10	Week 11	Week 12	Week 13	Week 14	Week 15	Week 16	Final
AP																	
Coaches																	

Legend
	Increase in ranking
	Decrease in ranking
	Not ranked previous week
(RV)	Received votes
(NR)	Not ranked and did not receive votes

The Coaches Poll did not release a Week 2 poll, and the AP Poll did not release a poll after the NCAA Tournament.

== See also ==
- 2020–21 Penn State Nittany Lions basketball team
