= 2020–21 Nebraska Cornhuskers women's basketball team =

Intercollegiate basketball season

2020–21 Nebraska Cornhuskers women's basketball
- Conference: Big Ten Conference
- Record: 13–13 (9–10 Big Ten)
- Head coach: Amy Williams (5th season)
- Assistant coaches: Tom Goehle; Chuck Love; Tandem Mays
- Home arena: Pinnacle Bank Arena

2020–21 Big Ten women's basketball standings
| | Conf. | | | | Overall |
| Team | W | | L | PCT | W | | L | PCT |
|---|---|---|---|---|---|---|---|---|
| No. 7 Maryland † | 17 | – | 1 | .944 | 26 | – | 2 | .929 |
| No. 12 Indiana | 16 | – | 2 | .889 | 20 | – | 5 | .800 |
| No. 21 Rutgers | 10 | – | 3 | .769 | 14 | – | 5 | .737 |
| No. 16 Michigan | 9 | – | 4 | .692 | 16 | – | 6 | .727 |
| Northwestern | 11 | – | 7 | .611 | 16 | – | 9 | .640 |
| Iowa | 11 | – | 8 | .579 | 20 | – | 9 | .690 |
| No. 22 Ohio State | 9 | – | 7 | .563 | 13 | – | 7 | .650 |
| Michigan State | 8 | – | 7 | .533 | 15 | – | 9 | .625 |
| Nebraska | 9 | – | 10 | .474 | 13 | – | 13 | .500 |
| Minnesota | 7 | – | 11 | .389 | 8 | – | 13 | .381 |
| Penn State | 6 | – | 13 | .316 | 9 | – | 15 | .375 |
| Purdue | 4 | – | 14 | .222 | 7 | – | 16 | .304 |
| Illinois | 2 | – | 16 | .111 | 5 | – | 18 | .217 |
| Wisconsin | 2 | – | 18 | .100 | 5 | – | 19 | .208 |
† 2021 Big Ten tournament winner As of March 27, 2021; Rankings from AP poll

The 2020–21 Nebraska Cornhuskers women's basketball team represented the University of Nebraska during the 2020–21 NCAA Division I women's basketball season. The Cornhuskers, led by fifth-year head coach Amy Williams, played their home games at Pinnacle Bank Arena and were members of the Big Ten Conference.

They finished the season 13–13, 9–10 in Big Ten play to finish in ninth place. As the eight seed in the Big Ten women's tournament they defeated Minnesota in the second round before losing to eventual champions Maryland in the quarterfinals. They received an at-large bid to the WNIT. They played in the Memphis regional and defeated UT Martin in the first round before losing to Colorado in the second round to end their season.

== Previous season ==
The Cornhuskers finished the season 17–13, 7–11 in Big Ten play to finish in tenth place. They lost in the second round of the Big Ten women's tournament to Michigan. The NCAA tournament and WNIT were cancelled due to the COVID-19 outbreak.

== Roster ==
2020–21 Nebraska Cornhuskers women's basketball team
Players
Coaches

| Pos. | # | Name | Height | Year | Previous school | Hometown |
|---|---|---|---|---|---|---|
| G | 0 | Ashley Scoffin | 5 ft 7 in (1.7 m) | RS So | Westview; Salt Lake CC | Dallas, OR |
| G | 2 | Trinity Brady | 5 ft 11 in (1.8 m) | So | Hamilton Heights Christian | Indianapolis IN |
| G | 4 | Sam Haiby | 5 ft 9 in (1.75 m) | Jr | Moorhead | Moorhead, MN |
| G | 5 | Mi'Cole Cayton | 5 ft 9 in (1.75 m) | Jr | Saint Mary's College; Cal | Stockton, CA |
| G | 10 | Whitney Brown | 5 ft 8 in (1.73 m) | Fr | Grand Island Northwest | Grand Island, NE |
| G | 11 | Ruby Porter | 5 ft 10 in (1.78 m) | Fr | Adelaide Lightning | Adelaide, Australia |
| F | 14 | Bella Cravens | 6 ft 3 in (1.91 m) | Jr | Maryknoll School; Eastern Washington | Laie, HI |
| F | 21 | Annika Stewart | 6 ft 3 in (1.91 m) | Fr | Wayzata | Minneapolis, MN |
| G | 24 | Nailah Dillard | 5 ft 9 in (1.75 m) | So | Inderkum; Texas Tech | Sacramento, CA |
| C | 31 | Kate Cain | 6 ft 5 in (1.96 m) | Sr | Pine Bush | Middletown, NY |
| G/F | 32 | Kendall Coley | 6 ft 2 in (1.88 m) | Fr | St. Louis Park | Minneapolis, MN |
| F | 34 | Isabelle Bourne | 6 ft 2 in (1.88 m) | So | Australian Institute of Sport | Canberra, Australia |

Head coach

- Amy Williams (Nebraska)

Assistant coach(es)

- Tom Goehle (Augustana (SD))
- Chuck Love (Northwestern Oklahoma State)
- Tandem Mays (Tulsa)

Legend

- (C) Team captain
- (S) Suspended
- (I) Ineligible
- (W) Walk-on
- Injured
- Current redshirt

Roster
Last update: June 28, 2021

== Schedule ==
| Date time, TV | Rank^{#} | Opponent^{#} | Result | Record | Site (attendance) city, state |
Regular season
| December 4, 2020*; 6:00 p.m., BTN+ | | Oral Roberts | W 90–61 | 1–0 | Pinnacle Bank Arena (20); Lincoln, NE |
| December 6, 2020*; 5:00 p.m., BTN+ | | Idaho State | W 64–51 | 2–0 | Pinnacle Bank Arena (20); Lincoln, NE |
| December 10, 2020; 7:00 p.m., BTN | | Illinois | W 78–72 | 3–0 (1–0) | Pinnacle Bank Arena (0); Lincoln, NE |
| December 14, 2020*; 5:00 p.m. | | at Creighton | L 62–78 | 3–1 | CHI Health Center Omaha (159); Omaha, NE |
| December 20, 2020; 3:00 p.m., BTN | | at No. 15 Indiana | L 45–81 | 3–2 (1–1) | Simon Skjodt Assembly Hall (0); Bloomington, IN |
| December 23, 2020; 1:00 p.m., BTN | | at Purdue | L 72–83 | 3–3 (1–2) | Mackey Arena (161); West Lafayette, IN |
| December 31, 2020; 1:00 p.m., BTN | | No. 15 Northwestern | W 65–63 | 4–3 (2–2) | Pinnacle Bank Arena (0); Lincoln, NE |
| January 3, 2021; 2:00 p.m., BTN+ | | Rutgers | W 53–50 | 5–3 (3–2) | Pinnacle Bank Arena (0); Lincoln, NE |
| January 7, 2021; 5:00 p.m., BTN+ | | at No. 15 Michigan | L 62–64 | 5–4 (3–3) | Crisler Center (29); Ann Arbor, MI |
| January 10, 2021; 2:00 p.m., BTN+ | | at No. 23 Michigan State | W 68–64 | 6–4 (4–3) | Breslin Center (0); East Lansing, MI |
| January 16, 2021; 4:00 p.m., BTN | | No. 15 Ohio State | W 63–55 | 7–4 (5–3) | Pinnacle Bank Arena (0); Lincoln, NE |
| January 19, 2021; 3:00 p.m., BTN | | Minnesota | L 71–76 | 7–5 (5–4) | Pinnacle Bank Arena (0); Lincoln, NE |
| January 25, 2021; 7:00 p.m., BTN | | at Illinois | W 57–53 | 8–5 (6–4) | State Farm Center (0); Champaign, IL |
| January 28, 2021; 7:00 p.m., BTN+ | | Wisconsin | W 84–68 | 9–5 (7–4) | Pinnacle Bank Arena (0); Lincoln, NE |
| February 4, 2021; 5:00 p.m., BTN+ | | at Penn State | L 74–85 | 9–6 (7–5) | Bryce Jordan Center (175); University Park |
| February 7, 2021; 1:00 p.m., BTN+ | | at Rutgers | L 62–78 | 9–7 (7–6) | Louis Brown Athletic Center (0); Piscataway, NJ |
| February 11, 2021; 7:00 p.m., BTN | | Iowa | L 81–88 | 9–8 (7–7) | Pinnacle Bank Arena (0); Lincoln, NE |
| February 14, 2021; 4:00 p.m., FS1 | | No. 9 Maryland | L 73–95 | 9–9 (7–8) | Pinnacle Bank Arena (0); Lincoln, NE |
| February 24, 2021; 6:00 p.m., BTN+ | | at No. 24 Northwestern | W 71–64 | 10–9 (8–8) | Welsh–Ryan Arena (0); Evanston, IL |
| February 21, 2021; 2:00 p.m., BTN+ | | Penn State | W 87–72 | 11–9 (9–8) | Pinnacle Bank Arena (0); Lincoln, NE |
| February 24, 2021; 6:00 p.m., BTN+ | | at Minnesota | L 63–73 | 11–10 (9–9) | Williams Arena (0); Minneapolis, MN |
| February 27, 2021; 1:00 p.m., BTN+ | | Michigan State | Canceled | | Pinnacle Bank Arena; Lincoln, NE |
| March 6, 2021; 7:00 p.m., BTN+ | | at Iowa | L 75–83 | 11–11 (9–10) | Carver–Hawkeye Arena (301); Iowa City, IA |
Big Ten Women's Tournament
| March 10, 2021; 10:00 a.m., BTN | (8) | vs. (9) Minnesota; Second Round | W 72–61 | 12–11 | Bankers Life Fieldhouse (716); Indianapolis, IN |
| March 11, 2021; 10:00 a.m., FS2 | (8) | vs. (1) No. 7 Maryland; Quarterfinals | L 73–83 | 12–12 | Bankers Life Fieldhouse (779); Indianapolis, IN |
WNIT
| March 19, 2021; 11:00 a.m., FloHoops | | vs. UT Martin; First Round | W 72–46 | 13–12 | My Town Movers Fieldhouse (300); Collierville, TN |
| March 20, 2021; 5:00 p.m., FloHoops | | vs. Colorado; Second Round | L 71–75 | 13–13 | My Town Movers Fieldhouse (300); Collierville, TN |
*Non-conference game. ^{#}Rankings from AP Poll. (#) Tournament seedings in parentheses. All times are in CST Time.

== Rankings ==
Regular season polls
| Poll | Pre- season | Week 2 | Week 3 | Week 4 | Week 5 | Week 6 | Week 7 | Week 8 | Week 9 | Week 10 | Week 11 | Week 12 | Week 13 | Week 14 | Week 15 | Week 16 | Final |
|---|---|---|---|---|---|---|---|---|---|---|---|---|---|---|---|---|---|
| AP | | | | | | | | | | | | | | | | | |
| Coaches | | | | | | | | | | | | | | | | | |

Legend
| | Increase in ranking |
| | Decrease in ranking |
| | Not ranked previous week |
| (RV) | Received votes |
| (NR) | Not ranked and did not receive votes |

The Coaches Poll did not release a Week 2 poll, and the AP Poll did not release a poll after the NCAA Tournament.

== See also ==
- 2020–21 Nebraska Cornhuskers men's basketball team
