= Amy Williams (basketball) =

American basketball coach

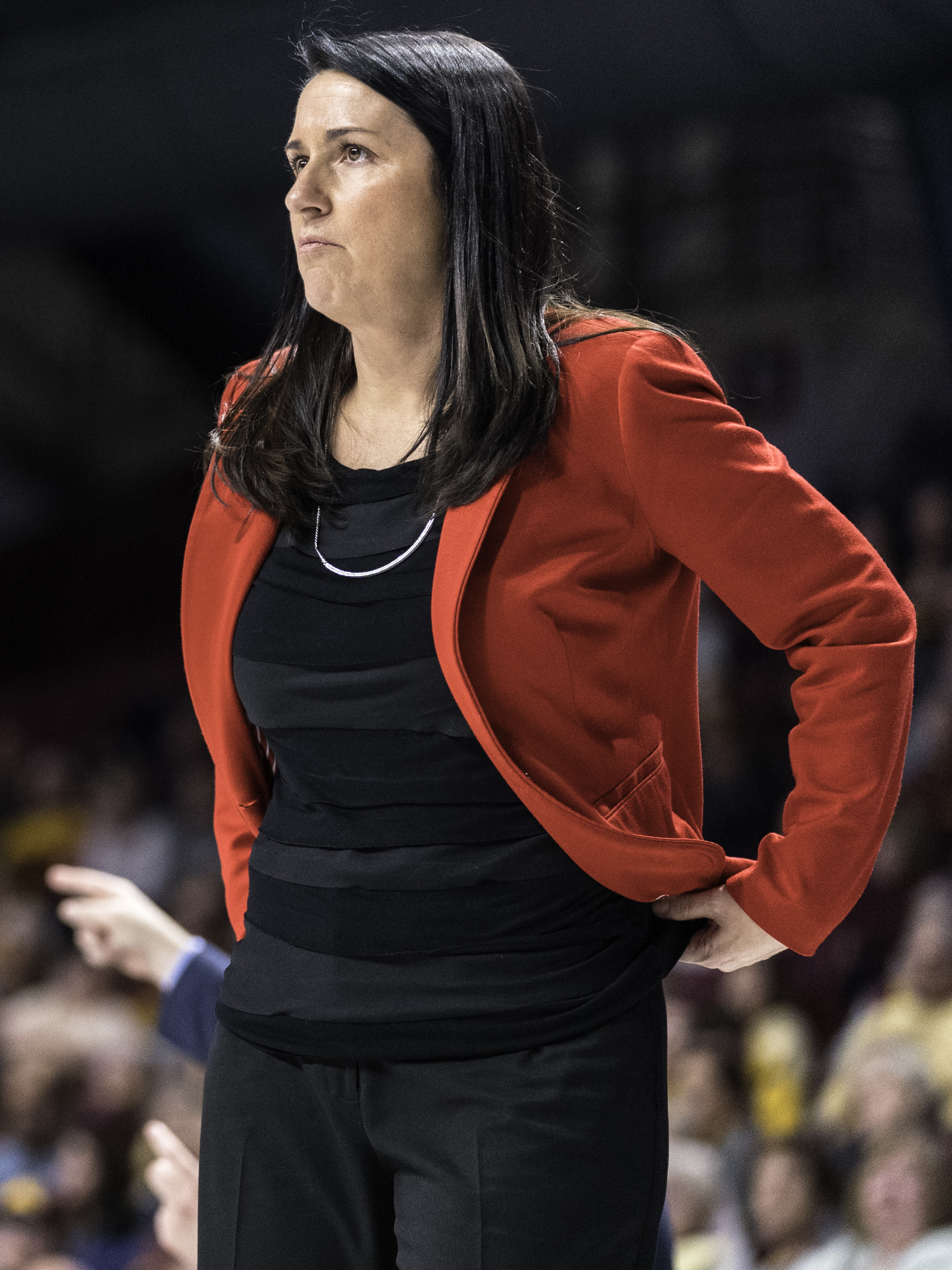
- Williams in 2020

Current position
- Title: Head coach
- Team: Nebraska
- Conference: Big Ten
- Record: 183–136 (.574)

Biographical details
- Born: August 19, 1976 (age 50); Spearfish, South Dakota, U.S.

Playing career
- 1994–1998: Nebraska
- Position: Guard

Coaching career (HC unless noted)
- 1998–2000: Nebraska–Kearney (GA)
- 2000–2001: UTSA (asst.)
- 2001–2005: Oklahoma State (asst.)
- 2005–2007: Tulsa (asst.)
- 2007–2012: Rogers State
- 2012–2016: South Dakota
- 2016–present: Nebraska

Head coaching record
- Overall: 376–245 (.605)
- Tournaments: 2–5 (NCAA); 8–2 (WNIT); 2–1 (WBI); 2–2 (NAIA)

Accomplishments and honors

Championships
- WNIT (2016); 2× Summit League regular season (2015, 2016); Summit League Tournament (2014)

Awards
- 2× Summit League Coach of the Year (2015, 2016); Big Ten Coach of the Year (2018)

Amy Michelle Williams (née Gusso; born March 22, 1976) is the current head coach of the Nebraska women's basketball team. She was previously the head coach at the University of South Dakota, and led the Coyotes to the 2016 WNIT championship.

== Early life and education ==
Born Amy Michelle Gusso in Spearfish, South Dakota, Williams graduated from Spearfish High School in 1993 and played 57 games as a reserve guard for the Nebraska Cornhuskers women's basketball team at the University of Nebraska–Lincoln from 1994 to 1998. Williams graduated from Nebraska in 1998 with a bachelor's degree in biology and mathematics.

== Coaching career ==
From 1998 to 2000, Williams was a graduate assistant for the University of Nebraska at Kearney women's basketball team while studying for her master's degree in sports administration, which she completed in 2002. Williams was an assistant coach at UTSA in the 2000–01 season then at Oklahoma State from 2001 to 2005. From 2005 to 2007, Williams was an assistant at Tulsa. Williams helped Tulsa win the program's first regular season and tournament titles in Conference USA and NCAA tournament appearance in 2006.

Williams got her first head coaching job as the first women's basketball head coach at Rogers State University, an NAIA school in Claremore, Oklahoma, in 2007. In five seasons, Williams accumulated a 97–65 record and two NAIA Tournament appearances in 2011 and 2012 for the upstart Hillcats program.

In 2012, Williams returned to the NCAA Division I level as head coach at South Dakota. Williams went 96–44 in four seasons, all of which ended with postseason appearances, including the 2013 WBI semifinals, 2014 NCAA Tournament first round, and 2015 WNIT second round. The 2015–16 South Dakota team went 32–6 and won the 2016 WNIT.

On April 11, 2016, the University of Nebraska–Lincoln hired Williams as head women's basketball coach.

== Head coaching record ==
Record table
Season	Team	Overall	Conference	Standing	Postseason
Rogers State Hillcats (Sooner Athletic Conference) (2007–2012)
2007–08	Rogers State	13–18	9–13	T–7th	
2008–09	Rogers State	18–14	11–11	6th	
2009–10	Rogers State	21–11	12–10	T–4th	
2010–11	Rogers State	23–10	15–7	4th	NAIA First Round
2011–12	Rogers State	22–12	14–8	4th	NAIA Quarterfinals
Rogers State:		97–65 (.599)	61–49 (.555)		
South Dakota Coyotes (Summit League) (2012–2016)
2012–13	South Dakota	19–16	10–6	3rd	WBI Third Round
2013–14	South Dakota	19–14	7–7	4th	NCAA First Round
2014–15	South Dakota	26–8	13–3	1st	WNIT Second Round
2015–16	South Dakota	32–6	15–1	1st	WNIT Champions
South Dakota:		96–44 (.686)	45–17 (.726)		
Nebraska Cornhuskers (Big Ten Conference) (2016–present)
2016–17	Nebraska	7–22	3–13	T–11th	
2017–18	Nebraska	21–11	11–5	T–3rd	NCAA First Round
2018–19	Nebraska	14–16	9–9	T–6th	
2019–20	Nebraska	17–13	7–11	10th	Not held due to the COVID-19 pandemic
2020–21	Nebraska	13–13	9–10	9th	WNIT Second Round
2021–22	Nebraska	24–9	11–7	6th	NCAA First Round
2022–23	Nebraska	18–15	8–10	8th	WNIT Super Sixteen
2023–24	Nebraska	23–12	11–7	5th	NCAA Second Round
2024–25	Nebraska	21–12	10–8	T–8th	NCAA First Round
2025–26	Nebraska	19–13	7–11	12th	NCAA First Round
2026–27	Nebraska	6-0			
Nebraska:		183–136 (.574)	86–91 (.486)		
Total:		376–245 (.605)			
National champion Postseason invitational champion Conference regular season champion Conference regular season and conference tournament champion Division regular season champion Division regular season and conference tournament champion Conference tournament champion
