= 2020–21 Michigan State Spartans women's basketball team =

Intercollegiate basketball season

2020–21 Michigan State Spartans women's basketball

NCAA tournament, first round
- Conference: Big Ten Conference
- Record: 15–9 (8–7 Big Ten)
- Head coach: Suzy Merchant (14th season)
- Assistant coaches: Dean Lockwood; Maria Fantanarosa; Kristin Haynie
- Home arena: Breslin Center

2020–21 Big Ten women's basketball standings
	Conf.				Overall
Team	W		L	PCT	W		L	PCT
No. 7 Maryland †	17	–	1	.944	26	–	2	.929
No. 12 Indiana	16	–	2	.889	20	–	5	.800
No. 21 Rutgers	10	–	3	.769	14	–	5	.737
No. 16 Michigan	9	–	4	.692	16	–	6	.727
Northwestern	11	–	7	.611	16	–	9	.640
Iowa	11	–	8	.579	20	–	9	.690
No. 22 Ohio State	9	–	7	.563	13	–	7	.650
Michigan State	8	–	7	.533	15	–	9	.625
Nebraska	9	–	10	.474	13	–	13	.500
Minnesota	7	–	11	.389	8	–	13	.381
Penn State	6	–	13	.316	9	–	15	.375
Purdue	4	–	14	.222	7	–	16	.304
Illinois	2	–	16	.111	5	–	18	.217
Wisconsin	2	–	18	.100	5	–	19	.208
† 2021 Big Ten tournament winner As of March 27, 2021; Rankings from AP poll

The 2020–21 Michigan State Spartans women's basketball team represented Michigan State University during the 2020–21 NCAA Division I women's basketball season. The Spartans, led by fourteenth-year head coach Suzy Merchant, played their home games at the Breslin Center in East Lansing, Michigan as members of the Big Ten Conference.

They finished the season 15–9, 8–7 in Big Ten play to finish in eighth place. As the seventh seed in the Big Ten tournament, they defeated Penn State in the second round and Indiana in the quarterfinals before losing to Iowa in the semifinals. They received an at-large bid to the NCAA tournament, where they were the ten seed in the Mercado Regional. They lost in the first round to seven seed Iowa State to end their season.

== Previous season ==
The Spartans finished the season 16–14, 9–9 in Big Ten play to finish in eighth place. In the Big Ten tournament, they lost to Purdue in the first round. They did not get a chance for further post-season play, as the NCAA women's basketball tournament and WNIT were cancelled before they began, due to the COVID-19 pandemic.

== Roster ==
2020–21 Michigan State Spartans women's basketball team
Players
Coaches

Pos.	#	Name	Height	Year	Previous school	Hometown
G/F	1	Tory Ozment	6 ft 1 in (1.85 m)	Jr	Buford	Buford, GA
F	2	Mardrekia Cook	6 ft 0 in (1.83 m)	RS Sr	Muskegon	Muskegon, MI
G	3	Alyza Winston	5 ft 7 in (1.7 m)	So	Muskegon	Muskegon, MI
F	4	Alisia Smith	6 ft 3 in (1.91 m)	Sr	Waverly; Penn State	Lansing, MI
G	5	Claire Hendrickson	5 ft 11 in (1.8 m)	RS Jr	Wyoming	Wyoming, MI
C	12	Lauren Rewers	6 ft 4 in (1.93 m)	GS	Lake City; Hawaii	Coeur d'Alene, ID
F	14	Taiyier Parks	6 ft 3 in (1.91 m)	So	North Royalton	Cleveland, OH
F	20	Jayla James	6 ft 1 in (1.85 m)	RS So	Riverdale Baptist; Penn State	Upper Marlboro, MD
G	21	Laurel Jacqmain	5 ft 8 in (1.73 m)	RS Sr	Nouvel Catholic	Saginaw, MI
G	22	Moira Joiner	5 ft 10 in (1.78 m)	So	Heritage	Saginaw, MI
G	23	Janai Crooms	5 ft 10 in (1.78 m)	Jr	St. Andrew's; Ohio State	Cranston, RI
G	24	Nia Clouden	5 ft 8 in (1.73 m)	Jr	St. Frances	Owings Mills, MD
G	40	Julia Ayrault	6 ft 2 in (1.88 m)	So	Grosse Pointe North	Grosse Pointe Woods, MI
F	44	Kendall Bostic	6 ft 2 in (1.88 m)	Fr	Northwestern	Kokomo, IN
C	50	Cyndi Dodd	6 ft 5 in (1.96 m)	So	Warren Central	Indianapolis, IN

Head coach

- Suzy Merchant (Central Michigan)

Assistant coach(es)

- Dean Lockwood (Spring Arbor)
- Maria Fantanarosa (Miami (OH))
- Kristin Haynie (Michigan State)

Legend

- (C) Team captain
- (S) Suspended
- (I) Ineligible
- (W) Walk-on
- Injured
- Current redshirt

Roster
Last update: June 24, 2021

== Schedule and results ==
Date time, TV	Rank^{#}	Opponent^{#}	Result	Record	Site (attendance) city, state
Regular season
November 27, 2020*; 3:00 p.m., BTN+		Saint Francis	W 77–44	1–0	Breslin Center (0); East Lansing, MI
December 2, 2020*; 7:00 p.m., BTN+		Detroit Mercy	W 82–45	2–0	Breslin Center (0); East Lansing, MI
December 9, 2020; 9:00 p.m., BTN		at Minnesota	W 81–68	3–0 (1–0)	Williams Arena (0); Minneapolis, MN
December 12, 2020; 4:00 p.m., BTN+		Iowa	W 86–82	4–0 (2–0)	Breslin Center (0); East Lansing, MI
December 18, 2020*; 5:00 p.m., BTN+		Central Michigan	W 79–70	5–0	Breslin Center (0); East Lansing, MI
December 20, 2020*; 3:00 p.m., BTN+		Northern Illinois	W 82–70	6–0	Breslin Center (0); East Lansing, MI
December 22, 2020*; Noon, BTN+	No. 25	Oakland	W 94–56	7–0	Breslin Center (0); East Lansing, MI
December 31, 2020; Noon, BTN	No. 25	at No. 17 Ohio State	Canceled		Value City Arena; Columbus, OH
January 3, 2021; 2:00 p.m., BTN+	No. 25	at Purdue	W 71–64	8–0 (3–0)	Mackey Arena (152); West Lafayette, IN
January 7, 2021; 5:00 p.m., BTN	No. 23	No. 12 Maryland	L 87–93	8–1 (3–1)	Breslin Center (50); East Lansing, MI
January 10, 2021; 3:00 p.m., BTN+	No. 23	Nebraska	L 64–68	8–2 (3–2)	Breslin Center (0); East Lansing, MI
January 14, 2021; 7:00 p.m., BTN+		at Illinois	Postponed		State Farm Center; Champaign, IL
January 21, 2021; 6:00 p.m., BTN		No. 16 Indiana	Postponed		Breslin Center; East Lansing, MI
January 24, 2021; 4:00 p.m., BTN		at Wisconsin	W 94–62	9–2 (4–2)	Kohl Center (0); Madison, WI
January 26, 2021; 7:00 p.m., BTN		No. 12 Michigan; Rivalry	Postponed		Breslin Center; East Lansing, MI
January 28, 2021; 4:00 p.m., BTN		at No. 7 Maryland	L 52–92	9–3 (4–3)	Xfinity Center (0); College Park, MD
January 28, 2021; 7:00 p.m., BTN+		at No. 12 Michigan; Rivalry	Postponed		Crisler Center; Ann Arbor, MI
January 31, 2021; 4:30 p.m., BTN		at No. 16 Indiana	L 67–79	9–4 (4–4)	Simon Skjodt Assembly Hall (0); Bloomington, IN
February 4, 2021; 8:00 p.m., BTN		Illinois	W 81–60	10–4 (5–4)	Breslin Center (0); East Lansing, MI
February 7, 2021; 3:00 p.m., BTN+		No. 22 Northwestern	L 60–63	10–5 (5–5)	Breslin Center (0); East Lansing, MI
February 13, 2021; Noon, BTN		at Penn State	W 78–65	11–5 (6–5)	Bryce Jordan Center (209); University Park
February 16, 2021; 4:30 p.m., BTN		at No. 11 Michigan; Rivalry	L 82–86	11–6 (6–6)	Crisler Center (50); Ann Arbor, MI
February 21, 2021; 11:30 a.m., FS1		Purdue	W 76–73	12–6 (7–6)	Breslin Center (51); East Lansing, MI
February 24, 2021; 3:00 p.m., BTN		No. 25 Rutgers	L 53–63	12–7 (7–7)	Breslin Center (36); East Lansing, MI
February 27, 2021; 2:00 p.m., BTN+		at Nebraska	Canceled		Pinnacle Bank Arena; Lincoln, NE
March 6, 2021; 2:00 p.m., BTN+		Wisconsin	W 67–54	13–7 (8–7)	Breslin Center (0); East Lansing, MI
Big Ten tournament
March 10, 2021; 6:30 p.m., FS2	(7)	vs. (10) Penn State; Second Round	W 75–66	14–7	Bankers Life Fieldhouse (1,064); Indianapolis, IN
March 11, 2021; 6:30 p.m., FS2	(7)	vs. (2) No. 9 Indiana; Quarterfinals	W 69–61	15–7	Bankers Life Fieldhouse (0); Indianapolis, IN
March 12, 2021; 4:30 p.m., FS2	(7)	vs. (6) Iowa; Semifinals	L 72–87	15–8	Bankers Life Fieldhouse (0); Indianapolis, IN
NCAA tournament
March 22, 2021*; 6:00 p.m., ESPN	(10 M)	vs. (7 M) Iowa State; First Round	L 75–79	15–9	Alamodome (0); San Antonio, TX
*Non-conference game. ^{#}Rankings from AP Poll. (#) Tournament seedings in parentheses. M=Mercado Region. All times are in Eastern Time.

== Rankings ==
Regular season polls
Poll	Pre- season	Week 2	Week 3	Week 4	Week 5	Week 6	Week 7	Week 8	Week 9	Week 10	Week 11	Week 12	Week 13	Week 14	Week 15	Week 16	Final
AP				RV	25	25	23	RV									
Coaches			RV	RV	RV	24	RV	RV	RV		RV	RV					RV

Legend
	Increase in ranking
	Decrease in ranking
	Not ranked previous week
(RV)	Received votes
(NR)	Not ranked and did not receive votes

The Coaches Poll did not release a Week 2 poll, and the AP Poll did not release a poll after the NCAA Tournament.

== See also ==
- 2020–21 Michigan State Spartans men's basketball team
