= 2021 Big Ten women's basketball tournament =

- Classification: Division I
- Season: 2020–21
- Teams: 13
- Site: Bankers Life Fieldhouse; Indianapolis, IN
- Champions: Maryland (5th title)
- Winning coach: Brenda Frese (5th title)
- MVP: Diamond Miller (Maryland)
- Television: BTN, FS2, ESPNU

2020–21 Big Ten women's basketball standings
	Conf.				Overall
Team	W		L	PCT	W		L	PCT
No. 7 Maryland †	17	–	1	.944	26	–	2	.929
No. 12 Indiana	16	–	2	.889	20	–	5	.800
No. 21 Rutgers	10	–	3	.769	14	–	5	.737
No. 16 Michigan	9	–	4	.692	16	–	6	.727
Northwestern	11	–	7	.611	16	–	9	.640
Iowa	11	–	8	.579	20	–	9	.690
No. 22 Ohio State	9	–	7	.563	13	–	7	.650
Michigan State	8	–	7	.533	15	–	9	.625
Nebraska	9	–	10	.474	13	–	13	.500
Minnesota	7	–	11	.389	8	–	13	.381
Penn State	6	–	13	.316	9	–	15	.375
Purdue	4	–	14	.222	7	–	16	.304
Illinois	2	–	16	.111	5	–	18	.217
Wisconsin	2	–	18	.100	5	–	19	.208
† 2021 Big Ten tournament winner As of March 27, 2021; Rankings from AP poll

The 2021 Big Ten women's basketball tournament was a postseason tournament held from March 9–13, 2021 at Bankers Life Fieldhouse in Indianapolis. The winner of this tournament, Maryland earned an automatic bid to the 2021 NCAA Division I women's basketball tournament.

== Seeds ==
Only 13 out of the 14 Big Ten schools participated in the tournament. Ohio State did not compete this year due to a self-imposed postseason ban. Teams were seeded by 2020–21 Big Ten Conference season record. The top 11 teams received a first-round bye and the top four teams received a double bye.

Seed	School	Conf	Tiebreaker
1	Maryland^{‡##}	17–1	
2	Indiana^{##}	16–2	
3	Rutgers^{##}	10–3	
4	Michigan^{##}	9–4	
5	Northwestern^{#}	11–7	
6	Iowa^{#}	11–8	
7	Michigan State^{#}	7–7	
8	Nebraska^{#}	9–10	
9	Minnesota^{#}	7–11	
10	Penn State^{#}	6–12	
11	Purdue^{#}	4–14	
12	Illinois	2–16	
13	Wisconsin	2–17	
‡ – Big Ten Conference regular season champions. ## – Received a double bye in the conference tournament. # – Received a first-round bye in the conference tournament. Overall record are as of the end of the regular season.

== Schedule ==
Game	Time	Matchup	Score	Television	Attendance
First round – Tuesday, March 9
1	5:00 pm	No. 12 Illinois vs. No. 13 Wisconsin	67−42	BTN	460
Second round – Wednesday, March 10
2	11:00 am	No. 8 Nebraska vs. No. 9 Minnesota	72−61	BTN	716
3	25 min. after game 2	No. 5 Northwestern vs. No. 12 Illinois	67−42	BTN	716
4	6:30 pm	No. 7 Michigan State vs. No. 10 Penn State	75−66	FS2	1,064
5	25 min. after game 4	No. 6 Iowa vs. No. 11 Purdue	83−72	FS2	1,064
Quarterfinals – Thursday, March 11
6	11:00 am	No. 1 Maryland vs. No. 8 Nebraska	83−73	FS2	779
7	25 min. after game 6	No. 4 Michigan vs. No. 5 Northwestern	49−65	FS2	779
8	6:30 pm	No. 2 Indiana vs. No. 7 Michigan State	61−69	FS2	
9	25 min. after game 8	No. 3 Rutgers vs. No. 6 Iowa	62−73	FS2	
Semifinals – Friday, March 12
10	2:00 pm	No. 1 Maryland vs. No. 5 Northwestern	85−52	FS2	
11	25 min. after game 10	No. 6 Iowa vs. No. 7 Michigan State	87−72	FS2	
Championship – Saturday, March 13
12	2:00 pm	No. 1 Maryland vs. No. 6 Iowa	104−84	ESPNU	1,202
Game times in Eastern Time. Rankings denote tournament seeding.

== Bracket ==
- All times are Eastern.

First round Tuesday, March 9 BTN
12	Illinois	67
13	Wisconsin	42

Second round Wednesday, March 10; BTN/FS2
8	Nebraska	72
9	Minnesota	61
5	Northwestern	67
12	Illinois	42
7	Michigan State	75
10	Penn State	66
6	Iowa	83
11	Purdue	72

Quarterfinals; Thursday, March 11; FS2
1	Maryland	83
8	Nebraska	73
4	Michigan	49
5	Northwestern	65
2	Indiana	61
7	Michigan State	69
3	Rutgers	62
6	Iowa	73

Semifinals; Friday, March 12; FS2
1	Maryland	85
5	Northwestern	52
7	Michigan State	72
6	Iowa	87

Championship; Saturday, March 13; ESPNU
1	Maryland	104
6	Iowa	84

* denotes overtime period
