= 2020–21 Rutgers Scarlet Knights women's basketball team =

Intercollegiate basketball season

2020–21 Rutgers Scarlet Knights women's basketball

NCAA tournament, first round
- Conference: Big Ten Conference

Ranking
- AP: No. 21
- Record: 14–5 (10–3 Big Ten)
- Head coach: C. Vivian Stringer (26th season)
- Assistant coaches: Timothy Eatman; Nadine Domond; Michelle Edwards
- Home arena: Louis Brown Athletic Center

2020–21 Big Ten women's basketball standings
	Conf.				Overall
Team	W		L	PCT	W		L	PCT
No. 7 Maryland †	17	–	1	.944	26	–	2	.929
No. 12 Indiana	16	–	2	.889	20	–	5	.800
No. 21 Rutgers	10	–	3	.769	14	–	5	.737
No. 16 Michigan	9	–	4	.692	16	–	6	.727
Northwestern	11	–	7	.611	16	–	9	.640
Iowa	11	–	8	.579	20	–	9	.690
No. 22 Ohio State	9	–	7	.563	13	–	7	.650
Michigan State	8	–	7	.533	15	–	9	.625
Nebraska	9	–	10	.474	13	–	13	.500
Minnesota	7	–	11	.389	8	–	13	.381
Penn State	6	–	13	.316	9	–	15	.375
Purdue	4	–	14	.222	7	–	16	.304
Illinois	2	–	16	.111	5	–	18	.217
Wisconsin	2	–	18	.100	5	–	19	.208
† 2021 Big Ten tournament winner As of March 27, 2021; Rankings from AP poll

The 2020–21 Rutgers Scarlet Knights women's basketball team represented Rutgers University during the 2020–21 NCAA Division I women's basketball season. The Scarlet Knights, led by 26th-year head coach C. Vivian Stringer, played their home games at the Louis Brown Athletic Center, better known as The RAC, as a member of the Big Ten Conference.

They finished the season 14–5, 10–3 in Big Ten play to finish in third place. They received a double-bye into the quarterfinals of the Big Ten women's tournament, where they lost to Iowa. They received an at-large bid to the NCAA tournament. As the six seed in the Mercado Regional, they lost to BYU in the first round to end their season.

== Previous season ==
The Scarlet Knights finished the season 22–8, 11–7 in Big Ten play to finish in fifth place. They advanced to the quarterfinals of the Big Ten women's tournament, where they lost to Indiana. They did not get a chance for further post-season play, as the NCAA women's basketball tournament and WNIT were cancelled before they began, due to the COVID-19 pandemic.

== Roster ==
2020–21 Rutgers Scarlet Knights women's basketball team
Players
Coaches

Pos.	#	Name	Height	Year	Previous school	Hometown
G	1	Zipporah Broughton	5 ft 7 in (1.7 m)	Jr	Robert E. Lee	Wetumpka, AL
G	2	Liz Martino	6 ft 0 in (1.83 m)	Fr	Riverdale Baptist	Lanham, MD
G	3	Diamond Johnson	5 ft 5 in (1.65 m)	Fr	Neumann Goretti	Philadelphia, PA
G	4	Destiny Marshall	5 ft 10 in (1.78 m)	RS Jr	Grovetown; Jacksonville	Augusta, GA
G/F	10	Erica LaFayette	6 ft 0 in (1.83 m)	Fr	McKinley	Baton Rouge, LA
G	11	Stephanie Guihon	5 ft 6 in (1.68 m)	RS Jr	Largo	Largo, MD
C	12	Sakima Walker	6 ft 4 in (1.93 m)	Fr	Africentric Early College	Columbus, OH
F	13	Mael Gilles	6 ft 1 in (1.85 m)	Sr	Montmorency	Montréal-Nord, Quebec
C	15	Aicha Ndour	6 ft 6 in (1.98 m)	Fr	Cushing Academy	Somone, Senegal
G	20	Joiya Maddox	5 ft 10 in (1.78 m)	So	Hoover	Hoover, AL
F	22	Tyia Singleton	6 ft 2 in (1.88 m)	RS So	Winter Haven	Winter Haven, FL
G	24	Arella Guirantes	5 ft 11 in (1.8 m)	RS Sr	Bellport; Texas Tech	Bellport, NY
G/F	31	Tekia Mack	6 ft 1 in (1.85 m)	Sr	Marshall	Chicago, IL
F	54	Chyna Cornwell	6 ft 3 in (1.91 m)	Fr	Newton-Conover	Conover, NC

Head coach

- C. Vivian Stringer (Slippery Rock)

Assistant coach(es)

- Timothy Eatman (Talladega)
- Nadine Domond (Iowa)
- Michelle Edwards (Iowa)

Legend

- (C) Team captain
- (S) Suspended
- (I) Ineligible
- (W) Walk-on
- Injured
- Current redshirt

Roster
Last update: June 17, 2021

== Schedule ==
Date time, TV	Rank^{#}	Opponent^{#}	Result	Record	Site (attendance) city, state
Regular season
November 27, 2020*; 11:00 a.m., BTN+		Monmouth	W 82–38	1–0	Louis Brown Athletic Center (0); Piscataway, NJ
December 11, 2020; 4:30 p.m., BTN		at Wisconsin	W 70–65	2–0 (1–0)	Kohl Center (0); Madison, WI
December 14, 2020; 2:00 p.m., BTN+		No. 14 Maryland	L 87–91	2–1 (1–1)	Louis Brown Athletic Center (0); Piscataway, NJ
December 18, 2020*; Noon, BTN+		Hampton	W 94–45	3–1	Louis Brown Athletic Center (0); Piscataway, NJ
December 20, 2020*; 8:00 p.m., BTN+		Sacred Heart	W 99–30	4–1	Louis Brown Athletic Center (0); Piscataway, NJ
December 23, 2020*; Noon, BTN+		Manhattan	W 84–41	5–1	Louis Brown Athletic Center (0); Piscataway, NJ
December 31, 2020; 3:00 p.m., BTN+		at Iowa	L 84–90	5–2 (1–2)	Carver–Hawkeye Arena (328); Iowa City, IA
January 3, 2021; 3:00 p.m., BTN+		at Nebraska	L 50–53	5–3 (1–3)	Pinnacle Bank Arena (0); Lincoln, NE
January 7, 2021; 7:00 p.m., BTN		Purdue	Postponed		Louis Brown Athletic Center; Piscataway, NJ
January 10, 2021; 2:00 p.m., ESPNU		at Ohio State	Postponed		Value City Arena; Columbus, OH
January 14, 2021		No. 22 Northwestern	Postponed		Louis Brown Athletic Center; Piscataway, NJ
January 24, 2021; 4:00 p.m., BTN		Iowa	Postponed		Louis Brown Athletic Center; Piscataway, NJ
January 28, 2021		at No. 7 Maryland	Postponed		Xfinity Center; College Park, MD
February 1, 2021		No. 13 Michigan	Postponed		Louis Brown Athletic Center; Piscataway, NJ
February 4, 2021; 8:00 p.m., BTN		at No. 17 Indiana	Postponed		Simon Skjodt Assembly Hall; Bloomington, IN
February 7, 2021; 2:00 p.m., BTN+		Nebraska	W 78–62	6–3 (2–3)	Louis Brown Athletic Center (0); Piscataway, NJ
February 11, 2021; 4:00 p.m., BTN		at No. 21 Northwestern	W 70–54	7–3 (3–3)	Welsh–Ryan Arena (0); Evanston, IL
February 14, 2021; 2:00 p.m., BTN+		at Purdue	W 75–57	8–3 (4–3)	Mackey Arena (161); West Lafayette, IN
February 17, 2021; 7:00 p.m., BTN+		Minnesota	W 83–56	9–3 (5–3)	Louis Brown Athletic Center (0); Piscataway, NJ
February 20, 2021; Noon, BTN		Illinois	W 75–46	10–3 (6–3)	Louis Brown Athletic Center (0); Piscataway, NJ
February 24, 2021; 3:00 p.m., BTN	No. 25	at Michigan State	W 63–53	11–3 (7–3)	Breslin Center (36); East Lansing, MI
February 28, 2021; 12:30 p.m., BTN	No. 25	at Penn State	W 60–55	12–3 (8–3)	Bryce Jordan Center (221); University Park, PA
March 2, 2021; 5:30 p.m., BTN	No. 24	Penn State	W 74–56	13–3 (9–3)	Louis Brown Athletic Center (60); Piscataway, NJ
March 5, 2021; 8:00 p.m., ESPN	No. 24	No. 22 Ohio State	W 71–63	14–3 (10–3)	Louis Brown Athletic Center (108); Piscataway, NJ
Big Ten Women's Tournament
March 11, 2021; 9:00 p.m., FS2	(3) No. 19	vs. (6) Iowa; Quarterfinals	L 62–73	14–4	Bankers Life Fieldhouse (0); Indianapolis, IN
NCAA tournament
March 22, 2021; Noon, ESPNU	(6) No. 21	vs. (11) BYU; First Round	L 66–69	14–5	Strahan Arena (0); San Marcos, TX
*Non-conference game. ^{#}Rankings from AP Poll. (#) Tournament seedings in parentheses. All times are in Eastern Time.

== Rankings ==
Regular season polls
Poll	Pre- season	Week 2	Week 3	Week 4	Week 5	Week 6	Week 7	Week 8	Week 9	Week 10	Week 11	Week 12	Week 13	Week 14	Week 15	Week 16	Final
AP	RV	RV		RV	RV	RV							RV	25	24	19	21
Coaches	RV	RV	RV	RV	RV							RV	RV	RV	23	23	RV

Legend
	Increase in ranking
	Decrease in ranking
	Not ranked previous week
(RV)	Received votes
(NR)	Not ranked and did not receive votes

The Coaches Poll did not release a Week 2 poll, and the AP Poll did not release a poll after the NCAA Tournament.

== See also ==
- 2020–21 Rutgers Scarlet Knights men's basketball team
