= 2020–21 Indiana Hoosiers women's basketball team =

Intercollegiate basketball season

2020–21 Indiana Hoosiers women's basketball

NCAA tournament, Elite Eight
- Conference: Big Ten Conference

Ranking
- Coaches: No. 10
- AP: No. 12
- Record: 21-5 (16–2 Big Ten)
- Head coach: Teri Moren (7th season)
- Assistant coaches: Rhet Wierzba; Ashley Williams; Glenn Box
- Home arena: Simon Skjodt Assembly Hall

2020–21 Big Ten women's basketball standings
	Conf.				Overall
Team	W		L	PCT	W		L	PCT
No. 7 Maryland †	17	–	1	.944	26	–	2	.929
No. 12 Indiana	16	–	2	.889	20	–	5	.800
No. 21 Rutgers	10	–	3	.769	14	–	5	.737
No. 16 Michigan	9	–	4	.692	16	–	6	.727
Northwestern	11	–	7	.611	16	–	9	.640
Iowa	11	–	8	.579	20	–	9	.690
No. 22 Ohio State	9	–	7	.563	13	–	7	.650
Michigan State	8	–	7	.533	15	–	9	.625
Nebraska	9	–	10	.474	13	–	13	.500
Minnesota	7	–	11	.389	8	–	13	.381
Penn State	6	–	13	.316	9	–	15	.375
Purdue	4	–	14	.222	7	–	16	.304
Illinois	2	–	16	.111	5	–	18	.217
Wisconsin	2	–	18	.100	5	–	19	.208
† 2021 Big Ten tournament winner As of March 27, 2021; Rankings from AP poll

The 2020–21 Indiana Hoosiers women's basketball team represented Indiana University Bloomington during the 2020–21 NCAA Division I women's basketball season. The Hoosiers were led by seventh-year head coach Teri Moren, and played their home games at Simon Skjodt Assembly Hall as a member of the Big Ten Conference.

== Roster ==
2020–21 Indiana Hoosiers women's basketball team
Players
Coaches

Pos.	#	Name	Height	Year	Previous school	Hometown
G	2	Keyanna Warthen	5 ft 10 in (1.78 m)	Sr	Fort Lauderdale	Fort Lauderdale, FL
G	3	Grace Waggoner	6 ft 0 in (1.83 m)	So	Rivet	Vincennes, IN
G	4	Nicole Cardaño-Hillary	5 ft 6 in (1.68 m)	Sr	Vista Ridge; George Mason	Madrid, Spain
F	10	Aleksa Gulbe	6 ft 3 in (1.91 m)	Jr	TTT Riga	Riga, Latvia
G	11	Chanel Wilson	5 ft 6 in (1.68 m)	RS So	McEachern	Powder Springs, GA
F	12	Paige Price	6 ft 2 in (1.88 m)	Fr	Box Hill	Dromana, Victoria, Australia
G	13	Jaelynn Penn	5 ft 10 in (1.78 m)	Sr	Butler	Louisville, KY
G	14	Ali Patberg	5 ft 11 in (1.8 m)	RS Sr	Columbus North; Notre Dame	Columbus, IN
G	22	Chloe Moore-McNeil	5 ft 11 in (1.8 m)	Fr	Greenfield	Sharon, TN
F	23	Kiandra Brown	6 ft 2 in (1.88 m)	Fr	St. Laurent	Montreal, Quebec, Canada
C	25	Arielle Wisne	6 ft 5 in (1.96 m)	RS Fr	Thornton	Thornton, CO
G/F	33	Danielle Patterson	6 ft 2 in (1.88 m)	RS Jr	The Mary Louis Academy; Notre Dame	Brooklyn, NY
G	34	Grace Berger	6 ft 0 in (1.83 m)	Jr	Sacred Heart	Louisville, KY
C	51	Hannah Noveroske	6 ft 5 in (1.96 m)	So	Michigan City	Michigan City, IN
F	54	Mackenzie Holmes	6 ft 3 in (1.91 m)	So	Gorham	Gorham, ME

Head coach

- Teri Moren (Purdue)

Assistant coach(es)

- Rhet Wierzba (Austin Peay)
- Ashley Wiliams (NC State)
- Glenn Box (Southeast Missouri State)

Legend

- (C) Team captain
- (S) Suspended
- (I) Ineligible
- (W) Walk-on
- Injured
- Current redshirt

Roster
Last update: 02-08-2021

== Schedule ==
- Due to the COVID-19 pandemic, games were played without an audience, or with very limited attendance.

Date time, TV	Rank^{#}	Opponent^{#}	Result	Record	Site (attendance) city, state
Non-conference regular season
11/25/2020*; 1:30 pm, BTN Plus	No. 16	Eastern Kentucky	W 100–51	1–0	Simon Skjodt Assembly Hall (150); Bloomington, IN
12/3/2020*; 6:00 pm, BTN Plus	No. 13	Samford	W 71–26	2–0	Simon Skjodt Assembly Hall (0); Bloomington, IN
12/6/2020*; 4:00 pm, ESPNU	No. 13	at No. 11 Kentucky; Rivalry	L 68–72	2–1	Memorial Coliseum (1,200); Lexington, KY
12/12/2020*; 5:30 pm, BTN Plus	No. 15	Butler	Canceled due to COVID-19 issues at Butler		Simon Skjodt Assembly Hall (0); Bloomington, IN
12/17/2020*; 4:00 pm, BTN Plus	No. 15	Tennessee	L 58–66	2–2	Simon Skjodt Assembly Hall (0); Bloomington, IN
Big Ten regular season
12/20/2020; 4:00 pm, BTN	No. 15	Nebraska	W 81–45	3–2 (1–0)	Simon Skjodt Assembly Hall (0); Bloomington, IN
12/23/2020; 2:00 pm, BTN	No. 19	at Minnesota	W 75–54	4–2 (2–0)	Williams Arena (0); Minneapolis, MN
12/31/2020; 1:00 pm, BTN	No. 20	Illinois	W 79–56	5–2 (3–0)	Simon Skjodt Assembly Hall (0); Bloomington, IN
01/4/2021; 7:00 pm, ESPN2	No. 19	at Maryland	L 80–84	5–3 (3–1)	Xfinity Center (0); College Park, MD
01/7/2021; 6:00 pm, BTN Plus	No. 19	at Penn State	W 85–64	6–3 (4–1)	Bryce Jordan Center (175); University Park
01/10/2021; 4:00 pm, BTN Plus	No. 19	Wisconsin	W 74–49	7–3 (5–1)	Simon Skjodt Assembly Hall (0); Bloomington, IN
01/14/2021; 4:00 pm, BTN	No. 18	at Purdue; Rivalry/Crimson and Gold Cup	W 66–45	8–3 (6–1)	Mackey Arena (160); West Lafayette, IN
01/18/2021; 2:30 pm, BTN	No. 16	Rutgers	Postponed due to COVID-19 issues at Rutgers		Simon Skjodt Assembly Hall (0); Bloomington, IN
01/21/2021; 6:00 pm, BTN Plus	No. 16	at Michigan State	Cancelled due to COVID-19 issues at Michigan State		Breslin Student Events Center (0); East Lansing, MI
01/24/2021; 12:00 pm, ESPN2	No. 16	at No. 21 Northwestern	W 74–61	9–3 (7–1)	Welsh-Ryan Arena (1); Evanston, IL
01/28/2021; 8:00 pm, BTN	No. 16	No. 14 Ohio State	L 70–78	9–4 (7–2)	Simon Skjodt Assembly Hall (0); Bloomington, IN
01/31/2021; 4:30 pm, BTN	No. 16	Michigan State	W 79–67	10–4 (8–2)	Simon Skjodt Assembly Hall (0); Bloomington, IN
02/04/2021; 8:00 pm, BTN	No. 17	Rutgers	Cancelled due to COVID-19 issues at Rutgers		Simon Skjodt Assembly Hall (0); Bloomington, IN
02/7/2021; 2:00 pm, ESPN2	No. 17	at Iowa	W 85–72	11–4 (9–2)	Xtream Arena (265); Iowa City, IA
02/10/2021; 3:00 pm, BTN	No. 15	Penn State	W 90–65	12–4 (10–2)	Simon Skjodt Assembly Hall (0); Bloomington, IN
02/14/2021; 3:00 pm, BTN Plus	No. 15	at Illinois	W 58–50	13–4 (11–2)	State Farm Center (0); Champaign, IL
02/18/2021; 3:00 pm, BTN	No. 14	No. 11 Michigan	W 70–65	14–4 (12–2)	Simon Skjodt Assembly Hall (0); Bloomington, IN
02/24/2021; 7:00 pm, BTN	No. 11	at Wisconsin	W 77-49	15-4 (13-2)	Kohl Center (0); Madison, WI
02/27/2021; 3:00 pm, BTN	No. 11	at No. 15 Ohio State	W 87–75	16-4 (14-2)	Value City Arena (0); Columbus, OH
03/3/2021; 4:30 pm, BTN	No. 10	Iowa; Pink Game	W 89-80	17-4 (15-2)	Simon Skjodt Assembly Hall (0); Bloomington, IN
03/6/2021; 1:00 pm, BTN Plus	No. 10	Purdue; Rivalry/Crimson and Gold Cup	W 74-59	18-4 (16-2)	Simon Skjodt Assembly Hall (0); Bloomington, IN
Big Ten Women's Tournament
03/11/2021; 6:30 pm, FS2	(2) No. 9	vs. (7) Michigan State; Quarterfinals	L 61-69	18-5	Bankers Life Fieldhouse; Indianapolis, IN
NCAA Women's Tournament
03/22/2021*; 2:00 pm, ESPNU	(4 M) No. 12	vs. (13 M) VCU; First Round	W 63-32	19-5	UTSA Convocation Center; San Antonio, TX
03/24/2021*; 5:00 pm, ESPNU	(4 M) No. 12	vs. (12 M) Belmont; Second Round	W 70-48	20-5	Bill Greehey Arena; San Antonio, TX
03/27/2021*; 6:00 pm, ESPN2	(4 M) No. 12	vs. (1 M) No. 3 NC State; Sweet Sixteen	W 73-70	21-5	Alamodome; San Antonio, TX
03/29/2021*; 9:00 pm, ESPN	(4 M) No. 12	vs. (3 M) No. 11 Arizona; Elite Eight	L 53-66	21-6	Alamodome; San Antonio, TX
*Non-conference game. ^{#}Rankings from AP Poll. (#) Tournament seedings in parentheses. All times are in Eastern Time.

== Rankings ==
Ranking movement Legend: ██ Increase in ranking. ██ Decrease in ranking. NR = Not ranked. RV = Received votes.
Poll	Pre	Wk 2	Wk 3	Wk 4	Wk 5	Wk 6	Wk 7	Wk 8	Wk 9	Wk 10	Wk 11	Wk 12	Wk 13	Wk 14	Wk 15	Wk 16	Final
AP	16	13	15	15	19	20	19	18	16	16	17	15	14	11	10	9	12
Coaches				15	19	18	18	18	15	15	17	14	12	11	10	9	10

== See also ==
- 2020–21 Indiana Hoosiers men's basketball team
