= 2020–21 Minnesota Golden Gophers women's basketball team =

Intercollegiate basketball season

2020–21 Minnesota Golden Gophers women's basketball
- Conference: Big Ten Conference
- Record: 8–13 (7–11 Big Ten)
- Head coach: Lindsay Whalen (3rd season)
- Assistant coaches: Danielle O'Banion; Carly Thibault-DuDonis; Kelly Curry
- Home arena: Williams Arena

2020–21 Big Ten women's basketball standings
	Conf.				Overall
Team	W		L	PCT	W		L	PCT
No. 7 Maryland †	17	–	1	.944	26	–	2	.929
No. 12 Indiana	16	–	2	.889	20	–	5	.800
No. 21 Rutgers	10	–	3	.769	14	–	5	.737
No. 16 Michigan	9	–	4	.692	16	–	6	.727
Northwestern	11	–	7	.611	16	–	9	.640
Iowa	11	–	8	.579	20	–	9	.690
No. 22 Ohio State	9	–	7	.563	13	–	7	.650
Michigan State	8	–	7	.533	15	–	9	.625
Nebraska	9	–	10	.474	13	–	13	.500
Minnesota	7	–	11	.389	8	–	13	.381
Penn State	6	–	13	.316	9	–	15	.375
Purdue	4	–	14	.222	7	–	16	.304
Illinois	2	–	16	.111	5	–	18	.217
Wisconsin	2	–	18	.100	5	–	19	.208
† 2021 Big Ten tournament winner As of March 27, 2021; Rankings from AP poll

The 2020–21 Minnesota Golden Gophers women's basketball team represented the University of Minnesota during the 2020–21 NCAA Division I women's basketball season. The Golden Gophers, led by third-year head coach Lindsay Whalen, played their home games at Williams Arena and were members of the Big Ten Conference.

The Golden Gophers finished the season 8–13 and 7–11 in Big Ten play, to finish in tenth place. As the ninth seed in the Big Ten tournament, they were defeated by Nebraska in the second round. They were not invited to the NCAA tournament or the WNIT.

== Previous season ==
The Golden Gophers finished the season 16–15 and 5–12 in Big Ten play, to finish in eleventh place. As the eleven seed in the Big Ten tournament, they defeated Penn State in the first round, before falling to Ohio State in the second round. The NCAA tournament and WNIT were cancelled due to the COVID-19 outbreak.

== Roster ==
2020–21 Minnesota Golden Gophers women's basketball team
Players
Coaches

Pos.	#	Name	Height	Year	Previous school	Hometown
G	1	Alexia Smith	5 ft 8 in (1.73 m)	Fr	Columbus Africentric	Columbus, OH
G	4	Jasmine Powell	5 ft 6 in (1.68 m)	So	Detroit Country Day	Detroit, MI
F	10	Erin Hedman	6 ft 3 in (1.91 m)	Fr	Eisenhower	New Berlin, WI
F	12	Laura Bagwell Katalinich	6 ft 0 in (1.83 m)	GS	Academy of the Holy Angels; Cornell	Minneapolis, MN
G	14	Sara Scalia	5 ft 10 in (1.78 m)	So	Stillwater HS	Stillwater, MN
F	15	Kayla Mershon	6 ft 3 in (1.91 m)	Jr	Minnetonka; Nebraska	Chanhassen, MN
G	21	Carolina Strande	5 ft 11 in (1.8 m)	Fr	Racine Lutheran	Racine, WI
G	23	Katie Borowicz	5 ft 7 in (1.7 m)	Fr	Roseau	Roseau, MN
F	24	Justice Ross	6 ft 0 in (1.83 m)	RS Fr	Des Moines East HS	Des Moines, IA
C	25	Klarke Sconiers	6 ft 2 in (1.88 m)	So	Christ the King HS	Queens, NY
F	30	Kadi Sissoko	6 ft 2 in (1.88 m)	RS So	Lycée Marcelin Berthelot; Syracuse	Paris, France
G	34	Gadiva Hubbard	5 ft 9 in (1.75 m)	RS Sr	Princess Anne HS	Virginia Beach, VA
F	43	Grace Cumming	6 ft 3 in (1.91 m)	RS Fr	Des Moines Roosevelt HS	Des Moines, IA

Head coach

- Lindsay Whalen (Minnesota)

Assistant coach(es)

- Danielle O'Banion (Boston College)
- Carly Thibault-DuDonis (Monmouth)
- Kelly Curry (Minnesota)

Legend

- (C) Team captain
- (S) Suspended
- (I) Ineligible
- (W) Walk-on
- Injured
- Current redshirt

Roster
Last update: June 29, 2021

== Schedule and results ==
Date time, TV	Rank^{#}	Opponent^{#}	Result	Record	Site (attendance) city, state
Non-conference regular season
December 2, 2020*; 2:00 p.m., BTN+		Eastern Illinois	W 72–68	1–0	Williams Arena (0); Minneapolis, MN
December 6, 2020*; 2:00 p.m., BTN+		Drake	L 66–99	1–1	Williams Arena (0); Minneapolis, MN
Big Ten Conference season
December 9, 2020; 8:00 p.m., BTN		Michigan State	L 66–81	1–2 (0–1)	Williams Arena (0); Minneapolis, MN
December 14, 2020; 8:00 p.m., BTN		at No. 16 Northwestern	L 51–80	1–3 (0–2)	Welsh–Ryan Arena (0); Evanston, IL
December 23, 2020; 1:00 p.m., BTN+		No. 19 Indiana	L 54–75	1–4 (0–3)	Williams Arena (0); Minneapolis, MN
January 3, 2021; 2:00 p.m., BTN+		at Wisconsin	W 88–83 ^{OT}	2–4 (1–3)	Kohl Center (0); Madison, WI
January 6, 2021; 6:00 p.m., BTN+		at Iowa	L 79–92	2–5 (1–4)	Carver–Hawkeye Arena (296); Iowa City, IA
January 10, 2021; 4:00 p.m., BTN+		Penn State	L 60–69	2–6 (1–5)	Williams Arena (0); Minneapolis, MN
January 14, 2021; 5:00 p.m., BTN		No. 9 Maryland	L 73–90	2–7 (1–6)	Williams Arena (0); Minneapolis, MN
January 19, 2021; 3:00 p.m., BTN		at Nebraska	W 76–71	3–7 (2–6)	Pinnacle Bank Arena (0); Lincoln, NE
January 25, 2021; 5:00 p.m., BTN		at Penn State	W 85–76	4–7 (3–6)	Bryce Jordan Center (180); University Park, PA
January 28, 2021; 4:00 p.m., BTN+		Purdue	W 77–72	5–7 (4–6)	Williams Arena (0); Minneapolis, MN
January 31, 2021; 4:00 p.m., BTN+		Iowa	L 68–94	5–8 (4–7)	Williams Arena (0); Minneapolis, MN
February 4, 2021; 5:00 p.m., BTN		at No. 13 Michigan	Canceled		Crisler Center; Ann Arbor, MI
February 7, 2021; Noon, BTN+		at No. 11 Ohio State	L 59–83	5–9 (4–8)	Value City Arena (58); Columbus, OH
February 10, 2021; 6:00 p.m., BTN+		Illinois	W 83–73	6–9 (5–8)	Williams Arena (0); Minneapolis, MN
February 14, 2021; 1:00 p.m., BTN+		Wisconsin	W 68–63	7–9 (6–8)	Williams Arena (0); Minneapolis, MN
February 17, 2021; 6:00 p.m., BTN+		at Rutgers	L 56–83	7–10 (6–9)	Louis Brown Athletic Center (0); Piscataway, NJ
February 20, 2021; 11:00 a.m., BTN+		at No. 9 Maryland	L 62–94	7–11 (6–10)	Xfinity Center (0); College Park, MD
February 24, 2021; 6:00 p.m., BTN+		Nebraska	W 73–63	8–11 (7–10)	Williams Arena (0); Minneapolis, MN
February 28, 2021; 1:30 p.m.		No. 12 Michigan	Canceled		Williams Arena; Minneapolis, MN
March 5, 2021; 4:00 p.m., BTN+		at Illinois	L 64–72	8–12 (7–11)	State Farm Center (0); Champaign, IL
Big Ten women's tournament
March 10, 2021; 10:00 a.m., BTN	(9)	vs. (8) Nebraska; Second round	L 61–72	8–13	Bankers Life Fieldhouse (716); Indianapolis, IN
*Non-conference game. ^{#}Rankings from AP poll. (#) Tournament seedings in parentheses. All times are in Central.

== Rankings ==
Regular-season polls
Poll	Pre- Season	Week 2	Week 3	Week 4	Week 5	Week 6	Week 7	Week 8	Week 9	Week 10	Week 11	Week 12	Week 13	Week 14	Week 15	Week 16	Final
AP																	
Coaches																	

Legend
	Increase in ranking
	Decrease in ranking
	Not ranked previous week
(RV)	Received votes
(NR)	Not ranked and did not receive votes

The Coaches Poll did not release a Week 2 poll and the AP poll did not release a poll after the NCAA tournament.

== See also ==
- 2020–21 Minnesota Golden Gophers men's basketball team
