= 2013 Women's Basketball Invitational =

American women's college basketball tournament

- Season: 2012–13
- Teams: 16
- Champions: Detroit

The 2013 Women's Basketball Invitational (WBI) was a single-elimination tournament of 16 National Collegiate Athletic Association (NCAA) Division I teams that did not participate in the 2013 NCAA Women's Division I Basketball Tournament or 2013 WNIT. The field of 16 was announced on March 18, 2013. All games were hosted by the higher seed throughout the tournament, unless the higher seed's arena was unavailable. The championship game was hosted by the school with the higher end of the season RPI. The tournament was won by the Detroit Mercy Titans.

== Bracket ==
=== West Region ===
1st Round; March 20–21
1	Mercer	70
8	McNeese State	82
4	Elon	68
5	Eastern Kentucky	61
2	Lamar	70
7	Presbyterian	48
3	Utah State	69
6	South Dakota	77

Quarterfinals; March 23–24
8	McNeese State	66
4	Elon	58
2	Lamar	48
6	South Dakota	71

Semi-finals; March 27–28
8	McNeese State	71
6	South Dakota	63

=== East Region ===
1st Round; March 20–21
1	Detroit	69
8	Belmont	68
4	Northern Kentucky	70
5	College of Charleston	72
2	Penn	65
7	Howard	60
3	Fairfield	71
6	St. Francis	51

Quarterfinals; March 23–24
1	Detroit	79
5	Charleston	67
2	Penn	49
3	Fairfield	48

Semi-finals; March 27–28
1	Detroit	71
2	Penn	68

=== WBI Championship Game ===
Championship Game; March 30 3:00 PM
8	McNeese State	62
1	Detroit	73

== See also ==
- 2013 NCAA Women's Division I Basketball Tournament
- 2013 Women's National Invitation Tournament
- 2012 Women's Basketball Invitational
