= Nancy Fahey =

American basketball coach

Biographical details
- Born: November 3, 1958 (age 67); Belleville, Wisconsin, U.S.

Playing career
- 1977–1981: Wisconsin

Coaching career (HC unless noted)
- 1982–1986: Johnsburg HS
- 1986–2017: WashU
- 2017–2022: Illinois

Head coaching record
- Overall: 779–232 (.771)

Accomplishments and honors

Championships
- 23 UAA (1988–1990, 1992–1995, 1998–2007, 2009–2010, 2014–2017); 5 NCAA Division III Women's Basketball Championships (1998–2001, 2010)

Awards
- 2× WBCA Coach of the Year (2000, 2011)
- Women's Basketball Hall of Fame

Nancy Fahey (born November 3, 1958) is an American retired head women's basketball coach. She coached at the University of Illinois, and she also served as head coach at Washington University in St. Louis. She is a graduate of the University of Wisconsin, where she played college basketball. Fahey was inducted into the Women's Basketball Hall of Fame in 2012.

== Coaching career ==
=== Johnsburg High School ===
Fahey began her coaching career shortly after graduating from Wisconsin. She was hired as the girls' basketball coach at Johnsburg High School in 1982. Her final two years at the program, she led the Lady Skyhawks to 20-win seasons and regional championships both years.

=== Washington University in St. Louis ("Wash U") ===
In 1986, Fahey was named as head women's basketball coach at Washington University in St. Louis. She found some success in her first season with the Bears, going 16–5. The school joined in the newly created University Athletic Association and competition started in the 1987-1988 season. Wash U won the first three and seven of the first eight UAA championships, making the NCAA Division III women's basketball tournament seven of eight years as well. In 1991, despite finishing second in the UAA, Fahey made her first NCAA Tournament run, finishing in fourth place after losing in the Final Four to St. Thomas and the third-place game to Eastern Connecticut. In 1994, the Bears made another deep run into the tournament, this time making the championship game before losing to Capital University.

The 1997-98 season began a new era for Fahey. The Bears went 28–2, winning the national championship over Southern Maine 77-69. The next season, they went an undefeated 30-0, winning the national championship over Saint Benedict 74-65. The next year was much of the same, going 30–0 once again and winning a third straight national championship, this time once again over Southern Maine 79-33. In 2000-01, the team failed to go undefeated, but finished at 28-2 and won their fourth straight national championship over Messiah College 67-45.

Wash U won the UAA conference every year from 1997-98 to 2006-07, again going to the national championship game in 2007. However, they lost to DePauw 55-52. The 2007-08 season was the first time the Bears failed to win 20 games in a season since the national championship run, going 19–8 and finishing second in the conference. However, they rebounded the next year, going 26–5 and losing the national championship game to George Fox University 60-53. In 2009-10, the Bears made their fifth national championship run, this time finishing the season at 29-2 and defeating Hope College 65-59 to take home the title. The following year, despite finishing second in the UAA, the team went to the national championship game for the third consecutive year, losing to Amherst 64-55.

Over the next seven seasons, Fahey would lead Wash U to another four conference championships and advance to the quarterfinals twice (in 2015-16 and 2016–17).

After winning her fifth national championship, Fahey became the first NCAA Division III coach to be admitted to the Women's Basketball Hall of Fame in the Class of 2012.

=== University of Illinois ===
On March 22, 2017, Fahey was named as head women's basketball coach at the University of Illinois, following former Washington University in St. Louis athletic director Josh Whitman to the school after he left for Illinois the previous year. After five seasons at Illinois, Fahey announced her retirement on March 4, 2022. She stated, "I want to thank all the coaches and staff members I've worked with for the past 40 years, from Johnsburg High School and Washington University to the University of Illinois. A special thanks to all my players who will always have a special place in my heart. I wish Illinois women's basketball the very best in the future. I'm ready for the next chapter in my life."

== Head coaching record ==
Record table
Season	Team	Overall	Conference	Standing	Postseason
Washington University Bears (Independent) (1986–1987)
1986–87	Washington University	16–5			
Washington University Bears (University Athletic Association) (1987–2017)
1987–88	Washington University	21–5	5–2	1st	NCAA D3 2nd Round
1988–89	Washington University	19–6	9–3	1st	
1989–90	Washington University	25–3	14–0	1st	NCAA D3 1st Round
1990–91	Washington University	24–7	11–3	2nd	NCAA D3 4th Place
1991–92	Washington University	22–5	12–2	1st	NCAA D3 1st Round
1992–93	Washington University	22–4	12–2	1st	NCAA D3 1st Round
1993–94	Washington University	26–4	13–1	1st	NCAA D3 Runner–Up
1994–95	Washington University	20–7	12–2	1st	NCAA D3 1st Round
1995–96	Washington University	22–6	12–2	2nd	NCAA D3 1st Round
1996–97	Washington University	19–7	10–4	3rd	NCAA D3 1st Round
1997–98	Washington University	28–2	13–1	1st	NCAA D3 National Champions
1998–99	Washington University	30–0	14–0	1st	NCAA D3 National Champions
1999–00	Washington University	30–0	15–0	1st	NCAA D3 National Champions
2000–01	Washington University	28–2	14–1	1st	NCAA D3 National Champions
2001–02	Washington University	25–1	14–0	1st	NCAA D3 2nd Round
2002–03	Washington University	26–2	13–1	1st	NCAA D3 Quarterfinals
2003–04	Washington University	22–5	11–3	1st	NCAA D3 Sweet 16
2004–05	Washington University	22–5	11–3	1st	NCAA D3 2nd Round
2005–06	Washington University	25–3	13–1	1st	NCAA D3 Sweet 16
2006–07	Washington University	25–6	12–2	1st	NCAA D3 Runner–Up
2007–08	Washington University	19–8	10–4	2nd	NCAA D3 2nd Round
2008–09	Washington University	26–5	13–1	1st	NCAA D3 Runner–Up
2009–10	Washington University	29–2	13–1	1st	NCAA D3 National Champions
2010–11	Washington University	25–6	11–3	2nd	NCAA D3 Runner–Up
2011–12	Washington University	21–6	10–4	2nd	NCAA D3 2nd Round
2012–13	Washington University	22–6	10–4	3rd	NCAA D3 Sweet 16
2013–14	Washington University	24–3	13–1	1st	NCAA D3 2nd Round
2014–15	Washington University	25–3	12–2	1st	NCAA D3 Sweet 16
2015–16	Washington University	23–6	11–3	1st	NCAA D3 Quarterfinals
2016–17	Washington University	26–3	12–2	1st	NCAA D3 Quarterfinals
Washington University:		737–133 (.847)	355–58 (.860)		
Illinois Fighting Illini (Big Ten Conference) (2017–2022)
2017–18	Illinois	9–22	0–16	14th	
2018–19	Illinois	10–20	2–16	14th	
2019–20	Illinois	11–19	2–16	13th	
2020–21	Illinois	5–18	2–16	13th	
2021–22	Illinois	7–20	1–13	14th	
Illinois:		42–99 (.298)	7–77 (.083)		
Total:		779–232 (.771)			
National champion Postseason invitational champion Conference regular season champion Conference regular season and conference tournament champion Division regular season champion Division regular season and conference tournament champion Conference tournament champion

== See also ==
- List of college women's basketball career coaching wins leaders
