= 2020–21 Wake Forest Demon Deacons women's basketball team =

Intercollegiate basketball season

2020–21 Wake Forest Demon Deacons women's basketball

NCAA tournament, first round
- Conference: Atlantic Coast Conference
- Record: 12–13 (8–10 ACC)
- Head coach: Jen Hoover (9th season)
- Assistant coaches: Erin Dickerson; Melissa D'Amico; Dane Sparrow
- Home arena: LJVM Coliseum

2020–21 ACC women's basketball standings
	Conf.				Overall
Team	W		L	PCT	W		L	PCT
No. 8 Louisville	14	–	2	.875	26	–	4	.867
No. 3 NC State†	12	–	2	.857	22	–	3	.880
Georgia Tech	12	–	6	.667	17	–	9	.654
Syracuse	9	–	7	.563	15	–	9	.625
Florida State	9	–	7	.563	10	–	9	.526
Notre Dame	8	–	7	.533	10	–	10	.500
Virginia Tech	8	–	8	.500	15	–	10	.600
North Carolina	8	–	9	.471	13	–	11	.542
Miami (FL)	8	–	10	.444	11	–	11	.500
Wake Forest	8	–	10	.444	12	–	13	.480
Clemson	5	–	12	.294	12	–	14	.462
Pittsburgh	3	–	12	.200	5	–	14	.263
Boston College	2	–	11	.154	7	–	12	.368
Duke	0	–	1	.000	3	–	1	.750
Virginia	0	–	2	.000	0	–	5	.000
† 2021 ACC tournament winner Duke suspended their season on December 25, 2020; Virginia suspended their season on January 14, 2021; As of March 30, 2021; Rankings from AP poll

The 2020–21 Wake Forest Demon Deacons women's basketball team represented Wake Forest University during the 2020–21 NCAA Division I women's basketball season. The Demon Deacons, led by ninth-year head coach Jen Hoover, were members of the Atlantic Coast Conference and played their home games at the Lawrence Joel Veterans Memorial Coliseum.

The Demon Deacons finished the season 12–13 and 8–10 in ACC play to finish in a tie for ninth place. As the ninth seed in the ACC tournament, they defeated North Carolina in the second round before losing to Louisville in the quarterfinals. They received an at-large bid to the NCAA tournament as the nine seed in the Alamo Region. In the tournament, they lost in the first round to eight seed Oklahoma State.

== Previous season ==
They finished the season 16–16 and 7–11 in ACC play to finish in a tie for eleventh place. As the thirteenth seed in the ACC tournament, they defeated North Carolina in the first round and Virginia Tech in the second round before losing to Florida State in the quarterfinals. The NCAA tournament and WNIT were cancelled due to the COVID-19 outbreak.

== Off-season ==
=== Departures ===
Name	Number	Pos.	Height	Year	Hometown	Reason for departure
Ellen Hahne	10	G	5'11"	Sophomore	Stockholm, Sweden	Transferred to Albany
Alex Sharp	14	G	6'1"	Senior	Melbourne, Australia	Graduated
Raegyn Branch	21	F	6'2"	Senior	Arlington, TN	Graduated
Ona Udoh	44	F	6'1"	Senior	Fayetteville, NC	Graduated

=== Recruiting class ===
College recruiting
Name	Hometown	School	Height	Weight	Commit date
Jewel Spear; PG	The Colony, TX	The Colony	5 ft 10 in (1.78 m)	N/A	
Jewel Spear; PG	Recruit ratings: ESPN: (94)				
Nevaeh Brown; G	Charlotte, NC	Mallard Creek	5 ft 8 in (1.73 m)	N/A	
Nevaeh Brown; G	Recruit ratings: ESPN: (89)				
Aliah McWhorter; G	Cincinnati, OH	Sycamore	6 ft 1 in (1.85 m)	N/A	
Aliah McWhorter; G	Recruit ratings: ESPN: (89)				
Demeara Hinds; F	Douglasville, GA	Lithia Springs	6 ft 2 in (1.88 m)	N/A	
Demeara Hinds; F	Recruit ratings: ESPN: (89)				
Overall recruit ranking:
Note: In many cases, Scout, Rivals, 247Sports, On3, and ESPN may conflict in their listings of height and weight.; In these cases, the average was taken. ESPN grades are on a 100-point scale.; Sources:

== Roster ==
2020–21 Wake Forest Demon Deacons women's basketball team
Players
Coaches

Pos.	#	Name	Height	Year	Previous school	Hometown
F	0	Maya Banks	6 ft 4 in (1.93 m)	Sr	Hamilton	Chandler, AZ
G	1	Anaia Hoard	5 ft 10 in (1.78 m)	So	Wesleyan Christian Academy	Carnon, France
G	2	Kaia Harrison	5 ft 7 in (1.7 m)	So	Baldwin	Baldwin, NY
G	3	Mack Maier	5 ft 10 in (1.78 m)	So	Chaparral	Parker, CO
G	4	Aliah McWhorter	6 ft 1 in (1.85 m)	Fr	Sycamore	Cincinnati, OH
G	5	Gina Conti	5 ft 10 in (1.78 m)	Sr	Grove City	Grove City, OH
F	11	Ivana Raca	6 ft 2 in (1.88 m)	Sr	1st Lyceum of Voula	Belgrade, Serbia
G	12	Kaylen Dickson	5 ft 11 in (1.8 m)	Jr	Warren Township	Gurnee, IL
G	15	Nevaeah Brown	5 ft 8 in (1.73 m)	Fr	Mallard Creek	Charlotte, NC
F	20	Olivia Summiel	6 ft 2 in (1.88 m)	So	Marianapolis Prep	Dayville, CT
F	23	Christina Morra	6 ft 2 in (1.88 m)	Jr	King's Christian Collegiate	Toronto, Canada
G	24	Jewel Spear	5 ft 10 in (1.78 m)	Fr	The Colony	The Colony, TX
F	25	DeMeara Hinds	6 ft 2 in (1.88 m)	Fr	Lithia Springs	Douglasville, GA
G	32	Alexandria Scruggs	5 ft 10 in (1.78 m)	So	E. E. Smith	Fayetteville, NC

Head coach

- Jen Hoover (Wake Forest)

Assistant coach(es)

- Erin Dickerson (Northwestern)
- Melissa D'Amico (Notre Dame)
- Dane Sparrow (UNC–Greensboro)

Legend

- (C) Team captain
- (S) Suspended
- (I) Ineligible
- (W) Walk-on
- Injured
- Current redshirt

Roster
Last update: December 9, 2020

== Schedule ==
Date time, TV	Rank^{#}	Opponent^{#}	Result	Record	Site (attendance) city, state
Regular season
November 27, 2020*; 11:30 a.m., FloHoops		vs. No. 14 Arkansas; Gulf Coast Showcase	L 82–98	0–1	Alico Arena; Fort Myers, FL
November 28, 2020*; 11:30 a.m., FloHoops		vs. Davison; Gulf Coast Showcase	W 85–77	1–1	Alico Arena; Fort Myers, FL
November 29, 2020*; 2:30 p.m., FloHoops		vs. No. 24 Missouri State; Gulf Coast Showcase	W 68–59	2–1	Alico Arena; Fort Myers, FL
December 3, 2020*; 6:00 p.m., ESPN+		at Charlotte	W 78–75	3–1	Dale F. Halton Arena (52); Charlotte, NC
December 10, 2020; 6:00 p.m., ACCN		North Carolina	W 57–54	4–1 (1–0)	LJVM Coliseum; Winston–Salem, NC
December 13, 2020*; Noon, ACCNX		Norfolk State	Canceled due to COVID-19		LJVM Coliseum; Winston–Salem, NC
December 17, 2020; 7:00 p.m., RSN		at No. 4 NC State	L 65–79	4–2 (1–1)	Reynolds Coliseum (25); Raleigh, NC
December 20, 2020; 2:00 p.m., ACCNX		at North Carolina	L 74–77 ^{OT}	4–3 (1–2)	Carmichael Arena (0); Chapel Hill, NC
December 22, 2020*; 11:00 a.m.		Coastal Carolina	Canceled due to COVID-19		LJVM Coliseum; Winston–Salem, NC
January 3, 2021; 1:00 p.m., ACCNX		Florida State	Postponed due to COVID-19		LJVM Coliseum; Winston–Salem, NC
January 7, 2021; 6:00 p.m., ACCN		Miami (FL)	W 63–60	5–3 (2–2)	LJVM Coliseum (0); Winston–Salem, NC
January 10, 2021; 4:00 p.m., ACCN		No. 3 NC State	Postponed due to COVID-19		LJVM Coliseum; Winston–Salem, NC
January 10, 2021; 4:00 p.m., ACCN		Boston College	W 68–48	6–3 (3–2)	LJVM Coliseum (0); Winston–Salem, NC
January 12, 2021; 6:00 p.m., ACCNX		at Virginia	Postponed due to COVID-19		John Paul Jones Arena; Charlottesville, VA
January 14, 2021; 4:00 p.m., ACCN		at Notre Dame	L 72–79	6–4 (3–3)	Purcell Pavilion (50); Notre Dame, IN
January 17, 2021; 4:00 p.m., ACCN		at Virginia Tech	W 67–64	7–4 (4–3)	Cassell Coliseum (250); Blacksburg, VA
January 21, 2021; 6:00 p.m., ACCN		Georgia Tech	L 44–73	7–5 (4–4)	LJVM Coliseum (0); Winston–Salem, NC
January 24, 2021; 2:00 p.m., ACCN		No. 1 Louisville	L 63–65	7–6 (4–5)	LJVM Coliseum (0); Winston–Salem, NC
January 28, 2021; 6:00 p.m., ACCNX		Florida State	W 73–59	8–6 (5–5)	LJVM Coliseum (0); Winston–Salem, NC
January 31, 2021; 2:00 p.m., ACCN		Clemson	L 66–69	8–7 (5–6)	LJVM Coliseum (0); Winston–Salem, NC
February 4, 2021; 6:00 p.m., ACCN		at Syracuse	L 78–85	8–8 (5–7)	Carrier Dome (0); Syracuse, NY
February 7, 2021; Noon, RSN		at Georgia Tech	W 61–52	9–8 (6–7)	McCamish Pavilion (1,200); Atlanta, GA
February 11, 2021; 6:00 p.m., ACCNX		Pittsburgh	W 64–61 ^{OT}	10–8 (7–7)	LJVM Coliseum (0); Winston–Salem, NC
February 14, 2021; 2:00 p.m., ACCN		at Clemson	W 72–65	11–8 (8–7)	Littlejohn Coliseum (512); Clemson, SC
February 18, 2021; 7:00 p.m., RSN		No. 4 NC State	L 47–66	11–9 (8–8)	LJVM Coliseum (0); Winston–Salem, NC
February 21, 2021; 1:00 p.m., ACCNX		Duke	Canceled due to Duke ending season		LJVM Coliseum; Winston–Salem, NC
February 25, 2021; 7:00 p.m., ACCNX		at Miami (FL)	L 67–69	11–10 (8–9)	Watsco Center (0); Coral Gables, FL
February 28, 2021; Noon, RSN		at Florida State	L 51–59	11–11 (8–10)	Donald L. Tucker Center (1,163); Tallahassee, FL
ACC Women's Tournament
March 4, 2021; Noon, RSN	(9)	vs. (8) North Carolina; Second Round	W 82–71	12–11	Greensboro Coliseum (609); Greensboro, NC
March 5, 2021; Noon, RSN	(9)	vs. (1) No. 5 Louisville; Quarterfinals	L 53–65	12–12	Greensboro Coliseum (592); Greensboro, NC
NCAA tournament
March 21, 2021; 1:00 p.m., ESPN2	(9 A)	vs. (8 A) Oklahoma State; First Round	L 61–84	12–13	Bill Greehey Arena; San Antonio, TX
*Non-conference game. ^{#}Rankings from AP Poll. (#) Tournament seedings in parentheses. A=Alamo. All times are in Eastern.

== Rankings ==
Regular season polls
Poll	Pre- season	Week 2	Week 3	Week 4	Week 5	Week 6	Week 7	Week 8	Week 9	Week 10	Week 11	Week 12	Week 13	Week 14	Week 15	Week 16	Week 17	Week 18	Week 19	Final
AP		RV	RV	RV	RV	RV														
Coaches			RV				RV													N/A

Legend
	Increase in ranking
	Decrease in ranking
	No change
(RV)	Received votes
(NR)	Not ranked

Coaches did not release a Week 2 poll, and AP does not release a final poll.

== See also ==
- 2020–21 Wake Forest Demon Deacons men's basketball team
