= 2020–21 North Carolina Tar Heels women's basketball team =

Intercollegiate basketball season

2020–21 North Carolina Tar Heels women's basketball

NCAA tournament, first round
- Conference: Atlantic Coast Conference
- Record: 13–11 (8–9 ACC)
- Head coach: Courtney Banghart (2nd season)
- Assistant coaches: Carrie Moore; Joanne Aluka-White; Adrian Walters
- Home arena: Carmichael Arena

2020–21 ACC women's basketball standings
	Conf.				Overall
Team	W		L	PCT	W		L	PCT
No. 8 Louisville	14	–	2	.875	26	–	4	.867
No. 3 NC State†	12	–	2	.857	22	–	3	.880
Georgia Tech	12	–	6	.667	17	–	9	.654
Syracuse	9	–	7	.563	15	–	9	.625
Florida State	9	–	7	.563	10	–	9	.526
Notre Dame	8	–	7	.533	10	–	10	.500
Virginia Tech	8	–	8	.500	15	–	10	.600
North Carolina	8	–	9	.471	13	–	11	.542
Miami (FL)	8	–	10	.444	11	–	11	.500
Wake Forest	8	–	10	.444	12	–	13	.480
Clemson	5	–	12	.294	12	–	14	.462
Pittsburgh	3	–	12	.200	5	–	14	.263
Boston College	2	–	11	.154	7	–	12	.368
Duke	0	–	1	.000	3	–	1	.750
Virginia	0	–	2	.000	0	–	5	.000
† 2021 ACC tournament winner Duke suspended their season on December 25, 2020; Virginia suspended their season on January 14, 2021; As of March 30, 2021; Rankings from AP poll

The 2020–21 North Carolina Tar Heels women's basketball team represented the University of North Carolina at Chapel Hill during the 2020–21 NCAA Division I women's basketball season. The Tar Heels, led by second-year head coach Courtney Banghart, played their games at Carmichael Arena, and are members of the Atlantic Coast Conference.

The Tar Heels finished the season 13–11 and 8–9 in ACC play to finish in eighth place. In the ACC tournament, they lost to Wake Forest in the second round. They received an at-large bid to the NCAA tournament, where they were the ten seed in the HemisFair Regional. In the tournament, they lost to Alabama in the first round to end their season.

== Previous season ==
For the 2019–20 season, the Tar Heels finished 16–14 and 7–11 in ACC play to finish in a tie for eleventh place. As the twelfth seed in the ACC tournament, they lost to Wake Forest in the first round. The NCAA tournament and WNIT were cancelled due to the COVID-19 outbreak.

== Off-season ==
=== Departures ===
Name	Number	Pos.	Height	Year	Hometown	Reason for departure
Taylor Koenen	1	G	6'2"	Senior	Savage, MN	Graduated
Madinah Muhammad	3	G	5'8"	(redshirt) Senior	Chicago, IL	Graduated
Liz Roberts	14	G	5'8"	Senior	Chapel Hill, NC	Graduated
Olivia Smith	15	G	6'0"	Senior	Raleigh, NC	Graduated
Leah Church	20	G	5'8"	Junior	Purlear, NC	Graduated early
Shayla Bennett	22	G	5'9"	Senior	Piedmont, SC	Graduated
Nia Daniel	32	G	5'10"	Freshman	Charlotte, NC	Transferred to Gulf Coast State
Lexi Duckett	33	G	5'11"	Freshman	Daytona Beach, FL	Transferred to Wisconsin
Naomi Van Nes	34	C	6'6"	Senior	Dorchester, England	Graduated

=== Incoming transfers ===
Name	Number	Pos.	Height	Year	Hometown	Previous school
Petra Holešínská	2	G	5'10"	Graduate student	Vracov, Czech Republic	Illinois
Stephanie Watts	5	G	5'11"	Graduate student	Wesley Chapel, NC	USC

=== Recruiting class ===
College recruiting
Name	Hometown	School	Height	Weight	Commit date
Deja Kelly; G	San Antonio, TX	Duncanville	5 ft 8 in (1.73 m)	N/A	
Deja Kelly; G	Recruit ratings: ESPN: (98)				
Anya Poole; F	Raleigh, NC	Southeast Raleigh	6 ft 2 in (1.88 m)	N/A	
Anya Poole; F	Recruit ratings: ESPN: (96)				
Alexandra Zelaya; F	Goodyear, AZ	Millennium	6 ft 3 in (1.91 m)	N/A	
Alexandra Zelaya; F	Recruit ratings: ESPN: (92)				
Kennedy Todd-Williams; G	Jacksonville, NC	Jacksonville	5 ft 11 in (1.80 m)	N/A	
Kennedy Todd-Williams; G	Recruit ratings: ESPN: (90)				
Alyssa Ustby; G	Rochester, MN	Lourdes	6 ft 1 in (1.85 m)	N/A	
Alyssa Ustby; G	Recruit ratings: ESPN: (90)				
Overall recruit ranking:
Note: In many cases, Scout, Rivals, 247Sports, On3, and ESPN may conflict in their listings of height and weight.; In these cases, the average was taken. ESPN grades are on a 100-point scale.; Sources:

== Roster ==
2020–21 North Carolina Tar Heels women's basketball team
Players
Coaches

Pos.	#	Name	Height	Year	Previous school	Hometown
F	0	Alexandria Zelaya	6 ft 4 in (1.93 m)	Fr	Millennium	Goodyear, AZ
G	1	Alyssa Ustby	6 ft 1 in (1.85 m)	Fr	Lourdes	Rochester, MN
G	2	Petra Holešínská	5 ft 10 in (1.78 m)	GS	Sportovni Gzmnazium Ludvika Danka; Illinois	Vracov, Czech Republic
G	3	Kennedy Todd-Williams	5 ft 11 in (1.8 m)	Fr	Jacksonville	Jacksonville, NC
G	4	Kennady Tucker	5 ft 10 in (1.78 m)	So	North Little Rock	Little Rock, AR
G	5	Stephanie Watts	5 ft 11 in (1.8 m)	GS	Weddington	Wesley Chapel, NC
G	11	Ariel Young	6 ft 1 in (1.85 m)	RS So	Lincoln; Michigan	Tallahassee, FL
F	21	Malu Tshitenge	6 ft 3 in (1.91 m)	So	St. John's College	Germantown, MD
G	25	Deja Kelly	5 ft 8 in (1.73 m)	Fr	Duncanville	San Antonio, TX
F	30	Jaelynn Murray	6 ft 2 in (1.88 m)	RS Jr	Dreher	Columbia, SC
F	31	Anya Poole	6 ft 2 in (1.88 m)	Fr	Southeast Raleigh	Raleigh, NC
C	44	Janelle Bailey	6 ft 4 in (1.93 m)	Sr	Providence Day	Charlotte, NC

Head coach

- Courtney Banghart (Dartmouth)

Assistant coach(es)

- Carrie Moore (Western Michigan)
- Joanne Aluka-White (Middle Tennessee)
- Adrian Walters (Saint Francis (PA))

Legend

- (C) Team captain
- (S) Suspended
- (I) Ineligible
- (W) Walk-on
- Injured
- Current redshirt

Roster
Last update: December 3, 2020

== Schedule ==
Date time, TV	Rank^{#}	Opponent^{#}	Result	Record	Site (attendance) city, state
Non-conference regular season
November 25, 2020*; 1:00 p.m., ACCNX		Radford	W 90–61	1–0	Carmichael Arena (0); Chapel Hill, NC
November 28, 2020*; 1:00 p.m., ACCNX		UNC Greensboro	W 96–35	2–0	Carmichael Arena (0); Chapel Hill, NC
November 29, 2020*; 1:00 p.m. p.m., ACCNX		High Point	W 95–70	3–0	Carmichael Arena (0); Chapel Hill, NC
December 3, 2020*; 6:00 p.m., ACCNX		South Carolina State	W 98–28	4–0	Carmichael Arena (0); Chapel Hill, NC
December 6, 2020*; 4:00 p.m., ACCNX		Charlotte	W 81–75	5–0	Carmichael Arena (0); Chapel Hill, NC
ACC regular season
December 10, 2020; 6:00 p.m., ACCN		at Wake Forest	L 54–57	5–1 (0–1)	LJVM Coliseum (0); Winston-Salem, NC
December 13, 2020; 4:00 p.m., ACCN		at No. 2 Louisville	Postponed		KFC Yum! Center; Louisville, KY
December 14, 2020; 2:00 p.m., ACCN		Miami (FL)	L 63–67	5–2 (0–2)	Carmichael Arena (0); Chapel Hill, NC
December 17, 2020; 6:00 p.m., ACCNX		No. 18 Syracuse	W 92–68	6–2 (1–2)	Carmichael Arena (0); Chapel Hill, NC
December 20, 2020; 1:00 p.m., ACCNX		Wake Forest	W 77–74 ^{OT}	7–2 (2–2)	Carmichael Arena (0); Chapel Hill, NC
December 31, 2020; 2:00 p.m., ACCNX		at No. 22 Syracuse	Postponed		Carrier Dome; Syracuse, NY
January 1, 2021; Noon, ACCNX		at No. 2 Louisville	Postponed		KFC Yum! Center; Louisville, KY
January 3, 2021; 1:00 p.m., RSN		at Pittsburgh	Postponed		Petersen Events Center; Pittsburgh, PA
January 10, 2021; 1:00 p.m., RSN		Miami (FL)	L 59–69	7–3 (2–3)	Carmichael Arena (0); Chapel Hill, NC
January 14, 2021; 6:00 p.m., ACCNX		Virginia Tech	L 54–66	7–4 (2–4)	Carmichael Arena (0); Chapel Hill, NC
January 17, 2021; 2:00 p.m., ACCN		Duke; Rivalry	Canceled due to Duke ending season		Carmichael Arena; Chapel Hill, NC
January 19, 2021; Noon, ACCN		at No. 23 Syracuse	L 76–88	7–5 (2–5)	Carrier Dome (0); Syracuse, NY
January 21, 2021; 6:00 p.m., ACCNX		at Virginia	Canceled due to Virginia ending season		John Paul Jones Arena; Charlottesville, VA
January 24, 2021; Noon, ESPNU		Notre Dame	W 78–73	8–5 (3–5)	Carmichael Arena (0); Chapel Hill, NC
January 28, 2021; 7:00 p.m., ACCN		at No. 1 Louisville	L 68–79	8–6 (3–6)	KFC Yum! Center (2,748); Louisville, KY
January 31, 2021; 2:00 p.m., ACCNX		at Virginia Tech	L 69–73	8–7 (3–7)	Cassell Coliseum (250); Blacksburg, VA
February 4, 2021; 6:00 p.m., ACCNX		Florida State	L 51–61	8–8 (3–8)	Carmichael Arena (0); Chapel Hill, NC
February 7, 2021; 2:00 p.m., ACCN		No. 4 NC State; Rivalry	W 76–69	9–8 (4–8)	Carmichael Arena (0); Chapel Hill, NC
February 11, 2021; 6:00 p.m., ACCNX		Boston College	Postponed		Carmichael Arena; Chapel Hill, NC
February 14, 2021; 4:00 p.m., ACCN		Virginia	Canceled due to Virginia ending season		Carmichael Arena; Chapel Hill, NC
February 14, 2021; 2:00 p.m., ACCNX		at Pittsburgh	W 81–72	10–8 (5–8)	Petersen Events Center (0); Pittsburgh, PA
February 18, 2021; 7:00 p.m., ACCNX		at Clemson	W 77–64	11–8 (6–8)	Littlejohn Coliseum (326); Clemson, SC
February 21, 2021; Noon, ESPN2		at No. 4 NC State; Rivalry	L 63–82	11–9 (6–9)	Reynolds Coliseum (25); Raleigh, NC
February 25, 2021; 6:00 p.m., ACCNX		Georgia Tech	W 84–59	12–9 (7–9)	Carmichael Arena (0); Chapel Hill, NC
February 28, 2021; 2:00 p.m., RSN		at Duke	Canceled due to Duke ending season		Cameron Indoor Stadium; Durham, NC
February 28, 2021; 2:00 p.m., ACCNX		at Virginia Tech	W 68–63	13–9 (8–9)	Cassell Coliseum (250); Blacksburg, VA
ACC Women's Tournament
March 4, 2021; Noon, RSN	(8)	vs. (9) Wake Forest; Second Round	L 72–81	13–10	Greensboro Coliseum (609); Greensboro, NC
NCAA Women's Tournament
March 22, 2021; Noon, ESPN	(10 H)	vs. (7 H) Alabama; First Round	L 71–80	13–11	Alamodome; San Antonio, TX
*Non-conference game. ^{#}Rankings from AP Poll. (#) Tournament seedings in parentheses. H=HemisFair. All times are in Eastern.

== Rankings ==
Regular season polls
Poll	Pre- season	Week 2	Week 3	Week 4	Week 5	Week 6	Week 7	Week 8	Week 9	Week 10	Week 11	Week 12	Week 13	Week 14	Week 15	Week 16	Week 17	Week 18	Week 19	Final
AP	RV	RV	RV	RV	RV	RV	RV	RV												
Coaches	RV	RV		RV	RV	RV								RV						

Legend
	Increase in ranking
	Decrease in ranking
	Not ranked previous week
(RV)	Received votes

== See also ==
- 2020–21 North Carolina Tar Heels men's basketball team
