= 2020–21 Virginia Cavaliers women's basketball team =

Intercollegiate basketball season

2020–21 Virginia Cavaliers women's basketball
- Conference: Atlantic Coast Conference
- Record: 0–5 (0–2 ACC)
- Head coach: Tina Thompson (3rd season)
- Assistant coaches: Karleen Thompson; Walter Pitts; Monica Wright
- Home arena: John Paul Jones Arena

2020–21 ACC women's basketball standings
	Conf.				Overall
Team	W		L	PCT	W		L	PCT
No. 8 Louisville	14	–	2	.875	26	–	4	.867
No. 3 NC State†	12	–	2	.857	22	–	3	.880
Georgia Tech	12	–	6	.667	17	–	9	.654
Syracuse	9	–	7	.563	15	–	9	.625
Florida State	9	–	7	.563	10	–	9	.526
Notre Dame	8	–	7	.533	10	–	10	.500
Virginia Tech	8	–	8	.500	15	–	10	.600
North Carolina	8	–	9	.471	13	–	11	.542
Miami (FL)	8	–	10	.444	11	–	11	.500
Wake Forest	8	–	10	.444	12	–	13	.480
Clemson	5	–	12	.294	12	–	14	.462
Pittsburgh	3	–	12	.200	5	–	14	.263
Boston College	2	–	11	.154	7	–	12	.368
Duke	0	–	1	.000	3	–	1	.750
Virginia	0	–	2	.000	0	–	5	.000
† 2021 ACC tournament winner Duke suspended their season on December 25, 2020; Virginia suspended their season on January 14, 2021; As of March 30, 2021; Rankings from AP poll

The 2020–21 Virginia Cavaliers women's basketball team represented the University of Virginia during the 2020–21 NCAA Division I women's basketball season. The Cavaliers were led by third year head coach Tina Thompson, and played their home games at John Paul Jones Arena as members the Atlantic Coast Conference.

On January 14, 2021, it was announced that the team would end their season due to COVID-19 concerns. Virginia was the second team in the Atlantic Coast Conference to suspend their season, after Duke did so on December 25, 2020.

The Cavaliers finished the season 0–5, and 0–2 in ACC play. Due to their season cancellation they did not participate in the ACC tournament, NCAA tournament or WNIT.

== Previous season ==
The 2019–20 Cavaliers finished the season 13–17 and 8–10 in ACC play to finish in ninth place. As the ninth seed in the ACC tournament, they lost to Syracuse in Second Round. The NCAA tournament and WNIT were cancelled due to the COVID-19 outbreak.

== Offseason ==
=== Departures ===
Name	Number	Pos.	Height	Year	Hometown	Reason for departure
Dominique Toussaint	4	G	5'9"	Senior	Staten Island, NY	Graduated
Shemera Williams	10	G	5'8"	Freshman	Milwaukee, WI	Transferred to USC
Jocelyn Willoughby	13	G/F	6'0"	Senior	East Orange, NJ	Graduated
Lisa Jablonowski	14	F	6'3"	Senior	Ernster, Luxembourg	Graduated
Kylie Kornegay-Lucas	15	G	5'10"	Freshman	Camden, DE	Transferred
Felicia Aiyeotan	30	C	6'9"	Senior	Lagos, Nigeria	Graduated

=== Incoming transfers ===
Name	Number	Pos.	Height	Year	Hometown	Previous school
London Clarkson	34	F	6'2"	Sophomore	Pflugerville, TX	Florida State
Emily Maupin	35	F	6'3"	Graduate Student	Charlottesville, VA	Liberty

=== Recruiting class ===
College recruiting
Name	Hometown	School	Height	Weight	Commit date
Kaydan Lawson; PG	Cleveland, OH	Orange	5 ft 11 in (1.80 m)	N/A	
Kaydan Lawson; PG	Recruit ratings: ESPN: (90)				
Nycerra Minnis; F	Riverdale, MD	Herndon	6 ft 3 in (1.91 m)	N/A	
Nycerra Minnis; F	Recruit ratings: ESPN: (89)				
Zaria Johnson; G	Houston, TX	Fort Bend Hightower	6 ft 0 in (1.83 m)	N/A	
Zaria Johnson; G	Recruit ratings: ESPN: (88)				
Overall recruit ranking:
Note: In many cases, Scout, Rivals, 247Sports, On3, and ESPN may conflict in their listings of height and weight.; In these cases, the average was taken. ESPN grades are on a 100-point scale.; Sources:

== Roster ==
2020–21 Virginia Cavaliers women's basketball team
Players
Coaches

Pos.	#	Name	Height	Year	Previous school	Hometown
G	0	Dylan Horton	5 ft 9 in (1.75 m)	So	Redondo Union	Los Angeles, CA
G	1	Carole Miller	6 ft 0 in (1.83 m)	So	Thomas Edison	Alexandria, VA
G	3	Aaliyah Pitts	6 ft 0 in (1.83 m)	Fr	Bishop McNamara	Suitland, MD
G	4	Zaria Johnson	6 ft 0 in (1.83 m)	Fr	Fort Bend Hightower	Houston, TX
F	5	Tihana Stojsavljevic	6 ft 3 in (1.91 m)	GS	Tresnjevka; Texas Tech	Zagreb, Croatia
F	12	Meg Jefferson	6 ft 3 in (1.91 m)	So	St Columba's Catholic College	Sydney, Australia
F	13	Deja Bristol	6 ft 1 in (1.85 m)	Fr	New Hope Academy	Upper Marlboro, MD
G	14	Kaydan Lawson	6 ft 0 in (1.83 m)	Fr	Orange	Cleveland, OH
G	21	Dani Lawson	6 ft 2 in (1.88 m)	Jr	Hathaway Brown; Purdue	Cleveland, OH
G	23	Amandine Toi	5 ft 10 in (1.78 m)	RS So	INSEP Academy	Paris, France
F	32	Nycerra Minnis	6 ft 3 in (1.91 m)	Fr	Herndon	Riverdale, MD
F	34	London Clarkson	6 ft 2 in (1.88 m)	So	Pflugerville; Florida State	Pflugerville, TX
F	35	Emily Maupin	6 ft 3 in (1.91 m)	GS	Covenant School; Elon/Liberty	Charlottesville, VA

Head coach

- Tina Thompson (USC)

Assistant coach(es)

- Karleen Thompson (USC)
- Walter Pitts (Alabama)
- Monica Wright (Virginia)

Legend

- (C) Team captain
- (S) Suspended
- (I) Ineligible
- (W) Walk-on
- Injured
- Current redshirt

Roster
Last update: December 8, 2020

== Schedule ==
Date time, TV	Rank^{#}	Opponent^{#}	Result	Record	Site (attendance) city, state
Non-conference regular season
November 25, 2020*; 6:00 p.m.		at UCF	L 34–60	0–1	Addition Financial Arena (782); Orlando, FL
November 29, 2020*; 1:00 p.m., ACCNX		East Carolina	L 51–54	0–2	John Paul Jones Arena (250); Charlottesville, VA
December 3, 2020*; 7:00 p.m., ACCNX		James Madison	L 67–71	0–3	John Paul Jones Arena (250); Charlottesville, VA
December 6, 2020*		at George Washington	Cancelled due to injury issues		Charles E. Smith Center; Washington, D.C.
ACC regular season
December 10, 2020; 3:00 p.m., ACCNX		Clemson	L 55–71	0–4 (0–1)	John Paul Jones Arena (250); Charlottesville, VA
December 13, 2020; 1:00 p.m., RSN		at Florida State	L 51–69	0–5 (0–2)	Donald L. Tucker Center (977); Tallahassee, FL
December 20, 2020; Noon, ACCN		at Virginia Tech	Season Canceled		Cassell Coliseum; Blacksburg, VA
January 3, 2021; Noon, ACCN		No. 2 Louisville	Season Canceled		John Paul Jones Arena; Charlottesville, VA
January 7, 2021; 6:00 p.m., ACCNX		at No. 24 Syracuse	Season Canceled		Carrier Dome; Syracuse, NY
January 12, 2021; 6:00 p.m., ACCNX		Wake Forest	Season Canceled		John Paul Jones Arena; Charlottesville, VA
January 14, 2021; 7:00 p.m., ACCNX		at No. 3 NC State	Season Canceled		Reynolds Coliseum; Raleigh, NC
January 17, 2021; 1:00 p.m., ACCNX		Georgia Tech	Season Canceled		John Paul Jones Arena; Charlottesville, VA
January 21, 2021; 6:00 p.m., ACCNX		North Carolina	Season Canceled		John Paul Jones Arena; Charlottesville, VA
January 24, 2021; 1:00 p.m., ACCNX		Florida State	Season Canceled		John Paul Jones Arena; Charlottesville, VA
January 28, 2021; 7:00 p.m., RSN		at Clemson	Season Canceled		Littlejohn Coliseum; Clemson, SC
January 31, 2021; 2:00 p.m., ACCNX		at Pittsburgh	Season Canceled		Peterson Events Center; Pittsburgh, PA
February 2, 2021; 6:00 p.m.		at Virginia Tech	Season Canceled		Cassell Coliseum; Blacksburg, VA
February 4, 2021; 7:00 p.m., ACCNX		Duke	Season Canceled		John Paul Jones Arena; Charlottesville, VA
February 7, 2021; 4:00 p.m., ACCN		Boston College	Season Canceled		John Paul Jones Arena; Charlottesville, VA
February 11, 2021; 7:00 p.m., ACCNX		at Notre Dame	Season Canceled		Purcell Pavilion; Notre Dame, IN
February 14, 2021; 4:00 p.m., ACCN		at North Carolina	Season Canceled		Carmichael Arena; Chapel Hill, NC
February 18, 2021; 7:00 p.m., ACCNX		NC State	Season Canceled		John Paul Jones Arena; Charlottesville, VA
February 21, 2021; 4:00 p.m., ACCN		at Miami (FL)	Season Canceled		Watsco Center; Coral Gables, FL
February 25, 2021; 7:00 p.m., ACCNX		at Duke	Season Canceled		Cameron Indoor Stadium; Durham, NC
February 28, 2021; 1:00 p.m., ACCNX		Virginia Tech	Season Canceled		John Paul Jones Arena; Charlottesville, VA
*Non-conference game. ^{#}Rankings from AP Poll. (#) Tournament seedings in parentheses. All times are in Eastern.

== Rankings ==
Regular season polls
Poll	Pre- Season	Week 2	Week 3	Week 4	Week 5	Week 6	Week 7	Week 8	Week 9	Week 10	Week 11	Week 12	Week 13	Week 14	Week 15	Week 16	Final
AP																	
Coaches																	

Legend
	Increase in ranking
	Decrease in ranking
	Not ranked previous week
(RV)	Received Votes

== See also ==
- 2020–21 Virginia Cavaliers men's basketball team
