= 2020–21 Syracuse Orange women's basketball team =

Intercollegiate basketball season

2020–21 Syracuse Orange women's basketball

NCAA tournament, second round
- Conference: Atlantic Coast Conference
- Record: 15–9 (9–7 ACC)
- Head coach: Quentin Hillsman (15th season)
- Assistant coaches: Vonn Read; John Marcum; Cedric Solice
- Home arena: Carrier Dome

2020–21 ACC women's basketball standings
	Conf.				Overall
Team	W		L	PCT	W		L	PCT
No. 8 Louisville	14	–	2	.875	26	–	4	.867
No. 3 NC State†	12	–	2	.857	22	–	3	.880
Georgia Tech	12	–	6	.667	17	–	9	.654
Syracuse	9	–	7	.563	15	–	9	.625
Florida State	9	–	7	.563	10	–	9	.526
Notre Dame	8	–	7	.533	10	–	10	.500
Virginia Tech	8	–	8	.500	15	–	10	.600
North Carolina	8	–	9	.471	13	–	11	.542
Miami (FL)	8	–	10	.444	11	–	11	.500
Wake Forest	8	–	10	.444	12	–	13	.480
Clemson	5	–	12	.294	12	–	14	.462
Pittsburgh	3	–	12	.200	5	–	14	.263
Boston College	2	–	11	.154	7	–	12	.368
Duke	0	–	1	.000	3	–	1	.750
Virginia	0	–	2	.000	0	–	5	.000
† 2021 ACC tournament winner Duke suspended their season on December 25, 2020; Virginia suspended their season on January 14, 2021; As of March 30, 2021; Rankings from AP poll

The 2020–21 Syracuse Orange women's basketball team represented Syracuse University during the 2020–21 NCAA Division I women's basketball season. The Orange were led by fifteenth year head coach Quentin Hillsman. The Orange were eighth year members of the Atlantic Coast Conference and played their home games at the Carrier Dome in Syracuse, New York.

The Orange finished the season 15–9 and 9–7 in ACC play to finish in a tie for fourth place. As the fifth seed in the ACC tournament, they defeated to Boston College in the Second Round and Florida State in the Quarterfinals before losing to Louisville in the Semifinals. They received an at-large bid to the NCAA tournament where they were the eight seed in the Riverwalk Regional. In the tournament they defeated nine seed South Dakota State in the First Round before losing to one seed UConn to end their season.

== Previous season ==
For the 2019–20 season, the Orange finished 16–15 overall record and a 9–9 in record ACC play securing an eighth-place finish. As the eighth seed in the ACC tournament, they defeated Virginia in the Second Round before losing to Louisville in Quarterfinals. The NCAA tournament and WNIT were cancelled due to the COVID-19 outbreak.

== Off-season ==
=== Departures ===
Name	Number	Pos.	Height	Year	Hometown	Reason for departure
Elemy Colomé	0	G	5'8"	Graduate Student	Lawrence, MA	Graduated
Whisper Fisher	2	F	6'2"	Graduate Student	Owings Mills, MD	Graduated
Alisha Lewis	10	G	5'7"	Freshman	Wallingford, PA	Transferred to UCF
Gabrielle Cooper	11	G	5'10"	Senior	Lansing, IL	Graduated
Brooke Alexander	12	G	6'0"	Graduate Student	Frisco, TX	Graduated

=== Recruiting class ===
College recruiting information
Name	Hometown	School	Height	Weight	Commit date
Kamilla Cardoso; C	Montes Claros, Brazil	Hamilton Heights Christian Academy	6 ft 7 in (2.01 m)	N/A	
Kamilla Cardoso; C	Recruit ratings: ESPN: (98)				
Priscilla Williams; G	Branson, MO	Branson	6 ft 2 in (1.88 m)	N/A	
Priscilla Williams; G	Recruit ratings: ESPN: (98)				
Faith Blackstone; G	Harrisburg, PA	Hillside	6 ft 0 in (1.83 m)	N/A	
Faith Blackstone; G	Recruit ratings: ESPN: (94)				
Maud Huijbens; F	Hilversum, Netherlands	Hilversum	6 ft 5 in (1.96 m)	N/A	
Maud Huijbens; F	Recruit ratings: ESPN: (90)				
Khamya McNeal; G	Milwaukee, WI	Rufus King	5 ft 8 in (1.73 m)	N/A	
Khamya McNeal; G	Recruit ratings: ESPN: (90)				
Laura Salmeron; PG	Spain	N/A	5 ft 9 in (1.75 m)	N/A	
Laura Salmeron; PG	Recruit ratings: ESPN: (90)				
Kiara Fisher; PG	Elmira, NY	Elmira	5 ft 7 in (1.70 m)	N/A	
Kiara Fisher; PG	Recruit ratings: ESPN: (89)				
Overall recruit ranking:
Note: In many cases, Scout, Rivals, 247Sports, On3, and ESPN may conflict in their listings of height and weight.; In these cases, the average was taken. ESPN grades are on a 100-point scale.; Sources:

== Roster ==
2020–21 Syracuse Orange women's basketball team
Players
Coaches

Pos.	#	Name	Height	Year	Previous school	Hometown
G	0	Ava Irvin	5 ft 8 in (1.73 m)	Fr	Greater Atlanta Christian School	Atlanta, GA
G	1	Taleah Washington	5 ft 7 in (1.7 m)	So	Rock Creek Christian Academy	District Heights, MD
G	2	Priscilla Williams	6 ft 2 in (1.88 m)	Fr	Branson	Branson, MO
F	3	Maeva Djaldi–Tabdi	6 ft 2 in (1.88 m)	RS Jr	Jean Moulin	Paris, France
G	4	Tiana Mangakahia	5 ft 6 in (1.68 m)	GS	Lake Ginninderra	Meadowbrook, QLD, Australia
G	5	Teisha Hyman	5 ft 8 in (1.73 m)	So	Woodlands	White Plains, NY
G	11	Khamya McNeal	5 ft 8 in (1.73 m)	Fr	Rufus King	Milwaukee, WI
G	12	Faith Blackstone	6 ft 0 in (1.83 m)	Fr	Hillside	Harrisburg, PA
F	13	Maud Huijbens	6 ft 5 in (1.96 m)	Fr	Hilversum	Hilversum, Netherlands
C	14	Kamilla Cardoso	6 ft 7 in (2.01 m)	Fr	Hamilton Heights Christian Academy	Montes Claros, Brazil
G	15	Kiara Fisher	5 ft 7 in (1.7 m)	Fr	Elmira	Elmira, NY
G	21	Emily Engstler	6 ft 0 in (1.83 m)	Jr	St. Francis Prep	Fresh Meadows, NY
C	22	Amaya Finklea–Guity	6 ft 4 in (1.93 m)	Sr	Noble & Greenough	Dorchester, MA
G	23	Kiara Lewis	5 ft 8 in (1.73 m)	RS Sr	Whitney Young	Chicago, IL
G	25	Lauren Fitzmaurice	5 ft 8 in (1.73 m)	Sr	Liberty Bell	Mazama, WA
F	45	Digna Strautmane	6 ft 2 in (1.88 m)	Sr	Riga 66	Riga, Latvia

Head coach

- Quentin Hillsman (St. Mary's (MD))

Assistant coach(es)

- Vonn Read (Clark Atlanta)
- John Marcum (Oklahoma Baptist)
- Cedric Solice (Charleston Southern)

Legend

- (C) Team captain
- (S) Suspended
- (I) Ineligible
- (W) Walk-on
- Injured
- Current redshirt

Roster
Last update: December 8, 2020

== Schedule ==
Date time, TV	Rank^{#}	Opponent^{#}	Result	Record	Site (attendance) city, state
Regular Season
November 29, 2020*; 2:00 p.m.	No. 23	Stony Brook	W 50–39	1–0	Island Federal Credit Union Arena (0); Stony Brook, NY
December 2, 2020*; 6:00 p.m.	No. 22	Lincoln	W 90–39	2–0	Carrier Dome (0); Syracuse, NY
December 6, 2020*; 2:00 p.m., ACCN	No. 22	Penn State	W 82–72	3–0	Carrier Dome (0); Syracuse, NY
December 10, 2020; 8:00 p.m., ACCN	No. 20	at Miami (FL)	W 69–58	4–0 (1–0)	Watsco Center (0); Coral Gables, FL
December 17, 2020; 6:00 p.m., ACCNX	No. 18	at North Carolina	L 68–92	4–1 (1–1)	Carmichael Arena (0); Chapel Hill, NC
December 20, 2020; 2:00 p.m., ACCN	No. 18	at Boston College	W 83–70	5–1 (2–1)	Conte Forum (0); Chestnut Hill, MA
December 28, 2020*; 7:00 p.m., ACCNN	No. 22	Morgan State	Canceled		Carrier Dome; Syracuse, NY
December 31, 2020; 2:00 p.m., ACCNX	No. 22	North Carolina	Postponed		Carrier Dome; Syracuse, NY
January 7, 2021; 6:00 p.m., ACCNX	No. 24	Virginia	Postponed		Carrier Dome; Syracuse, NY
January 10, 2021; 2:00 p.m., ESPNU	No. 24	Notre Dame	Postponed		Carrier Dome; Syracuse, NY
January 14, 2021; 2:00 p.m., ACCNX	No. 24	at Georgia Tech	Postponed		McCamish Pavilion; Atlanta, GA
January 17, 2021; Noon, RSN	No. 24	Miami (FL)	W 99–64	6–1 (3–1)	Carrier Dome (0); Syracuse, NY
January 19, 2021; Noon, ACCN	No. 23	North Carolina	W 88–76	7–1 (4–1)	Carrier Dome (0); Syracuse, NY
January 21, 2021; 7:00 p.m., ACCNX	No. 23	at Duke	Canceled		Cameron Indoor Stadium; Durham, NC
January 21, 2021; 9:00 p.m., ESPN2	No. 23	at No. 1 Louisville	L 54–67	7–2 (4–2)	KFC Yum! Center (2,643); Louisville, KY
January 24, 2021; Noon, ACCN	No. 23	at Clemson	L 77–86 ^{OT}	7–3 (4–3)	Littlejohn Coliseum (421); Clemson, SC
January 28, 2021; 6:00 p.m., ACCNX		Pittsburgh	W 80–57	8–3 (5–3)	Carrier Dome (0); Syracuse, NY
January 31, 2021; 11:00 a.m., ACCN		Notre Dame	W 81–69	9–3 (6–3)	Carrier Dome (0); Syracuse, NY
February 2, 2021; 7:00 p.m., ACCNX		at Georgia Tech	L 63–76	9–4 (6–4)	McCamish Pavilion (1,200); Atlanta, GA
February 4, 2021; 6:00 p.m., ACCN		Wake Forest	W 85–78	10–4 (7–4)	Carrier Dome (0); Syracuse, NY
February 7, 2021; 2:00 p.m., RSN		at Pittsburgh	W 71–67	11–4 (8–4)	Petersen Events Center (500); Pittsburgh, PA
February 11, 2021; 8:00 p.m., ACCN		at Florida State	L 52–67	11–5 (8–5)	Donald L. Tucker Center (1,156); Tallahassee, FL
February 14, 2021; 1:00 p.m., ESPN2		No. 3 Louisville	Postponed		Carrier Dome; Syracuse, NY
February 18, 2021; 8:00 p.m., ACCN		at Notre Dame	Postponed		Purcell Pavilion; Notre Dame, IN
February 21, 2021; Noon, RSN		at Virginia Tech	L 68–76	11–6 (8–6)	Cassell Coliseum (250); Blacksburg, VA
February 25, 2021; 8:00 p.m., ACCN		Boston College	W 92–75	12–6 (9–6)	Carrier Dome (0); Syracuse, NY
February 28, 2021; Noon, ACCN		No. 2 NC State	L 61–68	12–7 (9–7)	Carrier Dome (0); Syracuse, NY
ACC Women's Tournament
March 4, 2021; 2:30 p.m., RSN	(5)	vs. (13) Boston College; Second Round	W 67–61	13–7	Greensboro Coliseum (609); Greensboro, NC
March 5, 2021; 2:30 p.m., RSN	(5)	vs. (4) Florida State; Quarterfinals	W 68–67	14–7	Greensboro Coliseum (592); Greensboro, NC
March 6, 2021; Noon, ACCN	(5)	vs. (1) No. 5 Louisville; Semifinals	L 59–72	14–8	Greensboro Coliseum (1,122); Greensboro, NC
NCAA tournament
March 21, 2021; 5:30 p.m., ESPN2	(8 R)	vs. (9 R) South Dakota State; First Round	W 72–55	15–8	Frank Erwin Center; Austin, TX
March 23, 2021; 9:00 p.m., ESPN2	(8 R)	vs. (1 R) No. 1 UConn; First Round	L 47–83	15–9	Alamodome; San Antonio, TX
*Non-conference game. ^{#}Rankings from AP Poll. (#) Tournament seedings in parentheses. R=Riverwalk. All times are in Eastern.

== Rankings ==
Regular season polls
Poll	Pre- Season	Week 2	Week 3	Week 4	Week 5	Week 6	Week 7	Week 8	Week 9	Week 10	Week 11	Week 12	Week 13	Week 14	Week 15	Week 16	Week 17	Week 18	Week 19	Final
AP	23	22	20	18	22	22	24	24	23	RV	RV	RV								N/A
Coaches	21	18	16	20т	20	20	21	20	RV	RV	RV									

Legend
	Increase in ranking
	Decrease in ranking
	Not ranked previous week
(RV)	Received Votes

The Coaches Poll releases a final poll after the NCAA tournament, but the AP Poll does not release a poll at this time.

== See also ==
- 2020–21 Syracuse Orange men's basketball team
