= 2020–21 Georgia Tech Yellow Jackets women's basketball team =

Intercollegiate basketball season

2020–21 Georgia Tech Yellow Jackets women's basketball

NCAA tournament, Sweet Sixteen
- Conference: Atlantic Coast Conference

Ranking
- Coaches: No. 22
- AP: No. RV
- Record: 17–9 (12–6 ACC)
- Head coach: Nell Fortner (2nd season)
- Assistant coaches: Tasha Butts; Blanche Alverson; Murriel Page
- Home arena: McCamish Pavilion

2020–21 ACC women's basketball standings
| | Conf. | | | | Overall |
| Team | W | | L | PCT | W | | L | PCT |
|---|---|---|---|---|---|---|---|---|
| No. 8 Louisville | 14 | – | 2 | .875 | 26 | – | 4 | .867 |
| No. 3 NC State† | 12 | – | 2 | .857 | 22 | – | 3 | .880 |
| Georgia Tech | 12 | – | 6 | .667 | 17 | – | 9 | .654 |
| Syracuse | 9 | – | 7 | .563 | 15 | – | 9 | .625 |
| Florida State | 9 | – | 7 | .563 | 10 | – | 9 | .526 |
| Notre Dame | 8 | – | 7 | .533 | 10 | – | 10 | .500 |
| Virginia Tech | 8 | – | 8 | .500 | 15 | – | 10 | .600 |
| North Carolina | 8 | – | 9 | .471 | 13 | – | 11 | .542 |
| Miami (FL) | 8 | – | 10 | .444 | 11 | – | 11 | .500 |
| Wake Forest | 8 | – | 10 | .444 | 12 | – | 13 | .480 |
| Clemson | 5 | – | 12 | .294 | 12 | – | 14 | .462 |
| Pittsburgh | 3 | – | 12 | .200 | 5 | – | 14 | .263 |
| Boston College | 2 | – | 11 | .154 | 7 | – | 12 | .368 |
| Duke | 0 | – | 1 | .000 | 3 | – | 1 | .750 |
| Virginia | 0 | – | 2 | .000 | 0 | – | 5 | .000 |
† 2021 ACC tournament winner Duke suspended their season on December 25, 2020; Virginia suspended their season on January 14, 2021; As of March 30, 2021; Rankings from AP poll

The 2020–21 Georgia Tech Yellow Jackets women's basketball team represented Georgia Institute of Technology during the 2020-21 NCAA Division I women's basketball season. They were led by second-year head coach Nell Fortner and played their home games at McCamish Pavilion as members of the Atlantic Coast Conference.

The Yellow Jackets finished the season 17–9 and 12–6 in ACC play to finish in third place. In the ACC tournament, they defeated to Clemson in the Quarterfinals before losing to eventual champions NC State in the Semifinals. They received an at-large bid to the NCAA tournament where they were the five seed in the HemisFair Regional. In the tournament they defeated twelve seed Stephen F. Austin in the First Round and four seed West Virginia before losing to one seed South Carolina in the Sweet Sixteen to end their season.

== Previous season ==
They finished the 2019–20 season 20–11 and 10–8 in ACC play to finish in seventh place. As the seventh seed in the ACC tournament, they defeated Pittsburgh in the Second Round before losing to eventual champion NC State in Quarterfinals. The NCAA tournament and WNIT were cancelled due to the COVID-19 outbreak.

== Off-season ==
=== Departures ===
| Name | Number | Pos. | Height | Year | Hometown | Reason for Departure |
|---|---|---|---|---|---|---|
| Daijah Jefferson | 00 | F | 6'2" | (redshirt) Sophomore | Hopewell, VA | Transferred to George Mason |
| Jasmine Carson | 2 | G | 5'10" | Sophomore | Memphis, TN | Transferred to West Virginia |
| Anne Francoise Diouf | 4 | G | 6'4" | (redshirt) Junior | Dakar, Senegal | Transferred to James Madison |
| Chanin Scott | 24 | G | 6'0" | Senior | Charlotte, NC | Graduated |
| Francesca Pan | 33 | G | 6'1" | Senior | Bassano del Grappa, Italy | Graduated |

=== Recruiting class ===
College recruiting information
| Name | Hometown | School | Height | Weight | Commit date |
|---|---|---|---|---|---|
| Anaya Boyd; G | McDonough, Georgia | Lovejoy | 5 ft 11 in (1.80 m) | N/A | |
| Anaya Boyd; G | Recruit ratings: ESPN: (97) | | | | |
| Eylia Love; G | Kansas City, Missouri | Olathe North | 6 ft 0 in (1.83 m) | N/A | |
| Eylia Love; G | Recruit ratings: ESPN: (95) | | | | |
| Avyonce Carter; G | Norcross, Georgia | Wesleyan | 5 ft 10 in (1.78 m) | N/A | |
| Avyonce Carter; G | Recruit ratings: ESPN: (95) | | | | |
| Loyal McQueen; PG | Florence, South Carolina | Wilson | 5 ft 8 in (1.73 m) | N/A | |
| Loyal McQueen; PG | Recruit ratings: ESPN: (95) | | | | |
Overall recruit ranking:
Note: In many cases, Scout, Rivals, 247Sports, On3, and ESPN may conflict in their listings of height and weight.; In these cases, the average was taken. ESPN grades are on a 100-point scale.; Sources:

== Roster ==
2020–21 Georgia Tech Yellow Jackets women's basketball team
Players
Coaches

| Pos. | # | Name | Height | Year | Previous school | Hometown |
|---|---|---|---|---|---|---|
| G | 00 | Loyal McQueen | 5 ft 8 in (1.73 m) | Fr | Wilson | Florence, SC |
| G | 3 | Sarah Bates | 5 ft 9 in (1.75 m) | RS Jr | Kansas State | Fresno, California |
| G | 4 | Anaya Boyd | 5 ft 10 in (1.78 m) | Fr | Lovejoy | McDonough, GA |
| F | 11 | Aixa Wone Aranaz | 6 ft 3 in (1.91 m) | So | Ohio State | Pamplona, Spain |
| G | 12 | Kondalia Montgomery | 5 ft 7 in (1.7 m) | Jr | Lincoln | Tacoma, WA |
| G | 13 | Lorela Cubaj | 6 ft 4 in (1.93 m) | Sr | Istituto Paritario G. Parini | Terni, Italy |
| G | 14 | Anisa Clark | 5 ft 7 in (1.7 m) | Fr | Union Grove | McDonough, GA |
| G | 15 | Avyonce Carter | 5 ft 10 in (1.78 m) | Fr | Wesleyan | Norcross, GA |
| C | 20 | Nerea Hermosa | 6 ft 5 in (1.96 m) | So | IES Joaquim Blume | Victoria, Spain |
| F/C | 21 | Ronni Nwora | 6 ft 2 in (1.88 m) | RS Fr | The Park School of Buffalo | Buffalo, New York |
| G/F | 24 | Eylia Love | 6 ft 1 in (1.85 m) | Fr | Olathe North | Kansas City, MO |
| G | 31 | Lotta-Maj Lahtinen | 5 ft 7 in (1.7 m) | Jr | None | Helsinki, Finland |
| G | 41 | Kierra Fletcher | 5 ft 9 in (1.75 m) | Sr | Warren Cousino | Warren, MI |

Head coach

- Nell Fortner (Texas)

Assistant coach(es)

- Tasha Butts (Tennessee)
- Blanche Alverson (Auburn)
- Murriel Page (Florida)

Legend

- (C) Team captain
- (S) Suspended
- (I) Ineligible
- (W) Walk-on
- Injured
- Current redshirt

Roster
Last update: December 2, 2020

== Schedule ==
| Date time, TV | Rank^{#} | Opponent^{#} | Result | Record | Site (attendance) city, state |
Regular Season
| November 25, 2020*; Noon | | Georgia State | W 62–38 | 1–0 | McCamish Pavilion (1,200); Atlanta, GA |
| November 29, 2020*; 2:00 p.m., ACCN | | Georgia; Rivalry | L 69–75 ^{OT} | 1–1 | McCamish Pavilion (1,200); Atlanta, GA |
| December 3, 2020*; 6:00 p.m., ACCNX | | Tulane | W 55–51 | 2–1 | McCamish Pavilion (1,200); Atlanta, GA |
| December 9, 2020; 11:00 a.m., ACCNX | | Boston College | W 86–68 | 3–1 (1–0) | McCamish Pavilion (1,200); Atlanta, GA |
| December 13, 2020; 2:00 p.m., ACCNX | | at Notre Dame | W 82–67 | 4–1 (2–0) | Purcell Pavilion (93); Notre Dame, IN |
| December 17, 2020; 7:00 p.m., ACCNX | | Miami (FL) | Postponed | | McCamish Pavilion; Atlanta, GA |
| December 21, 2020*; 2:00 p.m., ACCN | | UCF | Postponed | | McCamish Pavilion; Atlanta, GA |
| December 31, 2020; 7:00 p.m., RSN | | No. 3 NC State | L 75–84 | 4–2 (2–1) | McCamish Pavilion (1,200); Atlanta, GA |
| January 3, 2021; 4:00 p.m., ACCN | | at Notre Dame | L 67–69 | 4–3 (2–2) | Purcell Pavilion (53); Notre Dame, IN |
| January 7, 2021; 7:00 p.m., ACCNX | | at Clemson | W 67–55 | 5–3 (3–2) | Littlejohn Coliseum (452); Clemson, SC |
| January 10, 2021; 2:00 p.m., ACCNX | | Virginia Tech | W 56–54 | 6–3 (4–2) | McCamish Pavilion (1,200); Atlanta, GA |
| January 14, 2021; 6:00 p.m., ACCN | | No. 24 Syracuse | Postponed | | McCamish Pavilion; Atlanta, GA |
| January 17, 2021; 1:00 p.m., ACCNX | | at Virginia | Postponed | | John Paul Jones Arena; Charlottesville, VA |
| January 21, 2021; 8:00 p.m., ACCN | | at Wake Forest | W 73–44 | 7–3 (5–2) | LJVM Coliseum (0); Winston–Salem, NC |
| January 24, 2021; 1:00 p.m., ACCNX | | Florida State | W 66–58 | 8–3 (6–2) | McCamish Pavilion (1,200); Atlanta, GA |
| January 28, 2021; 7:00 p.m., ACCNX | | at Miami (FL) | W 70–56 | 9–3 (7–2) | Watsco Center (0); Coral Gables, FL |
| February 2, 2021; 7:00 p.m., ACCNX | | Syracuse | W 76–63 | 10–3 (8–2) | McCamish Pavilion (1,200); Atlanta, GA |
| February 4, 2021; 7:00 p.m., ACCNX | | Clemson | W 71–69 | 11–3 (9–2) | McCamish Pavilion (1,200); Atlanta, GA |
| February 7, 2021; Noon, RSN | | Wake Forest | L 52–61 | 11–4 (9–3) | McCamish Pavilion (1,200); Atlanta, GA |
| February 11, 2021; 7:00 p.m., ACCNX | | at No. 3 Louisville | L 70–85 | 11–5 (9–4) | KFC Yum! Center (2,914); Louisville, KY |
| February 16, 2021; Noon, ACCN | | Miami (FL) | W 67–56 | 12–5 (10–4) | McCamish Pavilion (1,200); Atlanta, GA |
| February 18, 2021; 6:00 p.m., ACCN | | at Florida State | W 62–48 | 13–5 (11–4) | Donald L. Tucker Center (1,128); Tallahassee, FL |
| February 21, 2021; 2:00 p.m., RSN | | at Boston College | L 43–49 | 13–6 (11–5) | Conte Forum (0); Chestnut Hill, MA |
| February 25, 2021; 6:00 p.m., ACCNX | | at North Carolina | L 59–84 | 13–7 (11–6) | Carmichael Arena (0); Chapel Hill, NC |
| February 28, 2021; 2:00 p.m., ACCN | | Pittsburgh | W 65–60 | 14–7 (12–6) | McCamish Pavilion (1,200); Atlanta, GA |
ACC Women's Tournament
| March 5, 2021; 8:30 p.m., RSN | (3) | vs. (11) Clemson; Quarterfinals | W 60–57 | 15–7 | Greensboro Coliseum (1,259); Greensboro, NC |
| March 6, 2021; 2:30 p.m., ACCN | (3) | vs. (2) No. 3 NC State; Semifinals | L 61–66 | 15–8 | Greensboro Coliseum (1,122); Greensboro, NC |
NCAA tournament
| March 21, 2021; 4:30 p.m., ESPNU | (5 H) | vs. (12 H) Stephen F. Austin; First Round | W 54–52 ^{OT} | 16–8 | Bill Greehey Arena; San Antonio, TX |
| March 23, 2021; 5:30 p.m., ESPNU | (5 H) | vs. (4 H) No. 17 West Virginia; Second Round | W 73–56 | 17–8 | UTSA Convocation Center; San Antonio, TX |
| March 28, 2021; 1:00 p.m., ABC | (5 H) | vs. (1 H) No. 6 South Carolina; Sweet Sixteen | L 65–76 | 17–9 | Alamodome; San Antonio, TX |
*Non-conference game. ^{#}Rankings from AP Poll,. (#) Tournament seedings in parentheses. H=HemisFair. All times are in Eastern Time.

== Rankings ==
Regular season polls
| Poll | Pre- Season | Week 2 | Week 3 | Week 4 | Week 5 | Week 6 | Week 7 | Week 8 | Week 9 | Week 10 | Week 11 | Week 12 | Week 13 | Week 14 | Week 15 | Week 16 | Final |
|---|---|---|---|---|---|---|---|---|---|---|---|---|---|---|---|---|---|
| AP | | | | | RV | RV | | | | RV | RV | RV | RV | RV | RV | RV | RV |
| Coaches | | | | RV | RV | | | | | RV | RV | RV | RV | RV | RV | RV | 22 |

Legend
| | Increase in ranking |
| | Decrease in ranking |
| | Not ranked previous week |
| (RV) | Received Votes |

== See also ==
2020–21 Georgia Tech Yellow Jackets men's basketball team
