= 2020–21 Duke Blue Devils women's basketball team =

Intercollegiate basketball season

2020–21 Duke Blue Devils women's basketball
- Conference: Atlantic Coast Conference
- Record: 3–1 (0–1 ACC)
- Head coach: Kara Lawson (1st season)
- Assistant coaches: Beth Cunningham; Winston Gandy; Tia Jackson
- Home arena: Cameron Indoor Stadium

2020–21 ACC women's basketball standings
	Conf.				Overall
Team	W		L	PCT	W		L	PCT
No. 8 Louisville	14	–	2	.875	26	–	4	.867
No. 3 NC State†	12	–	2	.857	22	–	3	.880
Georgia Tech	12	–	6	.667	17	–	9	.654
Syracuse	9	–	7	.563	15	–	9	.625
Florida State	9	–	7	.563	10	–	9	.526
Notre Dame	8	–	7	.533	10	–	10	.500
Virginia Tech	8	–	8	.500	15	–	10	.600
North Carolina	8	–	9	.471	13	–	11	.542
Miami (FL)	8	–	10	.444	11	–	11	.500
Wake Forest	8	–	10	.444	12	–	13	.480
Clemson	5	–	12	.294	12	–	14	.462
Pittsburgh	3	–	12	.200	5	–	14	.263
Boston College	2	–	11	.154	7	–	12	.368
Duke	0	–	1	.000	3	–	1	.750
Virginia	0	–	2	.000	0	–	5	.000
† 2021 ACC tournament winner Duke suspended their season on December 25, 2020; Virginia suspended their season on January 14, 2021; As of March 30, 2021; Rankings from AP poll

The 2020–21 Duke Blue Devils women's basketball team represented Duke University during the 2020–21 NCAA Division I women's basketball season. The Blue Devils were led by first-year head coach Kara Lawson and played their home games at Cameron Indoor Stadium in Durham, North Carolina as members of the Atlantic Coast Conference.

During the off-season, Duke announced that head coach Joanne McCallie had retired after thirteen years as head coach. On July 11, 2020, Kara Lawson was announced as the new head coach.

On December 25, 2020, it was announced that the team would end their season due to COVID-19 concerns.

The Blue Devils finished the season 3–1, and 0–1 in ACC play. Due to their season cancellation, they did not participate in the ACC tournament, NCAA tournament or WNIT.

== Previous season ==
The 2019-20 Blue Devils finished the season 18–12, 12–6 in ACC play to finish in third place for the regular season. As the third seed in the ACC tournament, they lost to Boston College in the Quarterfinals. The NCAA tournament and WNIT were cancelled due to the COVID-19 outbreak.

== Off-season ==
=== Departures ===
Name	Number	Pos.	Height	Year	Hometown	Reason for departure
Haley Gorecki	2	G	6'0"	Senior	Palatine, IL	Graduated
Leaonna Odom	5	F	6'2"	Senior	Lompoc, CA	Declared for 2020 WNBA draft; drafted 15th overall by New York Liberty
Azana Baines	11	G	6'1"	Freshman	Blackwood, NJ	Transferred to Virginia Tech
Kyra Lambert	15	G	5'9"	Graduate student	Cibolo, TX	Graduated
Emily Schubert	30	C	6'4"	Senior	Elizabethon, TN	Graduated

=== Incoming transfers ===
Name	Number	Pos.	Height	Year	Hometown	Previous school
Sara Anastasieska	11	G	5'11"	Graduate student	Sydney, Australia	Cal
Jiselle Havas	33	G	5'10"	Junior	Windermere, FL	Lafayette

=== Recruiting class ===
College recruiting
Name	Hometown	School	Height	Weight	Commit date
Vanessa DeJesus; PG	Valencia, CA	Sierra Canyon	5 ft 8 in (1.73 m)	N/A	May 21, 2019
Vanessa DeJesus; PG	Recruit ratings: ESPN: (97)				
Overall recruit ranking:
Note: In many cases, Scout, Rivals, 247Sports, On3, and ESPN may conflict in their listings of height and weight.; In these cases, the average was taken. ESPN grades are on a 100-point scale.; Sources:

== Roster ==
2020–21 Duke Blue Devils women's basketball team
Players
Coaches

Pos.	#	Name	Height	Year	Previous school	Hometown
G/F	0	Jaida Patrick	5 ft 10 in (1.78 m)	So	Saddle River Day	West Haverstraw, NY
G	2	Vanessa de Jesus	5 ft 8 in (1.73 m)	Fr	Sierra Canyon	Valencia, CA
G	3	Miela Goodchild	5 ft 10 in (1.78 m)	Jr	Moreton Bay College	Queensland, Australia
G/F	4	Jada Claude	6 ft 0 in (1.83 m)	So	Whitewater	Fayetteville, GA
G	11	Sara Anastasieska	5 ft 11 in (1.8 m)	GS	Monte Sant Angelo Mercy; UTSA; Cal	Sydney, Australia
G	12	Mikayla Boykin	5 ft 9 in (1.75 m)	Sr	Clinton	Clinton, NC
C	13	Uchenna Nwoke	6 ft 6 in (1.98 m)	Jr	South Grand Prairie High School	Grand Prairie, TX
F	22	Jennifer Ezeh	6 ft 3 in (1.91 m)	So	New Hope Academy	Nibo, Nigeria
F/C	24	Onome Akinbode-James	6 ft 3 in (1.91 m)	Jr	Blair Academy	Blairstown, NJ
F/C	25	Jade Williams	6 ft 5 in (1.96 m)	Sr	Owensboro Catholic	Owensboro, KY
G	32	Jayda Adams	6 ft 0 in (1.83 m)	Sr	Mater Dei	Irvine, CA
G	33	Jiselle Havas	5 ft 10 in (1.78 m)	Jr	Lake Highland Prep; Lafayette	Windermere, FL

Head coach

- Kara Lawson (Tennessee)

Assistant coach(es)

- Beth Cunningham (Notre Dame)
- Winston Gandy (Maryland)
- Tia Jackson (Iowa)

Legend

- (C) Team captain
- (S) Suspended
- (I) Ineligible
- (W) Walk-on
- Injured
- Current redshirt

Roster
Last update: December 1, 2020

== Schedule ==
Date time, TV	Rank^{#}	Opponent^{#}	Result	Record	Site (attendance) city, state
Regular season
November 25, 2020*; Noon, ACCN		Longwood	W 94–64	1–0	Cameron Indoor Stadium (0); Durham, NC
November 29, 2020*; Noon, ACCNX		Western Carolina	W 83–56	2–0	Cameron Indoor Stadium (0); Durham, NC
December 5, 2020*; Noon, ACCNX		East Carolina	W 72–47	3–0	Cameron Indoor Stadium (0); Durham, NC
December 9, 2020; 7:00 p.m., RSN		No. 2 Louisville	L 49–73	3–1 (0–1)	Cameron Indoor Stadium (0); Durham, NC
December 13, 2020; 3:00 p.m., RSN		at Miami (FL)	Season canceled		Watsco Center; Coral Gables, FL
December 20, 2020; 4:00 p.m., ACCN		at No. 4 NC State	Season canceled		Reynolds Coliseum; Raleigh, NC
December 22, 2020*; 4:00 p.m., ACCN		UNC Wilmington	Season canceled		Cameron Indoor Stadium; Durham, NC
December 31, 2020; 3:00 p.m., ACCN		No. 2 Louisville	Season canceled		Cameron Indoor Stadium; Durham, NC
January 3, 2021; 2:00 p.m., ACCNX		Virginia Tech	Season canceled		Cameron Indoor Stadium; Durham, NC
January 7, 2021; 7:00 p.m., ACCNX		at Florida State	Season canceled		Donald L. Tucker Center; Tallahassee, FL
January 10, 2021; 2:00 p.m., ACCNX		at Boston College	Season canceled		Conte Forum; Chestnut Hill, MA
January 14, 2021; 7:00 p.m., ACCNX		Clemson	Season canceled		Cameron Indoor Stadium; Durham, NC
January 17, 2021; 2:00 p.m., ACCN		at North Carolina; Rivalry	Season canceled		Carmichael Arena; Chapel Hill, NC
January 21, 2021; 7:00 p.m., ACCNX		Syracuse	Season canceled		Cameron Indoor Stadium; Durham, NC
January 24, 2021; 2:00 p.m., ACCNX		at Georgia Tech	Season canceled		McCamish Pavilion; Atlanta, GA
January 28, 2021; 8:00 p.m., ACCN		NC State	Season canceled		Cameron Indoor Stadium; Durham, NC
January 31, 2021; 4:00 p.m., ACCN		at Notre Dame	Season canceled		Purcell Pavilion; Notre Dame, IN
February 4, 2021; 7:00 p.m., ACCNX		at Virginia	Season canceled		John Paul Jones Arena; Charlottesville, VA
February 7, 2021; 2:00 p.m., ACCNX		Miami (FL)	Season canceled		Cameron Indoor Stadium; Durham, NC
February 14, 2021; 2:00 p.m., ACCNX		Pittsburgh	Season canceled		Cameron Indoor Stadium; Durham, NC
February 18, 2021; 6:00 p.m., ACCNX		at Virginia Tech	Season canceled		Cassell Coliseum; Blacksburg, VA
February 21, 2021; 1:00 p.m.		at Wake Forest	Season canceled		LJVM Coliseum; Winston-Salem, NC
February 25, 2021; 7:00 p.m., ACCNX		Virginia	Season canceled		Cameron Indoor Stadium; Durham, NC
February 28, 2021; 2:00 p.m., RSN		North Carolina; Rivalry	Season canceled		Cameron Indoor Stadium; Durham, NC
*Non-conference game. ^{#}Rankings from AP Poll,. (#) Tournament seedings in parentheses. All times are in Eastern Time.

== Rankings ==
- 2020–21 NCAA Division I women's basketball rankings

Regular season polls
Poll	Pre- season	Week 2	Week 3	Week 4	Week 5	Week 6	Week 7	Week 8	Week 9	Week 10	Week 11	Week 12	Week 13	Week 14	Week 15	Week 16	Final
AP	RV	RV															
Coaches																	

Legend
	Increase in ranking
	Decrease in ranking
	No change
(RV)	Received votes
(NR)	Not ranked

Coaches did not release a Week 2 poll, and AP does not release a final poll.

== See also ==
- 2020–21 Duke Blue Devils men's basketball team
