= 2020–21 Pittsburgh Panthers women's basketball team =

Intercollegiate basketball season

2020–21 Pittsburgh Panthers women's basketball
- Conference: Atlantic Coast Conference
- Record: 5–14 (3–12 ACC)
- Head coach: Lance White (3rd season)
- Assistant coaches: Terri Mitchell; Josh Petersen; Bridgette Mitchell
- Home arena: Petersen Events Center

2020–21 ACC women's basketball standings
	Conf.				Overall
Team	W		L	PCT	W		L	PCT
No. 8 Louisville	14	–	2	.875	26	–	4	.867
No. 3 NC State†	12	–	2	.857	22	–	3	.880
Georgia Tech	12	–	6	.667	17	–	9	.654
Syracuse	9	–	7	.563	15	–	9	.625
Florida State	9	–	7	.563	10	–	9	.526
Notre Dame	8	–	7	.533	10	–	10	.500
Virginia Tech	8	–	8	.500	15	–	10	.600
North Carolina	8	–	9	.471	13	–	11	.542
Miami (FL)	8	–	10	.444	11	–	11	.500
Wake Forest	8	–	10	.444	12	–	13	.480
Clemson	5	–	12	.294	12	–	14	.462
Pittsburgh	3	–	12	.200	5	–	14	.263
Boston College	2	–	11	.154	7	–	12	.368
Duke	0	–	1	.000	3	–	1	.750
Virginia	0	–	2	.000	0	–	5	.000
† 2021 ACC tournament winner Duke suspended their season on December 25, 2020; Virginia suspended their season on January 14, 2021; As of March 30, 2021; Rankings from AP poll

The 2020–21 Pittsburgh Panthers women's basketball team represented the University of Pittsburgh during the 2020–21 NCAA Division I women's basketball season. The Panthers, led by third-year head coach Lance White, played their home games at the Petersen Events Center as a member of the Atlantic Coast Conference.

The Panthers finished the season 5–14 and 3–12 in ACC play to finish in twelfth place. In the ACC tournament, they lost to Boston College in the first round. They were not invited to the NCAA tournament or the WNIT.

== Previous season ==
The Panthers finished the season 5–26 and 1–17 in ACC play to finish in fifteenth place. As the fifteenth seed in the ACC tournament, they defeated Notre Dame in the first round before losing to Georgia Tech in the second round. The NCAA tournament and WNIT were cancelled due to the COVID-19 outbreak.

== Off-season ==
=== Departures ===
Name	Number	Pos.	Height	Year	Hometown	Reason for departure
Jahsyni Knight	0	G	5'8"	Sophomore	Perth Amboy, NJ	Transferred to Hofstra
Aysia Bugg	2	G	5'7"	Graduate student	Bolingbrook, IL	Graduated
Kyla Nelson	13	G	5'11"	Junior	Worthing, England	Transferred to FIU

=== Incoming transfers ===
Name	Number	Pos.	Height	Year	Hometown	Previous school
Jayla Everett	20	G	5'10"	Junior	St. Louis, MO	New Mexico
Destiny Strother	31	G	5'9"	Sophomore	Flint, MI	Marquette

=== Recruiting class ===
College recruiting
Name	Hometown	School	Height	Weight	Commit date
Tracey Hueston; F	Roanoke, VA	Northside	6 ft 2 in (1.88 m)	N/A	
Tracey Hueston; F	Recruit ratings: ESPN: (95)				
Liatu King; G	Washington, D.C.	Bishop McNamara	6 ft 0 in (1.83 m)	N/A	
Liatu King; G	Recruit ratings: ESPN: (90)				
Taisha Exanor; G	Châteauguay, Quebec	Dawson College	5 ft 11 in (1.80 m)	N/A	
Taisha Exanor; G	Recruit ratings: ESPN: (88)				
Overall recruit ranking:
Note: In many cases, Scout, Rivals, 247Sports, On3, and ESPN may conflict in their listings of height and weight.; In these cases, the average was taken. ESPN grades are on a 100-point scale.; Sources:

== Roster ==
2020–21 Pittsburgh Panthers women's basketball team
Players
Coaches

Pos.	#	Name	Height	Year	Previous school	Hometown
G	0	Sandrine Clesca	5 ft 9 in (1.75 m)	Fr	Winston-Salem Christian School	Laval, Quebec
G	1	Dayshanette Harris	5 ft 7 in (1.7 m)	So	Ursuline	Youngstown, OH
G	2	Liatu King	6 ft 0 in (1.83 m)	Fr	Bishop McNamara	Washington, D.C.
G	3	Taisha Exanor	6 ft 0 in (1.83 m)	Fr	Dawson College	Châteauguay, Quebec
G	4	Emy Hayford	5 ft 8 in (1.73 m)	So	Caland Lyceum	Maastricht, Netherlands
G	5	Amber Brown	6 ft 0 in (1.83 m)	So	Little Rock Christian Academy	Monroe, LA
G	10	Ismini Prapa	5 ft 7 in (1.7 m)	Jr	American Community School of Athens	Athens, Greece
C	11	Cara Judkins	6 ft 2 in (1.88 m)	Sr	Our Lady of Good Counsel	Bethesda, MD
G	12	Gabbie Green	5 ft 7 in (1.7 m)	Sr	Bellville	Bellville, TX
F	13	Tracey Hueston	6 ft 2 in (1.88 m)	Fr	Northside	Roanoke, VA
F	14	Cynthia Ezeja	6 ft 3 in (1.91 m)	RS Fr	20th High School of Athens	Athens, Greece
G	20	Jayla Everett	5 ft 10 in (1.78 m)	Jr	Kirkwood HS; New Mexico	St. Louis, MO
C	21	Marcella LaMark	6 ft 4 in (1.93 m)	Sr	Divino Salvador; Texas Tech	São Paulo, Brazil
F	23	Rita Igbokwe	6 ft 4 in (1.93 m)	So	Mundy's Mill	Jonesboro, GA
G	31	Destiny Strother	5 ft 9 in (1.75 m)	So	Carman-Ainsworth; Marquette	Flint, MI

Head coach

- Lance White (Texas Tech)

Assistant coach(es)

- Terri Mitchell (Duquesne)
- Josh Petersen (Florida State)
- Bridgette Mitchell (Duke)

Legend

- (C) Team captain
- (S) Suspended
- (I) Ineligible
- (W) Walk-on
- Injured
- Current redshirt

Roster
Last update: December 7, 2020

== Schedule ==
Date time, TV	Rank^{#}	Opponent^{#}	Result	Record	Site (attendance) city, state
Non-conference regular season
November 25, 2020*; Noon, ACCNX		George Mason	W 72–57	1–0	Peterson Events Center (500); Pittsburgh, PA
November 29, 2020*; 2:00 p.m., ACCNX		Hofstra	W 71–58	2–0	Peterson Events Center (500); Pittsburgh, PA
December 6, 2020*; 6:00 p.m., ACCNX		Delaware	L 79–85	2–1	Peterson Events Center (500); Pittsburgh, PA
ACC regular season
December 10, 2020; 6:00 p.m., ACCNX		at Virginia Tech	L 71–88	2–2 (0–1)	Cassell Coliseum (250); Blacksburg, VA
December 13, 2020; Noon, ACCN		Clemson	W 80–71	3–2 (1–1)	Peterson Events Center (0); Pittsburgh, PA
December 20, 2020; 2:00 p.m., ACCNX		at Florida State	L 53–67	3–3 (1–2)	Donald L. Tucker Center (1,150); Tallahassee, FL
December 31, 2020; 2:00 p.m., ACCNX		Boston College	Postponed		Peterson Events Center; Pittsburgh, PA
January 3, 2021; 1:00 p.m., RSN		North Carolina	Postponed		Peterson Events Center; Pittsburgh, PA
January 7, 2021; 6:00 p.m., RSN		at No. 2 Louisville	Postponed		KFC Yum! Center; Louisville, KY
January 10, 2021; 2:00 p.m., ACCN		Clemson	Postponed		Peterson Events Center; Pittsburgh, PA
January 14, 2021; 6:00 p.m., ACCNX		at Notre Dame	Postponed		Purcell Pavilion; Notre Dame, IN
January 21, 2021; 6:00 p.m., ACCNX		Miami (FL)	L 68–72	3–4 (1–3)	Peterson Events Center (500); Pittsburgh, PA
January 24, 2021; 1:00 p.m., RSN		at Boston College	Postponed		Conte Forum; Chestnut Hill, MA
January 26, 2021; 7:00 p.m., ACCNX		at Clemson	W 79–69	4–4 (2–3)	Littlejohn Coliseum (307); Clemson, SC
January 28, 2021; 6:00 p.m., ACCNX		at Syracuse	L 57–80	4–5 (2–4)	Carrier Dome (0); Syracuse, NY
January 31, 2021; 2:00 p.m., ACCNX		Virginia	Canceled		Peterson Events Center; Pittsburgh, PA
February 4, 2021; 7:00 p.m., RSN		Virginia Tech	L 55–74	4–6 (2–5)	Peterson Events Center (500); Pittsburgh, PA
February 7, 2021; 2:00 p.m., RSN		Syracuse	L 67–71	4–7 (2–6)	Peterson Events Center (500); Pittsburgh, PA
February 11, 2021; 6:00 p.m., ACCNX		at Wake Forest	L 61–64 ^{OT}	4–8 (2–7)	LJVM Coliseum (0); Winston–Salem, NC
February 14, 2021; 2:00 p.m., ACCNX		North Carolina	L 72–81	4–9 (2–8)	Peterson Events Center (0); Pittsburgh, PA
February 16, 2021; 6:00 p.m., ACCNX		Boston College	W 83–80	5–9 (3–8)	Peterson Events Center (0); Pittsburgh, PA
February 18, 2021; 8:00 p.m., ACCN		No. 3 Louisville	L 58–82	5–10 (3–9)	Peterson Events Center (500); Pittsburgh, PA
February 22, 2021; 8:00 p.m., ACCN		Notre Dame	L 48–59	5–11 (3–10)	Peterson Events Center (500); Pittsburgh, PA
February 25, 2021; 4:00 p.m., RSN		at No. 2 NC State	L 53–83	5–12 (3–11)	Reynolds Coliseum (25); Raleigh, NC
February 28, 2021; 2:00 p.m., ACCN		at Georgia Tech	L 60–65	5–13 (3–12)	McCamish Pavilion (1,200); Atlanta, GA
ACC Women's Tournament
March 3, 2021; 2:00 p.m., RSN	(12)	vs. (13) Boston College; First Round	L 56–67	5–14	Greensboro Coliseum (156); Greensboro, NC
*Non-conference game. ^{#}Rankings from AP Poll. (#) Tournament seedings in parentheses. All times are in Eastern.

== Rankings ==
Regular season polls
Poll	Pre- season	Week 2	Week 3	Week 4	Week 5	Week 6	Week 7	Week 8	Week 9	Week 10	Week 11	Week 12	Week 13	Week 14	Week 15	Week 16	Final
AP																	
Coaches																	

Legend
	Increase in ranking
	Decrease in ranking
	No change
(RV)	Received votes
(NR)	Not ranked

Coaches did not release a Week 2 poll and AP does not release a poll after the NCAA tournament.
