= 2020–21 Boston College Eagles women's basketball team =

Intercollegiate basketball season

2020–21 Boston College Eagles women's basketball
- Conference: Atlantic Coast Conference
- Record: 7–12 (2–11 ACC)
- Head coach: Joanna Bernabei-McNamee (3rd season)
- Assistant coaches: Yolanda Griffith; AJ Cohen; George Porcha
- Home arena: Conte Forum

2020–21 ACC women's basketball standings
	Conf.				Overall
Team	W		L	PCT	W		L	PCT
No. 8 Louisville	14	–	2	.875	26	–	4	.867
No. 3 NC State†	12	–	2	.857	22	–	3	.880
Georgia Tech	12	–	6	.667	17	–	9	.654
Syracuse	9	–	7	.563	15	–	9	.625
Florida State	9	–	7	.563	10	–	9	.526
Notre Dame	8	–	7	.533	10	–	10	.500
Virginia Tech	8	–	8	.500	15	–	10	.600
North Carolina	8	–	9	.471	13	–	11	.542
Miami (FL)	8	–	10	.444	11	–	11	.500
Wake Forest	8	–	10	.444	12	–	13	.480
Clemson	5	–	12	.294	12	–	14	.462
Pittsburgh	3	–	12	.200	5	–	14	.263
Boston College	2	–	11	.154	7	–	12	.368
Duke	0	–	1	.000	3	–	1	.750
Virginia	0	–	2	.000	0	–	5	.000
† 2021 ACC tournament winner Duke suspended their season on December 25, 2020; Virginia suspended their season on January 14, 2021; As of March 30, 2021; Rankings from AP poll

The 2020–21 Boston College Eagles women's basketball team represented Boston College during the 2020–21 NCAA Division I women's basketball season. The Eagles were led by third year head coach Joanna Bernabei-McNamee. They played their home games at the Conte Forum and are members of the Atlantic Coast Conference.

The Eagles finished the season 7–12 and 2–11 in ACC play to finish in a thirteenth place. In the ACC tournament, they defeated Pittsburgh in the First Round before losing to Syracuse in the Second Round. They were not invited to the NCAA tournament or the WNIT.

== Previous season ==
The Eagles finished the season 20–12 and 11–7 in ACC play to finish in a tie for fourth place. As the sixth seed in the ACC tournament, they defeated Clemson in the Second Round and Duke in the Quarterfinals before losing to eventual champion NC State in Semifinals. The NCAA tournament and WNIT were cancelled due to the COVID-19 outbreak.

== Off-season ==
=== Departures ===
Name	Number	Pos.	Height	Year	Hometown	Reason for departure
Taylor Ortlepp	4	G	5'10"	Senior	Adelaide, Australia	Graduated
Georgia Pineau	5	F	6'1"	Senior	Victoria, Australia	Graduated
Emma Guy	11	F	6'3"	Senior	Penfield, NY	Graduated
Milan Bolden-Morris	23	G	5'10"	Junior	Belle Glade, FL	Transferred to Georgetown
Sydney Lowery	31	G	5'10"	Junior	Shelton, CT	Opted out of season, and will transfer

=== Recruiting class ===
College recruiting information
Name	Hometown	School	Height	Weight	Commit date
Josiah Lacey; G	Douglassville, PA	Westtown School	6 ft 0 in (1.83 m)	N/A	
Josiah Lacey; G	Recruit ratings: ESPN: (96)				
Kaylah Ivey; PG	Forestville, MD	Riverdale Baptist School	5 ft 8 in (1.73 m)	N/A	
Kaylah Ivey; PG	Recruit ratings: ESPN: (90)				
Sydney McQuietor; F	Keller, TX	Keller High School	6 ft 0 in (1.83 m)	N/A	
Sydney McQuietor; F	Recruit ratings: ESPN: (90)				
Overall recruit ranking:
Note: In many cases, Scout, Rivals, 247Sports, On3, and ESPN may conflict in their listings of height and weight.; In these cases, the average was taken. ESPN grades are on a 100-point scale.; Sources:

== Roster ==
2020–21 Boston College Eagles women's basketball team
Players
Coaches

Pos.	#	Name	Height	Year	Previous school	Hometown
G	1	Cameron Swartz	5 ft 11 in (1.8 m)	Jr	Fellowship Christian School	Marietta, GA
G	2	Kaylah Ivey	5 ft 8 in (1.73 m)	Fr	Riverdale Baptist School	Forestville, MD
G/F	3	Jaelyn Batts	6 ft 0 in (1.83 m)	So	Freedom	South Riding, VA
G/F	4	JoJo Lacey	6 ft 1 in (1.85 m)	Fr	Westtown School	Douglassville, PA
G	10	Makayla Dickens	5 ft 8 in (1.73 m)	Jr	Princess Anne	Virginia Beach, VA
F	13	Taylor Soule	5 ft 11 in (1.8 m)	Jr	Kimball Union Academy	Lebanon, NH
G	14	Marnelle Garraud	5 ft 7 in (1.7 m)	Jr	Noble and Greenough School	Lynn, MA
F	21	Sydney McQuietor	6 ft 2 in (1.88 m)	Fr	Keller	Keller, TX
C	32	Clara Ford	6 ft 3 in (1.91 m)	Jr	George C. Marshall	Vienna, VA
C	44	Akunna Konkwo	6 ft 2 in (1.88 m)	RS Fr	Bishop Ireton	Alexandria, VA

Head coach

- Joanna Bernabei-McNamee (West Liberty)

Assistant coach(es)

- Yolanda Griffith (Florida Atlantic)
- AJ Cohen (Louisville)
- George Porcha (New Haven)

Legend

- (C) Team captain
- (S) Suspended
- (I) Ineligible
- (W) Walk-on
- Injured
- Current redshirt

Roster
Last update: November 30, 2020

== Schedule ==
Date time, TV	Rank^{#}	Opponent^{#}	Result	Record	Site (attendance) city, state
Non Conference Regular season
November 25, 2020*; Noon, ACCNX		New Hampshire	W 80–44	1–0	Conte Forum (0); Chestnut Hill, MA
November 29, 2020*; 2:00 p.m., ACCNX		UMass	W 90–82	2–0	Conte Forum (0); Chestnut Hill, MA
December 2, 2020*; 5:00 p.m., ACCNX		Providence	W 58–46	3–0	Conte Forum (0); Chestnut Hill, MA
December 6, 2020*; 2:00 p.m., ACCNX		UMass Lowell	W 88–38	4–0	Conte Forum (0); Chestnut Hill, MA
ACC Regular season
December 9, 2020; 11:00 a.m., ACCNX		at Georgia Tech	L 68–86	4–1 (0–1)	McCamish Pavilion (1,200); Atlanta, GA
December 13, 2020; 2:00 p.m., ACCN		No. 4 NC State	L 69–75	4–2 (0–2)	Conte Forum (0); Chestnut Hill, MA
December 20, 2020; 2:00 p.m., ACCN		No. 18 Syracuse	L 70–83	4–3 (0–3)	Conte Forum (0); Chestnut Hill, MA
December 31, 2020; 2:00 p.m., ACCNX		at Pittsburgh	Postponed		Peterson Events Center; Pittsburgh, PA
January 3, 2021; 2:00 p.m., ACCN		No. 3 NC State	L 57–76	4–4 (0–4)	Reynolds Coliseum (0); Raleigh, NC
January 7, 2021; 8:00 p.m., ACCN		Notre Dame	W 64–61	5–4 (1–4)	Conte Forum (0); Chestnut Hill, MA
January 10, 2021; 4:00 p.m., ACCN		at Wake Forest	L 48–68	5–5 (1–5)	LJVM Coliseum (0); Winston–Salem, NC
January 14, 2021; 8:00 p.m., ACCN		at No. 2 Louisville	L 70–89	5–6 (1–6)	KFC Yum! Center (2,604); Louisville, KY
January 17, 2021; Noon, ACCN		at Notre Dame	L 73–83	5–7 (1–7)	Purcell Pavilion (110); Notre Dame, IN
January 21, 2021; 7:00 p.m., ACCNX		Clemson	Postponed		Conte Forum; Chestnut Hill, MA
January 24, 2021; 1:00 p.m., NESN		Pittsburgh	Postponed		Conte Forum; Chestnut Hill, MA
January 28, 2021; 7:00 p.m., ACCNX		Florida State	Postponed		Conte Forum; Chestnut Hill, MA
January 31, 2021; 1:00 p.m., NESN		at Miami (FL)	Postponed		Watsco Center; Coral Gables, FL
February 4, 2021; 8:00 p.m., ACCN		No. 1 Louisville	L 68–97	5–8 (1–8)	Conte Forum (0); Chestnut Hill, MA
February 7, 2021; 4:00 p.m., ACCN		at Virginia	Canceled		John Paul Jones Arena; Charlottesville, VA
February 7, 2021; 2:00 p.m., ACCNX		Clemson	Postponed		Littlejohn Coliseum; Clemson, SC
February 11, 2021; 6:00 p.m., ACCNX		at North Carolina	Postponed		Carmichael Arena; Chapel Hill, NC
February 14, 2021; 2:00 p.m., ACCNX		Virginia Tech	Postponed		Conte Forum; Chestnut Hill, MA
February 16, 2021; 6:00 p.m., ACCNX		at Pittsburgh	L 80–83	5–9 (1–9)	Peterson Events Center (0); Pittsburgh, PA
February 18, 2021; 8:00 p.m., ACCNX		at Miami (FL)	L 60–77	5–10 (1–10)	Watsco Center (0); Coral Gables, FL
February 21, 2021; 2:00 p.m., NESN		Georgia Tech	W 49–43	6–10 (2–10)	Conte Forum (0); Chestnut Hill, MA
February 25, 2021; 8:00 p.m., ACCN		at Syracuse	L 75–92	6–11 (2–11)	Carrier Dome (0); Syracuse, NY
ACC Women's Tournament
March 3, 2021; 2:00 p.m., NESN	(13)	vs. (12) Pittsburgh; First Round	W 67–56	7–11	Greensboro Coliseum (156); Greensboro, NC
March 4, 2021; 2:30 p.m., NESN+	(13)	vs. (5) Syracuse; Second Round	L 61–67	7–12	Greensboro Coliseum (609); Greensboro, NC
*Non-conference game. ^{#}Rankings from AP Poll. (#) Tournament seedings in parentheses. All times are in Eastern.

== Rankings ==
Regular season polls
Poll	Pre- Season	Week 2	Week 3	Week 4	Week 5	Week 6	Week 7	Week 8	Week 9	Week 10	Week 11	Week 12	Week 13	Week 14	Week 15	Week 16	Final
AP	RV	RV	RV	RV													
Coaches																	

Legend
	Increase in ranking
	Decrease in ranking
	No change
(RV)	Received votes
(NR)	Not ranked

Coaches did not release a Week 2 poll and AP does not release a poll after the NCAA Tournament.

== See also ==
- 2020–21 Boston College Eagles men's basketball team
