= 2020–21 Notre Dame Fighting Irish women's basketball team =

Intercollegiate basketball season

2020–21 Notre Dame Fighting Irish women's basketball
- Conference: Atlantic Coast Conference
- Record: 10–10 (8–7 ACC)
- Head coach: Niele Ivey (1st season)
- Associate head coach: Carol Owens (21st season)
- Assistant coaches: Coquese Washington (1st season); Michaela Mabrey (2nd season)
- Home arena: Purcell Pavilion

2020–21 ACC women's basketball standings
	Conf.				Overall
Team	W		L	PCT	W		L	PCT
No. 8 Louisville	14	–	2	.875	26	–	4	.867
No. 3 NC State†	12	–	2	.857	22	–	3	.880
Georgia Tech	12	–	6	.667	17	–	9	.654
Syracuse	9	–	7	.563	15	–	9	.625
Florida State	9	–	7	.563	10	–	9	.526
Notre Dame	8	–	7	.533	10	–	10	.500
Virginia Tech	8	–	8	.500	15	–	10	.600
North Carolina	8	–	9	.471	13	–	11	.542
Miami (FL)	8	–	10	.444	11	–	11	.500
Wake Forest	8	–	10	.444	12	–	13	.480
Clemson	5	–	12	.294	12	–	14	.462
Pittsburgh	3	–	12	.200	5	–	14	.263
Boston College	2	–	11	.154	7	–	12	.368
Duke	0	–	1	.000	3	–	1	.750
Virginia	0	–	2	.000	0	–	5	.000
† 2021 ACC tournament winner Duke suspended their season on December 25, 2020; Virginia suspended their season on January 14, 2021; As of March 30, 2021; Rankings from AP poll

The 2020–21 Notre Dame Fighting Irish women's basketball team represented the University of Notre Dame during the 2020–21 NCAA Division I women's basketball season. The Fighting Irish were led by first year head coach Niele Ivey and played their home games at Purcell Pavilion as members of the Atlantic Coast Conference.

The Fighting Irish finished the season 10–10 and 8–7 in ACC play to finish in sixth place. In the ACC tournament, they lost to Clemson in the Second Round. They were not invited to the NCAA tournament or the WNIT.

== Previous season ==
The Fighting Irish finished the 2019–20 season at 13–18 and 8–10 in ACC play to finish in a tie for ninth place. As the tenth seed in the ACC tournament, they lost to Pittsburgh in the First Round. The NCAA tournament and WNIT were cancelled due to the COVID-19 outbreak.

== Offseason ==
=== Departures ===
Name	Number	Pos.	Height	Year	Hometown	Reason for departure
Kristin Baer	1	F	6'2"	Graduate Student	San Jose, CA	Graduated
Kaitlin Cole	2	G	5'10"	Senior	Toledo, OH	Graduated
Margaret Murdock	3	G	5'8"	Sophomore	Glencoe, IL	—
Catherine Murdock	5	G	5'8"	Sophomore	Glencoe, IL	—
Marta Sniezek	13	G	5'8"	Graduate Student	McLean, VA	Graduated
Kathleen Keyes	40	F	5'11"	Freshman	Ridgewood, NJ	—

=== Incoming transfers ===
Name	Number	Pos.	Height	Year	Hometown	Previous school
Dara Mabrey	1	G	5'7"	Junior	Belmar, NJ	Virginia Tech

=== 2020 recruiting class ===
College recruiting
Name	Hometown	School	Height	Weight	Commit date
Maddy Westbeld; F	Kettering, OH	Fairmont	6 ft 2 in (1.88 m)	N/A	
Maddy Westbeld; F	Recruit ratings: ESPN: (98)				
Allison Campbell; PG	Altoona, PA	Bellwood-Antis	5 ft 11 in (1.80 m)	N/A	
Allison Campbell; PG	Recruit ratings: ESPN: (97)				
Natalija Marshall; F	Queens, NY	Christ the King	6 ft 5 in (1.96 m)	N/A	
Natalija Marshall; F	Recruit ratings: ESPN: (97)				
Alasia Hayes; PG	Murfreesboro, TN	Riverdale	5 ft 7 in (1.70 m)	N/A	
Alasia Hayes; PG	Recruit ratings: ESPN: (96)				
Amirah Abdur-Rahim; F	Marietta, GA	St. Francis	6 ft 2 in (1.88 m)	N/A	
Amirah Abdur-Rahim; F	Recruit ratings: ESPN: (89)				
Overall recruit ranking:
Note: In many cases, Scout, Rivals, 247Sports, On3, and ESPN may conflict in their listings of height and weight.; In these cases, the average was taken. ESPN grades are on a 100-point scale.; Sources:

== Roster ==
2020–21 Notre Dame Fighting Irish women's basketball team
Players
Coaches

Pos.	#	Name	Height	Year	Previous school	Hometown
G	1	Dara Mabrey	5 ft 7 in (1.7 m)	Jr	Manasquan; Virginia Tech	Belmar, NJ
F	3	Amirah Abdur-Rahim	6 ft 3 in (1.91 m)	Fr	St. Francis	Marietta, GA
G	5	Alasia Hayes	5 ft 7 in (1.7 m)	Fr	Riverdale	Murfreesboro, TN
G	10	Katlyn Gilbert	5 ft 10 in (1.78 m)	Jr	Heritage Christian	Indianapolis, IN
G	12	Abby Prohaska	5 ft 10 in (1.78 m)	Jr	Lakota West	Liberty Township, OH
F	15	Natalija Marshall	6 ft 5 in (1.96 m)	Fr	Christ the King	Queens, NY
G	20	Nicole Benz	5 ft 8 in (1.73 m)	Sr	William S. Hart	Santa Clarita, CA
G	21	Anaya Peoples	5 ft 10 in (1.78 m)	So	Schlarman Academy	Danville, IL
F	22	Danielle Cosgrove	6 ft 4 in (1.93 m)	Jr	Sachem East	Holbrook, NY
G	23	Alli Campbell	6 ft 0 in (1.83 m)	Fr	Bellwood-Antis	Altoona, PA
G	24	Destinee Walker	5 ft 10 in (1.78 m)	GS	Lake Highland Prep; North Carolina	Orlando, FL
G	25	Olivia Miles	5 ft 10 in (1.78 m)	Fr	Blair Academy	Phillipsburg, NJ
C	30	Mikayla Vaughn	6 ft 3 in (1.91 m)	Sr	Paul VI Catholic	Philadelphia, PA
F	33	Sam Brunelle	6 ft 2 in (1.88 m)	So	William Monroe High School	Ruckersville, VA
F	34	Maddy Westbeld	6 ft 3 in (1.91 m)	Fr	Fairmont	Kettering, OH

Head coach

- Niele Ivey (Notre Dame)

Assistant coach(es)

- Carol Owens (Northern Illinois)
- Coquese Washington (Notre Dame)
- Michaela Mabrey (Notre Dame)

Legend

- (C) Team captain
- (S) Suspended
- (I) Ineligible
- (W) Walk-on
- Injured
- Current redshirt

Roster
Last update: February 2021

== Schedule and results ==
Date time, TV	Rank^{#}	Opponent^{#}	Result	Record	Site (attendance) city, state
Non-conference Regular season
November 27, 2020*; Noon, ESPN+	No. 22	at Ohio	L 85–86	0–1	Convocation Center (0); Athens, OH
November 29, 2020*; 4:00 p.m., ACCN	No. 22	Miami (OH)	W 88–68	1–1	Purcell Pavilion (79); Notre Dame, IN
December 3, 2020*; 6:00 p.m., ACCN		No. 24 Michigan; ACC–Big Ten Women's Challenge	L 66–76	1–2	Purcell Pavilion (122); Notre Dame, IN
December 6, 2020*; 2:00 p.m., ACCNX		IUPUI	W 65–58	2–2	Purcell Pavilion (523); Notre Dame, IN
ACC Regular season
December 13, 2020; 2:00 p.m., ACCNX		Georgia Tech	L 67–82	2–3 (0–1)	Purcell Pavilion (93); Notre Dame, IN
December 17, 2020; 6:00 p.m., ACCN		Virginia Tech	W 84–78	3–3 (1–1)	Purcell Pavilion (64); Notre Dame, IN
December 20, 2020; 3:00 p.m., RSN		at Clemson	L 55–78	3–4 (1–2)	Littlejohn Coliseum (425); Clemson, SC
December 31, 2020; 3:00 p.m., ACCN		at Miami (FL)	W 71–60	4–4 (2–2)	Watsco Center (0); Coral Gables, FL
January 3, 2021; 4:00 p.m., ACCN		Georgia Tech	W 69–67	5–4 (3–2)	Purcell Pavilion (53); Notre Dame, IN
January 7, 2021; 8:00 p.m., ACCN		at Boston College	L 61–64	5–5 (3–3)	Conte Forum (0); Chestnut Hill, MA
January 10, 2021; 2:00 p.m., ESPNU		at No. 24 Syracuse	Postponed due to COVID-19		Carrier Dome; Syracuse, NY
January 14, 2021; 6:00 p.m., ACCNX		Pittsburgh	Postponed due to COVID-19		Purcell Pavilion; Notre Dame, IN
January 14, 2021; 4:00 p.m., ACCN		Wake Forest	W 79–72	6–5 (4–3)	Purcell Pavilion (50); Notre Dame, IN
January 17, 2021; Noon, ACCN		Boston College	W 83–73	7–5 (5–3)	Purcell Pavilion (110); Notre Dame, IN
January 21, 2021; 7:00 p.m., RSN		at Virginia Tech	W 65–60	8–5 (6–3)	Cassell Coliseum (250); Blacksburg, VA
January 24, 2021; Noon, ESPNU		at North Carolina	L 73–78	8–6 (6–4)	Carmichael Arena (0); Chapel Hill, NC
January 31, 2021; 4:00 p.m., ACCN		Duke	Canceled due to Duke suspending season		Purcell Pavilion; Notre Dame, IN
January 31, 2021; 11:00 a.m., ACCN		at Syracuse	L 69–81	8–7 (6–5)	Carrier Dome (0); Syracuse, NY
February 7, 2021; 2:00 p.m., ESPN		at No. 1 Louisville	L 65–71	8–8 (6–6)	KFC Yum! Center (2,912); Louisville, KY
February 11, 2021; 7:00 p.m., RSN		Virginia	Canceled due to Virginia suspending season		Purcell Pavilion; Notre Dame, IN
February 15, 2021; 5:00 p.m., ESPN2		at No. 4 NC State	Postponed due to COVID-19		Reynolds Coliseum; Raleigh, NC
February 18, 2021; 8:00 p.m., ACCN		Syracuse	Postponed due to COVID-19		Purcell Pavilion; Notre Dame, IN
February 22, 2021; 8:00 p.m., ACCN		at Pittsburgh	W 59–48	9–8 (7–6)	Peterson Events Center (500); Pittsburgh, PA
February 25, 2021; 7:00 p.m., ACCNX		Florida State	W 72–64	10–8 (8–6)	Purcell Pavilion (114); Notre Dame, IN
February 28, 2021; 3:00 p.m., ESPN		No. 6 Louisville	L 61–78	10–9 (8–7)	Purcell Pavilion (126); Notre Dame, IN
ACC Women's Tournament
March 4, 2021; 8:30 p.m., RSN	(6)	vs. (11) Clemson; Second Round	L 63–68	10–10	Greensboro, NC (451); Greensboro Coliseum
*Non-conference game. ^{#}Rankings from AP Poll. (#) Tournament seedings in parentheses. All times are in Eastern.

== Rankings ==
2020–21 NCAA Division I women's basketball rankings

Regular season polls
Poll	Pre- Season	Week 2	Week 3	Week 4	Week 5	Week 6	Week 7	Week 8	Week 9	Week 10	Week 11	Week 12	Week 13	Week 14	Week 15	Week 16	Final
AP	22	RV	RV														
Coaches	23	RV															

Legend
	Increase in ranking
	Decrease in ranking
	No change
(RV)	Received votes
(NR)	Not ranked
