= 2020–21 Virginia Tech Hokies women's basketball team =

Intercollegiate basketball season

2020–21 Virginia Tech Hokies women's basketball

NCAA Tournament, Second Round
- Conference: Atlantic Coast Conference

Ranking
- Coaches: No. RV
- AP: No. RV
- Record: 15–10 (8–8 ACC)
- Head coach: Kenny Brooks (5th season)
- Assistant coaches: Shawn Poppie; Christal Caldwell; Lindsey Hicks
- Home arena: Cassell Coliseum

2020–21 ACC women's basketball standings
	Conf.				Overall
Team	W		L	PCT	W		L	PCT
No. 8 Louisville	14	–	2	.875	26	–	4	.867
No. 3 NC State†	12	–	2	.857	22	–	3	.880
Georgia Tech	12	–	6	.667	17	–	9	.654
Syracuse	9	–	7	.563	15	–	9	.625
Florida State	9	–	7	.563	10	–	9	.526
Notre Dame	8	–	7	.533	10	–	10	.500
Virginia Tech	8	–	8	.500	15	–	10	.600
North Carolina	8	–	9	.471	13	–	11	.542
Miami (FL)	8	–	10	.444	11	–	11	.500
Wake Forest	8	–	10	.444	12	–	13	.480
Clemson	5	–	12	.294	12	–	14	.462
Pittsburgh	3	–	12	.200	5	–	14	.263
Boston College	2	–	11	.154	7	–	12	.368
Duke	0	–	1	.000	3	–	1	.750
Virginia	0	–	2	.000	0	–	5	.000
† 2021 ACC tournament winner Duke suspended their season on December 25, 2020; Virginia suspended their season on January 14, 2021; As of March 30, 2021; Rankings from AP poll

The 2020–21 Virginia Tech Hokies women's basketball team represented Virginia Polytechnic Institute and State University during the 2020–21 NCAA Division I women's basketball season. The Hokies, led by fifth year head coach Kenny Brooks, played their home games at Cassell Coliseum as members of the Atlantic Coast Conference.

The Hokies finished the season 15–10 and 8–8 in ACC play to finish in seventh place. In the ACC tournament, they defeated Miami in the Second Round before losing to eventual champions NC State in the Quarterfinals. They received an at-large bid to the NCAA tournament where they were the seven seed in the Riverwalk Regional. In the tournament they defeated ten seed Marquette in the First Round before losing to two seed Baylor in the Second Round to end their season.

== Previous season ==
They finished the 2019–20 season 21–9 and 11–7 in ACC play to finish in a tie for fourth place. As the fifth seed in the ACC tournament, they lost to Wake Forest in the Second Round. The NCAA tournament and WNIT were cancelled due to the COVID-19 outbreak.

== Off-season ==
=== Departures ===
Name	Number	Pos.	Height	Year	Hometown	Reason for departure
Trinity Baptiste	0	F	6'0"	Junior	Tampa, FL	Transferred to Arizona
Dara Mabrey	4	G	5'7"	Sophomore	Belmar, NJ	Transferred to Notre Dame
Taja Cole	5	G	5'8"	Graduate Student	Richmond, VA	Graduated
Kendyl Brooks	10	G	5'10"	Senior	Harrisonburg, VA	Graduated
Lydia Rivers	21	F	6'2"	Graduate Student	Kinston, NC	Graduated

=== Incoming transfers ===
Name	Number	Pos.	Height	Year	Hometown	Previous school
D'Asia Gregg	11	F	6'2"	Junior	Florence, SC	Georgia Tech/Gulf Coast State
Azana Baines	15	G	6'1"	Sophomore	Blackwood, NJ	Duke

=== Recruiting class ===
College recruiting
Name	Hometown	School	Height	Weight	Commit date
Shamarla King; G	Hartford, CT	Watkinson School	6 ft 0 in (1.83 m)	N/A	
Shamarla King; G	Recruit ratings: ESPN: (94)				
Shelby Calhoun; G	Louisville, KY	Christian Academy of Louisville	5 ft 11 in (1.80 m)	N/A	
Shelby Calhoun; G	Recruit ratings: ESPN: (90)				
Nevaeh Dean; F	Hamilton, OH	Lakota West	6 ft 1 in (1.85 m)	N/A	
Nevaeh Dean; F	Recruit ratings: ESPN: (90)				
Overall recruit ranking:
Note: In many cases, Scout, Rivals, 247Sports, On3, and ESPN may conflict in their listings of height and weight.; In these cases, the average was taken. ESPN grades are on a 100-point scale.; Sources:

== Roster ==
2020–21 Virginia Tech Hokies women's basketball team
Players
Coaches

Pos.	#	Name	Height	Year	Previous school	Hometown
G/F	0	Makayla Ennis	6 ft 0 in (1.83 m)	So	The RISE Centre Academy	Ontario, Canada
G	2	Aisha Sheppard	5 ft 9 in (1.75 m)	Sr	St. John's	Alexandria, VA
G	3	Chloe Brooks	5 ft 10 in (1.78 m)	RS So	Spotswood	Harrisonburg, VA
G	5	Georgia Amoore	5 ft 5 in (1.65 m)	Fr	Loretto College	Ballarat, Australia
G	10	Da'ja Green	5 ft 6 in (1.68 m)	RS Sr	Morrow; Wofford	Ellenwood, GA
F	11	D'asia Gregg	6 ft 2 in (1.88 m)	Jr	Wilson; Georgia Tech/Gulf Coast State	Florence, SC
G	12	Shelby Calhoun	5 ft 11 in (1.8 m)	Fr	Christian Academy of Louisville	Louisville, KY
G	15	Azana Baines	6 ft 1 in (1.85 m)	So	Gloucester Catholic; Duke	Blackwood, NJ
G	21	Shamarla King	6 ft 0 in (1.83 m)	Fr	Watkinson	Hartford, CT
G	22	Cayla King	5 ft 11 in (1.8 m)	So	Northwest Guilford	Greensboro, NC
F	23	Asiah Jones	6 ft 3 in (1.91 m)	RS Sr	Woodmond; USC	Sacramento, CA
F	31	Nevaeh Dean	6 ft 2 in (1.88 m)	Fr	Lakota West	Hamilton, OH
C	33	Elizabeth Kitley	6 ft 5 in (1.96 m)	So	Northwest Guilford	Summerfield, NC
G/F	35	Taylor Geiman	6 ft 0 in (1.83 m)	So	South Western	Hanover, PA
C	40	Alex Obouh Fegue	6 ft 4 in (1.93 m)	RS Sr	Pierre de Coubertin (Calais, France); Eastern Florida	Chatearoux, France

Head coach

- Kenny Brooks (James Madison)

Assistant coach(es)

- Shawn Poppie (Limestone)
- Christal Caldwell (West Virginia)
- Lindsey Hicks (Purdue)

Legend

- (C) Team captain
- (S) Suspended
- (I) Ineligible
- (W) Walk-on
- Injured
- Current redshirt

Roster
Last update: December 8, 2020

== Schedule ==
Date time, TV	Rank^{#}	Opponent^{#}	Result	Record	Site (attendance) city, state
Non-conference regular season
November 25, 2020*; 4:00 p.m., ACCNX		Richmond	W 85–64	1–0	Cassell Coliseum (250); Blacksburg, VA
November 28, 2020*; 2:00 p.m., ACCNX		Liberty	W 81–66	2–0	Cassell Coliseum (250); Blacksburg, VA
December 1, 2020*; 5:00 p.m., ACCNX		George Washington	W 92–57	3–0	Cassell Coliseum (250); Blacksburg, VA
December 4, 2020*; 5:00 p.m., ACCN		Appalachian State	W 84–59	4–0	Cassell Coliseum (250); Blacksburg, VA
December 6, 2020*; 2:00 p.m., ACCNX		Gardner–Webb	W 73–39	5–0	Cassell Coliseum (250); Blacksburg, VA
ACC regular season
December 10, 2020; 6:00 p.m., ACCNX		Pittsburgh	W 88–71	6–0 (1–0)	Cassell Coliseum (250); Blacksburg, VA
December 17, 2020; 6:00 p.m., ACCN		at Notre Dame	L 78–84	6–1 (1–1)	Purcell Pavilion (64); Notre Dame, IN
December 20, 2021; Noon, ACCN		Virginia	Postponed		Cassell Coliseum; Blacksburg, VA
December 31, 2020; Noon, ACCNX		Florida State	L 63–73	6–2 (1–2)	Cassell Coliseum (250); Blacksburg, VA
January 3, 2021; 2:00 p.m., ACCNX		at Duke	Canceled		Cameron Indoor Stadium; Durham, NC
January 7, 2021; 8:00 p.m., RSN		No. 2 Louisville	L 67–71	6–3 (1–3)	Cassell Coliseum (250); Blacksburg, VA
January 10, 2021; 2:00 p.m., ACCNX		at Georgia Tech	L 54–56	6–4 (1–4)	McCamish Pavilion (1,200); Atlanta, GA
January 14, 2021; 6:00 p.m., ACCNX		at North Carolina	W 66–54	7–4 (2–4)	Carmichael Arena (0); Chapel Hill, NC
January 17, 2021; 4:00 p.m., ACCN		Wake Forest	L 64–67	7–5 (2–5)	Cassell Coliseum (250); Blacksburg, VA
January 21, 2021; 7:00 p.m., RSN		Notre Dame	L 60–65	7–6 (2–6)	Cassell Coliseum (250); Blacksburg, VA
January 24, 2021; 4:00 p.m., ACCNX		at No. 2 NC State	L 87–89	7–7 (2–7)	Reynolds Coliseum (25); Raleigh, NC
January 28, 2021; 4:00 p.m., RSN		No. 2 NC State	W 83–71 ^{OT}	8–7 (3–7)	Cassell Coliseum (250); Blacksburg, VA
January 31, 2021; 2:00 p.m., ACCNX		North Carolina	W 73–69	9–7 (4–7)	Cassell Coliseum (250); Blacksburg, VA
February 2, 2021; 6:00 p.m.		Virginia	Virginia's Season Canceled		Cassell Coliseum; Blacksburg, VA
February 4, 2021; 7:00 p.m., RSN		at Pittsburgh	W 74–55	10–7 (5–7)	Peterson Events Center (500); Pittsburgh, PA
February 11, 2021; 6:00 p.m., ACCN		at Miami (FL)	W 75–55	11–7 (6–7)	Watsco Center (0); Coral Gables, FL
February 14, 2021; 2:00 p.m., ACCNX		at Boston College	Postponed		Conte Forum; Chestnut Hill, MA
February 18, 2021; 6:00 p.m., ACCNX		Duke	Duke's Season Canceled		Cassell Coliseum; Blacksburg, VA
February 21, 2021; Noon, RSN		Syracuse	W 76-68	12–7 (7–7)	Cassell Coliseum (250); Blacksburg, VA
February 25, 2021; 6:00 p.m., ACCN		at Clemson	W 70–64	13–7 (8–7)	Littlejohn Coliseum (327); Clemson, SC
February 28, 2021; 1:00 p.m., ACCNX		at Virginia	Virginia's Season Canceled		John Paul Jones Arena; Charlottesville, VA
February 28, 2021; 2:00 p.m., ACCNX		North Carolina	L 63–68	13–8 (8–8)	Cassell Coliseum (250); Blacksburg, VA
ACC Women's Tournament
March 4, 2021; 6:00 p.m., RSN	(7)	vs. (10) Miami (FL); Second Round	W 72–64	14–8	Greensboro Coliseum (451); Greensboro, NC
March 5, 2021; 6:00 p.m., RSN	(7)	vs. (2) No. 3 NC State; Quarterfinals	L 55–68	14–9	Greensboro Coliseum (592); Greensboro, NC
NCAA tournament
March 21, 2021; Noon, ESPNU	(7 R)	vs. (10 R) Marquette; First Round	W 70–63	15–9	Strahan Arena; San Marcos, TX
March 23, 2021; 7:00 p.m., ESPN2	(7 R)	vs. (2 R) No. 5 Baylor; Second Round	L 48–90	15–10	Alamodome; San Antonio, TX
*Non-conference game. ^{#}Rankings from AP Poll. (#) Tournament seedings in parentheses. R=Riverwalk. All times are in Eastern.

== Rankings ==
2020–21 NCAA Division I women's basketball rankings

Regular season polls
Poll	Pre- Season	Week 2	Week 3	Week 4	Week 5	Week 6	Week 7	Week 8	Week 9	Week 10	Week 11	Week 12	Week 13	Week 14	Week 15	Week 16	Final
AP			RV	RV							RV	RV	RV	RV	RV	RV	RV
Coaches	RV	RV	25т	RV	RV			RV									RV

Legend
	Increase in ranking
	Decrease in ranking
	Not Ranked in Previous Week
(RV)	Received Votes
(NR)	Not Ranked

== See also ==
- 2020–21 Virginia Tech Hokies men's basketball team
