= 2020–21 Miami Hurricanes women's basketball team =

Intercollegiate basketball season

2020–21 Miami Hurricanes women's basketball
- Conference: Atlantic Coast Conference
- Record: 11–11 (8–10 ACC)
- Head coach: Katie Meier (16th season)
- Assistant coaches: Octavia Blue; Fitzroy Anthony; Kelly Gibson
- Home arena: Watsco Center

2020–21 ACC women's basketball standings
	Conf.				Overall
Team	W		L	PCT	W		L	PCT
No. 8 Louisville	14	–	2	.875	26	–	4	.867
No. 3 NC State†	12	–	2	.857	22	–	3	.880
Georgia Tech	12	–	6	.667	17	–	9	.654
Syracuse	9	–	7	.563	15	–	9	.625
Florida State	9	–	7	.563	10	–	9	.526
Notre Dame	8	–	7	.533	10	–	10	.500
Virginia Tech	8	–	8	.500	15	–	10	.600
North Carolina	8	–	9	.471	13	–	11	.542
Miami (FL)	8	–	10	.444	11	–	11	.500
Wake Forest	8	–	10	.444	12	–	13	.480
Clemson	5	–	12	.294	12	–	14	.462
Pittsburgh	3	–	12	.200	5	–	14	.263
Boston College	2	–	11	.154	7	–	12	.368
Duke	0	–	1	.000	3	–	1	.750
Virginia	0	–	2	.000	0	–	5	.000
† 2021 ACC tournament winner Duke suspended their season on December 25, 2020; Virginia suspended their season on January 14, 2021; As of March 30, 2021; Rankings from AP poll

The 2020–21 Miami Hurricanes women's basketball team represented the University of Miami during the 2020–21 NCAA Division I women's basketball season. The Hurricanes were led by sixteenth-year head coach Katie Meier and played their home games at the Watsco Center as members of the Atlantic Coast Conference.

The Hurricanes finished the season 11–11 and 8–10 in ACC play to finish in a tie for ninth place. As the tenth seed in the ACC tournament, they lost to Virginia Tech in the Second Round. They were not invited to the NCAA tournament or the WNIT.

== Previous season ==
For the 2019–20 season, the Hurricanes finished 15–15 and 7–11 in ACC play to finish in a tie for eleventh place. As the eleventh seed in the ACC tournament, they lost to Clemson in the First Round. The NCAA tournament and WNIT were cancelled due to the COVID-19 outbreak.

== Off-season ==
=== Departures ===
Name	Number	Pos.	Height	Year	Hometown	Reason for departure
Iggy Allen	12	G	5'10"	(redshirt) Junior	Pompano Beach, FL	Transferred to FAU
Yasmeen Chang	22	G	5'9"	Freshman	Naples, FL	Transferred to Florida
Beatrice Mompremier	32	F	6'4"	(redshirt) Senior	Miami, FL	Graduated

=== Incoming transfers ===
Name	Number	Pos.	Height	Year	Hometown	Previous school
Karla Erjavec	25	G	5'10"	Junior	Zagreb, Croatia	Wyoming
Naomi Mbandu	35	F	6'2"	Junior	Tarbes, France	Gulf Coast State

=== Recruiting class ===
College recruiting
Name	Hometown	School	Height	Weight	Commit date
Nyayongah Gony; F	Lincoln, NE	Lincoln	6 ft 3 in (1.91 m)	N/A	
Nyayongah Gony; F	Recruit ratings: ESPN: (95)				
Overall recruit ranking:
Note: In many cases, Scout, Rivals, 247Sports, On3, and ESPN may conflict in their listings of height and weight.; In these cases, the average was taken. ESPN grades are on a 100-point scale.; Sources:

== Roster ==
2020–21 Miami Hurricanes women's basketball team
Players
Coaches

Pos.	#	Name	Height	Year	Previous school	Hometown
G	0	Kenza Salgues	5 ft 9 in (1.75 m)	So	INSEP	Montpellier, FR
G/F	1	Moulayna Johnson Sidi Baba	6 ft 0 in (1.83 m)	So	Solna Gymnasium	Stockholm, Sweden
F	3	Destiny Harden	6 ft 0 in (1.83 m)	RS Jr	Morgan Park; West Virginia	Chicago, IL
G	4	Endia Banks	5 ft 9 in (1.75 m)	Sr	Duluth	Duluth, GA
G	5	Mykea Gray	5 ft 4 in (1.63 m)	Sr	National Christian Academy	Upper Marlboro, MD
G	13	Taylor Mason	5 ft 9 in (1.75 m)	Sr	Norcross	Decatur, GA
G/F	14	Nyayongah Gony	6 ft 2 in (1.88 m)	Fr	Lincoln	Lincoln, NE
F	15	Jamir Huston	6 ft 0 in (1.83 m)	Jr	John Hay	Cleveland, OH
G	20	Kelsey Marshall	5 ft 9 in (1.75 m)	Sr	Miami Country Day School	Davie, FL
F	21	Brianna Jackson	6 ft 3 in (1.91 m)	So	Princess Anne	Virginia Beach, VA
G	25	Karla Erjavec	5 ft 10 in (1.78 m)	Jr	Sport Gymnasium; Wyoming	Zagreb, Croatia
F	35	Naomi Mbandu	6 ft 2 in (1.88 m)	Jr	INSEP; Gulf Coast State	Tarbes, France
C	44	Sydnee Roby	6 ft 3 in (1.91 m)	Fr	Rufus King	Milwaukee, WI

Head coach

- Katie Meier (Duke)

Assistant coach(es)

- Octavia Blue (Miami (FL))
- Fitzroy Anthony (Palm Beach Atlantic)
- Kelley Gibson (Maryland)

Legend

- (C) Team captain
- (S) Suspended
- (I) Ineligible
- (W) Walk-on
- Injured
- Current redshirt

Roster
Last update: December 2, 2020

== Schedule ==
Date time, TV	Rank^{#}	Opponent^{#}	Result	Record	Site (attendance) city, state
Non-conference regular season
November 25, 2020*; 1:00 p.m., ACCNX		Jacksonville	W 74–58	1–0	Watsco Center (0); Coral Gables, FL
November 28, 2020*; 3:00 p.m., ACCNX		North Florida	W 81–39	2–0	Watsco Center (0); Coral Gables, FL
December 3, 2020*; 7:30 p.m., ACCNX		Florida Atlantic	W 73–61	3–0	Watsco Center (0); Coral Gables, FL
December 6, 2020*; 2:00 p.m., ACCNX		Stetson	Canceled		Watsco Center; Coral Gables, FL
ACC regular season
December 10, 2020; 8:00 p.m., ACCN		No. 20 Syracuse	L 58–69	3–1 (0–1)	Watsco Center (0); Coral Gables, FL
December 13, 2020; 3:00 p.m., RSN		Duke	Postponed		Watsco Center; Coral Gables, FL
December 14, 2020; 2:00 p.m., ACCN		North Carolina	W 67–63	4–1 (1–1)	Watsco Center (0); Coral Gables, FL
December 17, 2020; 7:00 p.m., ACCNX		at Georgia Tech	Postponed		McCamish Pavilion; Atlanta, GA
December 20, 2020; 1:00 p.m., RSN		at No. 2 Louisville	Postponed		KFC Yum! Center; Louisville, KY
December 20, 2020; Noon, ACCNX		at No. 4 NC State	L 47–78	4–2 (1–2)	Reynolds Coliseum (0); Raleigh, NC
December 31, 2020; 6:00 p.m., ACCN		Notre Dame	L 60–71	4–3 (1–3)	Watsco Center (0); Coral Gables, FL
January 3, 2021; Noon, ACCN		Clemson	W 80–71	5–3 (2–3)	Watsco Center (0); Coral Gables, FL
January 7, 2021; 6:00 p.m., ACCN		at Wake Forest	L 60–63	5–4 (2–4)	LJVM Coliseum (0); Winston–Salem, NC
January 10, 2021; 1:00 p.m., RSN		at North Carolina	W 69–59	6–4 (3–4)	Carmichael Arena (0); Chapel Hill, NC
January 14, 2021; 7:00 p.m., ACCNX		Florida State	Postponed		Watsco Center; Coral Gables, FL
January 17, 2021; Noon, RSN		at No. 24 Syracuse	L 64–99	6–5 (3–5)	Carrier Dome (0); Syracuse, NY
January 21, 2021; 6:00 p.m., ACCN		at Pittsburgh	W 72–68	7–5 (4–5)	Peterson Events Center (500); Pittsburgh, PA
January 26, 2021; 4:00 p.m., ACCN		at No. 1 Louisville	L 76–79	7–6 (4–6)	KFC Yum! Center (2,653); Louisville, KY
January 28, 2021; 7:00 p.m., ACCNX		Georgia Tech	L 56–70	7–7 (4–7)	Watsco Center (0); Coral Gables, FL
January 31, 2021; 1:00 p.m., RSN		Boston College	Postponed		Watsco Center; Coral Gables, FL
February 7, 2021; Noon, ACCNX		Florida State	W 68–53	8–7 (5–7)	Watsco Center (0); Coral Gables, FL
February 11, 2021; 6:00 p.m., ACCN		Virginia Tech	L 55–75	8–8 (5–8)	Watsco Center (0); Coral Gables, FL
February 14, 2021; 2:00 p.m., ACCNX		at Florida State	L 59–67	8–9 (5–9)	Donald L. Tucker Center (1,202); Tallahassee, FL
February 16, 2021; Noon, ACCN		at Georgia Tech	L 56–67	8–10 (5–10)	McCamish Pavilion (1,200); Atlanta, GA
February 18, 2021; 8:00 p.m., ACCNX		Boston College	W 77–60	9–10 (6–10)	Watsco Center (0); Coral Gables, FL
February 21, 2021; 4:00 p.m., ACCN		Virginia	Canceled due to Virginia ending season		Watsco Center; Coral Gables, FL
February 25, 2021; 7:00 p.m., ACCNX		Wake Forest	W 69–67	10–10 (7–10)	Watsco Center (0); Coral Gables, FL
February 28, 2021; 2:00 p.m., ACCNX		at Clemson	W 68–62	11–10 (8–10)	Littlejohn Coliseum (507); Clemson, SC
ACC Women's Tournament
March 4, 2021; 6:00 p.m., RSN	(10)	vs. (7) Virginia Tech; Second Round	L 64–72	11–11	Greensboro Coliseum (451); Greensboro, NC
*Non-conference game. ^{#}Rankings from AP Poll. (#) Tournament seedings in parentheses. All times are in Eastern.

== Rankings ==
Regular season polls
Poll	Pre- Season	Week 2	Week 3	Week 4	Week 5	Week 6	Week 7	Week 8	Week 9	Week 10	Week 11	Week 12	Week 13	Week 14	Week 15	Week 16	Final
AP																	
Coaches																	

Legend
	Increase in ranking
	Decrease in ranking
	Not ranked previous week
(RV)	Received Votes

The Coaches Poll releases a final poll after the NCAA tournament, but the AP Poll does not release a poll at this time. The Coaches Poll does not release a week 2 poll.
