= 2020–21 Florida State Seminoles women's basketball team =

Intercollegiate basketball season

2020–21 Florida State Seminoles women's basketball

NCAA tournament, first round
- Conference: Atlantic Coast Conference
- Record: 10–9 (9–7 ACC)
- Head coach: Brooke Wyckoff (interim)
- Assistant coaches: Joy McCorvey; Morgan Toles
- Home arena: Donald L. Tucker Center (Capacity: 12,100)

2020–21 ACC women's basketball standings
	Conf.				Overall
Team	W		L	PCT	W		L	PCT
No. 8 Louisville	14	–	2	.875	26	–	4	.867
No. 3 NC State†	12	–	2	.857	22	–	3	.880
Georgia Tech	12	–	6	.667	17	–	9	.654
Syracuse	9	–	7	.563	15	–	9	.625
Florida State	9	–	7	.563	10	–	9	.526
Notre Dame	8	–	7	.533	10	–	10	.500
Virginia Tech	8	–	8	.500	15	–	10	.600
North Carolina	8	–	9	.471	13	–	11	.542
Miami (FL)	8	–	10	.444	11	–	11	.500
Wake Forest	8	–	10	.444	12	–	13	.480
Clemson	5	–	12	.294	12	–	14	.462
Pittsburgh	3	–	12	.200	5	–	14	.263
Boston College	2	–	11	.154	7	–	12	.368
Duke	0	–	1	.000	3	–	1	.750
Virginia	0	–	2	.000	0	–	5	.000
† 2021 ACC tournament winner Duke suspended their season on December 25, 2020; Virginia suspended their season on January 14, 2021; As of March 30, 2021; Rankings from AP poll

The 2020–21 Florida State Seminoles women's basketball team, variously Florida State or FSU, represented Florida State University during the 2020–21 NCAA Division I women's basketball season. Florida State competed in Division I of the National Collegiate Athletic Association (NCAA). The Seminoles played their home games at the Donald L. Tucker Center on the university's Tallahassee, Florida campus. They were members of the Atlantic Coast Conference.

Brooke Wyckoff served as the interim head coach for the season as Sue Semrau took the season off to care for her mother.

The Seminoles finished the season 10–9 and 9–7 in ACC play to finish in a tie for fourth place. As the fourth seed in the ACC tournament, they lost to Syracuse in the Quarterfinals. The Seminoles went on to make the NCAA tournament for the eighth consecutive season. As the nine seed in the HemisFair Regional the lost to Oregon State in the First Round.

== Previous season ==
For the 2019–20 season, the Seminoles finished with a record of 24–8, 11–7 in the ACC, finishing in fourth place. Florida State reached the finals of the ACC tournament, finishing as runner-up. The NCAA tournament was canceled due to the coronavirus outbreak. Senior Forward Kiah Gillespie went on to be selected in the third round of the 2020 WNBA draft.

== Off-season ==
=== Departures ===
Name	Number	Pos.	Height	Year	Hometown	Reason for departure
Nicki Ekhomu	12	G	5'9"	Senior	Bolingbrook, IL	Graduated
Nausia Woolfolk	13	G	6'0"	Senior	Fort Valley, GA	Graduated
Kiah Gillespie	15	F	6'2"	(redshirt) Senior	Meriden, CT	Graduated
London Clarkson	34	F	6'2"	Freshman	Pflugerville, TX	Transferred to Virginia

=== Incoming transfers ===
Name	Number	Pos.	Height	Year	Hometown	Previous school
Bianca Jackson	0	G	5'11"	(redshirt) Junior	Montgomery, AL	South Carolina
Sara Bejedi	5	G	5'7"	Sophomore	Helsinki, Finland	Arizona State
Erin Howard	14	F	6'1"	Junior	Madison, WI	Auburn
Tiana England	23	G	5'7"	(redshirt) Senior	Stamford, CT	St. John's

=== Recruiting class ===
Florida State did not have any incoming freshman commits.

== Roster ==
2020–21 Florida State Seminoles women's basketball team
Players
Coaches

Pos.	#	Name	Height	Year	Hometown
G	0	Bianca Jackson	5 ft 11 in (1.8 m)	RS Jr	Montgomery, AL
C	1	River Baldwin	6 ft 5 in (1.96 m)	So	Andalusia, AL
G	2	Sammie Puisis	6 ft 1 in (1.85 m)	So	Mason, OH
G	3	Sayawni Lassiter	5 ft 10 in (1.78 m)	RS Jr	Dorchester, MA
G	4	Amaya Brown	5 ft 11 in (1.8 m)	Jr	Albuquerque, NM
G	5	Sara Bejedi	5 ft 7 in (1.7 m)	RS Fr	Helsinki, Finland
G	10	Kourtney Webber	5 ft 10 in (1.78 m)	Jr	New Orleans, LA
F	12	Savannah Wilkinson	6 ft 0 in (1.83 m)	RS Jr	London, England
F	14	Erin Howard	6 ft 1 in (1.85 m)	Jr	Madison, WI
G	23	Tiana England	5 ft 7 in (1.7 m)	RS Sr	Stamford, CT
G	24	Morgan Jones	6 ft 2 in (1.88 m)	Jr	Jonesboro, GA
F	32	Valencia Myers	6 ft 3 in (1.91 m)	Jr	Solon, OH
G	33	Izabella Nicoletti	5 ft 10 in (1.78 m)	RS So	São Paulo, Brazil

Head coach

- Brooke Wyckoff (Florida State)

Assistant coach(es)

- Joy McCorvey (St. John's)
- Morgan Toles (Florida State)

Legend

- (C) Team captain
- (S) Suspended
- (I) Ineligible
- (W) Walk-on
- Injured
- Current redshirt

Roster
Last update: December 1, 2020

== Schedule and results ==
Date time, TV	Rank^{#}	Opponent^{#}	Result	Record	Site (attendance) city, state
Non-conference regular season
December 1, 2020*; 6:00 p.m., ACCNX		Florida	W 81–75	1–0	Donald L. Tucker Center (1,075); Tallahassee, FL
December 6, 2020*; 2:00 p.m., ACCNX		Austin Peay	Canceled due to COVID-19 issues		Donald L. Tucker Center; Tallahassee, FL
ACC regular season
December 13, 2020; 1:00 p.m., RSN		Virginia	W 69–51	2–0 (1–0)	Donald L. Tucker Center (977); Tallahassee, FL
December 17, 2020; 7:00 p.m., ACCNX		at Clemson	L 69–72	2–1 (1–1)	Littlejohn Coliseum (346); Clemson, SC
December 17, 2020; 8:00 p.m., ACCN		at No. 2 Louisville	Postponed		KFC Yum! Center; Louisville, KY
December 20, 2020; 2:00 p.m., ACCNX		Pittsburgh	W 67–53	3–1 (2–1)	Donald L. Tucker Center (1,150); Tallahassee, FL
December 31, 2020; Noon, ACCNX		at Virginia Tech	W 73–63	4–1 (3–1)	Cassell Coliseum (250); Blacksburg, VA
January 3, 2021; 1:00 p.m.		at Wake Forest	Postponed		LJVM Coliseum; Winston–Salem, NC
January 7, 2021; 7:00 p.m., ACCNX		Duke	Canceled		Donald L. Tucker Center; Tallahassee, FL
January 10, 2021; Noon, ACCNX		No. 2 Louisville	Postponed		Donald L. Tucker Center; Tallahassee, FL
January 14, 2021; 7:00 p.m., ACCNX		at Miami (FL)	Postponed		Watsco Center; Coral Gables, FL
January 17, 2021; 2:00 p.m., RSN		Clemson	Postponed		Donald L. Tucker Center; Tallahassee, FL
January 17, 2021; 3:00 p.m., ESPN		at No. 2 Louisville	L 56–84	4–2 (3–2)	KFC Yum! Center (2,804); Louisville, KY
January 21, 2021; 8:00 p.m., ACCN		No. 2 NC State	Canceled		Donald L. Tucker Center; Tallahassee, FL
January 21, 2021; 7:00 p.m., ACCNX		Clemson	W 95–88 ^{2OT}	5–2 (4–2)	Donald L. Tucker Center (1,112); Tallahassee, FL
January 24, 2021; 1:00 p.m., ACCNX		at Virginia	Canceled		John Paul Jones Arena; Charlottesville, VA
January 24, 2021; 1:00 p.m., ACCN		at Georgia Tech	L 58–66	5–3 (4–3)	McCamish Pavilion (1,200); Atlanta, GA
January 28, 2021; 8:00 p.m., ACCN		at Boston College	Canceled		Conte Forum; Chestnut Hill, MA
January 28, 2021; 6:00 p.m., ACCNX		at Wake Forest	L 59–73	5–4 (4–4)	LJVM Coliseum (0); Winston–Salem, NC
February 4, 2021; 6:00 p.m., ACCNX		at North Carolina	W 61–51	6–4 (5–4)	Carmichael Arena (0); Chapel Hill, NC
February 7, 2021; Noon, ESPNU		at Miami (FL)	L 53–68	6–5 (5–5)	Watsco Center (0); Coral Gables, FL
February 11, 2021; 8:00 p.m., ACCN		Syracuse	W 67–52	7–5 (6–5)	Donald L. Tucker Center (1,156); Tallahassee, FL
February 14, 2021; 2:00 p.m., ACCN		Miami (FL)	W 67–59	8–5 (7–5)	Donald L. Tucker Center (1,202); Tallahassee, FL
February 18, 2021; 6:00 p.m., ACCN		Georgia Tech	L 48–62	8–6 (7–6)	Donald L. Tucker Center (1,128); Tallahassee, FL
February 21, 2021; 2:00 p.m, ACCNX		No. 3 Louisville	W 68–59	9–6 (8–6)	Donald L. Tucker Center (1,258); Tallahassee, FL
February 25, 2021; 7:00 p.m., ACCNX		at Notre Dame	L 64–72	9–7 (8–7)	Purcell Pavilion (114); Notre Dame, IN
February 28, 2021; Noon, RSN		Wake Forest	W 59–51	10–7 (9–7)	Donald L. Tucker Center (1,163); Tallahassee, FL
ACC Women's Tournament
March 5, 2021; 2:30 p.m., RSN	(4)	vs. (5) Syracuse; Quarterfinal	L 67–68	10–8	Greensboro Coliseum (592); Greensboro, NC
NCAA Women's Tournament
March 21, 2021*; 7:30 pm, ESPN2	(9)	vs. (8) Oregon State; First round (Hemisfair Region)	L 59–83	10–9	University Events Center; San Marcos, TX
*Non-conference game. ^{#}Rankings from AP Poll. (#) Tournament seedings in parentheses. All times are in Eastern Time.

== Rankings ==
Ranking movements Legend: ██ Increase in ranking ██ Decrease in ranking — = Not ranked RV = Received votes
	Week																	
Poll	Pre	1	2	3	4	5	6	7	8	9	10	11	12	13	14	15	16	Final
AP	RV	—	—	RV	—	—	—	—	—	—	—	—	—	—	—	—	—	—
Coaches	RV	RV	RV	RV	RV	RV	RV	RV	—	—	—	—	—	—	—	—	—	—

== Honors ==
Weekly awards
Recipient	Award	Ref.
Brooke Wyckoff	ESPNW Coach of the Week	

=== All-ACC ===
- First Team
  - Morgan Jones
- Defensive Team
  - Morgan Jones
