= 2021 ACC women's basketball tournament =

- Classification: Division I
- Season: 2020–21
- Teams: 13
- Site: Greensboro Coliseum; Greensboro, NC
- Champions: NC State (6th title)
- Winning coach: Wes Moore (2nd title)
- MVP: Elissa Cunane (NC State)
- Attendance: 6,252
- Television: ESPN2, ACCN, ACCRSN

2020–21 ACC women's basketball standings
	Conf.				Overall
Team	W		L	PCT	W		L	PCT
No. 8 Louisville	14	–	2	.875	26	–	4	.867
No. 3 NC State†	12	–	2	.857	22	–	3	.880
Georgia Tech	12	–	6	.667	17	–	9	.654
Syracuse	9	–	7	.563	15	–	9	.625
Florida State	9	–	7	.563	10	–	9	.526
Notre Dame	8	–	7	.533	10	–	10	.500
Virginia Tech	8	–	8	.500	15	–	10	.600
North Carolina	8	–	9	.471	13	–	11	.542
Miami (FL)	8	–	10	.444	11	–	11	.500
Wake Forest	8	–	10	.444	12	–	13	.480
Clemson	5	–	12	.294	12	–	14	.462
Pittsburgh	3	–	12	.200	5	–	14	.263
Boston College	2	–	11	.154	7	–	12	.368
Duke	0	–	1	.000	3	–	1	.750
Virginia	0	–	2	.000	0	–	5	.000
† 2021 ACC tournament winner Duke suspended their season on December 25, 2020; Virginia suspended their season on January 14, 2021; As of March 30, 2021; Rankings from AP poll

The 2021 ACC women's basketball tournament concluded the 2020–21 season of the Atlantic Coast Conference and was held at the Greensboro Coliseum in Greensboro, North Carolina, from March 3–7, 2021. NC State defended their title to earn the ACC's automatic bid to the 2021 NCAA Women's Division I Basketball Tournament.

== Seeds ==
All of the ACC teams except Duke and Virginia participated in the tournament. The remaining teams were seeded by record within the conference, with a tiebreaker system to seed teams with identical conference records. The top four seeds received double byes, while seeds 5 through 11 received single byes. The seeds were determined on February 28, 2021, after the final regular season games finished.

Seed	School	Conference Record	Tiebreaker
1	Louisville‡†	14–2	
2	NC State†	12–2	
3	Georgia Tech†	12–6	
4	Florida State†	9–7	1–0 vs. Syracuse
5	Syracuse#	9–7	0–1 vs. Florida State
6	Notre Dame#	8–7	
7	Virginia Tech#	8–8	
8	North Carolina#	8–9	
9	Wake Forest#	8–10	1–1 vs. Miami, 0–1 vs Louisville & NC State, 1–0 vs. Georgia Tech
10	Miami#	8–10	1–1 vs Wake Forest, 0–1 vs Louisville & NC State, 0–1 vs. Georgia Tech
11	Clemson#	5–12	
12	Pittsburgh	3–12	
13	Boston College	2–11	
‡ – ACC regular season champions. † – Received a double-bye in the conference tournament. # – Received a single-bye in the conference tournament.

== Schedule ==
Session	Game	Time	Matchup	Score	Television	Attendance
First round – Wednesday, March 3
Opening day	1	2:00 p.m.	No. 12 Pittsburgh vs No. 13 Boston College	56–67	ACCRSN	156
Second round – Thursday, March 4
1	2	Noon	No. 8 North Carolina vs No. 9 Wake Forest	71–82	ACCRSN	609
1	3	2:30 p.m.	No. 5 Syracuse vs. No. 13 Boston College	67–61	ACCRSN	609
2	4	6:00 p.m.	No. 7 Virginia Tech vs No. 10 Miami	72–64	ACCRSN	451
2	5	8:30 p.m.	No. 6 Notre Dame vs No. 11 Clemson	63–68	ACCRSN	451
Quarterfinals – Friday, March 5
3	6	Noon	No. 1 Louisville vs No. 9 Wake Forest	65–53	ACCRSN	592
3	7	2:30 p.m.	No. 4 Florida State vs No. 5 Syracuse	67–68	ACCRSN	592
4	8	6:00 p.m.	No. 2 NC State vs No. 7 Virginia Tech	68–55	ACCRSN	1,259
4	9	8:30 p.m.	No. 3 Georgia Tech vs No. 11 Clemson	60–57	ACCRSN	1,259
Semifinals – Saturday, March 6
5	10	Noon	No. 1 Louisville vs. No. 5 Syracuse	72–59	ACCN	1,122
5	11	2:30 p.m.	No. 2 NC State vs. No. 3 Georgia Tech	66–61	ACCN	1,122
Championship – Sunday, March 7
6	12	Noon	No. 1 Louisville vs No. 2 NC State	56–58	ESPN2	2,063
Game times in ET. Rankings denote tournament seed.

== Bracket ==
First round Wednesday, March 3
12	Pittsburgh	56
13	Boston College	67

Second round Thursday, March 4
8	North Carolina	71
9	Wake Forest	82
5	Syracuse	67
13	Boston College	61
7	Virginia Tech	72
10	Miami	64
6	Notre Dame	63
11	Clemson	68

Quarterfinals; Friday, March 5
1	Louisville	65
9	Wake Forest	53
4	Florida State	67
5	Syracuse	68
2	NC State	68
7	Virginia Tech	55
3	Georgia Tech	60
11	Clemson	57

Semifinals; Saturday, March 6
1	Louisville	72
5	Syracuse	59
2	NC State	66
3	Georgia Tech	61

Championship; Sunday, March 7
1	Louisville	56
2	NC State	58

== Game summaries ==
=== First round ===
ACCRSN

March 3
2:00 p.m.

Report

No. 12 Pittsburgh 56, No. 13 Boston College 67
Scoring by quarter: 7–14, 19–14, 12–19, 18–20
Pts: Everett (22); Rebs: Brown (9); Asts: Everett/Brown (3)	Pts: Swartz (33); Rebs: Ford/Swartz (6); Asts: Ivey (5)

Greensboro Coliseum
Greensboro, NC
Attendance: 156
Referees: Denise Brooks
Fatou Oissoko-Stephens
Jeff Smith

=== Second round ===
ACCRSN

March 4
Noon

Report

No. 8 North Carolina 71, No. 9 Wake Forest 82
Scoring by quarter: 16–25, 18–14, 20–19, 17–24
Pts: Ustby (23); Rebs: Bailey (10); Asts: Watts (4)	Pts: Spear (29); Rebs: Raca (12); Asts: Conti (12)

Greensboro Coliseum
Greensboro, NC
Referees: Dee Kanter
Pualani Spurlock
Ed Sidlasky

ACCRSN

March 4
2:30 p.m.

Report

No. 5 Syracuse 67, No. 13 Boston College 61
Scoring by quarter: 16–11, 15–16, 15–10, 21–24
Pts: Lewis (21); Rebs: Engstler (15); Asts: Lewis (5)	Pts: Dickens (14); Rebs: Soule/VanTimmeren (7); Asts: Garraud (5)

Greensboro Coliseum
Greensboro, NC
Attendance: 609
Referees: Eric Brewton
Bryan Brunette
Talisa Green

ACCRSN

March 4
6:00 p.m.

Report

No. 7 Virginia Tech 72, No. 10 Miami 64
Scoring by quarter: 24–12, 19–16, 16–19, 13–17
Pts: Kitley (16); Rebs: Gregg (10); Asts: Amoore (5)	Pts: Harden (27); Rebs: Harden (11); Asts: Harden (3)

Greensboro Coliseum
Greensboro, NC
Referees: Joe Vaszily
Tiara Oruse
Luis Gonzalez

ACCRSN

March 4
8:30 p.m.

Report

No. 6 Notre Dame 63, No. 11 Clemson 68
Scoring by quarter: 17–15, 19–16, 18–19, 9–18
Pts: Westbeld (24); Rebs: Westbeld (9); Asts: Miles (8)	Pts: Elliott (25); Rebs: Robinson (8); Asts: Washington (7)

Greensboro Coliseum
Greensboro, NC
Attendance: 451
Referees: Maj Forsberg
Carla Fountain
Bruce Morris

=== Quarterfinals ===
ACCRSN

March 5
Noon

Report

No. 1 Louisville 65, No. 9 Wake Forest 53
Scoring by quarter: 17–10, 15–18, 12–16, 21–9
Pts: Van Lith (24); Rebs: Robinson (8); Asts: Evans (7)	Pts: Raca (13); Rebs: Conti (8); Asts: Conti (5)

Greensboro Coliseum
Greensboro, NC
Referees: Eric Brewton
Luis Gonzalez
Talisa Green

ACCRSN

March 5
2:30 p.m.

Report

No. 4 Florida State 67, No. 5 Syracuse 68
Scoring by quarter: 22–8, 17–19, 16–25, 12–16
Pts: Jackson (25); Rebs: Wilkinson (6); Asts: Jackson (7)	Pts: Cardoso (16); Rebs: Cardoso (13); Asts: Lewis (4)

Greensboro Coliseum
Greensboro, NC
Attendance: 592
Referees: Joe Vaszily
Maj Forsberg
Billy Smith

ACCRSN

March 5
6:00 p.m.

Report

No. 2 NC State 68, No. 7 Virginia Tech 55
Scoring by quarter: 16–16, 17–7, 14–16, 21–16
Pts: Cunane (27); Rebs: Boyd (10); Asts: Perez (6)	Pts: Kitley (20); Rebs: Kitley (9); Asts: Amoore/Sheppard (4)

Greensboro Coliseum
Greensboro, NC
Referees: Karen Preato
Bruce Morris
Carla Fountain

ACCRSN

March 5
8:30 p.m.

Report

No. 3 Georgia Tech 60, No. 11 Clemson 57
Scoring by quarter: 15–15, 18–13, 17–13, 10–16
Pts: Fletcher (21); Rebs: Cubaj (18); Asts: Fletcher (5)	Pts: Washington (24); Rebs: Robinson (7); Asts: Thomas (4)

Greensboro Coliseum
Greensboro, NC
Attendance: 1,259
Referees: Brian Brunette
Ed Sidlasky
Tiara Cruse

=== Semifinals ===
ACCN

March 6
Noon

Report

No. 1 Louisville 72, No. 5 Syracuse 59
Scoring by quarter: 19–13, 18–17, 22–17, 13–12
Pts: Evans (13); Rebs: Cochran (10); Asts: Evans/Van Lith (3)	Pts: Engstler (21); Rebs: Engstler (10); Asts: Djaldi-Tabdi/Lews (3)

Greensboro Coliseum
Greensboro, NC
Referees: Karen Preato
Carla Fountain
Bruce Morris

ACCN

March 6
2:30 p.m.

Report

No. 2 NC State 66, No. 3 Georgia Tech 61
Scoring by quarter: 18–14, 10–19, 15–15, 23–13
Pts: Cunane (23); Rebs: Cunane (9); Asts: Perez (5)	Pts: Cubaj/Lahtinen (17); Rebs: Cubaj (11); Asts: Lahtinen (5)

Greensboro Coliseum
Greensboro, NC
Attendance: 1,122
Referees: Denise Brooks
Maj Forsberg
Billy Smith

=== Final ===
ESPN2

March 7
Noon

Report

No. 1 Louisville 56, No. 2 NC State 58
Scoring by quarter: 16–15, 9–11, 18–14, 13–18
Pts: Evans (15); Rebs: Cochran (8); Asts: Van Lith (3)	Pts: Cunane (20); Rebs: Jones (10); Asts: Brown-Turner/Cunane/Perez (3)

Greensboro Coliseum
Greensboro, NC
Attendance: 2,063
Referees: Eric Brewton
Dee Kantner
Joseph Vaszily

== All-Tournament Teams ==
2021 ACC Women's Basketball All-Tournament Teams
First Team	Second Team
Elissa Cunane – NC State (MVP); Kai Crutchfield – NC State; Dana Evans – Louisville; Kianna Smith – Louisville; Hailey Van Lith – Louisville	Lorela Cubaj – Georgia Tech; Emily Engstler – Syracuse; Elizabeth Kitley – Virginia Tech; Jewel Spear – Wake Forest; Cameron Swartz – Boston College

== See also ==
- 2021 ACC men's basketball tournament
