= 2020 Women's National Invitation Tournament =

Cancelled basketball tournament

- Season: 2019–20
- Teams: 64 (planned)
- Finals site: ,
- Canceled due to the COVID-19 pandemic

The 2020 Women's National Invitation Tournament was to be an annual single-elimination tournament of 64 NCAA Division I basketball teams that were not selected to participate in the 2020 Women's NCAA tournament. The tournament committee was to announce the 64-team field on March 16, following the selection of the NCAA Tournament field. The tournament was set to begin on March 18, 2020, and end on April 4, 2020, with the championship game televised on the CBS Sports Network.

As with all tournaments, due to the COVID-19 pandemic, games were to be held behind closed doors. On March 12, 2020, the NCAA canceled the tournament.

== See also ==
- 2020 National Invitation Tournament
