= Mia Mastrov =

American basketball player (born 2003)

Personal information
- Born: April 1, 2003 (age 22)
- Listed height: 5 ft 11 in (1.80 m)

Career information
- High school: Miramonte High School (Orinda, California)
- College: California (2021–2024)
- Position: Guard
- Number: 21

Mia Mastrov (born April 1, 2003) is an American former college basketball player for the California Golden Bears of the Pac-12 Conference. She was one of the NCAA's highest-paid athletes for her name, image, and likeness (NIL) during her college career.

== Early life and high school career ==
Mastrov grew up in Lafayette, California, and attended Miramonte High School. She averaged 12.2 points, 5.5 rebounds, and 2.9 steals per game in high school and was named all-state three times. She played Amateur Athletic Union (AAU) basketball for the Cal Stars of Orinda, California. She committed to the University of California, Berkeley, in August 2020. She graduated from high school early in January 2021.

== College career ==
Mastrov debuted for the California Golden Bears off the bench on February 5, 2021, scoring a career-high 20 points including four made threes in a 51–62 loss to Utah. She was California's highest-ever debutante scorer and the team's top single-game scorer against a Pac-12 opponent at that point in the 2021–21 season. She started the last five games of her freshman season, averaging 7.0 points and 4.3 rebounds per game. She scored 12 points and grabbed 7 rebounds in a 67–55 win over Arizona State on February 21, 2021.

Mastrov played a backup guard role the following three seasons. She scored 9 points in a 102–60 win over McNeese on December 11, 2021, which was California's first 100-point game under head coach Charmin Smith. She shot 4-for-7 for a season-high 11 points in an 88–52 win over Florida A&M on December 18, 2022. She scored 10 points and grabbed 5 rebounds in a 61–49 loss to Washington State in the first round of the Pac-12 Conference tournament on March 1, 2023. She scored 14 points shooting 6-for-8 with two threes in a season-opening 89–56 win over CSU Bakersfield on November 6, 2023. She averaged 3.0 points and 1.4 rebounds in 13.7 minutes per game for her career.

== Career statistics ==
Legend
| GP | Games played | GS | Games started | MPG | Minutes per game | RPG | Rebounds per game |
| APG | Assists per game | SPG | Steals per game | BPG | Blocks per game | PPG | Points per game |
| TO | Turnovers per game | FG% | Field-goal percentage | 3P% | 3-point field-goal percentage | FT% | Free-throw percentage |
| **Bold** | Career best | ° | League leader |

| Year | Team | GP | GS | MPG | FG% | 3P% | FT% | RPG | APG | SPG | BPG | TO | PPG |
|---|---|---|---|---|---|---|---|---|---|---|---|---|---|
| 2020–21 | California | 6 | **5** | **32.2** | 24.2 | 17.6 | **100.0** | **4.3** | **1.0** | 0.5 | **0.7** | 3.3 | **7.0** |
| 2021–22 | California | 24 | 2 | 11.9 | 31.3 | 25.0 | 76.5 | 1.2 | 0.5 | 0.5 | 0.1 | **0.7** | 2.6 |
| 2022–23 | California | 28 | 0 | 12.0 | 26.7 | 24.5 | 81.3 | 1.1 | 0.7 | 0.3 | 0.0 | 0.8 | 2.6 |
| 2023–24 | California | **30** | 0 | 13.0 | **31.5** | **25.7** | 83.3 | 1.4 | 0.5 | **0.6** | 0.0 | 1.1 | 2.7 |
| **Career** | | 88 | 7 | 13.7 | 28.6 | 23.3 | 82.5 | 1.4 | 0.6 | 0.5 | 0.1 | 1.0 | 3.0 |
Statistics retrieved from Sports-Reference.

== Off the court ==
Mastrov's father, Mark Mastrov, is the founder of fitness center chain 24 Hour Fitness. Her grandfather, Bert Mastrov, played college basketball as part of the first California team under coach Pete Newell.

Mastrov was one of the NCAA's most-followed women's basketball players on social media, with 1.2 million followers across TikTok and Instagram as of March 2024, and one of its highest name, image, and likeness (NIL) earners. Her social media posts include lip syncs, basketball photos, swimsuit photos, and NIL brand partnerships. She is a close friend of Stanford basketball star Cameron Brink, with whom she played AAU youth basketball. She has been a professional model.
