= 2021 Pac-12 Conference Tournament =

2021 Pac-12 Conference Tournament may refer to:

- 2021 Pac-12 Conference men's basketball tournament
- 2021 Pac-12 Conference women's basketball tournament
