= 2020–21 California Golden Bears women's basketball team =

Intercollegiate basketball season

2020–21 California Golden Bears women's basketball
- Conference: Pac-12 Conference
- Record: 1–16 (1–12 Pac-12)
- Head coach: Charmin Smith (2nd season)
- Assistant coaches: Kai Felton; Wendale Farrow; April Phillips
- Home arena: Haas Pavilion

2020–21 Pac-12 Conference women's basketball standings
	Conf.				Overall
Team	W		L	PCT	W		L	PCT
No. 2 Stanford†	19	–	2	.905	31	–	2	.939
No. 11 Arizona	13	–	4	.765	21	–	6	.778
No. 9 UCLA	12	–	4	.750	17	–	6	.739
No. 23 Oregon	10	–	7	.588	15	–	9	.625
Oregon State	7	–	6	.538	12	–	8	.600
Colorado	8	–	8	.500	12	–	11	.522
Washington State	9	–	10	.474	12	–	12	.500
USC	8	–	10	.444	11	–	12	.478
Arizona State	6	–	9	.400	11	–	12	.478
Utah	4	–	15	.211	5	–	16	.238
Washington	3	–	13	.188	7	–	14	.333
California	1	–	12	.077	1	–	16	.059
† 2021 Pac-12 Tournament winner As of March 29, 2021; Rankings from AP poll

The 2020–21 California Golden Bears women's basketball team represented University of California, Berkeley during the 2020–21 NCAA Division I women's basketball season. The Golden Bears, led by second year head coach Charmin Smith, played their home games at the Haas Pavilion as members of the Pac-12 Conference.

== Previous season ==
The Golden Bears finished the season 12–19, 3–15 in Pac-12 play to finish in twelfth place. They advanced to the Quarterfinals of the Pac-12 women's tournament where they lost to Arizona. The NCAA tournament and WNIT were cancelled due to the COVID-19 pandemic.

== Roster ==
2020–21 California Golden Bears women's basketball team
Players
Coaches

Pos.	#	Name	Height	Year	Previous school	Hometown
F	0	Michelle Onyiah	6 ft 3 in (1.91 m)	Fr	Eleanor Roosevelt	Eastvale, CA
G	1	Leilani McIntosh	5 ft 5 in (1.65 m)	So	Xavier College Prep	Phoenix, AZ
G	2	Cailyn Crocker	5 ft 9 in (1.75 m)	So	Mater Dei	Cypress, CA
G/F	3	Dalayah Daniels	6 ft 3 in (1.91 m)	Fr	Garfield	Seattle, WA
G	10	Jazlen Green	5 ft 11 in (1.8 m)	So	Lakeside	Upland, CA
G	14	Alma Elsnitz	5 ft 11 in (1.8 m)	Fr	Lulea Basketgymnasium	Stockholm, Sweden
G	21	Mia Mastrov	5 ft 11 in (1.8 m)	Fr	Miramonte	Lafayette, CA
G	22	Archer Olson	6 ft 0 in (1.83 m)	Sr	Henry M. Gunn	Palo Alto, CA
F	24	Evelien Lutje Schipholt	6 ft 2 in (1.88 m)	So	Caland Lyceum	The Hague, The Netherlands
G	31	Ornela Muca	5 ft 7 in (1.7 m)	Fr	American Community School of Athens	Athens, Greece
C	32	Sela Heide	6 ft 7 in (2.01 m)	Fr	Mount Si	North Bend, WA
C	33	Fatou Samb	6 ft 4 in (1.93 m)	Fr	Westside	Houston, TX
G	34	Sierra Richey	5 ft 10 in (1.78 m)	Jr	Rancho Campana	Camarillo, CA

Head coach

- Charmin Smith (Stanford)

Assistant coach(es)

- Kai Felton (Randolph–Macon)
- Wendale Farrow (Eastern Michigan)
- April Phillips (Xavier)

Legend

- (C) Team captain
- (S) Suspended
- (I) Ineligible
- (W) Walk-on
- Injured
- Current redshirt

Roster
Last update: May 25, 2021

== Schedule ==
Date time, TV	Rank^{#}	Opponent^{#}	Result	Record	Site (attendance) city, state
Regular Season
November 25, 2020*; 4:00 p.m.		San Jose State	L 48–56	0–1	Haas Pavilion (0); Berkeley, CA
November 29, 2020*; 2:00 p.m.		Cal State Bakersfield	L 52–60	0–2	Haas Pavilion (0); Berkeley, CA
December 4, 2020; 6:00 p.m., P12N		Washington	L 53–80	0–3 (0–1)	Haas Pavilion (0); Berkeley, CA
December 6, 2020		Washington State	Canceled		Haas Pavilion; Berkeley, CA
December 10, 2020; 6:00 p.m.		San Francisco	L 62–67	0–4	Haas Pavilion (0); Berkeley, CA
December 13, 2020; 7:00 p.m., P12N		No. 1 Stanford	L 38–83	0–5 (0–2)	Haas Pavilion (0); Berkeley, CA
December 19, 2020; Noon, P12N		at No. 11 UCLA	L 37–71	0–6 (0–3)	Pauley Pavilion (0); Los Angeles, CA
December 21, 2020; 2:00 p.m., P12N		at USC	L 54–77	0–7 (0–4)	Galen Center (0); Los Angeles, CA
January 1, 2021; 5:30 p.m., P12N		at Arizona State	L 53–56	0–8 (0–5)	Desert Financial Arena (0); Tempe, AZ
January 3, 2021; Noon, P12N		at No. 6 Arizona	L 33–69	0–9 (0–6)	McKale Center (0); Tucson, AZ
January 8, 2021; 2:00 p.m., P12N		Oregon State	Canceled		Haas Pavilion; Berkeley, CA
January 10, 2021; 1:00 p.m., P12N		No. 11 Oregon	L 41–100	0–10 (0–7)	Haas Pavilion (0); Berkeley, CA
January 15, 2021; 3:00 p.m., P12N		at Colorado	L 59–75	0–11 (0–8)	CU Events Center (0); Boulder, CO
January 17, 2021; 11:00 a.m., P12N		at Utah	Canceled		Jon M. Huntsman Center; Salt Lake City, UT
January 22, 2021; 4:00 p.m.		USC	Canceled		Haas Pavilion; Berkeley, CA
January 24, 2021; 3:00 p.m.		No. 6 UCLA	Canceled		Haas Pavilion; Berkeley, CA
January 29, 2021; 8:00 p.m.		at Washington	Canceled		Alaska Airlines Arena; Seattle, WA
January 31, 2021; Noon		at Washington State	Canceled		Beasley Coliseum; Pullman, WA
February 5, 2021; 7:00 p.m.		Utah	L 51–62	0–12 (0–9)	Haas Pavilion (0); Berkeley, CA
February 7, 2021; 1:00 p.m.		Colorado	L 52–67	0–13 (0–10)	Haas Pavilion (0); Berkeley, CA
February 12, 2021 p.m., P12N		at No. 11 Oregon	Canceled		Matthew Knight Arena; Eugene, OR
February 14, 2021; 1:00 p.m.		at Oregon State	Canceled		Gill Coliseum; Corvallis, OR
February 19, 2021; 12:30 p.m., P12N		No. 10 Arizona	L 50–59	0–14 (0–11)	Haas Pavilion (0); Berkeley, CA
February 21, 2021; 1:00 p.m., P12N		Arizona State	W 67–55	1–14 (1–11)	Haas Pavilion (0); Berkeley, CA
February 28, 2021; 1:00 p.m., P12N		at No. 4 Stanford	L 33–72	1–15 (1–12)	Maples Pavilion (0); Stanford, CA
Pac-12 Women's Tournament
March 3, 2021; 11:00 p.m., P12N	(12)	vs. (5) Oregon State; First Round	L 63–71	1–16	Michelob Ultra Arena; Paradise, NV
*Non-conference game. ^{#}Rankings from AP Poll. (#) Tournament seedings in parentheses. All times are in Pacific Time.

== Rankings ==
Regular season polls
Poll	Pre- Season	Week 2	Week 3	Week 4	Week 5	Week 6	Week 7	Week 8	Week 9	Week 10	Week 11	Week 12	Week 13	Week 14	Week 15	Week 16	Final
AP																	
Coaches																	

Legend
	Increase in ranking
	Decrease in ranking
	No change
(RV)	Received votes
(NR)	Not ranked

Coaches did not release a Week 2 poll and AP does not release a poll after the NCAA Tournament.

== See also ==
2020–21 California Golden Bears men's basketball team
