= 2020–21 Arizona Wildcats women's basketball team =

Intercollegiate basketball season

2020–21 Arizona Wildcats women's basketball

NCAA tournament, runner-up
- Conference: Pac-12 Conference

Ranking
- Coaches: No. 2
- AP: No. 11
- Record: 21–6 (13–4 Pac-12)
- Head coach: Adia Barnes (5th season)
- Assistant coaches: Tamisha Augustin; Salvo Coppa; Jackie Nared
- Home arena: McKale Center

2020–21 Pac-12 Conference women's basketball standings
	Conf.				Overall
Team	W		L	PCT	W		L	PCT
No. 2 Stanford†	19	–	2	.905	31	–	2	.939
No. 11 Arizona	13	–	4	.765	21	–	6	.778
No. 9 UCLA	12	–	4	.750	17	–	6	.739
No. 23 Oregon	10	–	7	.588	15	–	9	.625
Oregon State	7	–	6	.538	12	–	8	.600
Colorado	8	–	8	.500	12	–	11	.522
Washington State	9	–	10	.474	12	–	12	.500
USC	8	–	10	.444	11	–	12	.478
Arizona State	6	–	9	.400	11	–	12	.478
Utah	4	–	15	.211	5	–	16	.238
Washington	3	–	13	.188	7	–	14	.333
California	1	–	12	.077	1	–	16	.059
† 2021 Pac-12 Tournament winner As of March 29, 2021; Rankings from AP poll

The 2020–21 Arizona Wildcats women's basketball team represented University of Arizona during the 2020–21 NCAA Division I women's basketball season. The Wildcats, led by fifth-year head coach Adia Barnes, play their home games at the McKale Center and are members of the Pac-12 Conference. The Wildcats finished the season second behind Stanford in the Pacific-12 conference with a 13–4 record. They advanced to the semifinals of the 2021 Pac-12 women's tournament where they lost to no. 9 ranked UCLA and As a no. 3 seed in the NCAA tournament where they defeated Stony Brook and BYU in the first and second rounds, no. 4 ranked Texas A&M in the Sweet Sixteen, they won their region with a win over no. 12 ranked Indiana in the first-ever Elite Eight, knocked off no. 1 ranked UConn in the first-ever Final Four. Arizona reached the first-ever National Championship game, losing to no. 2 ranked Stanford (in a rematch from earlier this season) 54–53 and finishing the season with a 21–6 record.

== Previous season ==
The Wildcats finished the season 24–7, 12–6 in Pac-12 play to finish in fourth place. They advanced to the semifinals of the Pac-12 women's tournament where they lost to Oregon. The NCAA tournament and WNIT were cancelled due to the COVID-19 pandemic.

== Offseason ==
=== Departures ===
Arizona Wildcats Departures
Name	Number	Pos.	Height	Year	Hometown	Notes
Birna Valgerður Benónýsdóttir	15	Center	6 ft 2 in (187 cm)	2000	Keflavík	Transferred to Binghampton

Incoming transfers
Name	Number	Position	Height	Year	Hometown	Previous School	Remaining Eligibility	Notes
	--							

=== Recruits ===
College recruiting information
Name	Hometown	School	Height	Weight	Commit date
Madison Conner; G	Chandler, AZ	Arizona Compass Prep	5 ft 11 in (1.80 m)	N/A	Apr 20, 2020
Madison Conner; G	Recruit ratings: ESPN: (91)				
Lauren Ware; F	Bismarck, ND	Century HS	6 ft 3 in (1.91 m)	N/A	Jul 11, 2020
Lauren Ware; F	Recruit ratings: ESPN: (97)				
Derin Erdoğan; G	Istanbul, Turkey	İstanbul Üniversitesi SK	5 ft 6 in (1.68 m)	N/A	Sep 25, 2020
Derin Erdoğan; G	Recruit ratings: No ratings found				
Marta Garcia; G	Sevilla, Spain	Segle XXI	6 ft 3 in (1.91 m)	N/A	Jan 30, 2020
Marta Garcia; G	Recruit ratings: No ratings found				
Overall recruit ranking:
Note: In many cases, Scout, Rivals, 247Sports, On3, and ESPN may conflict in their listings of height and weight.; In these cases, the average was taken. ESPN grades are on a 100-point scale.; Sources: "2020 Player Commits". ESPN.; "2020 Team Ranking". Rivals.

==== 2021 recruiting class ====
College recruiting information (2021)
Name	Hometown	School	Height	Weight	Commit date
Aaronette Vonleh; G	West Linn, OR	West Linn HS	6 ft 3 in (1.91 m)	N/A	Jul 11, 2020
Aaronette Vonleh; G	Recruit ratings: ESPN: (91)				
Anna Gret Asi; G	Tartu, Estonia	University of Tartu	5 ft 10 in (1.78 m)	N/A	Jul 13, 2020
Anna Gret Asi; G	Recruit ratings: No ratings found				
Gisela Sánchez; F	Barcelona, Spain	Segle XXI	6 ft 3 in (1.91 m)	N/A	Feb 11, 2021
Gisela Sánchez; F	Recruit ratings: No ratings found				
Overall recruit ranking:
Note: In many cases, Scout, Rivals, 247Sports, On3, and ESPN may conflict in their listings of height and weight.; In these cases, the average was taken. ESPN grades are on a 100-point scale.; Sources: "2021 Player Commits". ESPN.; "2021 Team Ranking". Rivals.

==== 2022 recruiting class ====
College recruiting information (2022)
Name	Hometown	School	Height	Weight	Commit date
Maya Nnaji; F	Lakeville, MN	Hopkins High School	6 ft 4 in (1.93 m)	N/A	May 10, 2021
Maya Nnaji; F	Recruit ratings: ESPN: (98)				
Paris Clark; G	Mount Vernon, NY	Long Island Lutheran High School	5 ft 8 in (1.73 m)	N/A	Dec 13, 2021
Paris Clark; G	Recruit ratings: ESPN: (96)				
Kailyn Gilbert; G	Tampa, FL	Seffner Christian Academy	5 ft 8 in (1.73 m)	N/A	Jan 6, 2021
Kailyn Gilbert; G	Recruit ratings: ESPN: (95)				
Lemyah Hylton; G	London, ON	Southwest Academy Girls Prep	5 ft 11 in (1.80 m)	N/A	Oct 16, 2021
Lemyah Hylton; G	Recruit ratings: ESPN: (91)				
Overall recruit ranking: ESPN: 6
Note: In many cases, Scout, Rivals, 247Sports, On3, and ESPN may conflict in their listings of height and weight.; In these cases, the average was taken. ESPN grades are on a 100-point scale.; Sources: "2022 Player Commits". ESPN.; "2022 Team Ranking". Rivals.

== Personnel ==
=== Roster ===
2020–21 Arizona Wildcats women's basketball team
Players
Coaches

Pos.	#	Name	Height	Year	Previous school	Hometown
F	0	Trinity Baptiste	6 ft 0 in (1.83 m)	Sr	Hillsborough; Virginia Tech	Tampa, FL
G	1	Shaina Pellington	5 ft 8 in (1.73 m)	RS Jr	Dunbarton; Oklahoma	Pickering, ON
G	2	Aari McDonald	5 ft 7 in (1.7 m)	RS Sr	Brookside Christian HS; Washington	Fresno, CA
G	3	Tara Manumaleuga	5 ft 10 in (1.78 m)	So	Hillcrest Christian	Gold Coast, QLD, Australia
G	4	Madison Conner	5 ft 11 in (1.8 m)	Fr	AZ Compass Prep	Chandler, AZ
G	10	Derin Erdoğan	5 ft 6 in (1.68 m)	Fr	İstanbul Üniversitesi SK	Istanbul, Turkey
G	11	Mara Mote	5 ft 11 in (1.8 m)	So	TTT Riga	Cēsis, Latvia
G	13	Helena Pueyo	6 ft 3 in (1.91 m)	So	Segle XXI	Palma de Mallorca, Spain
F	14	Sam Thomas	6 ft 0 in (1.83 m)	Sr	Centennial	Bloomfield Hills, MI
G	22	Marta García	6 ft 3 in (1.91 m)	Fr	Segle XXI	Sevilla, Spain
G	23	Bendu Yeaney	5 ft 10 in (1.78 m)	Jr	St. Mary's Academy; Indiana	Portland, OR
F	25	Cate Reese	6 ft 2 in (1.88 m)	Jr	Cypress	Cypress, TX
F	32	Lauren Ware	6 ft 5 in (1.96 m)	Fr	Century	Bismarck, ND
C	34	Semaj Smith	6 ft 6 in (1.98 m)	Jr	St. Anthony	Long Beach, CA

Head coach

- Adia Barnes (Arizona)

Assistant coach(es)

- Tamisha Augustin (Alabama A&M)
- Salvo Coppa (IULM)
- Jackie Nared (Saint Mary's)

Legend

- (C) Team captain
- (S) Suspended
- (I) Ineligible
- (W) Walk-on
- Injured
- Current redshirt

Roster
Last update: March 17, 2021

- Madison Conner was only on the roster for the spring semester of 2020/2021 season, joining the team in March 2021, after reclassify from 2021 season class.

== Schedule ==
Date time, TV	Rank^{#}	Opponent^{#}	Result	Record	Site (attendance) city, state
Regular Season
November 29, 2020*; Noon	No. 7	Northern Arizona	W 76–63	1–0	McKale Center (0); Tucson, AZ
December 4, 2020; 7:00 p.m., P12N	No. 7	No. 9 UCLA	W 68–65	2–0 (1–0)	McKale Center (0); Tucson, AZ
December 6, 2020; 1:00 p.m.	No. 7	USC	W 78–77	3–0 (2–0)	McKale Center (0); Tucson, AZ
December 10, 2020; 4:00 p.m., P12N	No. 6	Arizona State; Territorial Cup	W 65–37	4–0 (3–0)	McKale Center (0); Tucson, AZ
December 18, 2020; 5:00 p.m., P12N	No. 6	at Colorado	W 62–59	5–0 (4–0)	CU Events Center (0); Boulder, CO
December 20, 2020; Noon, P12N	No. 6	at Utah	W 77–60	6–0 (5–0)	Jon M. Huntsman Center (0); Salt Lake City, UT
December 23, 2020*; Noon	No. 6	Idaho	W 96–42	7–0	McKale Center (0); Tucson, AZ
January 1, 2021; 5:00 p.m., P12N	No. 6	No. 1 Stanford	L 54–81	7–1 (5–1)	McKale Center (0); Tucson, AZ
January 3, 2021; Noon, P12N	No. 6	California	W 69–33	8–1 (6–1)	McKale Center (0); Tucson, AZ
January 8, 2021; 9:00 p.m., P12N	No. 7	at Washington	Postponed		Alaska Airlines Arena; Seattle, WA
January 10, 2021; Noon, P12N	No. 7	at Washington State	L 69–71 ^{OT}	8–2 (6–2)	Beasley Coliseum (0); Pullman, WA
January 14, 2021; 5:00 p.m., ESPN	No. 11	No. 10 Oregon	W 57–41	9–2 (7–2)	McKale Center (0); Tucson, AZ
January 17, 2021; 2:00 p.m., P12N	No. 11	Oregon State	W 67–51	10–2 (8–2)	McKale Center (0); Tucson, AZ
January 22, 2021; 4:00 p.m., P12N	No. 10	Utah	W 66–54	11–2 (9–2)	McKale Center (0); Tucson, AZ
January 24, 2021; 1:00 p.m., P12N	No. 10	Colorado	Postponed		McKale Center; Tucson, AZ
January 29, 2021; 5:00 p.m., P12N	No. 10	at USC	Postponed		Galen Center; Los Angeles, CA
January 31, 2021; 4:00 p.m., P12N	No. 10	at No. 5 UCLA	Postponed		Pauley Pavilion; Los Angeles, CA
February 5, 2021; 5:00 p.m., P12N	No. 9	at Oregon State	Postponed		Gill Coliseum; Corvallis, OR
February 8, 2021; 5:00 p.m., ESPN2	No. 10	at No. 11 Oregon	W 79–59	12–2 (10–2)	Matthew Knight Arena (0); Eugene, OR
February 12, 2021; 7:00 p.m., P12N	No. 10	Washington State	W 60–51	13–2 (11–2)	McKale Center (0); Tucson, AZ
February 14, 2021; Noon, P12N	No. 10	Washington	W 73–53	14–2 (12–2)	McKale Center (0); Tucson, AZ
February 19, 2021; 1:30 p.m., P12N	No. 10	at California	W 59–50	15–2 (13–2)	Haas Pavilion (0); Berkeley, CA
February 22, 2021; 7:00 p.m., ESPN2	No. 9	at No. 4 Stanford	L 48–62	15–3 (13–3)	Maples Pavilion (1); Stanford, CA
February 28, 2021; Noon, P12N	No. 9	at Arizona State; Territorial Cup	L 64–66	15–4 (13–4)	Desert Financial Arena (0); Tempe, AZ
Pac-12 Women's Tournament
March 4, 2021; 6:00 p.m., P12N	(2) No. 11	vs. (7) Washington State; Quarterfinals	W 60–44	16–4	Michelob Ultra Arena (41); Paradise, NV
March 5, 2021; 9:00 p.m., P12N	(2) No. 11	vs. (3) No. 9 UCLA; Semifinals	L 49–58	16–5	Michelob Ultra Arena (0); Paradise, NV
NCAA tournament
March 22, 2021*; 11:00 a.m., ESPN2	(3 M) No. 11	vs. (14 M) Stony Brook; First Round	W 79–44	17–5	Alamodome; San Antonio, TX
March 24, 2021*; 5:00 pm, ESPNU	(3 M) No. 11	vs. (11 M) BYU; 2nd Round	W 52–46	18–5	UTSA Convocation Center; San Antonio, TX
March 27, 2021*; 5:00 pm, ESPN2	(3 M) No. 11	vs. (2 M) No. 4 Texas A&M; Sweet 16	W 74–59	19–5	Alamodome (2,434); San Antonio, TX
March 29, 2021*; 5:00 pm, ESPN	(3 M) No. 11	vs. (4 M) No. 12 Indiana; Elite Eight	W 66–53	20–5	Alamodome; San Antonio, TX
April 2, 2021*; 5:30 pm, ESPN	(3 M) No. 11	vs. (1 R) No. 1 UConn; Final Four	W 69–59	21–5	Alamodome; San Antonio, TX
April 4, 2021*; 3:00 pm, ESPN	(3 M) No. 11	vs. (1 A) No. 2 Stanford; National Championship	L 53–54	21–6	Alamodome (4,604); San Antonio, TX
*Non-conference game. ^{#}Rankings from AP Poll. (#) Tournament seedings in parentheses. M=Mercado R=River Walk. All times are in Mountain Time.

== Rankings ==
Ranking movement Legend: ██ Increase in ranking. ██ Decrease in ranking. NR = Not ranked. RV = Received votes.
Poll	Pre	Wk 2	Wk 3	Wk 4	Wk 5	Wk 6	Wk 7	Wk 8	Wk 9	Wk 10	Wk 11	Wk 12	Wk 13	Wk 14	Wk 15	Wk 16	Final
AP	7	7	6	6	6	6	7	11	10	10	9	10	10	9	11	11	11
Coaches	8	6	6	7-T	8	10	13	10	9	9	8	7	9	11	11	11	2
