= 2020–21 Oregon State Beavers women's basketball team =

American college basketball season

2020–21 Oregon State Beavers women's basketball

NCAA tournament, first round
- Conference: Pac-12 Conference
- Record: 12–8 (7–6 Pac-12)
- Head coach: Scott Rueck (11th season)
- Associate head coach: Jonas Chatterton
- Assistant coaches: Brian Holsinger; Katie Faulkner
- Home arena: Gill Coliseum

2020–21 Pac-12 Conference women's basketball standings
	Conf.				Overall
Team	W		L	PCT	W		L	PCT
No. 2 Stanford†	19	–	2	.905	31	–	2	.939
No. 11 Arizona	13	–	4	.765	21	–	6	.778
No. 9 UCLA	12	–	4	.750	17	–	6	.739
No. 23 Oregon	10	–	7	.588	15	–	9	.625
Oregon State	7	–	6	.538	12	–	8	.600
Colorado	8	–	8	.500	12	–	11	.522
Washington State	9	–	10	.474	12	–	12	.500
USC	8	–	10	.444	11	–	12	.478
Arizona State	6	–	9	.400	11	–	12	.478
Utah	4	–	15	.211	5	–	16	.238
Washington	3	–	13	.188	7	–	14	.333
California	1	–	12	.077	1	–	16	.059
† 2021 Pac-12 Tournament winner As of March 29, 2021; Rankings from AP poll

The 2020–21 Oregon State Beavers women's basketball team represented Oregon State University during the 2020–21 NCAA Division I women's basketball season. The Beavers, led by eleventh year head coach Scott Rueck, played their games at the Gill Coliseum as members of the Pac-12 Conference.

== Roster ==
2020–21 Oregon State Beavers women's basketball team
Players
Coaches

Pos.	#	Name	Height	Year	Previous school	Hometown
G	1	Aleah Goodman	5 ft 9 in (1.75 m)	Sr	La Salle HS	Milwaukie, OR
F	2	Andrea Aquino	6 ft 9 in (2.06 m)	RS So	Ribet Academy	Caacupé, Paraguay
G	4	Noelle Mannen	5 ft 6 in (1.68 m)	RS So	Valley Catholic	North Plains, OR
F	5	Taya Corosdale	6 ft 3 in (1.91 m)	RS Jr	Bothell HS	Bothell, WA
F/C	12	Jelena Mitrović	6 ft 9 in (2.06 m)	RS Fr	–	Novi Sad, Serbia
G	13	Sasha Goforth	6 ft 1 in (1.85 m)	Fr	Fayetteville HS	Fayetteville, AR
F	20	Ellie Mack	6 ft 3 in (1.91 m)	RS Sr	Conestoga; Bucknell	Paoli, PA
G	21	Talia Von Oelhoffen	5 ft 11 in (1.8 m)	Fr	Chiawana HS	Pasco, WA
G	24	Savannah Samuel	6 ft 1 in (1.85 m)	Fr	St. Francis HS	Woodstock, GA
F	41	Jovana Subasic	6 ft 1 in (1.85 m)	RS Sr	Washington State	Šabac, Serbia
F	42	Kennedy Brown	6 ft 6 in (1.98 m)	So	Derby High School	Derby, KS
G	43	Jasmine Simmons	5 ft 11 in (1.8 m)	Jr	Australian Institute of Sport	Mildura, Australia
F	44	Taylor Jones	6 ft 4 in (1.93 m)	So	Dallas Christian	Forney, TX

Head coach

- Scott Rueck (Oregon State)

Assistant coach(es)

- Jonas Chatterton (Utah)
- Brian Holsinger (Western Washington)
- Katie Faulkner (Montana)

Legend

- (C) Team captain
- (S) Suspended
- (I) Ineligible
- (W) Walk-on
- Injured
- Current redshirt

Roster

== Schedule ==
Date time, TV	Rank^{#}	Opponent^{#}	Result	Record	Site (attendance) city, state
Non-conference regular season
11/28/2020*; 2:00 pm	No. 18	Montana Western	W 88–54	1–0	Gill Coliseum (0); Corvallis, OR
11/30/2020*; 6:00 pm	No. 17	Carroll College	Postponed due to Covid-19 issues		Gill Coliseum; Corvallis, OR
12/03/2020*; 2:00 pm	No. 17	San Francisco	W 89–60	2–0	Gill Coliseum (0); Corvallis, OR
Pac-12 regular season
12/06/2020; 5:00 pm, P12N	No. 17	Colorado	W 70–53	3–0 (1–0)	Gill Coliseum (0); Corvallis, OR
12/08/2020; 6:00 pm, P12N	No. 15	Utah	L 79–85	3–1 (1–1)	Gill Coliseum (0); Corvallis, OR
12/13/2020; 4:00 pm, P12N	No. 21	No. 7 Oregon; Rivalry	L 59–79	3–2 (1–2)	Gill Coliseum (0); Corvallis, OR
12/19/2020; 12:00 pm, P12N		at Washington State	L 55–61	3–3 (1–3)	Beasley Coliseum (0); Pullman, WA
12/21/2020; 2:00 pm, P12N		at Washington	Postponed due to COVID-19 issues		Alaska Airlines Arena; Seattle, WA
01/01/2021; TBA		No. 11 UCLA	Postponed due to COVID-19 issues		Gill Coliseum; Corvallis, OR
01/03/2021; TBA		USC	Postponed due to COVID-19 issues		Gill Coliseum; Corvallis, OR
01/08/2021; 2:00 pm, P12N		at California	Postponed due to COVID-19 issues		Haas Pavilion; Berkeley, CA
01/10/2021; 3:00 pm, P12N		at No. 1 Stanford	Postponed due to COVID-19 issues		Kaiser Permanente Arena; Santa Cruz, CA
01/15/2021; 4:30 pm, P12N		at Arizona State	Postponed due to COVID-19 issues		Desert Financial Arena; Tempe, AZ
01/17/2021; 1:00 pm, P12N		at No. 11 Arizona	L 51–67	3–4 (1–4)	McKale Center; Tucson, AZ
01/22/2021; 7:00 pm, P12N		Washington	Postponed due to COVID-19 issues		Gill Coliseum; Corvallis, OR
01/24/2021; 2:00 pm, P12N		Washington State	L 75–77 ^{OT}	3–5 (1–5)	Gill Coliseum; Corvallis, OR
01/26/2021; 4:00 pm, P12N		Washington; Rescheduled from January 22	W 98–68	4–5 (2–5)	Gill Coliseum; Corvallis, OR
01/29/2021; 5:00 pm, P12N		at Colorado	W 72–64	5–5 (3–5)	CU Events Center; Boulder, CO
01/31/2021; 11:00 am, P12N		at Utah	W 84–74	6–5 (4–5)	Jon M. Huntsman Center; Salt Lake City, UT
02/05/2021; 4:00 pm, P12N		No. 9 Arizona	Postponed due to COVID-19 issues		Gill Coliseum; Corvallis, OR
02/07/2021; 12:00 pm, P12N		Arizona State	Postponed due to COVID-19 issues		Gill Coliseum; Corvallis, OR
02/13/2021; 6:00 pm		No. 6 Stanford	L 58–83	6–6 (4–6)	Gill Coliseum; Corvallis, OR
02/14/2021; 1:00 pm		California	Postponed due to COVID-19 issues		Gill Coliseum; Corvallis, OR
02/19/2021; 2:30 pm, P12N		at USC	W 77–52	7–6 (5–6)	Galen Center; Los Angeles, CA
02/21/2021; 1:00 pm, ESPN2		at No. 8 UCLA	W 71–64	8–6 (6–6)	Pauley Pavilion; Los Angeles, CA
02/28/2021; 3:00 pm, P12N		at No. 14 Oregon; Rivalry	W 71–63	9–6 (7–6)	Matthew Knight Arena; Eugene, OR
Pac-12 Women's Tournament
03/03/2021; 11:00 am, P12N	(5)	vs. (11) California; First Round	W 71–63	10–6	Michelob Ultra Arena; Paradise, NV
03/04/2021; 11:00 am, P12N	(5)	vs. (4) No. 19 Oregon; Quarterfinals/Rivalry	W 71–64	11–6	Michelob Ultra Arena; Paradise, NV
03/05/2021; 5:00 pm, P12N	(5)	vs. (1) No. 4 Stanford; Semifinals	L 45–79	11–7	Michelob Ultra Arena; Paradise, NV
NCAA Women's Tournament
03/21/2021; 4:30 pm, ESPN2	(8 H)	vs. (9 H) Florida State; First Round	W 83–59	12–7	Strahan Arena; San Marcos, TX
03/23/2021; 4:00 pm, ESPN	(8 H)	vs. (1 H) No. 6 South Carolina; Second Round	L 42–59	12–8	Alamodome; San Antonio, TX
*Non-conference game. ^{#}Rankings from AP Poll. (#) Tournament seedings in parentheses. H=HemisFair. All times are in Pacific Time.

== Rankings ==
2020–21 NCAA Division I women's basketball rankings

Regular season polls
Poll	Pre- Season	Week 2	Week 3	Week 4	Week 5	Week 6	Week 7	Week 8	Week 9	Week 10	Week 11	Week 12	Week 13	Week 14	Week 15	Week 16	Week 17	Week 18	Week 19	Final
AP	18	17	15-T	21	RV	RV	RV								RV					
Coaches	17	17^	15	21	RV	RV								RV	RV					

Legend
	Increase in ranking
	Decrease in ranking
	Not ranked previous week
RV	Received votes
NR	Not ranked
( )	First place votes received

^Coaches did not release a Week 2 poll

== See also ==
- 2020–21 Oregon State Beavers men's basketball team
