= 2020–21 Washington Huskies women's basketball team =

American college basketball season

2020–21 Washington Huskies women's basketball
- Conference: Pac-12 Conference
- Record: 7–13 (3–13 Pac-12)
- Head coach: Jody Wynn (4th season)
- Associate head coach: Derek Wynn
- Assistant coaches: Tamara McDonald; Paul Reed
- Home arena: Alaska Airlines Arena

2020–21 Pac-12 Conference women's basketball standings
	Conf.				Overall
Team	W		L	PCT	W		L	PCT
No. 2 Stanford†	19	–	2	.905	31	–	2	.939
No. 11 Arizona	13	–	4	.765	21	–	6	.778
No. 9 UCLA	12	–	4	.750	17	–	6	.739
No. 23 Oregon	10	–	7	.588	15	–	9	.625
Oregon State	7	–	6	.538	12	–	8	.600
Colorado	8	–	8	.500	12	–	11	.522
Washington State	9	–	10	.474	12	–	12	.500
USC	8	–	10	.444	11	–	12	.478
Arizona State	6	–	9	.400	11	–	12	.478
Utah	4	–	15	.211	5	–	16	.238
Washington	3	–	13	.188	7	–	14	.333
California	1	–	12	.077	1	–	16	.059
† 2021 Pac-12 Tournament winner As of March 29, 2021; Rankings from AP poll

The 2020–21 Washington Huskies women's basketball team represented University of Washington during the 2020–21 NCAA Division I women's basketball season. The Huskies, led by fourth-year head coach Jody Wynn, played their home games at Alaska Airlines Arena at Hec Edmundson Pavilion in Seattle, Washington as members of the Pac-12 Conference. On March 15, 2021, following a season with a 7–13 (3–13 Pac-12) record, Wynn was fired as head coach.

== Roster ==
2020–21 Washington Huskies women's basketball team
Players
Coaches

Pos.	#	Name	Height	Year	Previous school	Hometown
G	0	Quay Miller	5 ft 11 in (1.8 m)	Fr	Kentridge	Renton, WA
C	3	Tameiya Sadler	6 ft 3 in (1.91 m)	So	Mount Spokane	Colbert, WA
G	5	Grace Beasley	5 ft 7 in (1.7 m)	Jr	Caulfield Grammar School	Melbourne, AUS
F	11	Haley Van Dyke	6 ft 1 in (1.85 m)	Jr	Campolindo	Moraga, CA
G	15	Nia Lowery	5 ft 11 in (1.8 m)	RS Fr	C. K. McClatchy	Sacramento, CA
F	20	Khayla Rooks	6 ft 1 in (1.85 m)	Sr	Mission Hills	San Marcos, CA
G	21	Jess Finney	6 ft 0 in (1.83 m)	Fr	Chaparral	Scottsdale, AZ
F	23	Alexis Whitfield	6 ft 2 in (1.88 m)	Fr	Chaminade College Prep	West Hills, CA
G	25	T. T. Watkins	5 ft 11 in (1.8 m)	Jr	Walnut	Walnut, CA
G	35	Alexis Griggsby	5 ft 9 in (1.75 m)	Sr	Sierra Canyon	Northridge, CA
G	40	AJ Martineau	5 ft 6 in (1.68 m)	Fr	Edmonds-Woodway	Brier, WA
G	41	Callie Lind	5 ft 9 in (1.75 m)	So	Eastlake	Sammamish, WA
G	44	Missy Peterson	5 ft 11 in (1.8 m)	Sr	Edmonds-Woodway	Edmonds, WA
F	53	Darcy Rees	6 ft 4 in (1.93 m)	Jr	Adelaide	Adelaide, South Australia

Head coach

- Jody Wynn (USC)

Assistant coach(es)

- Derek Wynn (AHC, Cal State Fullerton)
- Tamara McDonald (Pepperdine)
- Paul Reed (Langston)

Legend

- (C) Team captain
- (S) Suspended
- (I) Ineligible
- (W) Walk-on
- Injured
- Current redshirt

Roster

== Schedule ==
Date time, TV	Rank^{#}	Opponent^{#}	Result	Record	Site (attendance) city, state
Regular season
Nov 25, 2020*; 7:00 pm, FloHoops		vs. San Diego State	W 61–59	1–0	T-Mobile Arena; Paradise, NV
Nov 28, 2020*; 6:30 pm, Live Stream		vs. Brigham Young	W 77–48	2–0	T-Mobile Arena; Paradise, NV
December 4, 2020; 6:00 pm, P12N		at California	W 80–53	3–0 (1–0)	Haas Pavilion; Berkeley, CA
December 6, 2020; 2:00 pm		at No. 2 Stanford	L 50–83	3–1 (1–1)	Maples Pavilion; Stanford, CA
December 11, 2020; 4:00 pm, P12N		Washington State; Apple Cup	L 52–60	3–2 (1–2)	Alaska Airlines Arena; Seattle, WA
December 13, 2020*; 2:00 pm, Live stream		Portland	W 83–56	4–2	Alaska Airlines Arena; Seattle, WA
December 19, 2020; 2:00 pm, P12N		No. 7 Oregon	L 49–73	4–3 (1–3)	Alaska Airlines Arena; Seattle, WA
December 21, 2020; 2:00 pm, P12N		Oregon State	Postponed due to COVID-19 issues with OSU		Alaska Airlines Arena; Seattle, WA
January 1, 2021; 2:00 pm, Live Stream		at Colorado	L 50–60	4–4 (1–4)	CU Events Center; Boulder, CO
January 3, 2021; 1:00 pm, P12N		at Utah	L 63–84	4–5 (1–5)	Jon M. Huntsman Center; Salt Lake City, UT
January 8, 2021; 8:00 pm, P12N		No. 6 Arizona	Postponed due to COVID-19 issues with UW		Alaska Airlines Arena; Seattle, WA
January 10, 2021; 1:00 pm, P12N		Arizona State	Postponed due to COVID-19 issues with UW		Alaska Airlines Arena; Seattle, WA
Jan 15, 2021; 6:30 pm, P12N		at UCLA	Postponed due to COVID-19 issues with UW		Pauley Pavilion; Los Angeles, CA
January 21, 2021; 2:00 pm, Live Stream		at Oregon State	L 68–98	4–6 (1–6)	Gill Coliseum; Corvallis, OR
January 26, 2021; 4:00 pm		at Oregon State	L 68–98	4–7 (1–7)	Gill Coliseum; Corvallis, OR
January 29, 2021; 8:00 pm		California	Postponed due to COVID-19 issues with Cal		Alaska Airlines Arena; Seattle, WA
January 31, 2021; 1:00 pm		Stanford	L 48–74	4–8 (1–8)	Alaska Airlines Arena; Seattle, WA
February 5, 2021; 7:00 pm		USC	L 54–63	4–9 (1–9)	Alaska Airlines Arena; Seattle, WA
February 7, 2021; 2:00 pm		UCLA	L 50–84	4–10 (1–10)	Alaska Airlines Arena; Seattle, WA
February 12, 2021		at Arizona State	W 50–35	5–10 (2–9)	Desert Financial Arena; Tempe, AZ
February 14, 2021		at Arizona	L 53–75	5–11 (2–10)	McKale Center; Tucson, AZ
February 22, 2021; 2:00 pm		Colorado	L 50–55	5–12 (2–11)	Alaska Airlines Arena; Seattle, WA
February 28, 2021; 1:00 pm, P12N		at Washington State	L 52–61	6–13 (3–13)	Beasley Coliseum; Pullman, WA
Pac-12 Women's Tournament
March 3; 8:00 pm, P12N	(11)	vs. (6) Colorado; First Round	W 68–54	7–13	Michelob Ultra Arena (18); Paradise, NV
March 4; 8:00 pm, P12N	(11)	vs. (3) No. 9 UCLA; Quarterfinals	L 46–58	7–14	Michelob Ultra Arena (38); Paradise, NV46
*Non-conference game. ^{#}Rankings from AP Poll. (#) Tournament seedings in parentheses. All times are in Pacific Time.

== See also ==
- 2020–21 Washington Huskies men's basketball team
