= 2020–21 Colorado Buffaloes women's basketball team =

Intercollegiate basketball season

2020–21 Colorado Buffaloes women's basketball

WNIT, Quarterfinals
- Conference: Pac-12 Conference
- Record: 12–11 (8–8 Pac-12)
- Head coach: JR Payne (5th season)
- Assistant coaches: Toriano Towns; Alex Earl; Shandrika Lee
- Home arena: CU Events Center

2020–21 Pac-12 Conference women's basketball standings
	Conf.				Overall
Team	W		L	PCT	W		L	PCT
No. 2 Stanford†	19	–	2	.905	31	–	2	.939
No. 11 Arizona	13	–	4	.765	21	–	6	.778
No. 9 UCLA	12	–	4	.750	17	–	6	.739
No. 23 Oregon	10	–	7	.588	15	–	9	.625
Oregon State	7	–	6	.538	12	–	8	.600
Colorado	8	–	8	.500	12	–	11	.522
Washington State	9	–	10	.474	12	–	12	.500
USC	8	–	10	.444	11	–	12	.478
Arizona State	6	–	9	.400	11	–	12	.478
Utah	4	–	15	.211	5	–	16	.238
Washington	3	–	13	.188	7	–	14	.333
California	1	–	12	.077	1	–	16	.059
† 2021 Pac-12 Tournament winner As of March 29, 2021; Rankings from AP poll

The 2020–21 Colorado Buffaloes women's basketball team represented the University of Colorado Boulder during the 2020–21 NCAA Division I women's basketball season. The Buffaloes, led by fifth-year head coach JR Payne, played their home games at the CU Events Center and were a member of the Pac-12 Conference.

The Buffaloes finished the season 12–11, 8–8 in Pac-12 play to finish in sixth place. In the Pac-12 Tournament, they were upset by eleventh seed Washington in the first round. They received an at-large bid to the WNIT. They defeated Louisiana and Nebraska before losing to Ole Miss in the quarterfinals to end their season.

== Previous season ==
The Buffaloes finished the season 16–14, 5–13 in Pac-12 play to finish in a tie for ninth place. As the tenth seed in the Pac-12 women's tournament they lost to USC in the first round. The NCAA tournament and WNIT were cancelled due to the COVID-19 outbreak.

== Offseason ==
=== Departures ===
Colorado Departures
Name	Num	Pos.	Height	Year	Hometown	Reason for Departure
Quinessa Caylao-Do	0	G	5'9"	Senior	Tacoma, WA	Graduated
Emma Clarke	3	G	6'1"	Sophomore	Perth, Western Australia	Transferred to Texas Tech
Kai Volcy	30	C	6'3"	Sophomore	Bloomfield, NJ	Stepped away from basketball

=== Incoming ===
Colorado incoming transfers
Name	Num	Pos.	Height	Year	Hometown	Previous School
Madison Buford	2	G	5'9"	Sophomore	St. Louis, MO	Rend Lake CC

==== Recruiting ====
College recruiting
Name	Hometown	School	Height	Weight	Commit date
Frida Formann; G	Bagsværd, Denmark	Falkonergårdens Gymnasium	5 ft 11 in (1.80 m)	N/A	Oct 21, 2019
Frida Formann; G	Recruit ratings: No ratings found				
Kylee Blacksten; G	Colorado Springs, CO	Air Academy High School	6 ft 3 in (1.91 m)	N/A	Oct 14, 2019
Kylee Blacksten; G	Recruit ratings: No ratings found				
Allysa Lafontaine; G	Fort Worth, TX	Boswell High School	6 ft 0 in (1.83 m)	N/A	Jul 13, 2019
Allysa Lafontaine; G	Recruit ratings: ESPN: (89)				
Sophie Gerber; G	Scottsdale, AZ	Desert Mountain High School	6 ft 0 in (1.83 m)	N/A	
Sophie Gerber; G	Recruit ratings: No ratings found				
Overall recruit ranking:
Note: In many cases, Scout, Rivals, 247Sports, On3, and ESPN may conflict in their listings of height and weight.; In these cases, the average was taken. ESPN grades are on a 100-point scale.; Sources: "2020 Player Commits". ESPN. Archived from the original on June 26, 2026.

== Roster ==
2020–21 Colorado Buffaloes women's basketball team
Players
Coaches

Pos.	#	Name	Height	Year	Previous school	Hometown
G	00	Jaylyn Sherrod	5 ft 7 in (1.7 m)	So	Rasmay	Birmingham, AL
G	1	Tayanna Jones	6 ft 1 in (1.85 m)	Jr	North Johnston; Rend Lake College	Selma, NC
G	2	Madison Buford	5 ft 9 in (1.75 m)	So	Lutheran North; Georgetown	St. Louis, MO
G	3	Frida Formann	5 ft 11 in (1.8 m)	Fr	Falkonergårdens Gymnasium	Bagsværd, Norway
G	4	Lesila Finau	5 ft 10 in (1.78 m)	Jr	Dublin	Dublin, CA
G	11	Zuzanna Kulinska	5 ft 10 in (1.78 m)	So	New York Military	Gdynia, Poland
G	13	Kylee Blacksten	6 ft 3 in (1.91 m)	Fr	Air Academy	Colorado Springs, CO
G/F	14	Raanee Smith	6 ft 2 in (1.88 m)	So	Friends' Central	Philadelphia, PA
C	20	Maura Singer	6 ft 4 in (1.93 m)	RS Fr	Columbine	Littleton, CO
G/F	21	Mya Hollingshed	6 ft 3 in (1.91 m)	Sr	Bellaire	Houston, TX
G	24	Aubrey Knight	6 ft 0 in (1.83 m)	Jr	Ventura	Ventura, CA
F	25	Annika Jank	6 ft 3 in (1.91 m)	Sr	Edina	Edina, MN
G	32	Allysa LaFontaine	6 ft 0 in (1.83 m)	Fr	Boswell	Fort Worth, TX
F	33	Sirena Tuitele	6 ft 1 in (1.85 m)	Jr	Pleasant Valley	Chico, CA
G	44	Sophie Gerber	6 ft 0 in (1.83 m)	Fr	Desert Mountain	Scottsdale, AZ
F	45	Charlotte Whittaker	6 ft 3 in (1.91 m)	So	St Andrew's College	Ventura, CA

Head coach

- JR Payne (Saint Mary's)

Assistant coach(es)

- Toriano Towns (Saint Mary's)
- Alex Earl (Arizona State)
- Shandrika Lee (Pepperdine)

Legend

- (C) Team captain
- (S) Suspended
- (I) Ineligible
- (W) Walk-on
- Injured
- Current redshirt

Roster
Last update: May 13, 2021

== Schedule ==
Date time, TV	Rank^{#}	Opponent^{#}	Result	Record	Site (attendance) city, state
Regular season
November 25, 2021*; 6:00 p.m.		Western State	W 77–50	1–0	CU Events Center (17); Boulder, CO
November 28, 2020*; 12:00 p.m.		Air Force	W 88–46	2–0	CU Events Center (17); Boulder, CO
December 4, 2020; 3:00 p.m., P12N		at No. 10 Oregon	L 52–82	2–1 (0–1)	Matthew Knight Arena (1); Eugene, OR
December 6, 2020; 6:00 p.m., P12N		at No. 17 Oregon State	L 53–70	2–2 (0–2)	Gill Coliseum (0); Corvallis, OR
December 8, 2020*; 6:00 p.m.		at Denver	L 84–85	2–3	Magness Arena (0); Denver, CO
December 14, 2020; 12:00 p.m., P12N		Utah	W 80–50	3–3 (1–2)	CU Events Center (17); Boulder, CO
December 18, 2020; 5:00 p.m., P12N		No. 6 Arizona	L 59–62	3–4 (1–3)	CU Events Center (0); Boulder, CO
December 20, 2020; 2:00 p.m., P12N		Arizona State	Canceled		CU Events Center; Boulder, CO
January 1, 2021; 3:00 p.m.		Washington	W 60–50	4–4 (2–3)	CU Events Center (0); Boulder, CO
January 3, 2021; 12:00 p.m., P12N		Washington State	L 63–76	4–5 (2–4)	CU Events Center (0); Boulder, CO
January 8, 2021; 5:00 p.m.		at No. 9 UCLA	Canceled		Pauley Pavilion; Los Angeles, CA
January 11, 2021; 1:00 p.m., P12N		at USC	L 52–56	4–6 (2–5)	CU Events Center (0); Boulder, CO
January 15, 2021; 3:00 p.m., P12N		California	W 75–59	5–6 (3–5)	CU Events Center (0); Boulder, CO
January 17, 2021; 12:00 p.m., P12N		No. 1 Stanford	W 77–72 ^{OT}	6–6 (4–5)	CU Events Center (0); Boulder, CO
January 22, 2021; 3:00 p.m.		at Arizona State	L 47–51	6–7 (4–6)	Desert Financial Arena (0); Tempe, AZ
January 24, 2021; 1:00 p.m., P12N		at No. 10 Arizona	Canceled		McKale Center; Tucson, AZ
January 29, 2021; 6:00 p.m.		Oregon State	L 64–72	6–8 (4–7)	CU Events Center (0); Boulder, CO
January 31, 2021; 12:00 p.m., P12N		No. 11 Oregon	Canceled		CU Events Center; Boulder, CO
February 5, 2021; 7:00 p.m., P12N		at No. 6 Stanford	L 54–62	6–9 (4–8)	Maples Pavilion (1); Stanford, CA
February 7, 2021; 2:00 p.m.		at California	W 67–52	7–9 (5–8)	Haas Pavilion (0); Berkeley, CA
February 12, 2021; 6:00 p.m.		USC	W 66–56	8–9 (6–8)	CU Events Center; Boulder, CO
February 14, 2021; 1:00 p.m.		No. 8 UCLA	Canceled		CU Events Center; Boulder, CO
February 19, 2021; 1:00 p.m.		at Washington State	W 60–57	9–9 (7–8)	Beasley Coliseum (200); Pullman, WA
February 21, 2021; 3:00 p.m.		at Washington	W 55–50	10–9 (8–8)	Alaska Airlines Arena (0); Seattle, WA
February 28, 2021; 12:00 p.m., P12N		at Utah	Canceled		Jon M. Huntsman Center; Salt Lake City, UT
Pac-12 Women's Tournament
March 3, 2021*; 9:00 p.m., P12N	(6)	vs. (11) Washington; First Round	L 54–68	10–10	Michelob Ultra Arena (18); Paradise, NV
WNIT
March 19, 2021*; 1:00 p.m., FloHoops		Louisiana; First Round	W 68–45	11–10	My Town Movers Fieldhouse (300); Collierville, Tennessee
March 20, 2021*; 4 p.m., FloHoops		Nebraska; Second Round	W 75–71	12–10	My Town Movers Fieldhouse (300); Collierville, Tennessee
March 22, 2021*; 6:00 p.m., FloHoops		Ole Miss; Quarterfinals	L 56–65	12–11	My Town Movers Fieldhouse (300); Collierville, Tennessee
*Non-conference game. ^{#}Rankings from AP Poll. (#) Tournament seedings in parentheses. All times are in Mountain Time.

== Rankings ==
2020–21 NCAA Division I women's basketball rankings

Regular season polls
Poll	Pre- season	Week 2	Week 3	Week 4	Week 5	Week 6	Week 7	Week 8	Week 9	Week 10	Week 11	Week 12	Week 13	Week 14	Week 15	Week 16	Final
AP																	
Coaches								RV									

Legend
	Increase in ranking
	Decrease in ranking
	Not Ranked in Previous Week
(RV)	Received Votes
(NR)	Not Ranked

Note: The Coaches Poll does not release a Week 2 poll, and the AP poll does not release a poll after the NCAA Tournament.

== See also ==
2020–21 Colorado Buffaloes men's basketball team
