= 2020–21 Oregon Ducks women's basketball team =

Intercollegiate basketball season

2020–21 Oregon Ducks women's basketball

NCAA tournament, Sweet Sixteen
- Conference: Pac-12 Conference

Ranking
- Coaches: No. 22
- AP: No. 23
- Record: 15–9 (10–7 Pac-12)
- Head coach: Kelly Graves (7th season)
- Assistant coaches: Mark Campbell; Jodie Berry; Xavier López
- Home arena: Matthew Knight Arena

2020–21 Pac-12 Conference women's basketball standings
	Conf.				Overall
Team	W		L	PCT	W		L	PCT
No. 2 Stanford†	19	–	2	.905	31	–	2	.939
No. 11 Arizona	13	–	4	.765	21	–	6	.778
No. 9 UCLA	12	–	4	.750	17	–	6	.739
No. 23 Oregon	10	–	7	.588	15	–	9	.625
Oregon State	7	–	6	.538	12	–	8	.600
Colorado	8	–	8	.500	12	–	11	.522
Washington State	9	–	10	.474	12	–	12	.500
USC	8	–	10	.444	11	–	12	.478
Arizona State	6	–	9	.400	11	–	12	.478
Utah	4	–	15	.211	5	–	16	.238
Washington	3	–	13	.188	7	–	14	.333
California	1	–	12	.077	1	–	16	.059
† 2021 Pac-12 Tournament winner As of March 29, 2021; Rankings from AP poll

The 2020–21 Oregon Ducks women's basketball team represented the University of Oregon during the 2020–21 NCAA Division I women's basketball season. The Ducks, led by seventh-year head coach Kelly Graves, played home games at the Matthew Knight Arena as members of the Pac-12 Conference.

== Previous season ==
The Ducks finished the season 31–2, 17–1 in Pac-12 play to finish in first place. They won the Pac-12 women's tournament, defeating Utah, Arizona, and Stanford along the way to their title. The NCAA tournament and WNIT were cancelled due to the COVID-19 outbreak. Oregon finished ranked second in both the AP and Coaches poll.

== Offseason ==
=== Departures ===
Name	Number	Pos.	Height	Year	Hometown	Reason left
Satou Sabally	0	Forward	6'4"	Junior	Berlin, Germany	Graduated early; declared for WNBA draft
Holly Winterburn	11	Guard	5'10"	Freshman	Northampton, England	Transferred to UC Davis
Lucy Cochrane	12	Forward	6'5"	Freshman	Melbourne, Australia	Transferred to Portland
Sabrina Ionescu	20	Guard	5'11"	Senior	Walnut Creek, CA	Graduated
Minyon Moore	23	Guard	5'8"	Senior	Hercules, CA	Graduated
Ruthy Hebard	24	Forward	6'4"	Senior	Fairbanks, AK	Graduated

=== Incoming transfers ===
Name	Number	Pos.	Height	Year	Hometown	Date eligible	Years eligible	Previous school
Taylor Mikesell	3	Guard	5'11"	Junior	Massillon, OH	October 1, 2020	3 (Note: Both Mikesell and Wilson initially had two years of eligibility, but the NCAA ruled that the 2020–21 season would not be counted against the eligibility of any student-athlete in a winter sport, including women's basketball.)	Maryland
Arielle Wilson	10	Forward	6'6"	Junior	Fayetteville, NC	October 1, 2020	3	Kilgore College

=== Recruiting class of 2020 ===
College recruiting information
Name	Hometown	School	Height	Weight	Commit date
Sydney Parrish; G	Fishers, IN	Hamilton Southeastern	6 ft 0 in (1.83 m)	N/A	Nov 13, 2019
Sydney Parrish; G	Recruit ratings: ESPN: (98)				
Kylee Watson; F	Linwood, NJ	Mainland	6 ft 3 in (1.91 m)	N/A	Nov 13, 2019
Kylee Watson; F	Recruit ratings: ESPN: (98)				
Maddie Scherr; G	Florence, KY	Ryle	5 ft 11 in (1.80 m)	N/A	Nov 18, 2019
Maddie Scherr; G	Recruit ratings: ESPN: (98)				
Angela Dugalic; F	Des Plaines, IL	Maine West	6 ft 4 in (1.93 m)	N/A	Nov 13, 2019
Angela Dugalic; F	Recruit ratings: ESPN: (97)				
Te-Hina Paopao; G	San Diego, CA	La Jolla Country Day	5 ft 9 in (1.75 m)	N/A	Nov 13, 2019
Te-Hina Paopao; G	Recruit ratings: ESPN: (97)				
Overall recruit ranking: ESPN: 1
Note: In many cases, Scout, Rivals, 247Sports, On3, and ESPN may conflict in their listings of height and weight.; In these cases, the average was taken. ESPN grades are on a 100-point scale.; Sources: "2020 Team Ranking". Rivals.

== Roster ==
2020–21 Oregon Ducks women's basketball team
Players
Coaches

Pos.	#	Name	Height	Year	Previous school	Hometown
F	1	Nyara Sabally	6 ft 5 in (1.96 m)	RS So	Rotteck Gymnasium	Berlin, Germany
G	3	Taylor Chavez	5 ft 10 in (1.78 m)	Jr	Valley Vista	Surprise, AZ
G	4	Jaz Shelley	5 ft 9 in (1.75 m)	So	Berwick College	Moe, VIC, Australia
F	10	Arielle Wilison	6 ft 6 in (1.98 m)	Jr	Northwood Temple Academy; Kilgore College	Fayetteville, NC
G	11	Taylor Mikesell	5 ft 11 in (1.8 m)	Jr	Jackson; Maryland	Massillon, OH
F	12	Te-Hina Paopao	5 ft 9 in (1.75 m)	Fr	La Jolla Country Day	Oceanside, CA
F	14	Lydia Giomi	6 ft 6 in (1.98 m)	Sr	West Seattle HS	Seattle, WA
F	21	Erin Boley	6 ft 2 in (1.88 m)	Sr	Elizabethtown HS; Notre Dame	Hodgenville, KY
F	22	Kylee Watson	6 ft 4 in (1.93 m)	Fr	Mainland	Linwood, NJ
G	23	Maddie Scherr	5 ft 11 in (1.8 m)	Fr	Ryle	Florence, KY
F	25	Angela Dugalic	6 ft 4 in (1.93 m)	Fr	Maine West	Des Plaines, IL
F	32	Sedona Prince	6 ft 7 in (2.01 m)	RS So	Liberty Hill HS; Texas	Liberty Hill, TX
G	33	Sydney Parrish	6 ft 2 in (1.88 m)	Fr	Hamilton Southeastern	Fishers, IN

Head coach

- Kelly Graves (New Mexico)

Assistant coach(es)

- Mark Campbell (Hawaiʻi)
- Jodie Berry (Western Washington)
- Xavier López (Point Loma)

Legend

- (C) Team captain
- (S) Suspended
- (I) Ineligible
- (W) Walk-on
- Injured
- Current redshirt

Roster
Last update: March 18, 2021

== Schedule ==
Date time, TV	Rank^{#}	Opponent^{#}	Result	Record	Site (attendance) city, state
Regular Season
November 28, 2020*; 1:00 p.m.	No. 10	Seattle	W 116–51	1–0	Matthew Knight Arena (0); Eugene, OR
November 30, 2020*; 8:00 p.m., NBCSNW	No. 10	at Portland	W 85–52	2–0	Chiles Center (0); Portland, OR
December 4, 2020; 2:00 p.m., P12N	No. 10	Colorado	W 82–52	3–0 (1–0)	Matthew Knight Arena (1); Eugene, OR
December 6, 2020; 11:00 a.m., P12N	No. 10	Utah	W 85–43	4–0 (2–0)	Matthew Knight Arena (0); Eugene, OR
December 8, 2020; TBA, P12N	No. 8	Portland State	Postponed		Matthew Knight Arena; Eugene, OR
December 13, 2020; 4:00 p.m., P12N	No. 8	at No. 15 Oregon State; Civil War	W 79–59	5–0 (3–0)	Gill Coliseum (0); Corvallis, OR
December 19, 2020; 2:00 p.m., P12N	No. 7	at Washington	W 73–49	6–0 (4–0)	Alaska Airlines Arena (0); Seattle, WA
December 21, 2020; 11:00 a.m., P12N	No. 8	at Washington State	W 69–65	7–0 (5–0)	Beasley Coliseum (0); Pullman, WA
January 1, 2021; 6:00 p.m., P12N	No. 8	USC	W 92–69	8–0 (6–0)	Matthew Knight Arena (0); Eugene, OR
January 3, 2021; 1:00 p.m., P12N	No. 8	No. 11 UCLA	L 71–73	8–1 (6–1)	Matthew Knight Arena (0); Eugene, OR
January 8, 2021; 11:30 a.m., P12N	No. 11	at No. 1 Stanford	L 63–70	8–2 (6–2)	Maples Pavilion (1); Stanford, CA
January 10, 2021; 1:00 p.m., P12N	No. 11	at California	W 100–41	9–2 (7–2)	Haas Pavilion (0); Berkeley, CA
January 14, 2021; 4:00 p.m., ESPN	No. 10	at No. 11 Arizona	L 41–57	9–3 (7–3)	McKale Center (0); Tucson, AZ
January 17, 2021; 11:00 a.m., P12N	No. 10	at Arizona State	Postponed		Desert Financial Arena; Tempe, AZ
January 22, 2021; 5:00 p.m., P12N	No. 13	Washington State	W 58–50	10–3 (8–3)	Matthew Knight Arena (0); Eugene, OR
January 24, 2021; 2:00 p.m., P12N	No. 13	Washington	W 69–52	11–3 (9–3)	Matthew Knight Arena (0); Eugene, OR
January 29, 2021; 2:00 p.m., P12N	No. 11	at Utah	Postponed		Jon M. Huntsman Center; Salt Lake City, UT
January 31, 2021; 11:00 a.m., P12N	No. 11	at Colorado	Postponed		CU Events Center; Boulder, CO
February 5, 2021; 8:00 p.m., P12N	No. 12	Arizona State	Postponed		Matthew Knight Arena; Eugene, OR
February 6, 2021*; 6:00 p.m.	No. 12	UC Davis	W 63–57	12–3	Matthew Knight Arena (0); Eugene, OR
February 8, 2021; 4:00 p.m., ESPN2	No. 11	No. 10 Arizona	L 59–79	12–4 (9–4)	Matthew Knight Arena (0); Eugene, OR
February 12, 2021; 4:00 p.m., P12N	No. 11	California	Postponed		Matthew Knight Arena; Eugene, OR
February 15, 2021; 6:00 p.m., ESPN	No. 13	No. 6 Stanford	L 61–63	12–5 (9–5)	Matthew Knight Arena (0); Eugene, OR
February 19, 2021; 5:00 p.m., P12N	No. 13	at No. 8 UCLA	L 56–83	12–6 (9–6)	Pauley Pavilion (0); Los Angeles, CA
February 21, 2021; Noon, P12N	No. 13	at USC	W 72–48	13–6 (10–6)	Galen Center (0); Los Angeles, CA
February 28, 2021; 3:00 p.m., P12N	No. 14	Oregon State; Civil War	L 77–88	13–7 (10–7)	Matthew Knight Arena (0); Eugene, OR
Pac-12 Women's Tournament
March 4, 2021; 11:00 a.m., P12N	(4) No. 19	vs. (5) Oregon State; Quarterfinals/Civil War	L 64–71	13–8	Michelob Ultra Arena (0); Paradise, NV
NCAA Women's Tournament
March 22, 2021*; 7:00 pm, ESPN2	(5 A) No. 23	vs. (11 A) South Dakota; First Round	W 67–47	14–8	Alamodome; San Antonio, TX
March 24, 2021*; Noon, ESPN2	(5 A) No. 23	vs. (3 A) No. 10 Georgia; Second Round	W 57–50	15–8	Alamodome; San Antonio, TX
March 28, 2021*; 4:00 pm, ESPN	(5 A) No. 23	vs. (2 A) No. 8 Louisville; Sweet Sixteen	L 42–60	15–9	Alamodome; San Antonio, TX
*Non-conference game. ^{#}Rankings from AP Poll. (#) Tournament seedings in parentheses. A=Alamo. All times are in Pacific Time.

== Rankings ==
Ranking movement Legend: ██ Increase in ranking. ██ Decrease in ranking. NR = Not ranked. RV = Received votes.
Poll	Pre	Wk 2	Wk 3	Wk 4	Wk 5	Wk 6	Wk 7	Wk 8	Wk 9	Wk 10	Wk 11	Wk 12	Wk 13	Wk 14	Wk 15	Wk 16	Final
AP	10	10	8	7-T	8	8	11	10	13	11	12	11	13	14	19	23	23
Coaches	9	8 (1)	8 (1)	7-T	7	11	10	13	12	11	13	13-T	15	18	22	22	

^Coaches did not release a Week 2 poll. The AP Poll does not release a poll after the NCAA Tournament.

== See also ==
- 2020–21 Oregon Ducks men's basketball team
