= 2020–21 Utah Utes women's basketball team =

Intercollegiate basketball season

2020–21 Utah Utes women's basketball
- Conference: Pac-12 Conference
- Record: 5–16 (4–15 Pac–12)
- Head coach: Lynne Roberts (6th season)
- Associate head coach: Gavin Petersen
- Assistant coaches: Danyelle Snelgro; Joanna Reitz
- Home arena: Jon M. Huntsman Center

2020–21 Pac-12 Conference women's basketball standings
	Conf.				Overall
Team	W		L	PCT	W		L	PCT
No. 2 Stanford†	19	–	2	.905	31	–	2	.939
No. 11 Arizona	13	–	4	.765	21	–	6	.778
No. 9 UCLA	12	–	4	.750	17	–	6	.739
No. 23 Oregon	10	–	7	.588	15	–	9	.625
Oregon State	7	–	6	.538	12	–	8	.600
Colorado	8	–	8	.500	12	–	11	.522
Washington State	9	–	10	.474	12	–	12	.500
USC	8	–	10	.444	11	–	12	.478
Arizona State	6	–	9	.400	11	–	12	.478
Utah	4	–	15	.211	5	–	16	.238
Washington	3	–	13	.188	7	–	14	.333
California	1	–	12	.077	1	–	16	.059
† 2021 Pac-12 Tournament winner As of March 29, 2021; Rankings from AP poll

The 2020–21 Utah Utes women's basketball team represented the University of Utah during the 2020–21 NCAA Division I women's basketball season. The Utes, led by sixth-year head coach Lynne Roberts, played their home games at the Jon M. Huntsman Center and were members of the Pac-12 Conference.

== Previous season ==
The Utes finished the season 14–17, 6–12 in Pac-12 play to finish in eighth place. They advanced to the quarterfinals of the Pac-12 women's tournament, where they lost to Oregon. The NCAA tournament and WNIT were cancelled due to the COVID-19 pandemic.

== Roster ==
2020–21 Utah Utes women's basketball team
Players
Coaches

Pos.	#	Name	Height	Year	Previous school	Hometown
G	0	Donna Ntambue	5 ft 9 in (1.75 m)	Fr	Niagara Prep	Montreal, QC
G	1	Isabel Palmer	5 ft 9 in (1.75 m)	Fr	BA Centre of Excellence	Newcastle, Australia
F	3	Andreas Torres	6 ft 2 in (1.88 m)	Jr	Montmorency (CEGEP)	Montreal, QC
F	5	Zuzanna Puc	6 ft 2 in (1.88 m)	RS Sr	ZSMS Poznan; UTEP	Poznań, Poland
G	10	Dru Gylten	5 ft 11 in (1.8 m)	Jr	St. Thomas More HS	Rapid City, SD
G	11	Brynna Maxwell	6 ft 0 in (1.83 m)	So	Gig Harbor HS	Gig Harbor, WA
F	12	Lola Pendande	6 ft 3 in (1.91 m)	So	Ribet Academy	Roquetas de Mar, Spain
G/F	14	Niyah Becker	6 ft 2 in (1.88 m)	Jr	Lincoln Prep	Winnipeg, MB
G	15	Kemery Martin	6 ft 0 in (1.83 m)	So	Corner Canyon HS	Sandy, UT
F	21	Maurane Corbin	6 ft 5 in (1.96 m)	Jr	Montmorency (CEGEP)	Saint-Bruno-de-Montarville, QC
G	24	Kennady McQueen	5 ft 10 in (1.78 m)	Fr	North Summit High School	Henefer, UT
F	35	Ola Makurat	6 ft 3 in (1.91 m)	Sr	Sport Championship School; Liberty	Sierakowice, Poland
F	42	Peyton McFarland	6 ft 4 in (1.93 m)	Fr	Boise HS	Boise, ID
F	53	Kelsey Rees	6 ft 5 in (1.96 m)	Fr	BA Centre of Excellence	Glenelg, Australia

Head coach

- Lynne Roberts (Seattle Pacific)

Assistant coach(es)

- Gavin Petersen (Hawaiʻi)
- Danyelle Grant (Utah State)
- Joanna Reitz (Covenant)

Legend

- (C) Team captain
- (S) Suspended
- (I) Ineligible
- (W) Walk-on
- Injured
- Current redshirt

Roster
Last update: May 24, 2021

== Schedule and results ==
Date time, TV	Rank^{#}	Opponent^{#}	Result	Record	Site (attendance) city, state
Regular season
December 6, 2020; Noon, P12N		at No. 10 Oregon	L 43–85	0–1 (0–1)	Matthew Knight Arena (0); Eugene, OR
December 8, 2020; 7:00 p.m.		at No. 15 Oregon State	W 85–79	1–1 (1–1)	Gill Coliseum (0); Corvallis, OR
December 11, 2020*; 5:00 p.m.		Montana State	W 73–63	2–1	Jon M. Huntsman Center (0); Salt Lake City, UT
December 14, 2020; Noon, P12N		at Colorado	L 50–80	2–2 (1–2)	CU Events Center (17); Boulder, CO
December 18, 2020; 3:00 p.m., P12N		Arizona State	L 48–56	2–3 (1–3)	Jon M. Huntsman Center (0); Salt Lake City, UT
December 20, 2020; Noon, P12N		No. 6 Arizona	L 60–77	2–4 (1–4)	Jon M. Huntsman Center (0); Salt Lake City, UT
January 1, 2021; Noon		Washington State	L 74–79	2–5 (1–5)	Jon M. Huntsman Center; Salt Lake City, UT
January 3, 2021; 2:00 p.m., P12N		Washington	W 84–63	3–5 (2–5)	Jon M. Huntsman Center (0); Salt Lake City, UT
January 8, 2021; 7:00 p.m., P12N		at USC	L 59–60	3–6 (2–6)	Galen Center (0); Los Angeles, CA
January 10, 2021; 2:00 p.m., P12N		at No. 9 UCLA	L 67–92	3–7 (2–7)	Pauley Pavilion (0); Los Angeles, CA
January 15, 2021; 1:30 p.m., P12N		No. 1 Stanford	L 54–82	3–8 (2–8)	Jon M. Huntsman Center (0); Salt Lake City, UT
January 17, 2021; Noon, P12N		California	Canceled		Jon M. Huntsman Center; Salt Lake City, UT
January 22, 2021; 4:00 p.m., P12N		at No. 10 Arizona	L 54–66	3–9 (2–9)	McKale Center (0); Tucson, AZ
January 24, 2021; 2:00 p.m.		at Arizona State	W 65–51	4–9 (3–9)	Desert Financial Arena (0); Tempe, AZ
January 29, 2021; 3:00 p.m., P12N		No. 11 Oregon	Canceled		Jon M. Huntsman Center; Salt Lake City, UT
January 31, 2021; Noon		Oregon State	L 74–84	4–10 (3–10)	Jon M. Huntsman Center (0); Salt Lake City, UT
February 5, 2021; 7:00 p.m.		at California	W 62–51	5–10 (4–10)	Haas Pavilion (0); Berkeley, CA
February 7, 2021; 2:00 p.m., P12N		at No. 6 Stanford	L 41–83	5–11 (4–11)	Maples Pavilion (1); Stanford, CA
February 12, 2021; 11:00 a.m.		No. 8 UCLA	L 58–69	5–12 (4–12)	Jon M. Huntsman Center (0); Salt Lake City, UT
February 14, 2021; 4:00 p.m.		USC	L 49–66	5–13 (4–13)	Jon M. Huntsman Center (0); Salt Lake City, UT
February 19, 2021; 8:00 p.m.		at Washington	L 61–78	5–14 (4–14)	Hec Edmundson Pavilion (0); Seattle, WA
February 21, 2021; 1:00 p.m.		at Washington State	L 55–68	5–15 (4–15)	Beasley Coliseum (0); Pullman, WA
February 28, 2021; Noon, P12N		Colorado	Canceled		Jon M. Huntsman Center; Salt Lake City, UT
Pac-12 Women's Tournament
March 3, 2021; 5:00 p.m., P12N	(10)	vs. (7) Washington State; First Round	L 48–57	5–16	Michelob Ultra Arena (18); Paradise, NV
*Non-conference game. ^{#}Rankings from AP Poll. (#) Tournament seedings in parentheses. All times are in Mountain Time.

== Rankings ==
Regular season polls
Poll	Pre- season	Week 2	Week 3	Week 4	Week 5	Week 6	Week 7	Week 8	Week 9	Week 10	Week 11	Week 12	Week 13	Week 14	Week 15	Week 16	Final
AP																	
Coaches																	

Legend
	Increase in ranking
	Decrease in ranking
	No change
(RV)	Received votes
(NR)	Not ranked

Coaches did not release a Week 2 poll, and AP does not release a poll after the NCAA Tournament.

== See also ==
- 2020–21 Utah Utes men's basketball team
