= 2020–21 UCLA Bruins women's basketball team =

Intercollegiate basketball season

2020–21 UCLA Bruins women's basketball

NCAA tournament, second round
- Conference: Pac-12 Conference

Ranking
- Coaches: No. 12
- AP: No. 9
- Record: 17–6 (12–4 Pac-12)
- Head coach: Cori Close (10th season)
- Associate head coach: Shannon Perry-LeBeauf
- Assistant coaches: Tasha Brown; Tony Newnan
- Home arena: Pauley Pavilion

2020–21 Pac-12 Conference women's basketball standings
	Conf.				Overall
Team	W		L	PCT	W		L	PCT
No. 2 Stanford†	19	–	2	.905	31	–	2	.939
No. 11 Arizona	13	–	4	.765	21	–	6	.778
No. 9 UCLA	12	–	4	.750	17	–	6	.739
No. 23 Oregon	10	–	7	.588	15	–	9	.625
Oregon State	7	–	6	.538	12	–	8	.600
Colorado	8	–	8	.500	12	–	11	.522
Washington State	9	–	10	.474	12	–	12	.500
USC	8	–	10	.444	11	–	12	.478
Arizona State	6	–	9	.400	11	–	12	.478
Utah	4	–	15	.211	5	–	16	.238
Washington	3	–	13	.188	7	–	14	.333
California	1	–	12	.077	1	–	16	.059
† 2021 Pac-12 Tournament winner As of March 29, 2021; Rankings from AP poll

The 2020–21 UCLA Bruins women's basketball team represented the University of California, Los Angeles during the 2020–21 NCAA Division I women's basketball season. The Bruins, led by tenth year head coach Cori Close, played their home games at Pauley Pavilion and competed as members of the Pac-12 Conference.

== Previous season ==
The Bruins finished the season 26–5, 14–4 in Pac-12 play to finish in a tie for second place. As the second seed in the Pac-12 women's tournament they advanced to the semifinals where they lost to Stanford. The NCAA tournament and WNIT were cancelled due to the COVID-19 outbreak.

== Offseason ==
=== Departures ===
Name	Pos.	Height	Year	Hometown	Reason for departure
Ally Rosenblum	F	6'4"	Sr.	Newport Coast, California	Graduated
Japreece Dean	G	5'6"	Sr.	Austin, Texas	Graduated; selected 30th overall by the Chicago Sky in the 2020 WNBA draft
Jaden Owens	G	5'6"	Fr.	Plano, Texas	Transferred to Baylor

=== 2020 recruiting class ===
College recruiting information
Name	Hometown	School	Height	Weight	Commit date
Emily Bessoir; F	Munich, Germany	Wilhelm-Hausenstein Gymnasium	6 ft 4 in (1.93 m)	N/A	
Emily Bessoir; F	Recruit ratings: ESPN: (N/A)				
Isobel Anstey; P	Melbourne, Australia	Caulfield	6 ft 3 in (1.91 m)	N/A	
Isobel Anstey; P	Recruit ratings: ESPN: (90)				
Overall recruit ranking:
Note: In many cases, Scout, Rivals, 247Sports, On3, and ESPN may conflict in their listings of height and weight.; In these cases, the average was taken. ESPN grades are on a 100-point scale.; Sources:

== Roster ==
2020–21 UCLA Bruins women's basketball team
Players
Coaches

Pos.	#	Name	Height	Year	Previous school	Hometown
G	0	Chantel Horvat	6 ft 1 in (1.85 m)	RS Jr	Geelong College	Geelong, Australia
G	1	Kayla Owens	6 ft 1 in (1.85 m)	RS Jr	Langham Creek	Houston, TX
G	2	Dominique Darius	5 ft 9 in (1.75 m)	Fr	Blair Academy	Jacksonville, FL
G	3	Kiara Jefferson	5 ft 9 in (1.75 m)	Jr	West Campus	Sacramento, CA
G	4	Lindsey Corsaro	6 ft 1 in (1.85 m)	RS Jr	Roncalli	Indianapolis, IN
F	5	Brynn Masikewich	6 ft 3 in (1.91 m)	So	Lincoln Prep	Calgary, Alberta
F	11	Emily Bessoir	6 ft 4 in (1.93 m)	Fr	Wilhelm-Hausenstein Gymnasium	Munich, Germany
G	20	Charisma Osborne	5 ft 9 in (1.75 m)	So	Windward School	Moreno Valley, CA
F	21	Michaela Onyenwere	6 ft 0 in (1.83 m)	Sr	Grandview	Aurora, CO
G	23	Natalie Chou	6 ft 1 in (1.85 m)	RS Sr	Plano West; Baylor	Plano, TX
F	33	Lauryn Miller	6 ft 1 in (1.85 m)	Sr	Kirkwood	Kirkwood, MO
G	35	Camryn Brown	5 ft 11 in (1.8 m)	So	Prestonwood Christian	Lewisville, TX
F	43	Izzy Anstey	6 ft 4 in (1.93 m)	Fr	Caulfield	Melbourne, Australia
G	51	Eliana Sigal (W)	5 ft 10 in (1.78 m)	Jr	Tarbut V' Torah	Irvine, CA

Head coach

- Cori Close (UC Santa Barbara)

Assistant coach(es)

- Shannon Perry-LeBeauf (Iowa)
- Tony Newnan (UC Santa Barbara)
- Tasha Brown (St. Ambrose)

Legend

- (C) Team captain
- (S) Suspended
- (I) Ineligible
- (W) Walk-on
- Injured
- Current redshirt

Roster

- Kayla Owens and Kiara Jefferson declined to participate in the 2020-21 season due to the COVID-19 pandemic.
- Brynn Masikewich chose to remain home in Canada for the 2020-21 season to rehab from an injury.
- Izzy Anstey and Gemma Potter, both from Australia, were not allowed to enter the United States for the 2020-21 academic year due to immigration restrictions related to the COVID-19 pandemic. Potter later elected to play professionally in Australia.
- December 28, 2020: Class of 2021 high school recruit Dominque Darius graduated early so she could enroll at UCLA and participate in the 2020-21 season.

== Schedule ==
Date time, TV	Rank^{#}	Opponent^{#}	Result	Record	Site (attendance) city, state
Regular season
November 27, 2020*; 4:00 p.m.	No. 9	Cal State Fullerton	W 98–49	1–0	Pauley Pavilion (0); Los Angeles, CA
November 29, 2020*; 4:00 p.m., WCCN	No. 9	at Pepperdine	Canceled		Firestone Fieldhouse; Malibu, CA
December 4, 2020; 6:00 p.m., P12N	No. 9	at No. 7 Arizona	L 65–68	1–1 (0–1)	McKale Center (0); Tucson, AZ
December 6, 2020; 1:00 p.m., P12N	No. 9	at Arizona State	W 63–59	2–1 (1–1)	Desert Financial Arena (0); Tempe, AZ
December 9, 2020*; 11:00 a.m.	No. 11	UC Santa Barbara	W 102–45	3–1	Pauley Pavilion (0); Los Angeles, CA
December 13, 2020; Noon, P12N	No. 11	at USC; Rivalry	W 73–52	4–1 (2–1)	Galen Center (0); Los Angeles, CA
December 19, 2020; Noon, P12N	No. 11	California	W 71–37	5–1 (3–1)	Pauley Pavilion (0); Los Angeles, CA
December 21, 2020; Noon, P12N	No. 10	No. 1 Stanford	L 49–61	5–2 (3–2)	Pauley Pavilion (0); Los Angeles, CA
January 1, 2021; TBD, P12N	No. 11	at Oregon State	Canceled		Gill Coliseum; Corvallis, OR
January 3, 2021; 1:00 p.m., P12N	No. 11	at No. 8 Oregon	W 73–71	6–2 (4–2)	Matthew Knight Arena (0); Eugene, OR
January 8, 2021; 4:00 p.m., P12N	No. 9	Colorado	Canceled		Pauley Pavilion; Los Angeles, CA
January 10, 2021; 1:00 p.m., P12N	No. 9	Utah	W 92–67	7–2 (5–2)	Pauley Pavilion (0); Los Angeles, CA
January 15, 2021; 6:30 p.m., P12N	No. 8	Washington	Canceled		Pauley Pavilion; Los Angeles, CA
January 17, 2021; 11:00 a.m., P12N	No. 8	Washington State	W 68–66 ^{OT}	8–2 (6–2)	Pauley Pavilion (0); Los Angeles, CA
January 22, 2021; 7:00 p.m., P12N	No. 6	at No. 5 Stanford	W 70–66	9–2 (7–2)	Maples Pavilion (1); Stanford, CA
January 24, 2021; 3:00 p.m.	No. 6	at California	Canceled		Haas Pavilion; Berkeley, CA
January 29, 2021; 6:00 p.m., P12N	No. 5	Arizona State	W 60–57	10–2 (8–2)	Pauley Pavilion (0); Los Angeles, CA
January 31, 2021; 3:00 p.m., P12N	No. 5	No. 10 Arizona	Canceled		Pauley Pavilion; Los Angeles, CA
February 5, 2021; Noon	No. 5	at Washington State	L 63–67	10–3 (8–3)	Beasley Coliseum (0); Pullman, WA
February 7, 2021; 2:00 p.m.	No. 5	at Washington	W 84–50	11–3 (9–3)	Alaska Airlines Arena (0); Seattle, WA
February 12, 2021; 10:00 p.m.	No. 8	at Utah	W 69–58	12–3 (10–3)	Jon M. Huntsman Center (0); Salt Lake City, UT
February 14, 2021; Noon	No. 8	at Colorado	Canceled		CU Events Center; Boulder, CO
February 19, 2021; 5:00 p.m., P12N	No. 8	No. 13 Oregon	W 83–56	13–3 (11–3)	Pauley Pavilion (0); Los Angeles, CA
February 21, 2021; 1:00 p.m., ESPN2	No. 8	Oregon State	L 64–71	13–4 (11–4)	Pauley Pavilion (0); Los Angeles, CA
February 26, 2021; 5:00 p.m.	No. 10	USC; Rivalry	W 93–51	14–4 (12–4)	Pauley Pavilion (0); Los Angeles, CA
Pac-12 Women's Tournament
March 4, 2021; 8:00 p.m., P12N	(3) No. 9	vs. (11) Washington; Quarterfinals	W 58–46	15–4	Michelob Ultra Arena (38); Paradise, NV
March 5, 2021; 8:00 p.m., P12N	(3) No. 9	vs. (2) No. 11 Arizona; Semifinals	W 58–49	16–4	Michelob Ultra Arena (0); Paradise, NV
March 7, 2021; 5:00 p.m, ESPN2	(3) No. 9	vs. (1) No. 4 Stanford; Finals	L 55–75	16–5	Michelob Ultra Arena (0); Paradise, NV
NCAA tournament
March 22, 2021; 7:00 p.m., ESPN	(3 H) No. 9	vs. (14 H) Wyoming; First Round	W 69–48	17–5	Frank Erwin Center; Austin, TX
March 24, 2021; 6:00 p.m., ESPN2	(3 H) No. 9	vs. (6 H) Texas; Second Round	L 62–71	17–6	Alamodome; San Antonio, TX
*Non-conference game. ^{#}Rankings from AP Poll. (#) Tournament seedings in parentheses. H=HemisFair. All times are in Pacific Time.

== Rankings ==
Ranking movement Legend: ██ Increase in ranking. ██ Decrease in ranking. NR = Not ranked. RV = Received votes.
Poll	Pre	Wk 2	Wk 3	Wk 4	Wk 5	Wk 6	Wk 7	Wk 8	Wk 9	Wk 10	Wk 11	Wk 12	Wk 13	Wk 14	Wk 15	Wk 16	Final
AP	9	9	11	11	10	11	9	8	6	5	5	8	8	10	9	10	9
Coaches	10	11	11	11	12	9	8	6	5	4	7	9	10	9	10	9	

== See also ==
2020–21 UCLA Bruins men's basketball team
