= Charli Turner Thorne =

American basketball player-coach

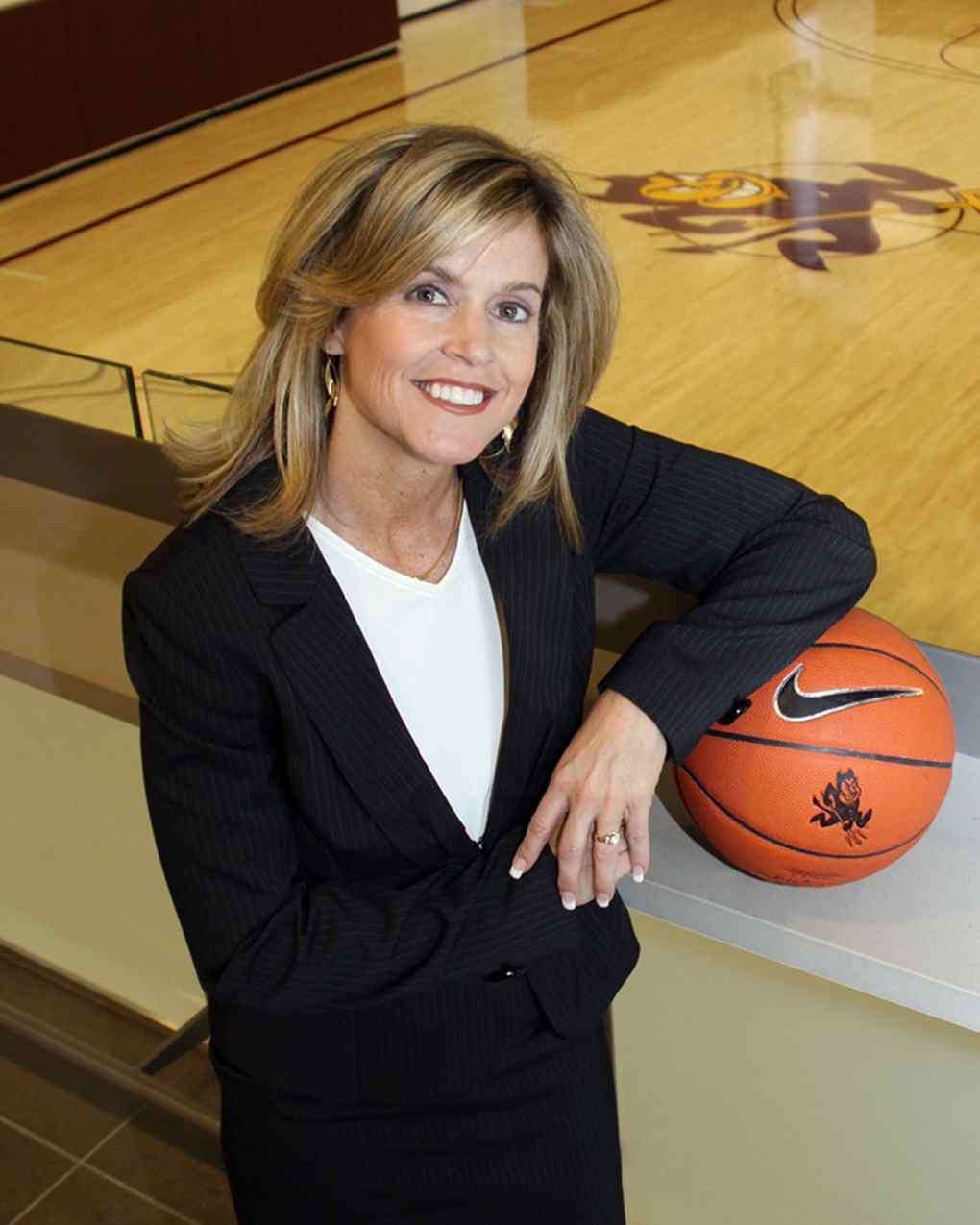

Biographical details
- Born: March 10, 1966 (age 60); Van Nuys, California

Playing career
- 1984–1988: Stanford
- Position: Guard

Coaching career (HC unless noted)
- 1988–1990: Washington (grad. asst.)
- 1990–1993: Santa Clara (asst.)
- 1993–1996: Northern Arizona
- 1996–2022: Arizona State
- 2023: Phoenix Mercury (asst.)

Head coaching record
- Overall: 528–334 (.613)

Accomplishments and honors

Championships
- Pac-10 Championship 2001; Pac-10 Tournament Championship 2002; Pac-12 Championship 2016

Awards
- Pac-10 Coach of the Year 2001; Pac-12 Coach of the Year 2016
Medal record
FIBA Under-21 World Championship for Women
Gold medal – first place	2007 Russia	Team competition
World University Games
Gold medal – first place	2009 Serbia	Team competition

Charli Turner Thorne (born March 10, 1966) is a former head coach for the Arizona State Sun Devils women's basketball team and assistant coach for the Phoenix Mercury of the WNBA. She has coached for 28 seasons from 1993 to 2022. She is the winningest Sun Devil coach since the team was established and as of 2019, stood as No. 2 all-time in the Pac-10/Pac-12 for career wins.

== Biography ==
Turner Thorne studied psychology at Stanford University, where she played basketball under Tara VanDerveer. She graduated in 1988 with a bachelor's degree and later studied for a master's degree in education at the University of Washington, graduating in 1990. She is married to Will Thorne and they have three children, Conor, Liam, and Quinn.

== Coaching career ==
Turner Thorne began her coaching career as a graduate assistant at Washington in 1988, then an assistant coach at Santa Clara in 1990. In 1993, Turner Thorne became head coach at Northern Arizona, winning consecutive seasons in 1994-95 and 1995–96, the first time the school had accomplished this. In 1996, she moved over to become the head coach at Arizona State University. Turner Thorne has led the Arizona State women's basketball team to the NCAA Tournament 14 times.

In the 2000-01 season, the Sun Devils under Turner Thorne achieved a 20-11 overall record and its first NCAA appearance in 22 years. In the 2001-2002 season, the team achieved a record of 25-9, which matched the single-season school record for most wins at that time. ASU shared the Pac-10 title in 2001 and the inaugural Pac-10 Tournament title in 2002, the first league championships the school had achieved.

In the 2006-07 season, the Sun Devils won 31 games, including a school record 16 Pac-10 wins, which brought them to the Elite Eight of the NCAA Tournament for the first time. At the end of the 2006-07 season, the Sun Devils ranked No. 8 in the final USA Today/ESPN coaches poll and No. 10 in the final Associated Press poll, the highest final rankings in each poll that the school had ever achieved. In the summer of 2007 Turner Thorne served as an assistant coach on USA Basketball's U-21 World Championship Team which won the gold medal at the U-21 FIBA World Championship in Moscow, Russia.

In 2009 the Sun Devils made the Elite Eight of the NCAA Tournament for the second time in three seasons under Turner Thorne's leadership. Having achieved 26 wins in the 2008-09 season, Turner Thorne became one of three Pac-10 coaches alongside University of Washington head coach Chris Gobrecht and Stanford University head coach Tara VanDerveer to have led their respective schools to five or more consecutive 20-win seasons.

During the summer of 2009, Turner Thorne served as the head coach for the USA Women's World University Games Team which won the gold medal at the 2009 World University Games in Belgrade, Serbia, having won all seven of their games. It was Turner Thorne's second time working with USA Basketball.

In July 2009, Turner Thorne became vice president of the Women's Basketball Coaches Association's (WBCA) Executive Committee.

For the 2011–12 basketball season, Turner Thorne took a leave of absence from her coaching duties and returned for the 2012–13 season. On March 3, 2022, Turner Thorne announced her coaching retirement.

Turner Thorne returned to the bench in 2023, when she was hired by the Phoenix Mercury of the WNBA on June 30, 2023. She became an assistant coach for the Mercury, reuniting with former Sun Devil assistant coach Nikki Blue who became the interim head coach.

== Year-by-year results ==
Record table
Season	Team	Overall	Conference	Standing	Postseason
Northern Arizona Lumberjacks (Big Sky Conference) (1993–1996)
1993–94	Northern Arizona	12–15	6–8	T-4th	
1994–95	Northern Arizona	14–12	6–8	5th	
1995–96	Northern Arizona	14–13	6–8	5th	
Northern Arizona:		40–40 (.500)	18–24 (.429)		
Arizona State Sun Devils (Pacific-10 Conference) (1996–2011)
1996–97	Arizona State	9–19	3–15	9th	
1997–98	Arizona State	10–17	6–12	T-7th	
1998–99	Arizona State	12–15	6–12	T-6th	
1999–00	Arizona State	14–15	7–11	7th	WNIT 1st Round
2000–01	Arizona State	20–11	12–6	T-1st	NCAA First Round
2001–02	Arizona State	25–9	12–6	T-2nd	NCAA Second Round
2002–03	Arizona State	16–14	7–11	8th	WNIT 2nd Round
2003–04	Arizona State	17–12	11–7	T-3rd	WNIT 1st Round
2004–05	Arizona State	24–10	12–6	T-2nd	NCAA Sweet Sixteen
2005–06	Arizona State	25–7	14–4	2nd	NCAA Second Round
2006–07	Arizona State	31–5	16–2	2nd	NCAA Elite Eight
2007–08	Arizona State	22–11	14–4	3rd	NCAA Second Round
2008–09	Arizona State	26–9	15–3	T-2nd	NCAA Elite Eight
2009–10	Arizona State	18–14	9–9	5th	WNIT 2nd Round
2010–11	Arizona State	20–11	11–7	3rd	NCAA First Round
Arizona State Sun Devils (Pac-12 Conference) (2012–present)
2012–13	Arizona State	13–18	5–13	9th	
2013–14	Arizona State	23–10	11–7	4th	NCAA Second Round
2014–15	Arizona State	29–6	15–3	2nd	NCAA Sweet Sixteen
2015–16	Arizona State	26–7	16–2	T-1st	NCAA Second Round
2016–17	Arizona State	20–13	9–9	5th	NCAA Second Round
2017–18	Arizona State	22–13	10–8	6th	NCAA Second Round
2018–19	Arizona State	22–11	10–7	5th	NCAA Sweet Sixteen
2019–20	Arizona State	20–11	10–8	T-5th	Postseason not held due to COVID-19
2020–21	Arizona State	12-12	6-9	9th	WNIT 1st Round
2021–22	Arizona State	12-14	4-9	9th	
Arizona State:		488–294 (.624)	247–190 (.565)		
Total:		528–334 (.613)			
National champion Postseason invitational champion Conference regular season champion Conference regular season and conference tournament champion Division regular season champion Division regular season and conference tournament champion Conference tournament champion

== Career statistics ==
Legend
GP	Games played	GS	Games started	MPG	Minutes per game	RPG	Rebounds per game
APG	Assists per game	SPG	Steals per game	BPG	Blocks per game	PPG	Points per game
TO	Turnovers per game	FG%	Field-goal percentage	3P%	3-point field-goal percentage	FT%	Free-throw percentage
**Bold**	Career best	°	League leader

=== College ===
Year	Team	GP	GS	MPG	FG%	3P%	FT%	RPG	APG	SPG	BPG	TO	PPG
1987–88	Stanford	31	-	41.3	22.2	86.7	0.8	1.7	0.4	0.0	-	1.8	
**Career**		31	-	41.3	22.2	86.7	0.8	1.7	0.4	0.0	-	1.8	
Statistics retrieved from Sports-Reference.
