= 2020–21 Stanford Cardinal women's basketball team =

Intercollegiate basketball season

2020–21 Stanford Cardinal women's basketball

NCAA tournament National champions Pac-12 tournament champions Pac-12 regular season champions
- Conference: Pac-12 Conference

Ranking
- Coaches: No. 1
- AP: No. 2
- Record: 31–2 (19–2 Pac-12)
- Head coach: Tara VanDerveer (35th season)
- Associate head coach: Kate Paye (14th season)
- Assistant coaches: Katy Steding (1st season); Britney Anderson (1st season)
- Home arena: Maples Pavilion

2020–21 Pac-12 Conference women's basketball standings
	Conf.				Overall
Team	W		L	PCT	W		L	PCT
No. 2 Stanford†	19	–	2	.905	31	–	2	.939
No. 11 Arizona	13	–	4	.765	21	–	6	.778
No. 9 UCLA	12	–	4	.750	17	–	6	.739
No. 23 Oregon	10	–	7	.588	15	–	9	.625
Oregon State	7	–	6	.538	12	–	8	.600
Colorado	8	–	8	.500	12	–	11	.522
Washington State	9	–	10	.474	12	–	12	.500
USC	8	–	10	.444	11	–	12	.478
Arizona State	6	–	9	.400	11	–	12	.478
Utah	4	–	15	.211	5	–	16	.238
Washington	3	–	13	.188	7	–	14	.333
California	1	–	12	.077	1	–	16	.059
† 2021 Pac-12 Tournament winner As of March 29, 2021; Rankings from AP poll

The 2020–21 Stanford Cardinal women's basketball team represented Stanford University during the 2020–21 NCAA Division I women's basketball season. The Cardinal, led by thirty-fifth year head coach Tara VanDerveer, played their home games at the Maples Pavilion as members of the Pac-12 Conference. As a result of Santa Clara County, California health orders, the Cardinal were unable to play in Palo Alto for much of their season, moving home games to Kaiser Permanente Arena in Santa Cruz. They finished the season 31–2, 19–2 in Pac-12 play to finish in first place. They won the Pac-12 women's tournament by defeating UCLA, earning an automatic bid to the NCAA women's tournament where they defeated Utah Valley and Oklahoma State in the first and second rounds, Missouri State in the Sweet Sixteen, Louisville in the Elite Eight, South Carolina in the Final Four and Arizona in the National Championship Game to win its third NCAA title overall and first since 1992. Haley Jones was named the Final Four Most Outstanding Player.

== Roster ==
2020–21 Stanford Cardinal women's basketball team
Players
Coaches

Pos.	#	Name	Height	Year	Previous school	Hometown
G	2	Agnes Emma-Nnopu	5 ft 11 in (1.8 m)	Fr	Lake Ginninderra College	Ocean Grove, Victoria
G	3	Anna Wilson	5 ft 9 in (1.75 m)	Sr	Bellevue	Bellevue, WA
G	4	Jana Van Gytenbeek	5 ft 7 in (1.7 m)	Fr	Cherry Creek	Greenwood Village, CO
F	5	Francesca Belibi	6 ft 1 in (1.85 m)	So	Regis Jesuit	Centennial, CO
F	10	Alyssa Jerome	6 ft 3 in (1.91 m)	Sr	Harbord Collegiate	Toronto, ON
F	11	Ashten Prechtel	6 ft 5 in (1.96 m)	So	Discovery Canyon	Colorado Springs, CO
F	12	Lexie Hull	6 ft 0 in (1.83 m)	Jr	Central Valley	Spokane, WA
F	15	Maya Dodson	6 ft 3 in (1.91 m)	Sr	St. Francis	Alpharetta, GA
F	22	Cameron Brink	6 ft 4 in (1.93 m)	Fr	Mountainside	Beaverton, OR
G	23	Kiana Williams	5 ft 8 in (1.73 m)	Sr	Karen Wagner	San Antonio, TX
F	24	Lacie Hull	6 ft 1 in (1.85 m)	Jr	Central Valley	Spokane, WA
G	30	Haley Jones	6 ft 1 in (1.85 m)	So	Archbishop Mitty	Santa Cruz, CA
G	33	Hannah Jump	6 ft 0 in (1.83 m)	So	Pinewood	San Jose, CA
G	54	Jenna Brown (injured)	5 ft 10 in (1.78 m)	Jr	The Lovett School	Atlanta, GA

Head coach

- Tara VanDerveer (Indiana)

Assistant coach(es)

- Kate Paye (Stanford)
- Katy Steding (Stanford)
- Britney Anderson (Virginia Tech)

Legend

- (C) Team captain
- (S) Suspended
- (I) Ineligible
- (W) Walk-on
- Injured
- Current redshirt

Roster
Last update: April 5, 2021

== Schedule ==
Date time, TV	Rank^{#}	Opponent^{#}	Result	Record	Site (attendance) city, state
Regular season
November 25, 2020*; 11:00 am, Stanford Live Stream	No. 2	Cal Poly	W 108–40	1–0	Maples Pavilion (0); Stanford, CA
November 30, 2020*; 2:00 pm, Stanford Live Stream	No. 2	San Diego; Canceled due to Santa Clara Public Health Department			Maples Pavilion; Stanford, CA
December 5, 2020*; 2:00 pm, Mountain West Network	No. 2	at UNLV	W 101–54	2–0	Thomas & Mack Center (0); Las Vegas, NV
December 6, 2020; 2:00 pm	No. 2	vs. Washington	W 83–50	3–0 (1–0)	Thomas & Mack Center (0); Las Vegas, NV
December 11, 2020*; 4:00 pm	No. 1	UC Davis; Canceled due to Santa Clara County ban on athletic activities.			Maples Pavilion; Stanford, CA
December 13, 2020; 7:00 pm, P12N	No. 1	at California	W 83–38	4–0 (2–0)	Haas Pavilion (0); Berkeley, CA
December 15, 2020*; 6:00 pm, ESPN2	No. 1	at Pacific	W 104–61	5–0	Stockton, CA (0); Alex G. Spanos Center
December 19, 2020; 6:00 pm, P12N	No. 1	at USC	W 80–60	6–0 (3–0)	Galen Center (0); Los Angeles, CA
December 21, 2020; 12:00 pm, P12N	No. 1	at No. 10 UCLA	W 61–49	7–0 (4–0)	Pauley Pavilion (0); Los Angeles, CA
January 1, 2021; 4:00 pm, P12N	No. 1	at No. 6 Arizona	W 81–54	8–0 (5–0)	McKale Center (0); Tucson, AZ
January 3, 2021; 3:00 pm, P12N	No. 1	at Arizona State	W 68–60	9–0 (6–0)	Desert Financial Arena (0); Tempe, AZ
January 8, 2021; 11:30 am, P12N	No. 1	vs. No. 11 Oregon	W 70–63	10–0 (7–0)	Kaiser Permanente Arena (0); Santa Cruz, CA
TBD; TBD		Oregon State postponed due to COVID-19 protocols within the Beavers' program.			Kaiser Permanente Arena; Santa Cruz, CA
January 15, 2021; 12:30 pm, P12N	No. 1	at Utah	W 82–54	11–0 (8–0)	Jon M. Huntsman Center (0); Salt Lake City, UT
January 17, 2021; 11:00 am, P12N	No. 1	at Colorado	L 72–77	11–1 (8–1)	CU Events Center (0); Boulder, CO
January 22, 2021; 7:00 pm, P12N	No. 5	vs. No. 6 UCLA	L 66-70	11–2 (8–2)	Kaiser Permanente Arena (0); Santa Cruz, CA
January 24, 2021; 4:00 pm, P12N	No. 5	vs. USC	W 86-59	12–2 (9–2)	Kaiser Permanente Arena (0); Santa Cruz, CA
January 27, 2021; 6:30 pm, P12N	No. 6	at Washington State	W 71-49	13–2 (10–2)	Beasley Coliseum (0); Pullman, WA
January 29, 2021; 12:00 pm, WSU Live Stream	No. 6	at Washington State	W 77-49	14–2 (11–2)	Beasley Coliseum (0); Pullman, WA
January 31, 2021; 1:00 pm, P12N	No. 6	at Washington	W 74–48	15–2 (12–2)	Alaska Airlines Arena (0); Seattle, WA
February 5, 2021; 6:00 pm, P12N	No. 6	Colorado; Breast Cancer Awareness Game	W 62–54	16–2 (13–2)	Maples Pavilion (1); Stanford, CA
February 7, 2021; 1:00 pm, P12N	No. 6	Utah	W 83–41	17–2 (14–2)	Maples Pavilion (1); Stanford, CA
February 12, 2021; 6:00 pm, P12N	No. 5	at Oregon State	W 83–58	18–2 (15–2)	Gill Coliseum (0); Corvallis, OR
February 15, 2021; 6:00 pm, ESPN2	No. 6	at No. 13 Oregon	W 63–61	19–2 (16–2)	Matthew Knight Arena (0); Eugene, OR
February 19, 2021; 7:00 pm, P12N	No. 6	Arizona State	W 80–41	20–2 (17–2)	Maples Pavilion; Stanford, CA
February 22, 2021; 6:00 pm, ESPN2	No. 4	No. 9 Arizona	W 62–48	21–2 (18–2)	Maples Pavilion; Stanford, CA
February 28, 2021; 1:00 pm, P12N	No. 4	California	W 72–33	22–2 (19–2)	Maples Pavilion (0); Stanford, CA
Pac-12 women's tournament
March 4, 2021; 2:00 pm, P12N	(1) No. 4	vs. (8) USC; Quarterfinals	W 92–53	23–2	Michelob Ultra Arena (0); Paradise, NV
March 5, 2021; 5:00 pm, P12N	(1) No. 4	vs. (5) Oregon State; Semifinals	W 79–45	24–2	Michelob Ultra Arena; Paradise, NV
March 5, 2021; 5:00 pm, P12N	(1) No. 4	vs. (3) No. 9 UCLA; Championship	W 75–55	25–2	Michelob Ultra Arena; Paradise, NV
NCAA women's tournament
March 21, 2021*; 7:00 pm, ESPN	(1 A) No. 2	vs. (16 A) Utah Valley; First Round	W 87–44	26–2	Alamodome; San Antonio, TX
March 23, 2021*; 6:00 pm, ESPN2	(1 A) No. 2	vs. (8 A) Oklahoma State; Second Round	W 73–62	27–2	UTSA Convocation Center; San Antonio, TX
March 28, 2021*; 12:00 pm, ABC	(1 A) No. 2	vs. (5 A) No. 20 Missouri State; Sweet Sixteen	W 89–62	28–2	Alamodome (1,072); San Antonio, TX
March 30, 2021*; 4:00 pm, ESPN	(1 A) No. 2	vs. (2 A) No. 8 Louisville; Elite Eight	W 78–63	29–2	Alamodome (1,483); San Antonio, TX
April 2, 2021*; 3:00 pm, ESPN	(1 A) No. 2	vs. (1 H) No. 6 South Carolina; Final Four	W 66–65	30–2	Alamodome; San Antonio, TX
April 4, 2021*; 3:00 pm, ESPN	(1 A) No. 2	vs. (3 M) No. 11 Arizona; National Championship	W 54–53	31–2	Alamodome (4,604); San Antonio, TX
*Non-conference game. ^{#}Rankings from AP Poll. (#) Tournament seedings in parentheses. A=Alamo H=HemisFair. All times are in Pacific Time.

== Rankings ==
Regular season polls
Poll	Pre- season	Week 2	Week 3	Week 4	Week 5	Week 6	Week 7	Week 8	Week 9	Week 10	Week 11	Week 12	Week 13	Week 14	Week 15	Week 16	Week 17	Final
AP	2	2	1 (24)	1 (26)	1 (26)	1 (26)	1 (27)	1 (29)	5 (1)	6	6	5	6 (1)	4 (1)	4 (1)	2 (5)	2 (5)	N/A
Coaches	2	^	1 (22)	1 (22)	1 (30)	1 (29)	1 (31)	1 (31)	4 (1)	6	6	4	4	2	3	2 (4)	2 (5)	1 (32)

Legend
	Increase in ranking
	Decrease in ranking
	Not ranked previous week
RV	Received votes
NR	Not ranked
( )	Number of first place votes

^ Coaches did not release a Week 2 poll
