= 2020–21 Washington State Cougars women's basketball team =

Intercollegiate basketball season

2020–21 Washington State Cougars women's basketball

NCAA tournament, first round
- Conference: Pac-12 Conference
- Record: 12–12 (9–10 Pac-12)
- Head coach: Kamie Ethridge (3rd season)
- Assistant coaches: Laurie Koehn; Jason Chainey; Camille Williams
- Home arena: Beasley Coliseum

2020–21 Pac-12 Conference women's basketball standings
	Conf.				Overall
Team	W		L	PCT	W		L	PCT
No. 2 Stanford†	19	–	2	.905	31	–	2	.939
No. 11 Arizona	13	–	4	.765	21	–	6	.778
No. 9 UCLA	12	–	4	.750	17	–	6	.739
No. 23 Oregon	10	–	7	.588	15	–	9	.625
Oregon State	7	–	6	.538	12	–	8	.600
Colorado	8	–	8	.500	12	–	11	.522
Washington State	9	–	10	.474	12	–	12	.500
USC	8	–	10	.444	11	–	12	.478
Arizona State	6	–	9	.400	11	–	12	.478
Utah	4	–	15	.211	5	–	16	.238
Washington	3	–	13	.188	7	–	14	.333
California	1	–	12	.077	1	–	16	.059
† 2021 Pac-12 Tournament winner As of March 29, 2021; Rankings from AP poll

The 2020–21 Washington State Cougars women's basketball team represented Washington State University during the 2020–21 NCAA Division I women's basketball season. The Cougars, led by third-year head coach Kamie Ethridge, played their home games at the Beasley Coliseum as members of the Pac-12 Conference.

== Previous season ==
The 2019–2020 edition of the WSU Cougars women's basketball team finished with a record of 11 wins and 20 losses. The Cougars finished Pac-12 Conference play with a record of four wins and 14 losses. This resulted in an 11th-place finish in the regular season conference standings. In the 2020 Pac-12 Conference women's basketball tournament, the Cougars were defeated by the Oregon State Beavers in the tournament's first round. The NCAA tournament and WNIT were cancelled due to the COVID-19 outbreak.

== Roster ==
2020–21 Washington State Cougars women's basketball team
Players
Coaches

Pos.	#	Name	Height	Year	Previous school	Hometown
G	2	Michaela Jones	5 ft 10 in (1.78 m)	RS So	Beatrice	Wymore, NE
G	3	Emma Nankervis	6 ft 3 in (1.91 m)	So	N/A	Mount, Eliza, Australia
G	4	Krystal Leger-Walker	5 ft 9 in (1.75 m)	RS Sr	N/A	Waikato, New Zealand
G	5	Charlisse Leger-Walker	5 ft 10 in (1.78 m)	Fr	St. Peter's School	Waikato, New Zealand
G	10	Ekin Celikdemir	5 ft 10 in (1.78 m)	Fr	Tilton	Istanbul, Turkey
F	13	Shir Levy	5 ft 11 in (1.8 m)	Jr	Gymnasia Realit	Ness Ziona, Israel
C	14	Jessica Clarke	6 ft 3 in (1.91 m)	Fr	St. Thomas Aquinas	North Vancouver, Canada
F	15	Ula Motuga	6 ft 0 in (1.83 m)	Jr	Caterbury College	Logan, Australia
G	20	Grace Sarver	5 ft 8 in (1.73 m)	So	West Seattle	Seattle, WA
G	21	Johanna Teder	5 ft 8 in (1.73 m)	So	South Plains College	Tartu, Estonia
G	22	Celena Molina	5 ft 9 in (1.75 m)	RS Jr	Konawaena	Kailua, HI
C	55	Bella Murekatete	6 ft 5 in (1.96 m)	So	Genesis Prep Academy	Ngoma Huye, Nigeria

Head coach

- Kamie Ethridge (Texas)

Assistant coach(es)

- Laurie Koehn (Kansas State)
- Jason Chainey (Yeronga institute of TAFE)
- Camille Williams (Wisconsin)

Legend

- (C) Team captain
- (S) Suspended
- (I) Ineligible
- (W) Walk-on
- Injured
- Current redshirt

Roster
Last update: March 19, 2021

== Schedule ==
Date time, TV	Rank^{#}	Opponent^{#}	Result	Record	Site (attendance) city, state
Regular season
December 6, 2020; TBD		at California	Postponed		Haas Pavilion; Berkeley, CA
December 11, 2020; 4:00 p.m., P12N		at Washington	W 60–52	1–0 (1–0)	Alaska Airlines Arena (0); Seattle, WA
December 13, 2020*; 6:30 p.m.		Idaho; Battle of the Palouse	W 74–55	2–0	Beasley Coliseum (0); Pullman, WA
December 19, 2020; Noon, P12N		No. 21 Oregon State	W 61–55	3–0 (2–0)	Beasley Coliseum (0); Pullman, WA
December 21, 2020; 11:00 a.m., P12N		No. 7 Oregon	L 65–69	3–1 (2–1)	Beasley Coliseum (0); Pullman, WA
December 22, 2020*; Noon		Eastern Washington	W 73–52	4–1	Beasley Coliseum (0); Pullman, WA
January 1, 2021; 11:00 a.m.		at Utah	W 79–74	5–1 (3–1)	Jon M. Huntsman Center (0); Salt Lake City, UT
January 3, 2021; 11:00 a.m., P12N		at Colorado	W 76–63	6–1 (4–1)	CU Events Center (0); Boulder, CO
January 8, 2021; 4:00 p.m., P12N		Arizona State	Postponed		Beasley Coliseum (0); Pullman, WA
January 10, 2021; 11:00 a.m., P12N		No. 7 Arizona	W 71–69 ^{OT}	7–1 (5–1)	Beasley Coliseum (0); Pullman, WA
January 15, 2021; 4:30 p.m., P12N	No. 25	at USC	L 77–81 ^{OT}	7–2 (5–2)	Galen Center (0); Los Angeles, CA
January 17, 2021; 11:00 a.m., P12N	No. 25	at No. 8 UCLA	L 66–68 ^{OT}	7–3 (5–3)	Pauley Pavilion (0); Los Angeles, CA
January 22, 2021; 5:00 p.m., P12N		at No. 13 Oregon	L 50–58	7–4 (5–4)	Matthew Knight Arena (0); Eugene, OR
January 24, 2021; 2:00 p.m.		at Oregon State	W 77–75 ^{2OT}	8–4 (6–4)	Gill Coliseum (0); Corvallis, OR
January 27, 2021; 6:30 p.m., P12N		No. 6 Stanford	L 49–71	8–5 (6–5)	Beasley Coliseum (0); Pullman, WA
January 29, 2021; Noon		No. 6 Stanford	L 49–77	8–6 (6–6)	Beasley Coliseum (0); Pullman, WA
January 31, 2021; Noon		California	Postponed		Beasley Coliseum; Pullman, WA
February 5, 2021; Noon		No. 5 UCLA	W 67–63	9–6 (7–6)	Beasley Coliseum (0); Pullman, WA
February 7, 2021; Noon		USC	L 71–81	9–7 (7–7)	Beasley Coliseum (0); Pullman, WA
February 12, 2021; 6:00 p.m., P12N		at No. 10 Arizona	L 51–60	9–8 (7–8)	McKale Center (0); Tucson, AZ
February 14, 2021; 11:30 a.m.		at Arizona State	L 61–67	9–9 (7–9)	Desert Financial Arena (0); Tempe, AZ
February 19, 2021; Noon		Colorado	L 57–60	9–10 (7–10)	Beasley Coliseum (200); Pullman, WA
February 21, 2021; Noon		Utah	W 68–55	10–10 (8–10)	Beasley Coliseum (0); Pullman, WA
February 28, 2021; 1:00 p.m., P12N		Washington	W 61–52	11–10 (9–10)	Beasley Coliseum (0); Pullman, WA
Pac-12 Women's Tournament
March 3, 2021; 5:00 p.m., P12N	(7)	vs. (10) Utah; First Round	W 57–48	12–10	Michelob Ultra Arena (18); Paradise, NV
March 4, 2021; 5:00 p.m., P12N	(7)	vs. (2) No. 11 Arizona; Quarterfinals	L 44–60	12–11	Michelob Ultra Arena (41); Paradise, NV
NCAA Women's Tournament
March 21, 2021; 6:30 p.m., ESPN2	(9 M)	vs. (8 M) No. 19 South Florida; First Round	L 53–57	12–12	Frank Erwin Center; Austin, TX
*Non-conference game. ^{#}Rankings from AP Poll. (#) Tournament seedings in parentheses. M=Mercado. All times are in Pacific Time.

== Rankings ==
- 2019–20 NCAA Division I women's basketball rankings

Regular season polls
Poll	Pre- season	Week 2	Week 3	Week 4	Week 5	Week 6	Week 7	Week 8	Week 9	Week 10	Week 11	Week 12	Week 13	Week 14	Week 15	Week 16	Week 17	Final
AP							RV	25	RV									N/A
Coaches							RV	RV	RV				RV					

Legend
	Increase in ranking
	Decrease in ranking
	Not ranked previous week
(RV)	Received votes
(NR)	Not ranked

== See also ==
- 2020–21 Washington State Cougars men's basketball team
