= 2020–21 USC Trojans women's basketball team =

Intercollegiate basketball season

2020–21 USC Trojans women's basketball
- Conference: Pac-12 Conference
- Record: 11–12 (8–10 Pac-12)
- Head coach: Mark Trakh (4th consecutive; 9th overall season)
- Assistant coaches: Jason Glover (4th season); Aarika Hughes (4th season); Erin Grant (2nd season)
- Home arena: Galen Center

2020–21 Pac-12 Conference women's basketball standings
	Conf.				Overall
Team	W		L	PCT	W		L	PCT
No. 2 Stanford†	19	–	2	.905	31	–	2	.939
No. 11 Arizona	13	–	4	.765	21	–	6	.778
No. 9 UCLA	12	–	4	.750	17	–	6	.739
No. 23 Oregon	10	–	7	.588	15	–	9	.625
Oregon State	7	–	6	.538	12	–	8	.600
Colorado	8	–	8	.500	12	–	11	.522
Washington State	9	–	10	.474	12	–	12	.500
USC	8	–	10	.444	11	–	12	.478
Arizona State	6	–	9	.400	11	–	12	.478
Utah	4	–	15	.211	5	–	16	.238
Washington	3	–	13	.188	7	–	14	.333
California	1	–	12	.077	1	–	16	.059
† 2021 Pac-12 Tournament winner As of March 29, 2021; Rankings from AP poll

The 2020–21 USC Trojans women's basketball team represented the University of Southern California during the 2020–21 NCAA Division I women's basketball season. The Trojans play their home games at the Galen Center and are members of the Pac-12 Conference. The squad was led by head coach Mark Trakh, who was in the 4th year of his 2nd stint (9th year overall). This year, the season was shortened to accommodate safety measures due to the COVID-19 pandemic. As such, no fans were permitted at any of the games.

USC finished the regular season 10–11 (8–10) and earned the 8th seed in the 2020 Pac-12 Conference women's basketball tournament.

== Previous season ==
The 2019–20 Women of Troy finished unranked with an overall record of 17–14. In Pac-12 play, their record was 8–10, and they finished in seventh place. Because of the pandemic, the previous season ended abruptly after the Pac-12 Tournament, at which the Women of Troy reached the quarterfinals.

== Offseason changes ==
=== Departures ===
Name	Number	Pos.	Height	Year	Hometown	Reason for Departure
Kayla Overbeck	1	F	6'1"	Senior	Newbury Park, CA	Graduated
Stephanie Watts	5	G	5'11"	Graduate Student	Wesley Chapel, NC	Transferred to North Carolina
Aliyah Jeune	11	G	6'1"	Graduate Student	Westampton, NJ	Graduated

=== Incoming transfers ===
Name	Num	Pos.	Height	Year	Hometown	Previous School
Jordan Sanders	5	F	5'11"	Graduate Student	Springfield, MO	UC Irvine
Shemera Williams	11	G	5'8"	Sophomore	Milwaukee, WI	Virginia

=== 2020 recruiting class ===
Name	Overall Rank	Position	Position Rank	Hometown	High School	Height	ESPN Stars	ESPN Grade
Jordyn Jenkins	41	F	10	Kent, WA	Kentridge High School	6'2"	5	97
Zayla Tinner		G	10	Amarillo, TX	Amarillo High School	6'2"	3	90
Amaya Oliver		G	30	Stockton, CA	St. Mary's High School (Stockton, California)	6'2"	3	89

== Current roster ==
2020–21 USC Trojans women's basketball team
Players
Coaches

Pos.	#	Name	Height	Year	Previous school	Hometown
G	0	Shalexxus Aaron (C)	6 ft 1 in (1.85 m)	RS So	Martin Luther King HS	Apple Valley, CA
G	3	Zayla Tinner	5 ft 10 in (1.78 m)	Fr	Amarillo High School	Amarillo, TX
G	4	Endyia Rogers	5 ft 7 in (1.7 m)	So	Bishop Lynch HS	Dallas, TX
F	5	Jordan Sanders	5 ft 11 in (1.8 m)	GS	UC Irvine	Springfield, MO
G	10	Amaya Oliver	6 ft 2 in (1.88 m)	Fr	St. Mary's HS	Stockton, CA
G	11	Shemera Williams	5 ft 8 in (1.73 m)	So	Virginia	Milwaukee, WI
C	15	Angel Jackson	6 ft 5 in (1.96 m)	So	Salesian HS	Richmond, CA
G	22	Kyra White	6 ft 5 in (1.96 m)	So	Converse Judson HS	Converse, TX
G	23	Madison Campbell	5 ft 11 in (1.8 m)	RS Fr	Clovis West HS	Fresno, CA
G	24	Desiree Caldwell (C)	5 ft 8 in (1.73 m)	Jr	Byron P. Steel II HS	San Antonio, TX
G	25	Alyson Miura	5 ft 8 in (1.73 m)	So	La Salle Prep	Clackamas, OR
G	30	India Otto (W)	5 ft 9 in (1.75 m)	So	Windward HS	Los Angeles, CA
F	32	Jordyn Jenkins	6 ft 2 in (1.88 m)	Fr	Kentridge HS	Kent, WA
F	35	Alissa Pili (C)	6 ft 0 in (1.83 m)	So	Dimond HS	Anchorage, AK

Head coach

- Mark Trakh (Long Beach State)

Assistant coach(es)

- Jason Glover (Grand Canyon)
- Aarika Hughes (USC)
- Erin Grant (Texas Tech)

Legend

- (C) Team captain
- (S) Suspended
- (I) Ineligible
- (W) Walk-on
- Injured
- Current redshirt

Roster
Last update: December 9, 2020

=== Player recognition ===
- Alyson Miura
  - Pac-12 Academic Honor Roll
- Amaya Oliver
  - All Pac-12 Freshman Team Honorable Mention
- India Otto
  - Pac-12 Academic Honor Roll
- Alissa Pili
  - Last year, Pili was selected as Pac-12 Freshman of the Year for the previous season. She was also a member of the All Pac-12 Team and the Freshman All Pac-12 Team.
  - Pili was recognized with preseason awards as a member of the 2020–21 Pac-12 Women's Basketball Preseason Media All-Conference Team.
  - Just before the season started, Pili was added to the watchlists for both the Katrina McClain Power Forward of the Year Award and the 2021 Jersey Mike's Naismith Trophy.
  - Honored as Pac-12 Player of the Week on February 8, 2021.
  - All Pac-12 Honorable Mention
- Endiya Rogers
  - The Pac-12 recognized Rogers with a preseason All-Conference Honorable Mention.
  - On February 1, 2021, Rogers was recognized as the Pac-12 Player of the Week.
  - All Pac-12 Team
- Jordan Sanders
  - On December 28, 2020, Sanders was announced as the Pac-12 Player of the Week.
  - Two days later, she was recognized again, this time as a member of the NCAA's Starting Five for Week 5.
  - All Pac-12 Honorable Mention

=== Injuries ===
- Tinner's (knee) debut as a Trojan took place on December 13, 2020 against UCLA.
- Jenkins (foot) debuted against Utah on January 8, 2021.
- Campbell was out from January 8, 2021 until February 5, 2021.
- Pili (ankle) returned to play against Washington State on January 15, 2021.
- Aaron (ankle) made her return to the court against UCR on January 17, 2021. She had been out for nearly two years.
- Jackson missed the Long Beach State game. She was then absent for the away games against Washington and Washington State.
- Miura (knee) made her first appearance this season on February 5, 2021 against Washington.
- Sanders was injured on January 31, 2021 against ASU. She returned to play on February 12, 2021 against Colorado.

== Schedule ==
Date time, TV	Rank^{#}	Opponent^{#}	Result	Record	High points	High rebounds	High assists	Site city, state
Regular Season
11/25/2020*; 1:00 pm, USC Live Stream		Loyola Marymount	W 85–55	1–0	19 – Campbell	16 – Oliver	7 – Caldwell	Galen Center; Los Angeles, CA
12/04/2020; 4:00 pm, P12N		at Arizona State	L 58–63	1–1 (0–1)	15 – Rogers	9 – Oliver	6 – Rogers	Desert Financial Arena; Tempe, AZ
12/06/2020; 12:00 pm, Arizona Live Stream		at No. 7 Arizona	L 77–78	1–2 (0–2)	18 – 2 Tied	8 – Rogers	7 – Rogers	McKale Center; Tucson, AZ
12/13/2020; 12:00 pm, P12N		No. 11 UCLA; Rivalry	L 52–73	1–3 (0–3)	12 – Sanders	8 – Jackson	5 – Caldwell	Galen Center; Los Angeles, CA
12/19/2020; 6:00 pm, P12N		No. 1 Stanford	L 60–80	1–4 (0–4)	26 – Rogers	5 – Jackson	4 – White	Galen Center; Los Angeles, CA
12/21/2020; 2:00 pm, P12N		California	W 77–54	2–4 (1–4)	22 – Sanders	9 – Oliver	7 – Caldwell	Galen Center; Los Angeles, CA
12/23/2020*; 4:00 pm, USC Live Stream		Long Beach State	W 71–65	3–4	23 – Sanders	8 – Sanders	8 – White	Galen Center; Los Angeles, CA
01/01/2021; 6:00 pm, P12N		No. 8 Oregon	L 69–92	3–5 (1–5)	20 – Rogers	8 – Jackson	4 – White	Matthew Knight Arena; Eugene, OR
1/3/21		Oregon State; Canceled						Gill Coliseum; Corvallis, OR
01/08/2021; 6:00 pm, P12N		Utah	W 60–59	4–5 (2–5)	17 – Rogers	6 – 3 Tied	5 – Caldwell	Galen Center; Los Angeles, CA
01/11/2021; 12:00 pm, P12N		Colorado	W 56–52	5–5 (3–5)	16 – Sanders	13 – Jackson	5 – Rogers	Galen Center; Los Angeles, CA
01/15/2021; 4:30 pm, P12N		No. 25 Washington State	W 81–77 ^{OT}	6–5 (4–5)	24 – Sanders	9 – Jenkins	4 – White	Galen Center; Los Angeles, CA
Originally 1/17/21; 3:00 pm		Washington; Canceled						Galen Center; Los Angeles, CA
1/17/2021*; 3:00 pm, USC Live Stream		UC Riverside	L 52–54	6–6 (4–5)	14 – Rogers	6 – Jackson	2 – 2 Tied	Galen Center; Los Angeles, CA
1/22/21; 4:00 pm		California; Canceled						Haas Pavilion; Berkeley, CA
01/24/2021; 4:00 pm, P12N		No. 5 Stanford; Moved to UCSC due to COVID-19 precautions	L 59–86	6–7 (4–6)	19 – Rogers	4 – Rogers	2 – 2 Tied	Kaiser Permanente Arena; Santa Cruz, CA
1/29/21; 4:00 pm		No. 10 Arizona; Canceled						Galen Center; Los Angeles, CA
01/31/2021; 1:00 pm, USC Live Stream		Arizona State	W 65–57	7–7 (5–6)	30 – Rogers	6 – Rogers	5 – Rogers	Galen Center; Los Angeles, CA
02/05/2021; 7:00 pm, Washington Live Stream		Washington	W 63–54	8–7 (6–6)	17 – Pili	9 – Jenkins	2 – 2 Tied	Alaska Airlines Arena; Seattle, WA
02/07/2021; 12:00 pm, WSU Live Stream		Washington State	W 81–71	9–7 (7–6)	22 – Rogers	8 – Rogers	5 – Rogers	Beasley Coliseum; Pullman, WA
02/12/2021; 5:00 pm, Colorado Live Stream		Colorado	L 56–66	9–8 (7–7)	12 – Pili	7 – Pili	7 – Caldwell	CU Events Center; Boulder, CO
02/14/2021; 3:00 pm, Utah Live Stream		Utah	W 66–49	10–8 (8–7)	17 – Rogers	7 – Rogers	7 – Rogers	Jon M. Huntsman Center; Salt Lake City, UT
02/19/2021; 2:30 pm, P12N		Oregon State	L 52–77	10–9 (8–8)	13 – Pili	5 – Pili	4 – Rogers	Galen Center; Los Angeles, CA
02/21/2021; 12:00 pm, P12N		No. 13 Oregon	L 48–72	10–10 (8–9)	14 – Pili	7 – Rogers	5 – Rogers	Galen Center; Los Angeles, CA
02/28/2021; 1:00 pm, P12N		UCLA; Rivalry	L 51–93	10–11 (8–10)	18 – Pili	5 – Pili	7 – Rogers	Pauley Pavilion; Los Angeles, CA
Pac-12 Women's Tournament
03/3/2021; 2:00 pm, P12N	(8)	(9) Arizona State; First Round	W 71–65	11–11	16 – Jenkins	6 – Jenkins	11 – Rogers	Mandalay Bay Events Center; Paradise, NV
03/4/2021; 2:00 pm, P12N	(8)	(1) No. 4 Stanford; Quarterfinals	L 53–92	11–12	9 – 2 Tied	11 – Jenkins	2 – 2 Tied	Mandalay Bay Events Center; Paradise, NV
*Non-conference game. ^{#}Rankings from AP Poll. (#) Tournament seedings in parentheses. All times are in Pacific Time.

== Rankings ==
2020–21 NCAA Division I women's basketball rankings

Regular season polls
Poll	Pre- Season	Week 2	Week 3	Week 4	Week 5	Week 6	Week 7	Week 8	Week 9	Week 10	Week 11	Week 12	Week 13	Week 14	Week 15	Week 16	Week 17	Week 18	Week 19	Final
AP	NR	NR	NR	NR	NR	NR	NR	NR	NR	NR	NR	NR	NR	NR	NR					
Coaches	NR	^	NR	NR	NR	NR	NR	NR	NR	NR	NR	RV	NR	NR	NR					

Legend
	Increase in ranking
	Decrease in ranking
	Not Ranked Previous Week
(RV)	Received Votes
(NR)	Not Ranked
^	No Poll
