= 2021 Pac-12 Conference women's basketball tournament =

- Classification: Division I
- Season: 2020–21
- Teams: 12
- Site: Michelob Ultra Arena; Las Vegas, NV
- Champions: Stanford (14th title)
- Winning coach: Tara VanDerveer (14th title)
- MVP: Kiana Williams (Stanford)
- Television: Pac-12 Network, ESPN2

2020–21 Pac-12 Conference women's basketball standings
	Conf.				Overall
Team	W		L	PCT	W		L	PCT
No. 2 Stanford†	19	–	2	.905	31	–	2	.939
No. 11 Arizona	13	–	4	.765	21	–	6	.778
No. 9 UCLA	12	–	4	.750	17	–	6	.739
No. 23 Oregon	10	–	7	.588	15	–	9	.625
Oregon State	7	–	6	.538	12	–	8	.600
Colorado	8	–	8	.500	12	–	11	.522
Washington State	9	–	10	.474	12	–	12	.500
USC	8	–	10	.444	11	–	12	.478
Arizona State	6	–	9	.400	11	–	12	.478
Utah	4	–	15	.211	5	–	16	.238
Washington	3	–	13	.188	7	–	14	.333
California	1	–	12	.077	1	–	16	.059
† 2021 Pac-12 Tournament winner As of March 29, 2021; Rankings from AP poll

The 2021 Pac-12 Conference women's basketball tournament, presented by New York Life, was a postseason tournament held March 3–7, 2021, at Michelob Ultra Arena on the Las Vegas Strip in Paradise, Nevada. Stanford won its 14th Pac-12 title, receiving a bid to the 2021 NCAA tournament.

== Seeds ==
Seed	School	Conf.	Over.
#1	Stanford	19–2	22–2
#2	Arizona	13–4	15–4
#3	UCLA	12–4	14–4
#4	Oregon	10–7	13–7
#5	Oregon State	7–6	9–6
#6	Colorado	8–8	10–9
#7	Washington State	9–10	11–10
#8	USC	8–10	10–11
#9	Arizona State	6–9	11–9
#10	Utah	4–15	5–15
#11	Washington	3–13	6–13
#12	California	1–12	1–15

== Schedule ==
Session	Game	Time	Matchup	Television	Attendance
First Round – Wednesday, March 3
1	1	11:00 AM	#5 Oregon State 71 vs. #12 California 63	P12N	
1	2	2:00 PM	#8 USC 71 vs. #9 Arizona State 65	P12N	
2	3	5:00 PM	#7 Washington State 57 vs. #10 Utah 48	P12N	
2	4	8:00 PM	#6 Colorado 54 vs. #11 Washington 68	P12N	
Quarterfinals – Thursday, March 4
3	5	11:00 AM	#4 Oregon 64 vs. #5 Oregon State 71	P12N	
3	6	2:00 PM	#1 Stanford 92 vs #8 USC 53	P12N	
4	7	5:00 PM	#2 Arizona 60 vs. #7 Washington State 44	P12N	
4	8	8:00 PM	#3 UCLA 58 vs. #11 Washington 46	P12N	
Semifinals – Friday, March 5
5	9	5:00 PM	#5 Oregon State 45 vs. #1 Stanford 79	P12N	
5	10	8:00 PM	#2 Arizona 49 vs. #3 UCLA 58	P12N	
Championship Game – Sunday, March 7
6	11	5:00 PM	#1 Stanford 75 vs. #3 UCLA 55	ESPN2	
Game times in PT. Rankings denote tournament seeds.

== Bracket ==
First round Wednesday, March 3 P12N
8	USC	71
9	Arizona State	65
5	Oregon State	71
12	California	63
7	Washington State	57
10	Utah	48
6	Colorado	54
11	Washington	68

Quarterfinals; Thursday, March 4 P12N
1	Stanford	92
8	USC	53
4	Oregon	64
5	Oregon State	71
2	Arizona	60
7	Washington State	44
3	UCLA	58
11	Washington	46

Semifinals; Friday, March 5 P12N
1	Stanford	79
5	Oregon State	45
2	Arizona	49
3	UCLA	58

Championship Game; Sunday, March 7 ESPN2
1	Stanford	75
3	UCLA	55

Note: * denotes overtime

=== All-Tournament Team ===
Name	Pos.	Year	Team
Cameron Brink	F	Fr.	Stanford
Aleah Goodman	G	Sr.	Oregon State
Lexie Hull	G	Jr.	Stanford
Aari McDonald	G	Sr.	Arizona
Michaela Onyenwere	F	Sr.	UCLA
Kiana Williams	G	Sr.	Stanford

=== Most Outstanding Player ===
Name	Pos.	Year	Team
Kiana Williams	G	Sr.	Stanford

== See also ==
- 2021 Pac-12 Conference men's basketball tournament
