= 2020–21 Arizona State Sun Devils women's basketball team =

American college basketball season

2020–21 Arizona State Sun Devils women's basketball
- Conference: Pac-12 Conference
- Record: 12–12 (6–9 Pac-12)
- Head coach: Charli Turner Thorne (24th season)
- Assistant coaches: Jackie Moore; Angie Nelp; Nikki Blue
- Home arena: Desert Financial Arena

2020–21 Pac-12 Conference women's basketball standings
	Conf.				Overall
Team	W		L	PCT	W		L	PCT
No. 2 Stanford†	19	–	2	.905	31	–	2	.939
No. 11 Arizona	13	–	4	.765	21	–	6	.778
No. 9 UCLA	12	–	4	.750	17	–	6	.739
No. 23 Oregon	10	–	7	.588	15	–	9	.625
Oregon State	7	–	6	.538	12	–	8	.600
Colorado	8	–	8	.500	12	–	11	.522
Washington State	9	–	10	.474	12	–	12	.500
USC	8	–	10	.444	11	–	12	.478
Arizona State	6	–	9	.400	11	–	12	.478
Utah	4	–	15	.211	5	–	16	.238
Washington	3	–	13	.188	7	–	14	.333
California	1	–	12	.077	1	–	16	.059
† 2021 Pac-12 Tournament winner As of March 29, 2021; Rankings from AP poll

The 2020–21 Arizona State Sun Devils women's basketball team represented Arizona State University during the 2020–21 NCAA Division I women's basketball season. The Sun Devils, were led by twenty fourth-year head coach Charli Turner Thorne, playing their home games at the Desert Financial Arena and are members of the Pac-12 Conference.

== Previous season ==
The Sun Devils finished the season 20–11, 10–8 in Pac-12 play to finish in sixth place. They advanced to the first round of the Pac-12 women's tournament where they lost to California. The NCAA tournament and WNIT were cancelled due to the COVID-19 pandemic.

== Roster ==
2020–21 Arizona State Sun Devils women's basketball team
Players
Coaches

Pos.	#	Name	Height	Year	Previous school	Hometown
G	0	Taya Hanson	5 ft 10 in (1.78 m)	Jr	Kelowna HS	Kelowna, BC
G	2	Jaddan Simmons	5 ft 9 in (1.75 m)	Fr	Green Bay Southwest HS	Green Bay, WI
G	3	Gabriela Bosquez	5 ft 7 in (1.7 m)	Jr	Blinn College	Kyle, TX
G	5	Jamie Loera	5 ft 9 in (1.75 m)	Jr	Moses Lake HS	Moses Lake, WA
G/F	10	Iris Mbulito	6 ft 1 in (1.85 m)	Jr	IES Poeta Tomás Morales Castellano	Las Palmas, Spain
G	11	Sydney Erikstrup	6 ft 1 in (1.85 m)	Fr	Beaverton HS	Portland, OR
G/F	13	Maggie Besselink	6 ft 3 in (1.91 m)	Fr	Holy Cross HS	Kingston, Ontario
F	20	Katelyn Levings	6 ft 3 in (1.91 m)	Fr	Edmond Memorial HS	Oklahoma City, OK
G	21	Sydnei Caldwell	5 ft 9 in (1.75 m)	So	Saddle River HS	Franklin Lakes, NJ
F	24	Bre’yanna Sanders	6 ft 0 in (1.83 m)	Sr	Clovis West HS	Fresno, CA
F	32	Jayde Van Hyfte	6 ft 1 in (1.85 m)	Jr	Annawan HS	Annawan, IL
C	43	Imogen Greenslade	6 ft 4 in (1.93 m)	Sr	MLC School	Sydney, Australia

Head coach

- Charli Turner Thorne (Stanford)

Assistant coach(es)

- Jackie Moore (Armstrong State)
- Angie Nelp (Colorado State)
- Nikki Blue (UCLA)

Legend

- (C) Team captain
- (S) Suspended
- (I) Ineligible
- (W) Walk-on
- Injured
- Current redshirt

Roster

== Schedule ==
Date time, TV	Rank^{#}	Opponent^{#}	Result	Record	High points	High rebounds	High assists	Site (attendance) city, state
Regular season
November 25, 2020*; 4:00 pm, ASU Live Stream – 2		Stephen F. Austin	W 56–47	1–0	14 – Hanson	12 – Walker	– Walker	Desert Financial Arena; Tempe, AZ
November 27, 2020*; 4:00 pm, ASU Live Steam – 2		VCU	W 49–40	2–0	13 – Walker	13 – Walker	4 – Mbulito	Desert Financial Arena; Tempe, AZ
November 30, 2020*; 4:00 pm, ASU Live Steam – 2		Saint Mary's	W 62–53	3–0	9 – Tied	4 – Tied	4 – Mbulito	Desert Financial Arena; Tempe, AZ
December 4, 2020; 5:00 pm, P12N		USC	W 63–58	4–0 (1–0)	20 – Simmons	8 – Sanders	4 – Mbulito	Desert Financial Arena; Tempe, AZ
December 6, 2020; 2:00 pm, P12N		No. 9 UCLA	L 59–63	4–1 (1–1)	12 – Walker	6 – Besselink	4 – Caldwell	Desert Financial Arena; Tempe, AZ
December 10, 2020; 4:00 pm, P12N		at No. 6 Arizona	L 37–65	4–2 (1–2)	14 – Hanson	9 – Walker	2 – Tied	McKale Center; Tucson, AZ
December 13, 2020*; 2:00 pm, ASU Live Stream – 2		San Diego	W 64–55	5–2	16 – Simmons	9 – Walker	5 – Simmons	Desert Financial Arena; Tempe, AZ
December 18, 2020; 3:00 pm, P12N		at Utah	W 56–48	6–2 (2–2)	15 – Hanson	8 – Besselink	2 – Hanson	Jon M. Huntsman Center; Salt Lake City, UT
December 20, 2021; 2:00 pm, P12N		at Colorado	Postponed					CU Events Center; Boulder, CO
January 1, 2021; 6:30 pm, P12N		California	W 56–53	7–2 (3–2)	21 – Hanson	8 – Levings	7 – Simmons	Desert Financial Arena; Tempe, AZ
January 3, 2021; 4:00 pm, P12N		No. 1 Stanford	L 60–68	7–3 (3–3)	16 – Simmons	7 – Besselink	2 – Hanson	Desert Financial Arena; Tempe, AZ
January 8, 2021; 5:00 pm, P12N		at Washington State	Postponed					Beasley Coliseum; Pullman, WA
January 10, 2021; 2:00 pm, P12N		at Washington	Postponed					Hec Edmundson Pavilion; Seattle, WA
January 15, 2021; 5:30 pm, P12N		Oregon State	Postponed					Desert Financial Arena; Tempe, AZ
January 17, 2021; 12:00 pm, P12N		No. 10 Oregon	Postponed					Desert Financial Arena; Tempe, AZ
January 22, 2021; 3:00 pm, P12N		Colorado	W 51–47	8–3 (4–3)	16 – Hanson	6 – Tied	4 – Loera	Desert Financial Arena; Tempe, AZ
January 24, 2021; 2:00 pm, ASU Live Stream		Utah	L 51–65	8–4 (4–4)	13 – Simmons	6 – Tied	4 – Sanders	Desert Financial Arena; Tempe, AZ
January 29, 2021; 7:00 pm, P12N		No. 5 UCLA	L 57–60	8–5 (4–5)	12 – Hanson	9 – Greenslade	3 – Simmons	Desert Financial Arena; Tempe, AZ
January 31, 2021; 2:00 pm, USC Live Stream		USC	L 57–65	8–6 (4–6)	16 – Simmons	8 – Besselink	4 – Mbulito	Desert Financial Arena; Tempe, AZ
February 5, 2021; 9:00 pm, P12N		at No. 12 Oregon	Postponed					Matthew Knight Arena; Eugene, OR
February 7, 2021; 1:00 pm, P12N		at Oregon State	Postponed					Gill Coliseum; Corvallis, OR
February 8, 2021; 4:00 pm, ASU Live Stream		Southern Utah	W 55–44	9–6	15 – Hanson	7 – Walker	4 – Simmons	Desert Financial Arena; Tempe, AZ
February 12, 2021; 5:00 pm, P12N		Washington	L 35–50	9–7 (4–7)	11 – Hanson	7 – Hanson	3 – Tied	Desert Financial Arena; Tempe, AZ
February 14, 2021; 12:30 pm, P12N		Washington State	W 67–61	10–7 (5–7)	15 – Simmons	6 – Levings	4 – Simmons	Desert Financial Arena; Tempe, AZ
February 19, 2021; 7:00 pm, P12N		at No. 5 Stanford	L 41–80	10–8 (5–8)	11 – Walker	4 – Tied	3 – Tied	Maples Pavilion; Stanford, CA
February 21, 2021; 2:00 pm, P12N		California	L 55–67	10–9 (5–9)	17 – Hanson	7 – Walker	4 – Simmons	Haas Pavilion; Berkeley, CA
February 28, 2021; 12:00 pm, P12N		No. 9 Arizona	W 66–64 ^{OT}	11–9 (6–9)	19 – Hansen	13 – Besselink	4 – Mbulito	Desert Financial Arena; Tempe, AZ
Pac-12 Tournament
March 3, 2021; 3:00 pm, P12N	(9)	vs. (8) USC; First round	L 65–71	11–10	15 – Hanson	10 – Besselink	5 – Simmons	Michelob Ultra Arena; Paradise, NV
WNIT
March 19, 2021; 9:00 am, FloHoops		vs. Rice; First round	L 36–48	11–11	9 – Besselink	7 – Besselink	4 – Simmons	Wilkerson-Greines Activities Center; Fort Worth, TX
March 20, 2021; 9:00 am, FloHoops		vs. Missouri; Consolation Game	W 50–39	12–11	18 – Simmons	7 – Simmons	4 – Simmons	Wilkerson-Greines Activities Center; Fort Worth, TX
March 22, 2021; 2:00 pm, FloHoops		vs. Houston; Consolation Game	L 48–50	12–12	10 – Tied	6 – Walker	3 – Tied	Wilkerson-Greines Activities Center; Fort Worth, TX
*Non-conference game. ^{#}Rankings from AP Poll. (#) Tournament seedings in parentheses. All times are in Mountain Time.

== Rankings ==
Ranking movements Legend: — = Not ranked
	Week																				
Poll	Pre	1	2	3	4	5	6	7	8	9	10	11	12	13	14	15	16	17	18	19	Final
AP	—	—	—	—	—	—	—	—	—	—	—	—	—	—	—	—	—				
Coaches	—	—	—	—	—	—	—	—	—	—	—	—	—	—	—	—	—	—			

*AP does not release post-NCAA Tournament rankings.
^Coaches did not release a Week 1 poll.

== See also ==
- 2020–21 Arizona State Sun Devils men's basketball team
