= McDermott =

McDermott or MacDermott is an Irish surname and the anglicised version of Mac Diarmada (also spelled Mac Diarmata), the surname of the ruling dynasty of Moylurg, a kingdom that existed in Connacht from the 10th to 16th centuries.

The last ruling king was Tadhg mac Diarmata, who ruled until 1585.

As a modern day surname, McDermott is mostly found in western Ireland and County Roscommon.

Some notable people with the surname are listed below.

== Surname ==
=== A ===
- Alan McDermott (born 1982), Irish footballer
- Alexandra Savior McDermott (born 1995), American singer-songwriter
- Alice McDermott (born 1953), American writer
- Alister McDermott (born 1991), Australian cricketer
- Allan Langdon McDermott (1854–1908), American politician
- Andrew McDermott (disambiguation), multiple people
- Ann McDermott, American biophysicist
- Anne-Marie McDermott, American pianist
- Ardal McDermott, Irish hurler

=== B ===
- Barrie McDermott (born 1972), English rugby union footballer
- Ben McDermott (born 1994), Australian cricketer
- Beverly McDermott (1926–2012), American director
- Bill McDermott (born 1961), American business executive
- Bob McDermott (born 1963), American politician
- Bobby McDermott (1914–1963), American basketball player
- Bosco McDermott (born 1936), Irish sportsperson
- Brett McDermott, English mixed martial artist
- Brian McDermott (disambiguation), multiple people

=== C ===
- Catherine McDermott, British professor
- Charles McDermott (disambiguation), multiple people
- Chayce McDermott (born 1998), American baseball player
- Chris McDermott (born 1963), Australian rules footballer
- Christopher McDermott (born 1989), British handball player and coach
- Clancy McDermott (1920–2007), Northern Irish footballer
- Conor McDermott (born 1992), American football player
- Cormac MacDermott (? – 1618), one of the best-known Irish harpers at the Jacobean court
- Craig McDermott (born 1965), Australian cricketer

=== D ===
- Darren McDermott (born 1978), English boxer
- Dave McDermott (born 1974), American artist
- David McDermott (born 1988), English footballer
- Dean McDermott (born 1966), Canadian-American actor
- Dennis McDermott (1922–2003), Canadian trade unionist
- Don McDermott (1929–2020), American speed skater
- Donal McDermott (born 1989), Irish footballer
- Doug McDermott (born 1992), American basketball player
- Drew McDermott (1949–2022), American computer scientist
- Dylan McDermott (born 1961), American actor

=== E ===
- Edward J. McDermott (1952–1926), American politician
- Elizabeth McDermott, British professor
- Emmet McDermott (1911–2002), Australian politician and dentist
- Enda McDermott (born 1945), Irish cricketer
- Eoghan McDermott (born 1983), Irish television presenter
- Erica McDermott (born 1973), American actress
- Eugene McDermott (1899–1973), American geophysicist

=== F ===
- Fran McDermott (born 1960), American football player
- Francis McDermott (1874–1957), Australian politician
- Frank McDermott (disambiguation), multiple people

=== G ===
- Gary McDermott (born 1946), American football player
- George Thomas McDermott (1886–1937), American judge
- Gerald McDermott (1941–2012), American filmmaker
- Gertrude McDermott (1846–1940), American teacher and religious figure
- Greg McDermott (born 1964), American basketball coach
- Gregory McDermott (born 1958), Australian equestrian

=== H ===
- Helen McDermott (born 1954), British radio and television presenter
- Hugh McDermott (disambiguation), multiple people

=== J ===
- Jack McDermott (1906–1958), Irish trade unionist
- James McDermott (disambiguation), multiple people
- Jerry McDermott, American police officer
- J. M. McDermott, American writer
- John McDermott (disambiguation), multiple people
- Joseph McDermott (disambiguation), multiple people
- Josie McDermott (1925–1992), Irish musician

=== K ===
- Kathleen McDermott (born 1977), Scottish actress
- Kathleen McDermott (psychologist), American psychologist
- K. C. McDermott (born 1996), American football player
- Keith McDermott (born 1953), American actor
- Kevin McDermott (disambiguation), multiple people
- Kirstyn McDermott, Australian writer

=== L ===
- Lee McDermott (gymnast) (born 1974), British gymnast
- Luke McDermott (born 1987), American ice sled hockey player
- Lloyd McDermott (1939–2019), Australian rugby union footballer

=== M ===
- Marc McDermott (1871–1929), Australian actor
- Marcia McDermott (born 1965), American soccer coach
- Mark McDermott (born 1971), Irish rugby union footballer
- Martin McDermott, Irish Gaelic footballer and manager
- Mary McDermott (fl. 1832), Irish poet
- Mary M. McDermott, American professor
- Matthew McDermott (born 1977), American judge
- Maurice McDermott (footballer) (1923–1988), English footballer
- Melissa McDermott, American news anchor and reporter
- Michael McDermott (disambiguation), multiple people
- Mick McDermott (born 1974), Northern Irish footballer
- Mickey McDermott (1929–2003), American baseball player
- Mike McDermott (disambiguation), multiple people
- Murray McDermott (1950–2003), Scottish footballer

=== N ===
- Neale McDermott (born 1985), English footballer
- Neil McDermott (born 1980), British actor
- Nicola McDermott (born 1996), Australian high jumper
- Nora McDermott (1927–2013), Canadian basketball and volleyball player
- Norm McDermott (1913–1987), Australian rules footballer

=== P ===
- Patrick McDermott, American cameraman who disappeared in June 2005
- Patrick McDermott (politician) (1859–1942), Irish nationalist politician
- Paul McDermott (disambiguation), multiple people
- Peter McDermott (disambiguation), multiple people
- Phelim McDermott (born 1963), English actor and stage director
- Phil McDermott, British actor

=== R ===
- Red McDermott (1888–1964), American baseball player
- Robert McDermott (disambiguation), multiple people
- Rose McDermott, American professor

=== S ===
- Sandy McDermott (1856–1922), American baseball player
- Sean McDermott (disambiguation), multiple people
- Shane McDermott (born 1992), American football player
- Stephen McDermott, Irish footballer
- Steve McDermott (footballer) (born 1964), English footballer
- Steve McDermott (speedway rider)

=== T ===
- Tate McDermott (born 1998), Australian rugby union footballer
- Terry McDermott (disambiguation), multiple people
- Thomas McDermott (disambiguation), multiple people
- Todd McDermott (born 1966), American journalist
- Townsend McDermott (1818–1907), Australian politician
- Tracey McDermott, British civil servant
- Dermot mac Tadhg Mor, 7th King of Moylurg (1124-1159)

=== U ===
- Ufuoma McDermott (born 1981), Nigerian filmmaker

=== V ===
- Vincent McDermott (1933–2016), American composer

=== W ===
- Walsh McDermott (1909–1981), American physician
- William McDermott (1930–2013), Irish-Peruvian Roman Catholic bishop

=== Z ===
- Zara McDermott (born 1996), English media personality

== See also ==
- McDermott Field, a baseball stadium in Idaho that was replaced by Melaleuca Field
- MacDermot
- MacDermott (disambiguation)
- MacDiarmid
