= 2020–21 Atlantic Coast Conference women's basketball season =

- League: NCAA Division I
- Sport: Basketball
- Teams: 15
- TV partner(s): ACC Network, ESPN, Regional Sports Networks

WNBA Draft
- Top draft pick: Stephanie Watts, North Carolina
- Picked by: Los Angeles Sparks, 10th overall

2020–21 NCAA Division I women's basketball season
- Regular season Champions: Louisville
- Runners-up: NC State
- Season MVP: Dana Evans – Louisville
- Top scorer: Dana Evans – 21.4 ppg

ACC Tournament
- Champions: NC State
- Finals MVP: Elissa Cunane – NC State

Atlantic Coast Conference women's basketball seasons
- ← 2019–20 2021–22 →

2020–21 ACC women's basketball standings
	Conf.				Overall
Team	W		L	PCT	W		L	PCT
No. 8 Louisville	14	–	2	.875	26	–	4	.867
No. 3 NC State†	12	–	2	.857	22	–	3	.880
Georgia Tech	12	–	6	.667	17	–	9	.654
Syracuse	9	–	7	.563	15	–	9	.625
Florida State	9	–	7	.563	10	–	9	.526
Notre Dame	8	–	7	.533	10	–	10	.500
Virginia Tech	8	–	8	.500	15	–	10	.600
North Carolina	8	–	9	.471	13	–	11	.542
Miami (FL)	8	–	10	.444	11	–	11	.500
Wake Forest	8	–	10	.444	12	–	13	.480
Clemson	5	–	12	.294	12	–	14	.462
Pittsburgh	3	–	12	.200	5	–	14	.263
Boston College	2	–	11	.154	7	–	12	.368
Duke	0	–	1	.000	3	–	1	.750
Virginia	0	–	2	.000	0	–	5	.000
† 2021 ACC tournament winner Duke suspended their season on December 25, 2020; Virginia suspended their season on January 14, 2021; As of March 30, 2021; Rankings from AP poll

The 2020–21 Atlantic Coast Conference women's basketball season began with practices in November 2020, followed by the start of the 2020–21 NCAA Division I women's basketball season in November. Conference play started in December 2020 and will conclude in March with the 2021 ACC women's basketball tournament at the Greensboro Coliseum in Greensboro, NC.

== Head coaches ==
=== Coaching changes ===
- On July 2, 2020 Duke announced that head coach Joanne McCallie had retired after thirteen years as head coach. On July 11, 2020, Kara Lawson was announced as the new head coach.
- On April 22, 2020 Muffet McGraw announced she would be retiring as head coach at Notre Dame after thirty three years in charge. On the same day, Niele Ivey was announced as her replacement.

=== Coaches ===
Team	Head coach	Previous job	Years at school	Record at school	ACC record	ACC titles	NCAA tournaments	NCAA Final Fours	NCAA Championships
Boston College	Joanna Bernabei-McNamee	Albany	3	34–28	14–20	0	0	0	0
Clemson	Amanda Butler	Florida	3	28–36	12–22	0	1	0	0
Duke	Kara Lawson	Boston Celtics (Assistant)	1	0–0	0–0	0	0	0	0
Florida State	Sue Semrau	Wisconsin (Assistant)	24	475–257	207–151	2	15	0	0
Georgia Tech	Nell Fortner	Auburn	2	20–11	10–8	0	0	0	0
Louisville	Jeff Walz	Maryland (Assistant)	14	360–103	161–52	1	5	3	0
Miami	Katie Meier	Charlotte	16	292–187	118–114	1	8	0	0
NC State	Wes Moore	Chattanooga	8	167–61	77–37	1	4	0	0
North Carolina	Courtney Banghart	Princeton	2	16–14	7–11	0	0	0	0
Notre Dame	Niele Ivey	Memphis Grizzlies (Assistant)	1	0–0	0–0	0	0	0	0
Pittsburgh	Lance White	Florida State (Assistant)	3	16–46	3–31	0	0	0	0
Syracuse	Quentin Hillsman	Syracuse (Assistant)	14	158–72	75–49	0	6	1	0
Virginia	Tina Thompson	Texas (Associate Head Coach)	3	25–36	13–21	0	0	0	0
Virginia Tech	Kenny Brooks	James Madison	5	86–49	27–39	0	0	0	0
Wake Forest	Jennifer Hoover	High Point	9	114–140	37–95	0	0	0	0

Notes:

- Year at school includes 2020–21 season.
- Overall and ACC records are from time at current school and are through the end the 2019–20 season.
- NCAA tournament appearances are from time at current school only.
- NCAA Final Fours and Championship include time at other schools

== Preseason ==
=== Preseason watch lists ===
Below is a table of notable preseason watch lists.

Lieberman	Drysdale	Miller	McClain	Leslie	Naismith	Wooden
Tiana England–Florida State; Hailey Van Lith – Louisville; Raina Perez – NC State; Tiana Mangakahia – Syracuse	Dana Evans – Louisville; Jakia Brown-Turner – NC State; Kiara Lewis – Syracuse	Taylor Soule – Boston College; Elizabeth Balogun – Louisville; Ivana Raca – Wake Forest	Sam Brunelle – Notre Dame	Jade Williams – Duke; Elissa Cunane – NC State; Janelle Bailey – North Carolina; Kamilla Cardoso – Syracuse; Elizabeth Kitley – Virginia Tech	Sam Brunelle – Notre Dame; Elissa Cunane – NC State; Dana Evans – Louisville; Kiara Lewis – Syracuse; Tiana Mangakahia – Syracuse; Taylor Soule – Boston College; Hailey Van Lith – Louisville	Elissa Cunane – NC State; Dana Evans – Louisville; Kiara Lewis – Syracuse; Tiana Mangakahia – Syracuse

=== ACC Women's Basketball Tip-off ===
Prior to the start of the season, the ACC hosted two media days virtually. At the media day, the head coaches voted on the finishing order of the teams, an All-ACC team, a Preseason Player of the Year, and Newcomers to watch. The media day was hosted on November 11&12, 2020. A selected group of student athletes also took questions from the media on this day.

At the media day, both the head coaches and the Blue Ribbon Panel predicted that Louisville would be league champion.

==== ACC preseason polls ====
First place votes shown in parentheses.

2020 ACC Women's Basketball Preseason Polls
Head coaches	Blue Ribbon Panel
1. Louisville (13) – 223; 2. NC State (2) – 210; 3. Syracuse – 193; 4. North Carolina – 157; 5. Georgia Tech – 146; 6. Notre Dame – 138; 7. Virginia Tech – 125; 8. Florida State – 124; 9. Boston College – 120; 10. Miami – 99; 11. Duke – 74; 12. Wake Forest – 73; 13. Clemson – 56; 14. Pitt – 37; 15. Virginia – 25	1. Louisville (45) – 840; 2. NC State (10) – 797; 3. Syracuse (2) – 724; 4. Notre Dame – 555; 5. North Carolina – 547; 6. Florida State – 516; 7. Virginia Tech – 482; 8. Boston College – 468; 9. Georgia Tech – 452; 10. Duke – 385; 11. Miami – 359; 12. Wake Forest – 258; 13. Clemson – 183; 14. Virginia – 149; 15. Pitt – 125

==== Preseason All-ACC Teams ====
2020 ACC Women's Basketball Preseason All-ACC Teams
Head coaches	Blue Ribbon Panel
Taylor Soule – Boston College; Dana Evans – Louisville; Janelle Bailey – North Carolina; Jakia Brown-Turner – NC State; Elissa Cunane – NC State; Kiara Lewis – Syracuse; Tiana Mangakahia – Syracuse; Elizabeth Kitley – Virginia Tech; Aisha Sheppard – Virginia Tech; Ivana Raca – Wake Forest	Taylor Soule – Boston College; Dana Evans – Louisville; Janelle Bailey – North Carolina; Elissa Cunane – NC State; Sam Brunelle – Notre Dame; Kiara Lewis – Syracuse; Tiana Mangakahia – Syracuse; Elizabeth Kitley – Virginia Tech; Aisha Sheppard – Virginia Tech; Ivana Raca – Wake Forest

==== Preseason ACC Player of the Year ====
2020 ACC Women's Basketball Preseason Player of the Year
Head coaches	Blue Ribbon Panel
Dana Evans – Louisville

==== Newcomer Watchlist ====
2020 ACC Women's Basketball Newcomer Watchlists
Head coaches	Blue Ribbon Panel
Hailey Van Lith – Louisville; Kianna Smith – Louisville; Deja Kelly – North Carolina; Maddy Westbeld – Notre Dame; Kamilla Cardoso – Syracuse	Tiana England – Florida State; Hailey Van Lith – Louisville; Deja Kelly – North Carolina; Maddy Westbeld – Notre Dame; Kamilla Cardoso – Syracuse

== Regular season ==
=== Records against other conferences ===
2020–21 records against non-conference foes as of (March 30, 2021):

Regular season

Power 7 Conferences	Record
American	2–2
Big East	2–0
Big Ten	1–1
Big 12	0–0
Pac-12	0–0
SEC	2–2
Power 7 Conferences Total	7–5
Other NCAA Division 1 Conferences	Record
America East	3–0
A-10	5–0
ASUN	5–0
Big Sky	0–0
Big South	5–0
Big West	0–0
CAA	3–2
C-USA	4–0
Horizon	2–0
Ivy League	0–0
MAAC	0–0
MAC	1–1
MEAC	2–0
MVC	1–0
Mountain West	0–0
NEC	0–0
OVC	4–0
Patriot League	0–0
SoCon	4–0
Southland	0–0
SWAC	0–0
Summit	0–0
Sun Belt	3–0
WAC	0–0
WCC	0–0
Other Division I Total	42–3
Division II Total	1–0
NCAA Division I Total	49–8

Post Season

Power 7 Conferences	Record
American	1–0
Big East	1–1
Big Ten	1–1
Big 12	1–2
Pac-12	1–2
SEC	0–2
Power 7 Conferences Total	5–8
Other NCAA Division 1 Conferences	Record
America East	0–0
A-10	0–0
ASUN	0–0
Big Sky	0–0
Big South	0–0
Big West	0–0
CAA	0–1
C-USA	0–0
Horizon	0–0
Ivy League	0–0
MAAC	2–0
MAC	1–0
MEAC	0–0
MVC	0–0
Mountain West	0–0
NEC	0–0
OVC	0–0
Patriot League	0–0
SoCon	0–0
Southland	1–0
SWAC	0–0
Summit	1–0
Sun Belt	0–0
WAC	0–0
WCC	0–0
Other Division I Total	5–1
NCAA Division I Total	10–9

=== Record against ranked non-conference opponents ===
This is a list of games against ranked opponents only (rankings from the AP Poll):

Date	Visitor	Home	Site	Significance	Score	Conference record
Nov 27	Wake Forest	No. 14 Arkansas †	Alico Arena ● Fort Myers, FL	Gulf Coast Showcase	L 82–98	0–1
Nov 29	Wake Forest	No. 24 Missouri State †	Alico Arena ● Fort Myers, FL	Gulf Coast Showcase	W 68–59	1–1
Dec 3	No. 8 NC State	No. 1 South Carolina	Colonial Life Arena ● Columbia, SC	Jimmy V Classic	W 54–46	2–1
Dec 3	No. 24 Michigan	Notre Dame	Purcell Pavilion ● Notre Dame, IN	ACC–Big Ten Women's Challenge	L 66–78	2–2
Dec 4	No. 5 Louisville	No. 20 DePaul †	Mohegan Sun Arena ● Uncasville, CT	Jimmy V Classic	W 116–75	3–2

Team rankings are reflective of AP poll when the game was played, not current or final ranking

† denotes game was played on neutral site

=== Rankings ===
Legend
Increase in ranking
Decrease in ranking
Not ranked previous week
First Place votes shown in ()

		Pre	Wk 2	Wk 3	Wk 4	Wk 5	Wk 6	Wk 7	Wk 8	Wk 9	Wk 10	Wk 11	Wk 12	Wk 13	Wk 14	Wk 15	Wk 16	Final
Boston College	AP	RV	RV	RV	RV													
Boston College	C																	
Clemson	AP																	
Clemson	C				RV	RV	RV	RV										
Duke	AP	RV	RV															
Duke	C																	
Florida State	AP	RV			RV													
Florida State	C	RV	RV	RV	RV	RV	RV	RV										
Georgia Tech	AP					RV	RV				RV	RV	RV	RV	RV	RV	RV	RV
Georgia Tech	C				RV	RV					RV	RV	RV	RV	RV	RV	RV	22
Louisville	AP	5	5	2 (2)	2 (1)	2 (1)	2 (1)	2	2	1 (20)	1 (22)	1 (26)	3	3	6	5	7т	8
Louisville	C	5	2 (6)	2 (6)	2 (1)	2 (1)	2 (1)	2 (1)	1 (30)	1 (30)	3 (5)	2 (11)	2 (8)	5	5	7	7	6
Miami	AP																	
Miami	C																	
North Carolina	AP	RV	RV	RV	RV	RV	RV	RV	RV									
North Carolina	C	RV	RV		RV	RV	RV								RV			
NC State	AP	8	8	4 (2)	4 (2)	4 (2)	3 (2)	3 (2)т	3 (1)	2 (5)	2 (5)	4	4 (1)	4	2	3	3 (2)	3 (2)
NC State	C	6	3 (1)	3	3	3	3	3	2 (1)	2 (2)	2 (7)	6	6	4	4	3	3	7
Notre Dame	AP	22	RV	RV														
Notre Dame	C	23	RV															
Pittsburgh	AP																	
Pittsburgh	C																	
Syracuse	AP	23	22	20	18	22	22	24	24	23	RV	RV	RV					
Syracuse	C	21	18	16	20т	20	20	21	20	RV	RV	RV						RV
Virginia	AP																	
Virginia	C																	
Virginia Tech	AP			RV	RV							RV	RV	RV	RV	RV	RV	RV
Virginia Tech	C	RV	RV	25т	RV	RV			RV									RV
Wake Forest	AP		RV	RV	RV	RV	RV											
Wake Forest	C			RV				RV										

Note: The Coaches Poll releases a final poll after the NCAA tournament, but the AP Poll does not release a poll at this time.

=== Conference matrix ===
This table summarizes the head-to-head results between teams in conference play. Each team played 20 conference games, and at least 1 against each opponent. This marked the first year that teams played a twenty-game conference schedule.

Duke suspended its season on December 25, 2020.
Virginia suspended its season on January 14, 2021.

	Boston College	Clemson	Duke	Florida State	Georgia Tech	Louisville	Miami	North Carolina	NC State	Notre Dame	Pittsburgh	Syracuse	Virginia	Virginia Tech	Wake Forest
vs. Boston College	–	–	–	–	86–68; 43–49	89–70; 97–68	77–60	–	75–69; 76–57	61–64; 83–73	83–80	83–70; 92–75	–	–	68–48
vs. Clemson	–	–	–	69–72; 95–88 (2OT)	67–55; 71–69	70–45	80–71; 68–62	77–64	86–65	55–78	80–71; 79–69	77–86 (OT)	55–71	70–64	66–69; 72–65
vs. Duke	–	–	–	–	–	73–49	–	–	–	–	–	–	–	–	–
vs. Florida State	–	72–69; 88–95 (2OT)	–	–	66–58; 62–48	84–56; 59–68	68–53; 59–67	51–61	–	72–64	53–67	52–67	51–69	63–73	73–59; 51–59
vs. Georgia Tech	68–86; 49–43	55–67; 69–71	–	58–66; 48–62	–	85–70	56–70; 56–67	84–59	84–75	67–82; 69–67	60–65	63–76	–	54–56	44–73; 61–52
vs. Louisville	70–89; 68–97	45–70	49–73	56–84; 68–59	70–85	–	76–79	68–79	74–60	65–71; 61–78	58–82	54–67	–	67–71	63–65
vs. Miami	60–77	71–80; 62–68	–	53–68; 67–59	70–56; 67–56	79–76	–	63–67; 59–69	87–47	71–60	68–72	69–58; 99–64	–	75–55	63–60; 67–69
vs. North Carolina	–	64–77	–	61–51	59–84	79–68	67–63; 69–59	–	69–76; 82–63	73–78	72–81	68–92; 88–76	–	66–54; 73–69; 63–68	57–54; 74–77 (OT)
vs. NC State	69–75; 57–76	65–86	–	–	75–84	60–74	47–78	76–69; 63–82	–	–	53–83	61–68	–	87–89; 83–71 (OT)	65–79; 47–66
vs. Notre Dame	64–61; 73–83	78–55	–	64–72	82–67; 67–69	71–65; 78–61	60–71	78–73	–	–	48–59	81–69	–	78–84; 60–65	72–79
vs. Pittsburgh	80–83	71–80; 69–79	–	67–53	65–60	82–58	72–68	81–72	83–53	59–48	–	80–57; 71–67	–	88–71; 74–55	64–61 (OT)
vs. Syracuse	70–83; 75–92	86–77 (OT)	–	67–52	76–63	67–54	58–69; 64–99	92–68; 76–88	68–61	69–81	57–80; 67–71	–	–	76–68	78–85
vs. Virginia	–	71–55	–	69–51	–	–	–	–	–	–	–	–	–	–	–
vs. Virginia Tech	–	64–70	–	73–63	56–54	71–67	55–75	54–66; 69–73; 68–63	89–87; 71–83 (OT)	84–78; 65–60	71–88; 55–74	68–76	–	–	67–64
vs. Wake Forest	48–68	69–66; 65–72	–	59–73; 59–51	73–44; 52–61	65–63	60–63; 69–67	54–57; 77–74 (OT)	79–65; 66–47	79–72	61–64 (OT)	85–78	–	64–67	–
Total	2–11	5–12	0–1	9–7	12–6	14–2	8–10	8–9	12–2	8–7	3–12	9–7	0–2	8–8	8–10

=== Player of the week ===
Throughout the conference regular season, the Atlantic Coast Conference offices named a Player(s) of the week and a Rookie(s) of the week.

Week	Player of the week	Freshman of the week	Reference
Week 1 – Nov 30	Taylor Soule – Boston College	Hailey Van Lith – Louisville	
Week 2 – Dec 7	Kayla Jones – NC State	Maddy Westbeld – Notre Dame	
Week 3 – Dec 14	Lotta-Maj Lahtinen – Georgia Tech	Loyal McQueen – Georgia Tech	
Week 4 – Dec 21	Janelle Bailey – North Carolina	Gabby Elliott – Clemson	
Week 5 – Jan 4	Jada Boyd – NC State	Maddy Westbeld (2) – Notre Dame	
Week 6 – Jan 11	Ivana Raca – Wake Forest	Hailey Van Lith (2) – Louisville	
Week 7 – Jan 18	Elizabeth Kitley – Virginia Tech	Priscilla Williams – Syracuse	
Week 7 – Jan 18	Gina Conti – Wake Forest	Priscilla Williams – Syracuse	
Week 8 – Jan 25	Dana Evans – Louisville	Kamilla Cardoso – Syracuse	
Week 9 – Feb 1	Aisha Sheppard – Virginia Tech	Kamilla Cardoso (2) – Syracuse	
Week 10 – Feb 8	Dana Evans (2) – Louisville	Kamilla Cardoso (3) – Syracuse	
Week 11 – Feb 15	Gina Conti (2) – Wake Forest	Georgia Amoore – Virginia Tech	
Week 12 – Feb 22	Jakia Brown-Turner – NC State	Deja Kelly – North Carolina	
Week 13 – Mar 1	Destiny Harden – Miami	Deja Kelly (2) – North Carolina	

== Postseason ==
=== ACC tournament ===
First round
12	Pittsburgh	56
13	Boston College	67

Second round
8	North Carolina	71
9	Wake Forest	82
5	Syracuse	67
13	Boston College	61
7	Virginia Tech	72
10	Miami	64
6	Notre Dame	63
11	Clemson	68

Quarterfinals
1	Louisville	65
9	Wake Forest	53
4	Florida State	67
5	Syracuse	68
2	NC State	68
7	Virginia Tech	55
3	Georgia Tech	60
11	Clemson	57

Semifinals
1	Louisville	72
5	Syracuse	59
2	NC State	66
3	Georgia Tech	61

Championship
1	Louisville	56
2	NC State	58

=== NCAA tournament ===
Seed	Region	School	1st Round	2nd Round	Sweet 16	Elite Eight	Final Four	Championship
1	Mercado	NC State	W 79–58 vs. #16 North Carolina A&T – (San Marcos, TX)	W 79–67 vs. #8 South Florida – (San Antonio, TX)	L 70–73 vs. #4 Indiana – (San Antonio, TX)			
2	Alamo	Louisville	W 74–43 vs. #15 Marist – (San Antonio, TX)	W 62–53 vs. #7 Northwestern – (San Antonio, TX)	W 60–42 vs. #6 Oregon – (San Antonio, TX)	L 63–78 vs. #1 Stanford – (San Antonio, TX)		
5	HemisFair	Georgia Tech	W 54–52 (OT) vs. #12 Stephen F. Austin – (San Antonio, TX)	W 73–56 vs. #4 West Virginia – (San Antonio, TX)	L 65–76 vs. #1 South Carolina – (San Antonio, TX)			
7	Riverwalk	Virginia Tech	W 70–63 vs. #10 Marquette – (San Marcos, TX)	L 48–90 vs. #2 Baylor – (San Antonio, TX)				
8	Riverwalk	Syracuse	W 72–55 vs. #9 South Dakota State – (Austin, TX)	L 47–83 vs. #1 UConn – (San Antonio, TX)				
9	HemisFair	Florida State	L 59–83 vs. #8 Oregon State – (San Marcos, TX)					
9	Alamo	Wake Forest	L 61–84 vs. #8 Oklahoma State – (San Antonio, TX)					
10	HemisFair	North Carolina	L 71–80 vs. #7 Alabama – (San Antonio, TX)					
		W–L (%):	5–3 (.625)	3–2 (.600)	1–2 (.333)	0–1 (.000)	0–0 (–)	0–0 (–) Total: 9–8 (.529)

=== National Invitation tournament ===
Bracket	School	First Round	Second Round	Quarterfinals	Semifinals	Championship
Charlotte	Clemson	W 65–60 vs. Ohio – (Charlotte, NC)	L 74–87 vs. Delaware – (Charlotte, NC)			
	W–L (%):	1–0 (1.000)	0–1 (.000)	0–0 (–)	0–0 (–)	0–0 (–) Total: 1–1 (.500)

== Honors and awards ==
=== ACC Awards ===
The ACC announced its end of season awards on March 2, 2021 ahead of the start of the ACC tournament.

2020 ACC Women's Basketball Individual Awards
Award	Recipient(s)
Player of the Year	Dana Evans – Louisville
Coach of the Year	Nell Fortner – Georgia Tech (Blue Ribbon); Wes Moore – NC State (Head Coaches)
Defensive Player of the Year	Lorela Cubaj – Georgia Tech; Kamilla Cardoso – Syracuse
Freshman of the Year	Kamilla Cardoso – Syracuse (Blue Ribbon); Maddy Westbeld – Notre Dame (Head Coaches)
Sixth Player of the Year	Jada Boyd – NC State; Emily Engstler – Syracuse
Most Improved Player	Lotta-Maj Lahtinen – Georgia Tech

2020 ACC Women's Basketball All-Conference Teams (Blue Ribbon Panel)
First Team	Second Team	Honorable Mention	Freshman Team
Lorela Cubaj – Georgia Tech; Lotta-Maj Lahtinen – Georgia Tech; Dana Evans – Louisville; Elissa Cunane – NC State; Jakia Brown-Turner – NC State; Maddy Westbeld – Notre Dame; Kamilla Cardoso – Syracuse; Elizabeth Kitley – Virginia Tech; Aisha Sheppard – Virginia Tech; Ivana Raca – Wake Forest	Taylor Soule – Boston College; Delicia Washington – Clemson; Morgan Jones – Florida State; Kayla Jones – NC State; Gina Conti – Wake Forest	Janelle Bailey – North Carolina; Raina Perez – NC State; Jayla Everett – Pittsburgh; Kiara Lewis – Syracuse; Tiana Mangakahia – Syracuse	Gabby Elliott – Clemson; Hailey Van Lith – Louisville; Olivia Cochran – Louisville; Deja Kelly – North Carolina; Maddy Westbeld – Notre Dame; Kamilla Cardoso – Syracuse; Georgia Amoore – Virginia Tech; Jewel Spear – Wake Forest

2020 ACC Women's Basketball All-Conference Teams (Head Coaches)
First Team	Second Team	Honorable Mention	Freshman Team
Taylor Soule – Boston College; Morgan Jones – Florida State; Lorela Cubaj – Georgia Tech; Dana Evans – Louisville; Jakia Brown-Turner – NC State; Elissa Cunane – NC State; Kayla Jones – NC State; Elizabeth Kitley – Virginia Tech; Aisha Sheppard – Virginia Tech; Ivana Raca – Wake Forest	Delicia Washington – Clemson; Lotta-Maj Lahtinen – Georgia Tech; Maddy Westbeld – Notre Dame; Kamilla Cardoso – Syracuse; Gina Conti – Wake Forest	Janelle Bailey – North Carolina; Jayla Everett – Pittsburgh; Tiana Mangakahia – Syracuse	Gabby Elliott – Clemson; Hailey Van Lith – Louisville; Olivia Cochran – Louisville; Deja Kelly – North Carolina; Maddy Westbeld – Notre Dame; Kamilla Cardoso – Syracuse; Georgia Amoore – Virginia Tech; Jewel Spear – Wake Forest

2020 ACC Women's Basketball All-ACC Defensive Team
Player	Team
Marnell Garraud	Boston College
Lorela Cubaj	Georgia Tech
Morgan Jones	Florida State
Mykasa Robinson	Louisville
Kamilla Cardoso	Syracuse

== WNBA draft ==
The ACC had three players selected in the 2021 WNBA Draft. The ACC has had at least one player selected in sixteen straight WNBA Drafts.

Player	Team	Round	Pick #	Position	School
Stephanie Watts	Los Angeles Sparks	1	10	Guard	North Carolina
Dana Evans	Dallas Wings	2	13	Guard	Louisville
Ivana Raca	Los Angeles Sparks	3	28	Guard	Wake Forest
