= Steve McDermott =

Steve McDermott may refer to:

- Steve McDermott (footballer), English footballer
- Steve McDermott (speedway rider)
- Stephen McDermott, Irish footballer
