= 2020–21 NC State Wolfpack women's basketball team =

Intercollegiate basketball season

2020–21 NC State Wolfpack women's basketball

ACC tournament champions

NCAA tournament, Sweet Sixteen
- Conference: Atlantic Coast Conference

Ranking
- Coaches: No. 7
- AP: No. 3
- Record: 22–3 (12–2 ACC)
- Head coach: Wes Moore (8th season)
- Assistant coaches: Lindsay Edmonds; Erin Batth; Nikki West
- Home arena: Reynolds Coliseum

2020–21 ACC women's basketball standings
	Conf.				Overall
Team	W		L	PCT	W		L	PCT
No. 8 Louisville	14	–	2	.875	26	–	4	.867
No. 3 NC State†	12	–	2	.857	22	–	3	.880
Georgia Tech	12	–	6	.667	17	–	9	.654
Syracuse	9	–	7	.563	15	–	9	.625
Florida State	9	–	7	.563	10	–	9	.526
Notre Dame	8	–	7	.533	10	–	10	.500
Virginia Tech	8	–	8	.500	15	–	10	.600
North Carolina	8	–	9	.471	13	–	11	.542
Miami (FL)	8	–	10	.444	11	–	11	.500
Wake Forest	8	–	10	.444	12	–	13	.480
Clemson	5	–	12	.294	12	–	14	.462
Pittsburgh	3	–	12	.200	5	–	14	.263
Boston College	2	–	11	.154	7	–	12	.368
Duke	0	–	1	.000	3	–	1	.750
Virginia	0	–	2	.000	0	–	5	.000
† 2021 ACC tournament winner Duke suspended their season on December 25, 2020; Virginia suspended their season on January 14, 2021; As of March 30, 2021; Rankings from AP poll

The 2020–21 NC State Wolfpack women's basketball team represented North Carolina State University during the 2020–21 NCAA Division I women's basketball season. The Wolfpack were led by eighth-year head coach Wes Moore, and played their home games at Reynolds Coliseum as members of the Atlantic Coast Conference.

The Wolfpack finished the season 22–3 and 12–2 in ACC play to finish in second place. They won the ACC tournament, defeating Virginia Tech, Georgia Tech, and Louisville along the way to their title. It was NC State's sixth title in school history. As ACC Tournament Champions, they received an automatic bid to the NCAA tournament, where they were the one seed in the Mercado Regional. In the tournament they defeated sixteen seed North Carolina A&T in the first round and eight seed South Florida, before losing to four seed Indiana in the Sweet Sixteen to end their season.

== Previous season ==
The team finished the 2019–20 season 27–4, 14–4 in ACC play to finish in second place. They advanced to the finals of the ACC women's tournament, where they defeated Florida State to win the ACC Tournament for the first time since 1991. As winners of the conference tournament, the Wolfpack received an automatic bid to the 2020 NCAA Division I women's basketball tournament. However, due to the COVID-19 pandemic, the NCAA Tournament was canceled on March 12, 2020.

== Off-season ==
=== Departures ===
Name	Number	Pos.	Height	Year	Hometown	Reason for departure
Aislinn Konig	1	G	5'10"	Senior	Surrey, British Columbia	Graduated
Kaila Ealey	2	G	5'9"	Graduate student	Raleigh, NC	Graduated
Grace Hunter	23	G	5'10"	(redshirt) Senior	Raleigh, NC	Graduated
Erika Cassell	24	C	6'2"	Senior	Marietta, GA	Graduated
Katie Wadsworth	40	G	5'6"	Senior	Raleigh, NC	Graduated

=== Incoming transfers ===
Name	Number	Pos.	Height	Year	Hometown	Previous school
Raina Perez	2	G	5'4"	Graduate student	Goodyear, AZ	Cal State Fullerton

=== Recruiting class ===
College recruiting
Name	Hometown	School	Height	Weight	Commit date
Genesis Bryant; PG	Jonesboro, GA	Lovejoy	5 ft 8 in (1.73 m)	N/A	
Genesis Bryant; PG	Recruit ratings: ESPN: (94)				
Dontavia Waggoner; G	Nashville, TN	Ensworth	6 ft 0 in (1.83 m)	N/A	
Dontavia Waggoner; G	Recruit ratings: ESPN: (94)				
Overall recruit ranking:
Note: In many cases, Scout, Rivals, 247Sports, On3, and ESPN may conflict in their listings of height and weight.; In these cases, the average was taken. ESPN grades are on a 100-point scale.; Sources:

== Roster ==
2020–21 NC State Wolfpack women's basketball team
Players
Coaches

Pos.	#	Name	Height	Year	Previous school	Hometown
G	0	Rebecca Demeke	6 ft 0 in (1.83 m)	Fr	Crestwood Prep	Toronto, ON
G	1	Genesis Bryant	5 ft 6 in (1.68 m)	Fr	Lovejoy	Jonesboro, GA
G	2	Raina Perez	5 ft 4 in (1.63 m)	GS	Millennium; Cal State Fullerton	Goodyear, AZ
G	3	Kai Crutchfield	5 ft 9 in (1.75 m)	Sr	Millbrook	Raleigh, NC
G	5	Jada Boyd	6 ft 2 in (1.88 m)	So	Appomattox County	Petersburg, VA
G	11	Jakia Brown-Turner	6 ft 0 in (1.83 m)	So	Bishop McNamara	Temple Hills, MD
G	15	Kendal Moore	5 ft 6 in (1.68 m)	So	Pine Forest	Fayetteville, NC
F	20	Elle Sutphin	6 ft 3 in (1.91 m)	RS Fr	East Surry	Pilot Mountain, NC
G	24	Dontavia Waggoner	6 ft 0 in (1.83 m)	Fr	Ensworth	Nashville, TN
F	25	Kayla Jones	6 ft 1 in (1.85 m)	Sr	Riverside	Jamesville, NC
F	31	Jada Rice	6 ft 4 in (1.93 m)	RS So	Collins Hill	Suwanee, GA
C	33	Elissa Cunane	6 ft 5 in (1.96 m)	Jr	Northern Guilford	Summerfield, NC
C	41	Camille Hobby	6 ft 1 in (1.85 m)	So	Nease	Ponte Vedra Beach, FL

Head coach

- Wes Moore (NC State)

Assistant coach(es)

- Lindsay Edmonds (Appalachian State)
- Erin Batth (Clemson)
- Kikki West (Clemson)

Legend

- (C) Team captain
- (S) Suspended
- (I) Ineligible
- (W) Walk-on
- Injured
- Current redshirt

Roster
Last update: December 2, 2020

== Schedule ==
Date time, TV	Rank^{#}	Opponent^{#}	Result	Record	Site (attendance) city, state
Non-conference regular season
November 25, 2020*; 2:00 p.m., ACCNX	No. 8	North Florida	W 93–65	1–0	Reynolds Coliseum (25); Raleigh, NC
November 29, 2020*; 2:00 p.m., ACCNX	No. 8	NC Central	W 108–70	2–0	Reynolds Coliseum (25); Raleigh, NC
December 3, 2020*; 7:00 p.m., ESPN2	No. 8	at No. 1 South Carolina; Jimmy V Classic	W 54–46	3–0	Colonial Life Arena (3,500); Columbia, SC
December 6, 2020*; 2:00 p.m., ACCNX	No. 8	Coastal Carolina	W 98–46	4–0	Reynolds Coliseum (25); Raleigh, NC
December 9, 2020*; 7:15 p.m., ACCN	No. 4	Elon	W 76–47	5–0	Reynolds Coliseum (25); Raleigh, NC
ACC regular season
December 13, 2020; 2:00 p.m., ACCN	No. 4	at Boston College	W 75–69	6–0 (1–0)	Conte Forum (0); Chestnut Hill, MA
December 17, 2020; 7:00 p.m., RSN	No. 4	Wake Forest	W 79–65	7–0 (2–0)	Reynolds Coliseum (25); Raleigh, NC
December 20, 2020; Noon, ACCNX	No. 4	Miami (FL)	W 78–47	8–0 (3–0)	Reynolds Coliseum (25); Raleigh, NC
December 20, 2020; 4:00 p.m., ACCN	No. 4	Duke	Postponed		Reynolds Coliseum; Raleigh, NC
December 31, 2020; 7:00 p.m., RSN	No. 3	at Georgia Tech	W 84–75	9–0 (4–0)	McCamish Pavilion (1,200); Atlanta, GA
January 3, 2021; 2:00 p.m., ACCN	No. 3	Boston College	W 76–57	10–0 (5–0)	Reynolds Coliseum (0); Raleigh, NC
January 7, 2021; 8:30 p.m., RSN	No. 3	at Virginia Tech	Postponed		Cassell Coliseum; Blacksburg, VA
January 10, 2021; 4:00 p.m., ACCN	No. 3	at Wake Forest	Postponed		LJVM Coliseum; Winston-Salem, NC
January 14, 2021; 7:00 p.m., ACCNX	No. 3	Virginia	Postponed		Reynolds Coliseum; Raleigh, NC
January 17, 2021; 3:00 p.m., ESPN	No. 3	at No. 2 Louisville	Postponed		KFC Yum! Center; Louisville, KY
January 21, 2021; 8:00 p.m., ACCN	No. 2	at Florida State	Postponed		Donald L. Tucker Center; Tallahassee, FL
January 24, 2021; 4:00 p.m., ACCN	No. 2	Virginia Tech	W 89–87	11–0 (6–0)	Reynolds Coliseum (25); Raleigh, NC
January 28, 2021; 4:00 p.m., RSN	No. 2	at Virginia Tech	L 71–83 ^{OT}	11–1 (6–1)	Cassell Coliseum (250); Blacksburg, VA
February 1, 2021; 7:00 p.m., ESPN2	No. 4	at No. 1 Louisville	W 74–60	12–1 (7–1)	KFC Yum! Center (2,989); Louisville, KY
February 7, 2021; 2:00 p.m., ACCN	No. 4	at North Carolina; Rivalry	L 69–76	12–2 (7–2)	Carmichael Arena (0); Chapel Hill, NC
February 11, 2021; 4:00 p.m., RSN	No. 4	Clemson	W 86–65	13–2 (8–2)	Reynolds Coliseum (25); Raleigh, NC
February 15, 2021; 5:00 p.m., ESPN2	No. 4	Notre Dame	Postponed		Reynolds Coliseum; Raleigh, NC
February 18, 2021; 7:00 p.m., RSN	No. 4	at Wake Forest	W 66–47	14–2 (9–2)	LJVM Coliseum (0); Winston-Salem, NC
February 18, 2021; 7:00 p.m., ACCNX	No. 4	at Virginia	Canceled		John Paul Jones Arena; Charlottesville, VA
February 21, 2021; Noon, ESPN2	No. 4	North Carolina; Rivalry	W 82–63	15–2 (10–2)	Reynolds Coliseum (25); Raleigh, NC
February 25, 2021; 4:00 p.m., RSN	No. 2	Pittsburgh	W 83–53	16–2 (11–2)	Reynolds Coliseum (25); Raleigh, NC
February 28, 2021; Noon, ACCN	No. 2	at Syracuse	W 68–61	17–2 (12–2)	Carrier Dome (0); Syracuse, NY
ACC tournament
March 5, 2021; 6:00 p.m., RSN	(2) No. 3	vs. (7) Virginia Tech; Quarterfinals	W 68–55	18–2	Greensboro Coliseum (1,259); Greensboro, NC
March 6, 2021; 2:30 p.m., ACCN	(2) No. 3	vs. (3) Georgia Tech; Semifinals	W 66–61	19–2	Greensboro Coliseum (1,122); Greensboro, NC
March 7, 2021; Noon, ESPN2	(2) No. 3	vs. (1) No. 5 Louisville; Final	W 58–56	20–2	Greensboro Coliseum (2,063); Greensboro, NC
NCAA tournament
March 21, 2021; 4:00 p.m., ESPN	(1 M) No. 3	vs. (16 M) North Carolina A&T; First Round	W 79–58	21–2	Strahan Arena; San Marcos, TX
March 23, 2021; 3:00 p.m., ESPN2	(1 M) No. 3	vs. (8 M) No. 19 South Florida; Second Round	W 76–67	22–2	Alamodome; San Antonio, TX
March 27, 2021; 6:00 p.m., ESPN2	(1 M) No. 3	vs. (4 M) No. 12 Indiana; Sweet Sixteen	L 70–73	22–3	Alamodome; San Antonio, TX
*Non-conference game. ^{#}Rankings from AP Poll. (#) Tournament seedings in parentheses. M=Mercado. All times are in Eastern.

== Rankings ==
Regular season polls
Poll	Pre- season	Week 2	Week 3	Week 4	Week 5	Week 6	Week 7	Week 8	Week 9	Week 10	Week 11	Week 12	Week 13	Week 14	Week 15	Week 16	Final
AP	8	8	4 (2)	4 (2)	4 (2)	3 (2)	3 (2)т	3 (1)	2 (5)	2 (5)	4	4 (1)	4	2	3	3 (2)	3 (2)
Coaches	6	3 (1)	3	3	3	3	2 (1)	2 (2)	2 (7)	6	6	4	4	3	3	3	7

Legend
	Increase in ranking
	Decrease in ranking
	Not ranked previous week
(RV)	Received votes

Coaches did not release a Week 2 poll and AP does not release a final poll.
