= Indonesian Institute of the Arts, Surakarta =

Indonesia Institute of the Art Surakarta
- Javanese: ꦆꦤ꧀ꦱ꧀ꦠꦶꦠꦸꦠ꧀ꦱꦼꦤꦶꦆꦤ꧀ꦢꦺꦴꦤꦺꦱꦶꦪꦯꦸꦫꦏꦂꦠ, romanized: "Institut Seni Indonésia Surakarta"
- Type: Public
- Established: 2005
- Location: Surakarta, Central Java, Indonesia
- Colours: Maroon
- Website: www.isi-ska.ac.id

Indonesia Institute of the Arts, Surakarta (Indonesian: Institut Seni Indonesia Surakarta; abbreviated by ISI Surakarta) is an arts institute in Surakarta, Central Java, Indonesia. They are famous for teaching karawitan, wayang, Javanese dance, and other traditional crafts. The rector is Dr. Drs Guntur, M.Hum.

== History ==
The institute began in 1964 under the name Karawitan Arts Academy of Indonesia (Indonesian: Akademi Seni Karawitan Indonesia). By 1973, with the release of a decree from the Education and Cultural Ministry, the academy was able to open up a bachelor's degree program for Karawitan. In 1988, the academy underwent a structural and name change and became Indonesian Arts College of Surakarta (Indonesian: Sekolah Tinggi Seni Indonesia Surakarta). It was only in 2006 that the name Indonesian Institute of the Arts Surakarta became the official name of the school.

== Logo and philosophy ==
The institute unveiled its new logo in 2017. The new logo is a swan chimera in red and contains several parts, each with its own meaning.

1. Swan, indicating explorer
2. Urna, indicating sharp vision
3. Patra eras, indicating discerning ears
4. Dolphin fins and flukes, indicating directional control
5. Eagle claws, indicating a principled character
6. Mangosteen, indicating honesty
7. Champak flower and leaves, indicating morality and service to other people

== Campuses ==
Indonesian Institute of the Arts Surakarta has two campuses, an older campus in Kentingan for the Faculty of Performing Arts and a newer one in Mojosongo for the Art and Design Faculty.

== Faculties ==
The institute serves both undergraduate and postgraduate students. Undergraduate students are able to choose from eight majors, divided into two faculties. Postgraduate students have two specializations that they can pick from.

=== Faculty of Performing Arts ===
1. Department of Ethnomusicology
2. Department of Dance
3. Department of Theater
4. Department of Puppetry Arts

=== Faculty of Art and Design ===
1. Department of Arts and Crafts
2. Department of Television and Film
3. Department of Fine Arts
4. Department of Interior Design

=== Postgraduate Faculty ===
1. Department of Art Appraisal
2. Department of Art Production

== Facilities ==
=== Performing arts center ===
The institute has three performing arts centers that are located outdoors.

1. Ampthiteater (Teater Terbuka)
2. Humardani Theatre (Teater Humardani)
3. Eden Park (Taman Eden)

=== Other facilities ===
There are several other facilities that can be found in the Indonesian Institute of the Arts, Surakarta, including studios dedicated to each major, multimedia rooms; tennis, basketball, and volleyball field; library; and a mosque called Kalimasada Mosque.

== Notable alumni ==
- Vincent McDermott
- Sumarsam
