= John McDermott =

John McDermott may refer to:

- John McDermott (heavyweight boxer) (born 1980), English boxer
- John McDermott (featherweight boxer), Scottish boxer
- John McDermott (English footballer) (born 1969), former Grimsby Town footballer
- John McDermott (Gaelic footballer), former Meath Gaelic footballer
- John McDermott (director) (1893–1946), American film director and screenwriter
- John McDermott (Australian footballer) (1872–1925), Australian rules footballer
- John McDermott (golfer) (1891–1971), American golfer
- John McDermott (American artist) (1919–1977), American illustrator and author
- John McDermott (runner) (1880–1948), American marathoner
- John McDermott (singer) (born 1955), Scottish-Canadian singer
- John F. McDermott, American psychiatrist
- John J. McDermott (philosopher) (1932–2018), distinguished professor at Texas A&M University
- John McDermott (Scottish artist) (born 1957), Scottish artist and veteran affairs activist
- John Joseph McDermott (born 1963), American Catholic prelate

== See also ==
- Jack McDermott (1906–1958), Irish trade unionist
- John MacDermott (disambiguation)
