= 2020–21 Clemson Tigers women's basketball team =

Women's college basketball season

2020–21 Clemson Tigers women's basketball
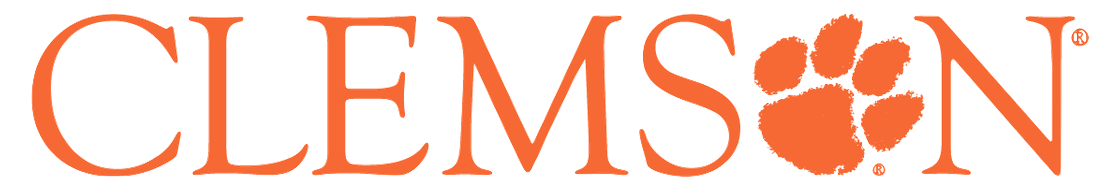

WNIT, second round
- Conference: Atlantic Coast Conference
- Record: 12–14 (5–12 ACC)
- Head coach: Amanda Butler (3rd season)
- Assistant coaches: Shimmy Grey-Miller (3rd season); Joy Smith (3rd season); Daniel Barber (3rd season)
- Home arena: Littlejohn Coliseum

2020–21 ACC women's basketball standings
| | Conf. | | | | Overall |
| Team | W | | L | PCT | W | | L | PCT |
|---|---|---|---|---|---|---|---|---|
| No. 8 Louisville | 14 | – | 2 | .875 | 26 | – | 4 | .867 |
| No. 3 NC State† | 12 | – | 2 | .857 | 22 | – | 3 | .880 |
| Georgia Tech | 12 | – | 6 | .667 | 17 | – | 9 | .654 |
| Syracuse | 9 | – | 7 | .563 | 15 | – | 9 | .625 |
| Florida State | 9 | – | 7 | .563 | 10 | – | 9 | .526 |
| Notre Dame | 8 | – | 7 | .533 | 10 | – | 10 | .500 |
| Virginia Tech | 8 | – | 8 | .500 | 15 | – | 10 | .600 |
| North Carolina | 8 | – | 9 | .471 | 13 | – | 11 | .542 |
| Miami (FL) | 8 | – | 10 | .444 | 11 | – | 11 | .500 |
| Wake Forest | 8 | – | 10 | .444 | 12 | – | 13 | .480 |
| Clemson | 5 | – | 12 | .294 | 12 | – | 14 | .462 |
| Pittsburgh | 3 | – | 12 | .200 | 5 | – | 14 | .263 |
| Boston College | 2 | – | 11 | .154 | 7 | – | 12 | .368 |
| Duke | 0 | – | 1 | .000 | 3 | – | 1 | .750 |
| Virginia | 0 | – | 2 | .000 | 0 | – | 5 | .000 |
† 2021 ACC tournament winner Duke suspended their season on December 25, 2020; Virginia suspended their season on January 14, 2021; As of March 30, 2021; Rankings from AP poll

The 2020–21 Clemson Tigers women's basketball team represented Clemson University during the 2020–21 college basketball season. The Tigers were led by third year head coach Amanda Butler. The Tigers, members of the Atlantic Coast Conference, played their home games at Littlejohn Coliseum.

The Tigers finished the season 12–14 and 5–12 in ACC play to finish in eleventh place. In the ACC tournament, they defeated Notre Dame in the second round before losing to Georgia Tech in the quarterfinals. They received an at-large bid to the WNIT. They defeated Ohio in the first round before losing to Delaware in the second round to end their season.

== Previous season ==
The Tigers finished the 2019–20 season 8–23, 3–15 in ACC play to finish in fourteenth place. They lost to Boston College in the second round of the ACC tournament. The NCAA tournament and WNIT were cancelled due to the COVID-19 outbreak.

After the season, Kobi Thornton was drafted in the third round of the WNBA draft (27th overall) by the Atlanta Dream.

== Offseason ==
=== Departures ===
| Name | Number | Pos. | Height | Year | Hometown | Reason for departure |
|---|---|---|---|---|---|---|
| Isis Lopes | 11 | G | 5'10" | Freshman | Melbourne, Australia | Transferred to UTEP |
| Chyna Cotton | 32 | G | 5'10" | Senior | Mableton, GA | Graduated |
| Kobi Thornton | 44 | F | 6'2" | Senior | Shellman, GA | Declared for WNBA draft; selected 27th overall by Atlanta Dream |

=== 2020 recruiting class ===
College recruiting information
| Name | Hometown | School | Height | Weight | Commit date |
|---|---|---|---|---|---|
| Gabrielle Elliot; G | Detroit, Michigan | Detroit Edison Public Academy | 5 ft 10 in (1.78 m) | N/A | |
| Gabrielle Elliot; G | Recruit ratings: ESPN: (97) | | | | |
| Weronika Hipp; PG | Ostrów Wielkopolski, Poland | Eagle's Landing Christian Academy | 5 ft 8 in (1.73 m) | N/A | |
| Weronika Hipp; PG | Recruit ratings: ESPN: (90) | | | | |
| Clair Neff; W | Bel Air, MD | Maryvale Prep | 6 ft 1 in (1.85 m) | N/A | |
| Clair Neff; W | Recruit ratings: ESPN: (88) | | | | |
Overall recruit ranking:
Note: In many cases, Scout, Rivals, 247Sports, On3, and ESPN may conflict in their listings of height and weight.; In these cases, the average was taken. ESPN grades are on a 100-point scale.; Sources:

== Roster ==
2020–21 Clemson Tigers women's basketball team
Players
Coaches

| Pos. | # | Name | Height | Year | Previous school | Hometown |
|---|---|---|---|---|---|---|
| G | 00 | Delicia Washington | 5 ft 10 in (1.78 m) | RS Sr | Baker County; Florida | Macclenny, FL |
| G | 1 | Destiny Thomas | 5 ft 10 in (1.78 m) | Sr | Pelham | Pelham, GA |
| G | 2 | Kaylee Sticker | 5 ft 11 in (1.8 m) | So | Dawson County | Dawsonville, GA |
| G | 3 | Kendall Spray | 5 ft 5 in (1.65 m) | RS Sr | Wilson Central; UT Martin | Nashville, TN |
| G | 4 | Weronika Hipp | 5 ft 8 in (1.73 m) | Fr | Eagle's Landing Christian Academy | Ostrów Wielkopolski, Poland |
| F | 5 | Amari Robinson | 6 ft 0 in (1.83 m) | So | Douglas County | Douglasville, GA |
| G | 10 | Gabby Elliot | 5 ft 10 in (1.78 m) | Fr | Detroit Edison Public Academy | Detroit, Michigan |
| G | 12 | Hannah Hank | 6 ft 2 in (1.88 m) | So | Forestville | Port Lincoln, Australia |
| F | 21 | Skylar Blackstock | 5 ft 11 in (1.8 m) | Jr | Wando | Charleston, SC |
| G | 22 | Danae McNeal | 6 ft 0 in (1.83 m) | So | Swansea High School | Swansea, SC |
| C | 24 | Mikayla Hayes | 6 ft 3 in (1.91 m) | RS Jr | Park Center; Florida | Minneapolis, MN |
| G | 31 | Shania Meertens | 5 ft 8 in (1.73 m) | Sr | Winter Springs; Northwest Florida State College | Winter Springs, FL |
| G | 32 | Chyna Cotton | 5 ft 10 in (1.78 m) | Sr | Southwest Atlanta Christian | Monroe, GA |
| F | 35 | Nique Cherry | 6 ft 1 in (1.85 m) | Jr | Heidelberg; Jones County Junior College | Laurel, MS |
| C | 55 | Tylar Bennett | 6 ft 4 in (1.93 m) | Jr | Detroit Country Day | Redford, MI |

Head coach

- Amanda Butler (Florida)

Assistant coach(es)

- Shimmy Gray–Miller (Michigan)
- Joy Cheek (Duke)
- Daniel Barber (Florida)

Legend

- (C) Team captain
- (S) Suspended
- (I) Ineligible
- (W) Walk-on
- Injured
- Current redshirt

Roster
Last update: November 16, 2020

== Schedule ==
| Date time, TV | Rank^{#} | Opponent^{#} | Result | Record | High points | High rebounds | High assists | Site (attendance) city, state |
Non-conference regular season
| November 25, 2020*; 2:00 p.m., ACCNX | | Furman | W 83–43 | 1–0 | 23 – Elliott | 7 – Tied | 3 – Hipp | Littlejohn Coliseum (411); Clemson, SC |
| November 27, 2020*; 5:00 p.m., ACCN | | Presbyterian | W 92–47 | 2–0 | 18 – Spray | 10 – Washington | 4 – Robinson | Littlejohn Coliseum (445); Clemson, SC |
| November 30, 2020*; 2:00 p.m. | | at Charlotte | W 80–73 | 3–0 | 27 – Washington | 8 – Tied | 6 – Washington | Dale F. Halton Arena (17); Charlotte, NC |
| December 2, 2020*; Noon, ACCNX | | Mercer | W 67–54 | 4–0 | 17 – Meertens | 10 – Bennett | 3 – Hipp | Littlejohn Coliseum (211); Clemson, SC |
| December 6, 2020*; 2:00 p.m., ACCNX | | College of Charleston | W 87–65 | 5–0 | 17 – Spray | 9 – Elliott | 4 – Tied | Littlejohn Coliseum (342); Clemson, SC |
Conference regular season
| December 10, 2020; 3:00 p.m., ACCNX | | at Virginia | W 71–55 | 6–0 (1–0) | 11 – McNeal | 9 – Tied | 5 – Meertens | John Paul Jones Arena (250); Charlottesville, VA |
| December 13, 2020; Noon, ACCN | | at Pittsburgh | L 71–80 | 6–1 (1–1) | 17 – Robinson | 8 – Robinson | 3 – Spray | Petersen Events Center (0); Pittsburgh, PA |
| December 17, 2020; 7:00 p.m., ACCNX | | Florida State | W 72–69 | 7–1 (2–1) | 19 – Elliott | 6 – Washington | 3 – Elliott | Littlejohn Coliseum (346); Clemson, SC |
| December 20, 2020; 3:00 p.m., RSN | | Notre Dame | W 78–55 | 8–1 (3–1) | 17 – Elliott | 9 – Robinson | 4 – Washington | Littlejohn Coliseum (425); Clemson, SC |
| January 3, 2021; Noon, ACCN | | at Miami (FL) | L 71–80 | 8–2 (3–2) | 22 – Washington | 8 – Washington | 4 – Washington | Watsco Center (0); Coral Gables, FL |
| January 7, 2021; 7:00 p.m., ACCNX | | Georgia Tech | L 55–67 | 8–3 (3–3) | 19 – Elliott | 11 – Washington | 3 – Washington | Littlejohn Coliseum (452); Clemson, SC |
| January 10, 2021; 2:00 p.m., ACCN | | at Pittsburgh | Postponed due to Pittsburgh pausing team activities | | | | | Peterson Events Center; Pittsburgh, PA |
| January 10, 2021; Noon, ACCN | | at No. 2 Louisville | L 45–70 | 8–4 (3–4) | 11 – Elliott | 8 – Elliott | 2 – 3 tied | KFC Yum! Center (2,734); Louisville, KY |
| January 14, 2021; 7:00 p.m., ACCNX | | at Duke | Canceled due to Duke suspending season | | | | | Cameron Indoor Stadium; Durham, NC |
| January 17, 2021; 2:00 p.m., RSN | | at Florida State | Postponed due to scheduling | | | | | Donald L. Tucker Center; Tallahassee, FL |
| January 21, 2021; 7:00 p.m., ACCNX | | at Boston College | Postponed | | | | | Conte Forum; Chestnut Hill, MA |
| January 21, 2021; 7:00 p.m., ACCNX | | at Florida State | L 88–95 ^{2OT} | 8–5 (3–5) | 33 – Washington | 9 – Robinson | 3 – Washington | Donald L. Tucker Center (1,112); Tallahassee, FL |
| January 24, 2021; Noon, ACCN | | No. 23 Syracuse | W 86–77 ^{OT} | 9–5 (4–5) | 24 – Spray | 11 – Washington | 4 – Washington | Littlejohn Coliseum (421); Clemson, SC |
| January 26, 2021; 7:00 p.m., ACCNX | | Pittsburgh | L 69–79 | 9–6 (4–6) | 17 – Washington | 12 – Robinson | 7 – Washington | Littlejohn Coliseum (307); Clemson, SC |
| January 28, 2021; 7:00 p.m., RSN | | Virginia | Canceled due to Virginia suspending season | | | | | Littlejohn Coliseum; Clemson, SC |
| January 31, 2021; 2:00 p.m., ACCN | | at Wake Forest | W 69–66 | 10–6 (5–6) | 17 – Washington | 7 – 3 tied | 5 – Washington | LJVM Coliseum (0); Winston-Salem, NC |
| February 4, 2021; 7:00 p.m., ACCNX | | at Georgia Tech | L 69–71 | 10–7 (5–7) | 19 – Elliott | 5 – 3 tied | 4 – Elliott | McCamish Pavilion (1,200); Atlanta, GA |
| February 7, 2021; 2:00 p.m., ACCNX | | Boston College | Postponed | | | | | Littlejohn Coliseum; Clemson, SC |
| February 11, 2021; 4:00 p.m., RSN | | at No. 4 NC State | L 65–86 | 10–8 (5–8) | 24 – Washington | 9 – Robinson | 4 – Tied | Reynolds Coliseum (25); Raleigh, NC |
| February 14, 2021; 2:00 p.m., ACCN | | Wake Forest | L 65–72 | 10–9 (5–9) | 18 – Elliot | 6 – Washington | 5 – Washington | Littlejohn Coliseum (512); Clemson, SC |
| February 18, 2021; 7:00 p.m., ACCNX | | North Carolina | L 64–77 | 10–10 (5–10) | 15 – Washington | 7 – Robinson | 6 – Washington | Littlejohn Coliseum (326); Clemson, SC |
| February 25, 2021; 6:00 p.m., ACCN | | Virginia Tech | L 64–70 | 10–11 (5–11) | 17 – Washington | 7 – Cherry | 4 – Tied | Littlejohn Coliseum (327); Clemson, SC |
| February 28, 2021; 2:00 p.m., ACCNRSN | | Miami (FL) | L 62–68 | 10–12 (5–12) | 14 – Washington | 8 – Washington | 5 – Washington | Littlejohn Coliseum (507); Clemson, SC |
ACC Women's Tournament
| March 4, 2021; 8:30 p.m., RSN | (11) | vs. (6) Notre Dame; Second Round | W 68–63 | 11–12 | 25 – Elliott | 8 – Robinson | 7 – Washington | Greensboro Coliseum (451); Greensboro, NC |
| March 5, 2021; 8:30 p.m., RSN | (11) | vs. (3) Georgia Tech; Quarterfinals | L 57–60 | 11–13 | 24 – Washington | 7 – Robinson | 4 – Thomas | Greensboro Coliseum (1,259); Greensboro, NC |
WNIT
| March 19, 2021; 2:00 p.m., FloHoops | | vs. Ohio; First Round – Charlotte Regionals | W 65–60 | 12–13 | 19 – Washington | 10 – Robinson | 6 – Washington | Bojangles Coliseum (0); Charlotte, NC |
| March 20, 2021; 2:00 p.m., FloHoops | | vs. Delaware; Second Round – Charlotte Regionals | L 74–87 | 12–14 | 28 – Washington | 8 – Washington | 5 – Thomas | Bojangles Coliseum (0); Charlotte, NC |
*Non-conference game. ^{#}Rankings from AP Poll. (#) Tournament seedings in parentheses. All times are in Eastern.

== Rankings ==
Regular season polls
| Poll | Pre- Season | Week 2 | Week 3 | Week 4 | Week 5 | Week 6 | Week 7 | Week 8 | Week 9 | Week 10 | Week 11 | Week 12 | Week 13 | Week 14 | Week 15 | Week 16 | Final |
|---|---|---|---|---|---|---|---|---|---|---|---|---|---|---|---|---|---|
| AP | | | | | | | | | | | | | | | | | |
| Coaches | | | | RV | RV | RV | RV | | | | | | | | | | |

Legend
| | Increase in ranking |
| | Decrease in ranking |
| | Not ranked previous week |
| (RV) | Received Votes |

== See also ==
- 2020–21 Clemson Tigers men's basketball team
