= James McDermott =

James or Jim McDermott may refer to:

== Politics ==
- James T. McDermott (politician) (1872–1938), American politician
- James C. "Jim" McDermott, American politician and candidate for the 2026 United States House of Representatives election in Alaska
- Jim McDermott (1936–2026), American politician

== Sports ==
- James McDermott (baseball) (1846–1882), American baseball player
- Jim McDermott (basketball) (1910–2009), American basketball and baseball coach
- James McDermott, one of the Four Horsemen of the Apocalypse blackjack strategy pioneers
- Jimmy McDermott (1932–2006), English professional footballer

== Others ==
- James McDermott (business executive), American businessman, former CEO and chairman of Keefe, Bruyette & Woods
- James T. McDermott (judge) (1926–1992), American judge
- Jim McDermott (illustrator) (born 1960), New Hampshire-based artist
