= Vincent McDermott =

American composer and ethnomusicologist (1933–2016)

- Born: September 5, 1933; Atlantic City, New Jersey, U.S.
- Died: February 10, 2016 (aged 82); Sumatra, Indonesia
- Other names: Joseph McDermott
- Education: University of Pennsylvania (BFA, PhD); University of California, Berkeley (MA)
- Occupations: Composer; ethnomusicologist

(Joseph) Vincent McDermott (September 5, 1933 – February 10, 2016) was a classically trained American composer and ethnomusicologist. His works show particular influence from the musics of South and Southeast Asia, particularly the gamelan music of Java. He was among the second generation of American composers to create and promote new compositions for gamelan.

== Early life and education ==
McDermott was born in Atlantic City, New Jersey. He received a B.F.A. in music composition from the University of Pennsylvania (1959), an M.A. in music history from the University of California, Berkeley (1961), and a Ph.D. in music history, theory, and composition from the University of Pennsylvania (1966). His composition instructors included Constant Vauclain, George Rochberg, Darius Milhaud, and Karlheinz Stockhausen.

McDermott first encountered gamelan circa 1965 in Amsterdam. He later studied Javanese gamelan in Indonesia at the Akademi Seni Karawitan Indonesia (now Sekolah Tinggi Seni Indonesia Surakarta) in Central Java (1971, 1978, and 1984). He studied or worked in Surakarta with Sumarsam and Rahayu Supanggah, and later, in the United States, with Pak Cokro and Midiyanto.

== Career ==
McDermott taught at the Hampton Institute (now Hampton University) in Virginia (1966–67) and at the Wisconsin Conservatory of Music in Milwaukee where he served for a time as dean and director (1967–1977). In 1977 he began teaching at Lewis & Clark College in Oregon; he retired in December 1997. While there he began the college's world music program and in 1980 founded its first gamelan, Venerable Showers of Beauty, which was purchased in Java with the help of Rahayu Supanggah and Nyonya Nora along with an American patron, Loraine Fenwick. He directed the gamelan and later invited Javanese musicians to teach (including Midiyanto, Supardi, and Darsono). He also instituted classes in Indian and African music performance with Nisha Joshi and Obo Addy. He later helped to establish gamelan programs at the College of William & Mary and the University of Puget Sound.

=== Compositions ===
Many of McDermott's works are for standard Western ensembles (e.g. chamber, orchestral, choral, solo, and electronic). In 1969 he began to incorporate sounds and ideas from North Indian music. In 1980 Lou Harrison encouraged McDermott to begin composing for gamelan. He then composed a number of works for gamelan (some in combination with Western instruments), and presented gamelan workshops in several Asian nations (including Malaysia and Japan), focusing primarily on encouraging new compositions for gamelan. He received several Fulbright grants and National Endowment for the Arts commissions and a "Master's Award" from the Oregon Arts Commission.

== Later life ==
After retirement, McDermott was a visiting professor at The College of William and Mary (2002); Indonesian Institute of the Arts (2002–03); University of Malaya, Kuala Lumpur (2006); Osaka City University (2005); and University of Technology (MARA), Shah Alam, Malaysia (2009). The last four placements were assisted by Fulbright programs.

During his last years, McDermott divided his time between the United States and Yogyakarta, Indonesia. In Yogyakarta, he directed an ensemble called Musica Teatrica Nova.

== Personal life and death ==
In 1980, McDermott became friends with Lou Harrison, the godfather of American gamelan. It was Harrison who encouraged McDermott to start composing for gamelan.

He died in Sumatra, Indonesia, on February 10, 2016.

== Selected works ==
- 1967 – Five Bagatelles, piano
- 1970 – Three for Five, flute, sax, tabla, vibes, piano
- 1972 – Komal Usha-Rudra Nisha, sitar, flute, guitar, and double bass
- 1972 – He Who ascends by Ecstasy into Contemplation of Sublime Things Sleeps and Sees a Dream, piano and tape
- 1973 – Time Let Me Plan and Be Golden in the Mercy of His Means, guitar and harpsichord
- 1975 – Magic Grounds, piano
- 1975 – Orpheus, tape and video
- 1975 – Pictures at an Exhibition, tape and slide projections
- 1976 – Siftings Upon Siftings, orchestra
- 1977 – Slayer of Time, Ancient of Days, (cantata), voices, E. horn, harp, cello, percussion, texts from Bhagavad-Gita and Rabindranath Tagore
- 1978 – Rain of Hollow Reeds, tape
- 1978 – Smoke of Burning Cloves, solo instrument
- 1978 – A Perpetual Dream, opera for solo voice, tape, dancers/mimes, bonang, and toy piano
- 1979 – Solonese Concerto, piano and chamber orchestra
- 1980 – A Stately Salute, in honor of Lou Harrison, pelog gamelan
- 1980 – Laudamus, chorus
- 1981 – Kagoklaras (A Different Song), gamelan and prepared piano
- 1981 – Tagore Songs, soprano and guitar
- 1982 – Sweet-Breathed Minstrel I, a mystic poem of Rumi, slendro gamelan, two solo voices, and viola
- 1983 – The Dark Laments of Ariadne and of attis, 2 songs after Catullus, soprano, narrator, viola, tape
- 1984 – The Bells of Tajilor, gamelan slendro/pelog
- 1986 – Fiddles, Queens, and Laddies, soprano, tape, and drums on texts by Laurence Sterne and Robert Burns
- 1990 – The King of Bali (opera), gamelan and orchestra
- 1991 – Fugitive Moons, string quartet
- 1994 – Mata Hari (opera), chamber music group and gamelan
- 1994 – Titus Magnificus, orchestra
- 1997 – Sweet-Breathed Minstrel II, pelog gamelan, two solo voices, and male chorus (3–4 voices), text by Jalal ad-Din Muhammad Rumi
- 1999 – Quartet for trumpet, sax, piano, percussion
- 2002 – The Spirit Takes Wings and Soars (or Dragons in the Grachten), 12-tone gamelan and saxophone quartet
- 2003 – Divine Songs for voice and gender/vibraphone
- 2005 – A Little Concerto, gamelan slendro/pelog
- 2005 – The Blue Forest, gamelan, chorus, dancers, and shadow puppetry
- 2006 – Cahaya Jiwa (Light of the Soul), solo voice and instrument
- 2008 – "Mimpi Solo (Solonese Dreams)", gamelan

== Published writings ==
- McDermott, Vincent (1966). "The Articulation of Musical Space in the 20th Century." Ph.D. dissertation. University of Pennsylvania.
- —. "A Conceptual Musical Space." Journal of Aesthetics and Art Criticism, v. 30, no. 4 (Summer 1972), pp. 489–494.
- —, with Sumarsam. "Central Javanese Music: The Patet of Laras Slendro and the Gender Barung." Ethnomusicology 19:2 (1975).
- —. "Gamelans and New Music." The Musical Quarterly, v. 72, no. 1 (1986), pp. 16–27.
- —. Imagi-Nation: Membuat Musik Biasa Jadi Luar Biasa (in Indonesian). Art Music Today, Yogyakarta, Indonesia, 2013. 94 pp. Introduction by Rahayu Supanggah. [English translation of title: (A new) National Imagination. Making Ordinary Music Extraordinary]
