= Hugh McDermott =

Hugh McDermott may refer to:

- Hugh McDermott (basketball) (1893–1978), head basketball coach at the University of Oklahoma, 1922–1938
- Hugh McDermott (actor) (1906–1972), British actor
- Hugh McDermott (politician) (born 1968), Australian politician
- Hugh Joseph McDermott, engineer
