= Charles McDermott =

Charles McDermott may refer to:

- Charlie McDermott (born 1990), American actor
- Charles McDermott (footballer) (1912–?), English footballer
- Charles McDermott (inventor) (1808–1884), American physician and inventor
- Chuck McDermott, American musician, songwriter and lyricist
