= Andrew McDermott =

Andrew or Andy McDermott may refer to:

- Andrew McDermott (singer) (1966–2011), English singer
- Andrew McDermott (footballer) (1889–1915), Scottish footballer
- Andy McDermott (born 1974), British author
- Andy McDermott (soccer, born 1976), American midfielder
- Andy McDermott (soccer, born 1977), Australian defender who played in England
