= Kevin McDermott =

Kevin McDermott may refer to:

- Kevin McDermott (singer–songwriter) (born 1962), Scottish singer–songwriter
- Kevin McDermott (American football) (born 1990), American football long snapper
