= John MacDermott =

John MacDermott may refer to:

- John MacDermott, Baron MacDermott (1896–1979), Northern Irish politician and lawyer
- John MacDermott (judge) (1927–2022), Northern Irish barrister and judge
- Seán Mac Diarmada (1883–1916), Irish rebel, leader in the 1916 Easter Rising in Ireland (born John MacDermott)

== See also ==
- John McDermott (disambiguation)
