= 2020–21 Louisville Cardinals women's basketball team =

Intercollegiate basketball season

2020–21 Louisville Cardinals women's basketball

ACC regular season champions

NCAA tournament, Elite Eight
- Conference: Atlantic Coast Conference

Ranking
- Coaches: No. 6
- AP: No. 8
- Record: 26–4 (14–2 ACC)
- Head coach: Jeff Walz (14th season)
- Assistant coaches: Stephanie Norman; Sam Purcell; Jonneshia Pineda
- Home arena: KFC Yum! Center

2020–21 ACC women's basketball standings
	Conf.				Overall
Team	W		L	PCT	W		L	PCT
No. 8 Louisville	14	–	2	.875	26	–	4	.867
No. 3 NC State†	12	–	2	.857	22	–	3	.880
Georgia Tech	12	–	6	.667	17	–	9	.654
Syracuse	9	–	7	.563	15	–	9	.625
Florida State	9	–	7	.563	10	–	9	.526
Notre Dame	8	–	7	.533	10	–	10	.500
Virginia Tech	8	–	8	.500	15	–	10	.600
North Carolina	8	–	9	.471	13	–	11	.542
Miami (FL)	8	–	10	.444	11	–	11	.500
Wake Forest	8	–	10	.444	12	–	13	.480
Clemson	5	–	12	.294	12	–	14	.462
Pittsburgh	3	–	12	.200	5	–	14	.263
Boston College	2	–	11	.154	7	–	12	.368
Duke	0	–	1	.000	3	–	1	.750
Virginia	0	–	2	.000	0	–	5	.000
† 2021 ACC tournament winner Duke suspended their season on December 25, 2020; Virginia suspended their season on January 14, 2021; As of March 30, 2021; Rankings from AP poll

The 2020–21 Louisville Cardinals women's basketball team represented the University of Louisville during the 2020–21 NCAA Division I women's basketball season. The Cardinals, were led by 14th-year head coach Jeff Walz, and played their home games at the KFC Yum! Center in their seventh year in the Atlantic Coast Conference. On January 18, 2021, following a 12–0 start, the Cardinals were ranked number 1 in the AP Poll for the first time in program history, garnering 20 of 29 first place votes.

The Cardinals finished the season 26–4 and 14–2 in ACC play to finish in first place. In the ACC tournament, they defeated Wake Forest in the Quarterfinals and Syracuse before losing in the Final NC State. They received an at-large bid to the NCAA tournament where they were the two seed in the Alamo Regional. In the tournament they defeated fifteen seed Marist in the First Round, seven seed Northwestern in the Second Round, and six seed Oregon in the Sweet Sixteen before losing to one seed and eventual champions Stanford in the Elite Eight to end their season.

== Previous season ==
The Cardinals finished the 2019–20 season at 28–4 and 16–2 in ACC play. They finished as the regular season ACC champions and earned the first seed in the ACC tournament. They defeated Syracuse in the Quarterfinals before losing to eventual champions NC State in the Semifinals. The NCAA tournament was cancelled due to the COVID-19 outbreak.

== Off-season ==
=== Departures ===
Name	Number	Pos.	Height	Year	Hometown	Reason for departure
Yacine Diop	2	G	5'10"	(redshirt) Senior	Dakar, Senegal	Graduated
Seygan Robins	3	G	5'10"	Sophomore	Harrodsburg, KY	Transferred to UT Martin
Lindsey Duvall	12	G	5'9"	(redshirt) Sophomore	Mount Washington, KY	Transferred to Northern Kentucky
Kylee Shook	21	F	6'4"	Senior	Colorado Springs, CO	Graduated; drafted 13th overall in the 2020 WNBA draft by the New York Liberty
Jazmine Jones	23	G	6'0"	Senior	Tallahassee, FL	Graduated; drafted 12th overall in the 2020 WNBA draft by the New York Liberty
Jessica Laemmle	24	G	5'2"	Senior	Louisville, KY	Graduated
Molly Lockhart	30	F	6'3"	(redshirt) Freshman	Louisville, KY	—
Bionca Dunham	33	F	6'2"	Senior	Philadelphia, PA	Graduated

=== Incoming transfers ===
Name	Number	Pos.	Height	Year	Hometown	Previous school
Ahlana Smith	2	G	5'9"	Junior	Charlotte, NC	Gulf Coast State

=== Recruiting class ===
College recruiting
Name	Hometown	School	Height	Weight	Commit date
Hailey Van Lith; G	Wenatchee, WA	Cashmere	5 ft 7 in (1.70 m)	N/A	
Hailey Van Lith; G	Recruit ratings: ESPN: (98)				
Olivia Cochran; F	Columbus, GA	Carver	6 ft 3 in (1.91 m)	N/A	
Olivia Cochran; F	Recruit ratings: ESPN: (98)				
Merissah Russell; G	Ottawa, Ontario	Cairine Wilson	5 ft 11 in (1.80 m)	N/A	
Merissah Russell; G	Recruit ratings: ESPN: (90)				
Ahlana Smith; G	Charlotte, NC	Mallard Creek	5 ft 9 in (1.75 m)	N/A	
Ahlana Smith; G	Recruit ratings: ESPN: (90)				
Overall recruit ranking:
Note: In many cases, Scout, Rivals, 247Sports, On3, and ESPN may conflict in their listings of height and weight.; In these cases, the average was taken. ESPN grades are on a 100-point scale.; Sources:

== Roster ==
2020–21 Louisville Cardinals women's basketball team
Players
Coaches

Pos.	#	Name	Height	Year	Previous school	Hometown
F	0	Ramani Parker	6 ft 4 in (1.93 m)	RS Fr	Montverde Academy	Fresno, CA
G	1	Dana Evans	5 ft 6 in (1.68 m)	Sr	West Side Leadership Academy	Gary, IN
G	2	Ahlana Smith	5 ft 9 in (1.75 m)	Jr	Mallard Creek; Gulf Coast State	Charlotte, NC
F	3	Malea Williams	6 ft 4 in (1.93 m)	Fr	Scott County	Georgetown, KY
G	4	Elizabeth Balogun	6 ft 1 in (1.85 m)	Jr	Hamilton Heights Christian Academy; Georgia Tech	Chattanooga, TN
G	5	Mykasa Robinson	5 ft 7 in (1.7 m)	Jr	Ashland Blazer	Ashland, KY
G	10	Hailey Van Lith	5 ft 7 in (1.7 m)	Fr	Cashmere	Wenatchee, WA
G	11	Norika Konno	5 ft 10 in (1.78 m)	So	Seiwa Gakuen	Sendai, Japan
G	13	Merissah Russell	5 ft 11 in (1.8 m)	Fr	Cairine Wilson	Ottawa, Ontario
G	14	Kianna Smith	6 ft 0 in (1.83 m)	RS Jr	Troy; California	Moreno Valley, CA
F	22	Elizabeth Dixon	6 ft 5 in (1.96 m)	Jr	Ridgeway; Georgia Tech	Memphis, TN
F	44	Olivia Cochran	6 ft 3 in (1.91 m)	Fr	Carver	Columbus, GA

Head coach

- Jeff Walz (Northern Kentucky)

Assistant coach(es)

- Stephanie Norman (Arizona State)
- Sam Purcell (Auburn)
- Jonneshia Pineda (Georgia Southwestern State)

Legend

- (C) Team captain
- (S) Suspended
- (I) Ineligible
- (W) Walk-on
- Injured
- Current redshirt

Roster
Last update: April 16, 2021

== Schedule and results ==
Date time, TV	Rank^{#}	Opponent^{#}	Result	Record	Site (attendance) city, state
Non-conference regular season
November 25, 2020*; 3:00 p.m., ESPN+	No. 5	at Southeast Missouri	W 74–53	1–0	Show Me Center (475); Cape Girardeau, MO
November 29, 2020*; 1:00 p.m., ACCNX	No. 5	Eastern Kentucky	W 101–58	2–0	KFC Yum! Center (2,614); Louisville, KY
December 4, 2020*; 6:30 p.m., ESPN	No. 5	vs. No. 20 DePaul; Jimmy V Classic	W 116–75	3–0	Mohegan Sun Arena; Uncasville, CT
December 6, 2020*; 2:00 p.m.	No. 5	UT Martin	W 85–67	4–0	KFC Yum! Center (2,709); Louisville, KY
ACC regular season
December 9, 2020; 7:00 p.m., RSN	No. 2	at Duke	W 73–49	5–0 (1–0)	Cameron Indoor Stadium (0); Durham, NC
December 13, 2020; 4:00 p.m., ACCN	No. 2	North Carolina	Postponed		KFC Yum! Center; Louisville, KY
December 17, 2020; 8:00 p.m., ACCN	No. 2	Florida State	Postponed		KFC Yum! Center; Louisville, KY
December 20, 2020; 1:00 p.m., RSN	No. 2	Miami (FL)	Postponed		KFC Yum! Center; Louisville, KY
January 1, 2020; 3:00 p.m., ACCNX	No. 2	Northern Kentucky	W 74–64	6–0	KFC Yum! Center (0); Louisville, KY
January 2, 2020; Noon, ACCNX	No. 2	Bellarmine	W 97–46	7–0	KFC Yum! Center (2,718); Louisville, KY
January 3, 2021; Noon, ACCN	No. 2	at Virginia	Postponed		John Paul Jones Arena; Charlottesville, VA
January 5, 2021; 2:30 p.m., ACCN	No. 2	North Carolina	Postponed		KFC Yum! Center; Louisville, KY
January 5, 2021; 2:30 p.m., ACCN	No. 2	UT Martin	W 96–61	8–0	KFC Yum! Center (2,754); Louisville, KY
January 7, 2021; 6:30 p.m., RSN	No. 2	Pittsburgh	Postponed		KFC Yum! Center; Louisville, KY
January 7, 2021; 8:00 p.m., RSN	No. 2	at Virginia Tech	W 71–67	9–0 (2–0)	Cassell Coliseum (250); Blacksburg, VA
January 10, 2021; Noon, ACCN	No. 2	at Florida State	Postponed		Donald L. Tucker Center; Tallahassee, FL
January 10, 2021; Noon, ACCN	No. 2	Clemson	W 70–45	10–0 (3–0)	KFC Yum! Center (2,734); Louisville, KY
January 14, 2021; 8:00 p.m., ACCN	No. 2	Boston College	W 89–70	11–0 (4–0)	KFC Yum! Center (2,604); Louisville, KY
January 17, 2021; 3:00 p.m., ESPN	No. 2	No. 3 NC State	Postponed		KFC Yum! Center; Louisville, KY
January 17, 2021; 3:00 p.m., ESPN	No. 2	Florida State	W 84–56	12–0 (5–0)	KFC Yum! Center (2,804); Louisville, KY
January 21, 2021; 9:00 p.m., ESPN2	No. 1	No. 23 Syracuse	W 67–54	13–0 (6–0)	KFC Yum! Center (2,643); Louisville, KY
January 24, 2021; 2:00 p.m., ACCN	No. 1	at Wake Forest	W 65–63	14–0 (7–0)	LJVM Coliseum (0); Winston-Salem, NC
January 26, 2021; 4:00 p.m., ACCN	No. 1	Miami (FL)	W 79–76	15–0 (8–0)	KFC Yum! Center (2,653); Louisville, KY
January 28, 2021; 7:00 p.m., ACCN	No. 1	North Carolina	W 79–68	16–0 (9–0)	KFC Yum! Center (2,748); Louisville, KY
February 1, 2021; 7:00 p.m., ESPN2	No. 1	No. 4 NC State	L 60–74	16–1 (9–1)	KFC Yum! Center (2,989); Louisville, KY
February 4, 2021; 8:00 p.m., ACCN	No. 1	at Boston College	W 97–68	17–1 (10–1)	Conte Forum (0); Chestnut Hill, MA
February 7, 2021; 2:00 p.m., ESPN	No. 1	Notre Dame	W 71–65	18–1 (11–1)	KFC Yum! Center (2,912); Louisville, KY
February 11, 2021; 7:00 p.m., ACCNX	No. 3	Georgia Tech	W 85–70	19–1 (12–1)	KFC Yum! Center (2,914); Louisville, KY
February 14, 2021; 1:00 p.m., ESPN2	No. 3	at Syracuse	Postponed		Carrier Dome; Syracuse, NY
February 18, 2021; 8:00 p.m., ACCN	No. 3	at Pittsburgh	W 82–58	20–1 (13–1)	Peterson Events Center (500); Pittsburgh, PA
February 21, 2021; 2:00 p.m., ACCNX	No. 3	at Florida State	L 59–68	20–2 (13–2)	Donald L. Tucker Center (1,258); Tallahassee, FL
February 28, 2021; 3:00 p.m., ESPN	No. 6	at Notre Dame	W 78–61	21–2 (14–2)	Purcell Pavilion (126); Notre Dame, IN
ACC Women's Tournament
March 5, 2021; Noon, RSN	(1) No. 5	vs. (9) Wake Forest; Quarterfinals	W 65–53	22–2	Greensboro Coliseum (592); Greensboro, NC
March 6, 2021; Noon, ACCN	(1) No. 5	vs. (5) Syracuse; Semifinals	W 72–59	23–2	Greensboro Coliseum (1,122); Greensboro, NC
March 7, 2021; Noon, ESPN2	(1) No. 5	vs. (2) No. 3 NC State; Final	L 56–58	23–3	Greensboro Coliseum (2,063); Greensboro, NC
NCAA tournament
March 22, 2021; 8:00 p.m., ESPN	(2 A) No. 8	vs. (15 A) Marist; First Round	W 74–43	24–3	Alamodome; San Antonio, TX
March 24, 2021; 5:00 p.m., ESPN2	(2 A) No. 8	vs. (7 A) Northwestern; Second Round	W 62–53	25–3	Alamodome; San Antonio, TX
March 28, 2021; 7:00 p.m., ESPN	(2 A) No. 8	vs. (6 A) No. 23 Oregon; Sweet Sixteen	W 60–42	26–3	Alamodome; San Antonio, TX
March 30, 2021; 7:00 p.m., ESPN	(2 A) No. 8	vs. (1 A) No. 2 Stanford; Elite Eight	L 63–78	26–4	Alamodome (1,463); San Antonio, TX
*Non-conference game. ^{#}Rankings from AP Poll. (#) Tournament seedings in parentheses. A=Alamo. All times are in Eastern.

== Rankings ==
Regular season ranking movement Legend: ██ Increase in ranking. ██ Decrease in ranking. ██ Not ranked the previous week. RV=Received votes. т=Tied with team above or below also with this symbol
Poll	Pre- Season	Week 2	Week 3	Week 4	Week 5	Week 6	Week 7	Week 8	Week 9	Week 10	Week 11	Week 12	Week 13	Week 14	Week 15	Week 16	Final
AP	5	5	2 (2)	2 (1)	2 (1)	2 (1)	2	2	1 (20)^{[A]}	1 (20)	1 (26)	3	3	6	5	7т	8
Coaches	5	2 (6)	2 (6)	2 (1)	2 (1)	2 (1)	2 (1)	1 (30)	1 (30)	3 (5)	2 (11)	2 (8)	5	5	7	7	6

Coaches did not release a Week 2 poll and AP does not release a final poll.

^{A} This is the first time Louisville has been ranked number 1 in the AP Women's Basketball Poll in program history.
