= Joseph McDermott =

Joseph McDermott may refer to:

- Joseph McDermott (actor) (1878–1923), American actor of the silent era
- Joseph H. McDermott (1871–1930), U.S. politician from the state of West Virginia
- Joe McDermott (politician) (born 1967), U.S. politician from the state of Washington
- Joe McDermott (golfer) (born 1940), Irish-American golfer
- Joe McDermott (baseball), American baseball pitcher
