= Thomas McDermott =

Thomas McDermott may refer to:

- Thomas MacDermot (1870–1933), Jamaican writer
- Tommy McDermott (1878–1961), Scottish footballer
- Tom McDermott (musician) (born 1957), American jazz pianist
- Thomas McDermott Jr. (born 1969), mayor of Hammond, Indiana
- Tom McDermott (Big Brother), contestant on the first series of Big Brother in the UK
- Tom McDermott (engineer), American academic
- Tommy McDermott (footballer, born 2005) (born 2005), English footballer
