= Dave McDermott =

American painter

- Born: 1974 (age 51–52); Santa Cruz, CA

Dave McDermott (born 1974) is an American artist from Santa Cruz, California who currently lives and works in Brooklyn, NY. He earned his BFA from the Academy of Art College in San Francisco, and his MFA from Parsons School of Design in New York.

McDermott is primarily known for his work in painting and collage. His paintings are characterized by their use of cultural signifiers and a conspicuous focus on materials, often incorporating gold leaf, yarn, and wood relief alongside oil and canvas.

He is represented by Grimm in Amsterdam.

== Solo exhibitions ==
Goethe's Girlfriend Brennan & Griffin—New York March 2014–April 2014

The Power and Influence of Joseph Wiseman Grimm—Amsterdam November 2013–January 2014

Pleasure Centre Twig—Brussels October 2012–December 2012

Tot Duve Berlin—Berlin April–June 2012

A Rake's Progress Grimm—Amsterdam March–May 2011

The Modern Temper Duve Berlin—Berlin January 2010–March 2011

== Awards and recognition ==
- Zabludowicz Collection Artist in Residence, Sarvisalo, Finland (2010)

== Links ==
- "Artist Pension Trust". APT Global. Artist Pension Trust.
- Klanten, Robert; Hellige, Henrik; Gallagher, James (February 28, 2011). Cutting Edges (1 ed.). Die Gestalten Verlag. ISBN 978-3899553383.
- "Dave McDermott". Grimm Gallery.
- "Dave McDermott". Brennan & Griffin Gallery. Archived from the original on 2015-04-05.
- "Artist Website". Dave McDermott.
- "Dave McDermott". ArtFacts.
