= Sumarsam =

Indonesian gamelan musician and scholar (born 1944)

- Born: Sumarsam; Dander, Bojonegoro, East Java, Indonesia
- Genres: Gamelan
- Occupations: Professor, writer and performer
- Years active: 1951–present
- Website: http://gamelan.blogs.wesleyan.edu/

Sumarsam (born 27 July 1944) is a Javanese musician and scholar of the gamelan.

== Life ==
Sumarsam was born in Dander, Bojonegoro, East Java, Indonesia. He first performed gamelan at the age of seven. He began his formal gamelan education in 1961 at the Konservatori Karawitan Indonesia (KOKAR, now Sekolah Menengah Karawitan Indonesia) in Surakarta. He graduated in 1964 and began to teach, and in 1965 began to study at the newly opened Akademi Seni Karawitan Indonesia (ASKI, now Sekolah Tinggi Seni Indonesia in Surakarta). He graduated in 1968 and did some co-teaching with Martopangrawit. ASKI participated in government programs to promote Indonesian culture abroad, and in 1970 Sumarsam was invited to Expo '70 in Osaka, Japan, where he worked for seven months. In 1971 he was invited to teach at the Indonesian Embassy in Canberra, Australia. Afterwards he moved to the United States to become a visiting artist at Wesleyan University.

Inspired by Western academia, he pursued a master's degree in world music from Wesleyan University from 1974 to 1976. He graduated with the thesis "Inner Melody in Javanese Gamelan." He continued teaching and performing at various universities in the United States, and was made an artist-in-residence at Wesleyan in 1976.

From 1983 he began working on a Ph.D. from Cornell University in ethnomusicology and Southeast Asian Studies. His thesis was "Historical Contexts and Theories of Javanese Music." It was later revised and published as Gamelan: Cultural Interaction and Musical Development in Central Java.

He was made adjunct professor at Wesleyan in 1992, University Professor in 2011, and Professor of Music in 2016, where he now (2017) serves as Winslow-Kaplan Professor of Music. In September 2017, the Indonesian Ministry of Education and Culture is honoring him with a Cultural and Traditional Arts Maestro Award (Satyalancana Kebudayaan).

== Publications ==
- Sumarsan (1984), "Inner Melody in Javanese Gamelan", in Becker, Judith; Feinstein, Alan (eds.), Source Readings in Javanese Gamelan and Vocal Music, vol. 1, Ann Arbor: The University of Michigan Center for South and Southeast Asian Studies, ISBN 978-0-89148-027-3
- Sumarsan (1995) [1992]. Gamelan: Cultural Interaction and Musical Development in Central Java. Chicago: The University of Chicago Press. ISBN 978-0-226-78011-5.
- Sumarsan (2004), "Opportunity and Interaction: The Gamelan from Java to Wesleyan", in Solís, Ted (ed.), Performing Ethnomusicology, University of California Press, ISBN 978-0-520-23831-2
