= Robert McDermott =

Robert McDermott may refer to:

- Bobby McDermott (1914–1963), American basketball player
- Bob McDermott (born 1963), American politician
- Robert A. McDermott (fl. 1960s–2020s), American philosopher, professor of philosophy and religion at the California Institute of Integral Studies
- Robert F. McDermott (1920–2006), American Brigadier General, chairman of United Services Automobile Association
- Robert J. McDermott (fl. 1970s–2010s), American health educator

== See also ==
- Bob McDermid (1895–1952), Scottish footballer
- Robert McDermid (f. 1890s), Scottish footballer
