= Mike McDermott =

Mike McDermott may refer to:

- Mike McDermott (athlete) (1893–1970), U.S. competitor in the 1912 Olympics
- Mike McDermott (baseball) (1862–1943), American baseball player
- Mike McDermott (character), a poker player played by Matt Damon in the 1998 film Rounders
- Mike McDermott (politician) (born 1961), Republican member of the Maryland House of Delegates
- Mick McDermott (born 1974), Northern Irish footballer

== See also ==
- Michael McDermott (disambiguation)
