= The Ensworth School =

Coordinates: 36°07′28″N 86°50′24″W

- Nashville, TN; United States

Information
- Type: Private
- Motto: "In Search of Truth"
- Established: 1958
- Head of school: Prentice Stabler
- Enrollment: 1,202
- Average class size: 16 students
- Student to teacher ratio: 9:1
- Colors: Black and orange
- Athletics conference: TSSAA – Division II
- Mascot: Tiger
- Accreditations: SACS, SAIS
- Endowment: $125 million+
- Website: www.ensworth.com

The Ensworth School is a private school located on two separate campuses in Nashville, Tennessee.

The original campus, with grades kindergarten (previously referred to as "pre-first") through eighth, opened in 1958 with 152 students. The school opened in a large Tudor-style home; its distinctive architecture became a symbol of the school itself. That facility, since expanded several times, is now known as the Red Gables Campus, and is located at 211 Ensworth Avenue.

In 2002 the school initiated a $60 million capital campaign, with the goal of expanding the school to grade 12. After operating for over 40 years as a K–8 school, Ensworth added a high school in 2004, located on Tennessee State Route 100 adjacent to Edwin Warner Park and known as the Frist Campus. The high school began with grade 9 and added a grade each following year; the school's first graduating class matriculated in 2008.

In 2005, the newly constructed high school earned nationwide honors for architecture from American School & University magazine and the Boston Society of Architects.

A 642-seat theater has recently been completed on the high school campus.

== Location ==
Ensworth High School (EHS) is located at 7401 Highway 100, Nashville, Tennessee. The high school campus was built overlooking the confluence of the Harpeth and Little Harpeth Rivers, near Edwin Warner Park.

In June 2003 construction of the school's tennis courts resulted in the discovery of ancient Native American graves. The developer petitioned the Davidson County Chancery Court, and was granted permission to remove and relocate all burials within the construction zone to an adjacent portion of the school property.

Archaeological excavations were subsequently conducted in order to identify and remove all graves from the site. The excavations resulted in the discovery of more than 300 archaeological features, of which 64 contained human remains. Artifacts recovered during these investigations revealed the site was occupied over a 9000-year time frame stretching from the Early Archaic through Mississippian periods. The site was most intensively occupied during the period known as the Benton phase (ca. 6000–5000 B.P.). Artifacts from this period were prolific at the site, and included numerous finely crafted burial offerings.

Beginning around 1798, the land containing EHS was situated within a large agricultural property owned and farmed by the families of brothers Giles and Thomas Harding. Between 1798 and 1807, Giles Harding and his sons constructed a home that would be known as Oak Hill and later Devon Farm. This home was included in the National Register of Historic Places (NRHP) in 1974, due to the architectural integrity of the main house and the significance of the Harding family to the early settlement of the Nashville area. The historic cemetery associated with the Devon Farm was moved in 2003 during construction of EHS. The NRHP-listed home was renovated and now serves as the school's admissions office.

== History ==
Ensworth was founded as an elementary and middle school in 1958. In 1959 kindergarten was added. The Ensworth High School campus was built after a fund-raising campaign that raised nearly 60 million dollars. This also benefited the Lower and Middle Schools. The High School began classes in 2004, and its first senior class graduated in 2008. To commemorate the Lower and Middle school's 50th anniversary during the school year of 2007–08 the students built houses for Habitat For Humanity, a service organization, on a cul de sac named Tiger Way in honor of the school's mascot.

In 1971, the school was overfilled due to the court ordered racial integration of public schools.

== Buildings ==
In 2008–2009 a 642-seat theater was completed and opened at the Frist campus. The theater offers a fully equipped venue for student drama, music, and dance performances. It is also used for school-wide assembly meetings. The theater also houses a scenery construction workshop, sound, lighting and production facilities, green room, and teaching spaces.

In September 2011, the school opened a new gymnasium on the Red Gables Campus, called the Brown Athletic Center. The new facility is a total of three stories with a basement, featuring four, unique accommodations. The first floor features a basketball court that sports the school's colors, bright orange and black. The middle floor features the girls' lockers, a spirit store, and a concessions stand for games held in the gymnasium.

In January 2013, Ensworth opened a natatorium at the Frist campus. Fitted with ten lanes, the pool is frequently used by schools around the area.

In 2017, Ensworth opened up a new Tennis Center at the Frist campus. The Center contains six indoor courts, eight outdoor courts, and covered parking.

== Athletics ==
The Ensworth School has won state championships in girls' basketball in 2008, 2010, 2013 and 2017. They were finalists in 2009, 2012, and 2014. Boys' basketball won championships in 2009, 2011, 2012, 2013, and 2014. They were finalists in 2016. In 2010 and 2011, the volleyball team won state championships. Girls' golf won the state championship in 2011, and were finalists in 2012 and 2013. Girls' lacrosse won a state championship in 2009. The girls' track and field team won the state championship in 2015. The girls' soccer were finalists in 2016. Boys' golf won the state championship in 2019. Boys won Lacrosse State Championship in 2018. Girls' Basketball won the state championship in 2020. There have been individual state championships won in bowling, cross country, golf, swimming and diving, and track and field.

The 2012 football team went 13–0, winning their 3rd-straight state championship. In 2013, the team won their fourth-consecutive state championship.

In 2022, the boys' and girls' golf teams both won the TSSAA Division II AA State Golf Championships. This was the first time in the program's history that the boys' and girls' teams had won in the same year.

== Accreditations and memberships ==
- Tennessee Association of Independent Schools
- Southern Association of Independent Schools
- Southern Association of Colleges and Schools
- Tennessee Secondary School Athletics Association

== Headmasters ==
- John Comfort (founding headmaster) 1959–1964
- Esty Foster 1964–1971
- Ronald L. Fay 1971–1991
- Dr Kirk Walker 1991-2000
- Will Moseley 2000–2012
- David Braemer 2012–2022
- C. Prentice Stabler 2022−

== Notable alumni ==
- Mason Curtis, college football player
- Orleans Darkwa, NFL player
- Joi Gilliam, R&B/rock singer, record producer and songwriter
- Brycen Hopkins, NFL player, son of Brad Hopkins
- Shooter Jennings, country/rock singer, son of Waylon Jennings
- Chaz Lanier, basketball player for the Detroit Pistons
- Key Lawrence, college football player
- Kevin McDermott, NFL player
- Conor McDermott, NFL player
- Corn Elder, NFL player
- Jordan Bone, NBA player
- James Wiseman, NBA player
- Amy Grant, American singer, songwriter, musician, author and media personality
- Tyra Gittens, Olympic track-and-field athlete
- Briana Middleton, Actress and singer
- Jack Alcott, TV Actor
- Nolan White, Broadway Actor

== See also ==
- List of archaeological sites in Tennessee
