= Terry McDermott (disambiguation) =

Terry McDermott (born 1951) is an English ex-footballer, most notably with Liverpool F.C..

Terry McDermott may also refer to:

- Terry McDermott (actor) (1928–2018), Australian actor known for his role in the TV series Homicide
- Terry McDermott (baseball) (born 1951), baseball player for the 1972 Los Angeles Dodgers
- Terry McDermott (journalist), journalist and author of Perfect Soldiers, about the 9/11 hijackers
- Terry McDermott (singer) (born 1977), member of Scottish band Driveblind, the US band Lotus Crush and runner-up in the third season of the American The Voice series
- Terry McDermott (speed skater) (1940–2023), American speed skater
