= Charles McDermott (footballer) =

English footballer

Personal information
- Date of birth: 10 September 1912
- Place of birth: Goole, England
- Height: 5 ft 8 in (1.73 m)
- Position: Left back

Senior career*
Years	Team	Apps	(Gls)
- Goole Town
1931–1936	Bradford City	160	(2)
1939–1940	→ Hartlepool United (war guest)	1	(0)
Total		161+	(2+)
- * Club domestic league appearances and goals

Charles M. McDermott (born 10 September 1912) was an English professional footballer who played as a left back.

== Career ==
Born in Goole, McDermott played for Goole Town and Bradford City. For Bradford City, he made 160 appearances in the Football League; he also made 8 FA Cup appearances. He also guested for Hartlepool United during World War Two.

== Sources ==
- Frost, Terry (1988). Bradford City A Complete Record 1903-1988. Breedon Books Sport. ISBN 0-907969-38-0.
