= Peter McDermott =

Peter McDermott may refer to:

- Peter McDermott (Gaelic footballer) (1918–2007), Gaelic footballer
- Peter McDermott (cricketer) (born 1996), English cricketer
- Peter McDermott (cyclist) (1944–2013), Australian cyclist
