= Kevin McDermott (American football) =

American football player (born 1990)

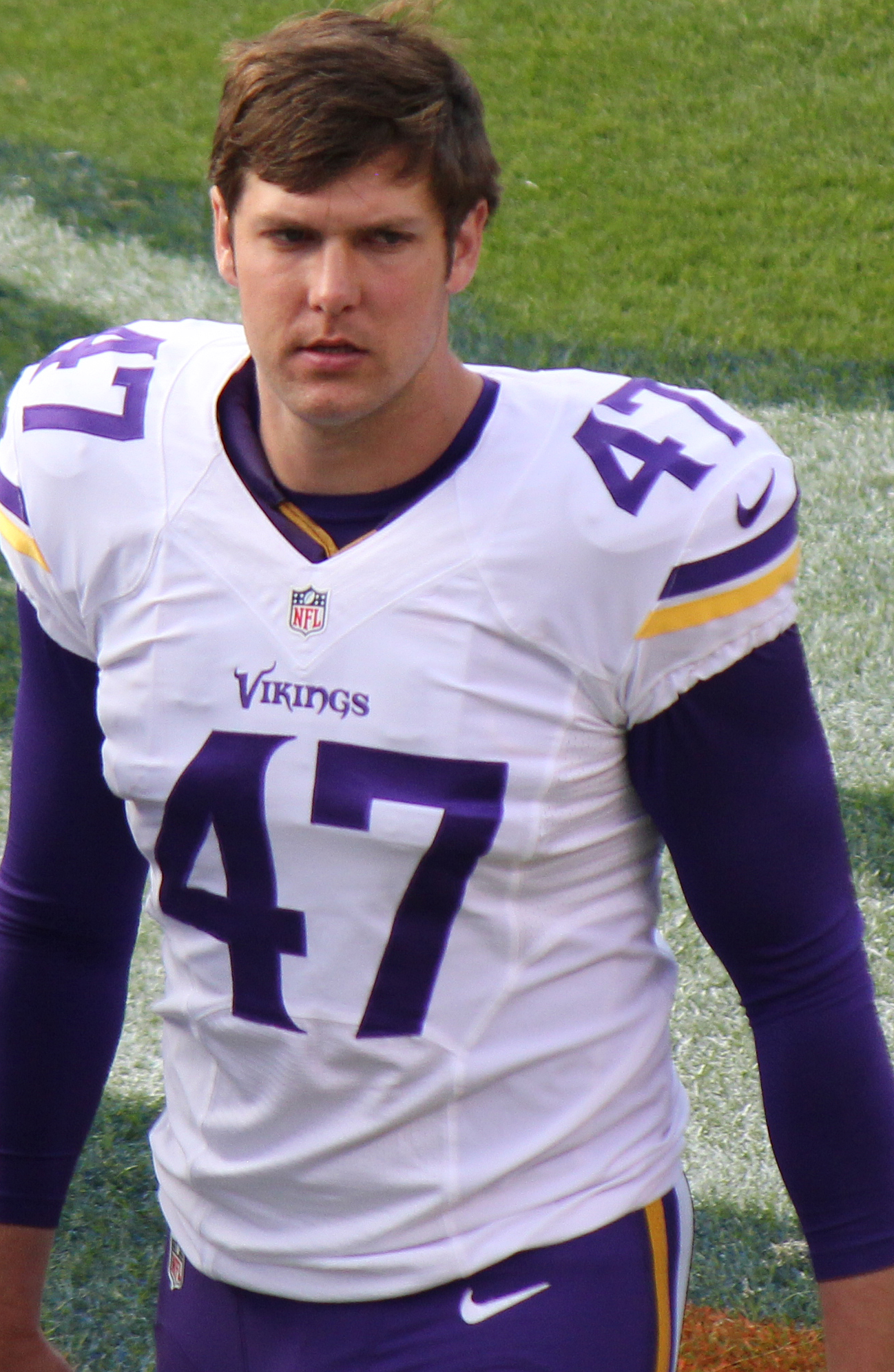
- McDermott with the Minnesota Vikings in 2015

No. 47
- Position: Long snapper

Personal information
- Born: January 12, 1990 (age 36); Nashville, Tennessee, U.S.
- Listed height: 6 ft 5 in (1.96 m)
- Listed weight: 240 lb (109 kg)

Career information
- High school: The Ensworth School (Nashville)
- College: UCLA (2008–2012)
- NFL draft: 2013: undrafted

Career history
- San Francisco 49ers (2013); Denver Broncos (2014)*; Baltimore Ravens (2014); Minnesota Vikings (2015–2018)
- * Offseason or practice squad member only

Career NFL statistics
- Games played: 74
- Total tackles: 2
- Stats at Pro Football Reference

Kevin Patrick McDermott II (born January 12, 1990) is an American former professional football player who was a long snapper in the National Football League (NFL). He played college football for the UCLA Bruins, and signed with the San Francisco 49ers as an undrafted free agent in 2013.

== Early life ==
McDermott was born and raised in Nashville, Tennessee. He was a member of the charter class at Ensworth High School from 2005 to 2008.

== College career ==
McDermott enrolled at the University of California, Los Angeles, in 2008 as a walk-on tight end. In 2011, he was awarded a scholarship by then Bruins head coach Rick Neuheisel upon winning the long snapping job. During the 2011 and 2012 seasons, he started 28 straight games, played in two Pac-12 title games and two bowl games (2011 Kraft Fight Hunger Bowl and 2012 Bridgepoint Education Holiday Bowl). While at UCLA, McDermott majored in Political Science and minored in Film and Television.

== Professional career ==
Pre-draft measurables
Height	Weight	40-yard dash	10-yard split	20-yard split	20-yard shuttle	Three-cone drill	Vertical jump	Broad jump
6 ft 5 in (1.96 m)	238 lb (108 kg)	4.98 s	1.75 s	2.83 s	4.76 s	7.46 s	27 in (0.69 m)	8 ft 9 in (2.67 m)
All values from Pro Day

=== San Francisco 49ers ===
On May 7, 2013, McDermott signed with the San Francisco 49ers as an undrafted free agent following the 2013 NFL draft. He started in all 16 regular season games and three playoff games, including the 2013 NFC Championship against the Seattle Seahawks. McDermott was released during final cuts before the 2014–2015 season.

=== Denver Broncos ===
McDermott was signed to the practice squad of the Denver Broncos on September 3, 2014. He was released on September 9, 2014.

=== Baltimore Ravens ===
On October 20, 2014, McDermott signed with the Baltimore Ravens after incumbent long snapper Morgan Cox tore his ACL. He played in seven regular season games before being placed on Injured Reserve.

=== Minnesota Vikings ===
On April 3, 2015, McDermott signed a two-year contract with the Minnesota Vikings. On August 8, 2016, he signed a four-year extension with the Vikings.

In Week 16 of the 2017 season, McDermott suffered a dislocated shoulder and was placed on injured reserve on December 30, 2017.

In Week 4 of the 2018 season, McDermott lost the tip of his left pinky finger in an opponent's face mask. He finished the game and played the rest of the year.

On August 11, 2019, McDermott was released by the Vikings after the team drafted Austin Cutting.

== Personal life ==
McDermott is married to Lauren, a published author and UCLA alum. His father, Kevin Sr., played basketball at South Dakota State University from 1971 to 1974. His mother, Deborah, was inducted into the Broadcasting & Cable Hall of Fame in October 2013. His younger brother Conor, a former starting left tackle for the UCLA football team, was selected by the New England Patriots in the sixth round of the 2017 NFL draft. McDermott is Catholic. In 2018, McDermott graduated with his Master of Business Administration from Indiana University's Kelley School of Business. McDermott is also a certified pilot.
