= Michael McDermott =

Michael McDermott may refer to:

- Michael McDermott (musician) (born 1968), Chicago folk-rock singer
- Michael McDermott, drummer, formerly of punk rock band The Bouncing Souls, as of 2021 of Joan Jett And The Blackhearts
- Michael McDermott (baseball) (1864–1947), 19th-century baseball pitcher
- Michael McDermott, software engineer who committed the Edgewater Technology shooting
- Michael McDermott (politician), Libertarian gubernatorial candidate for New York in 2014
- Michael McDermott, actor in the 1979 film Starting Over
- Michael McDermott (businessman), Irish-Australian businessman
- Michael J. McDermott, American diplomat
- Michael H. McDermott, member of the Illinois House of Representatives

== See also ==
- Mike McDermott (disambiguation)
