= Frank McDermott =

Frank McDermott may refer to:

- Frank X. McDermott (1924–2011), American politician in the New Jersey Legislature
- Frank McDermott (American football) (1895–?), American college football player and coach

== See also ==
- Frank MacDermot (1886–1975), Irish barrister, soldier, politician, and historian
