= Amanda Butler =

American college basketball coach and former player

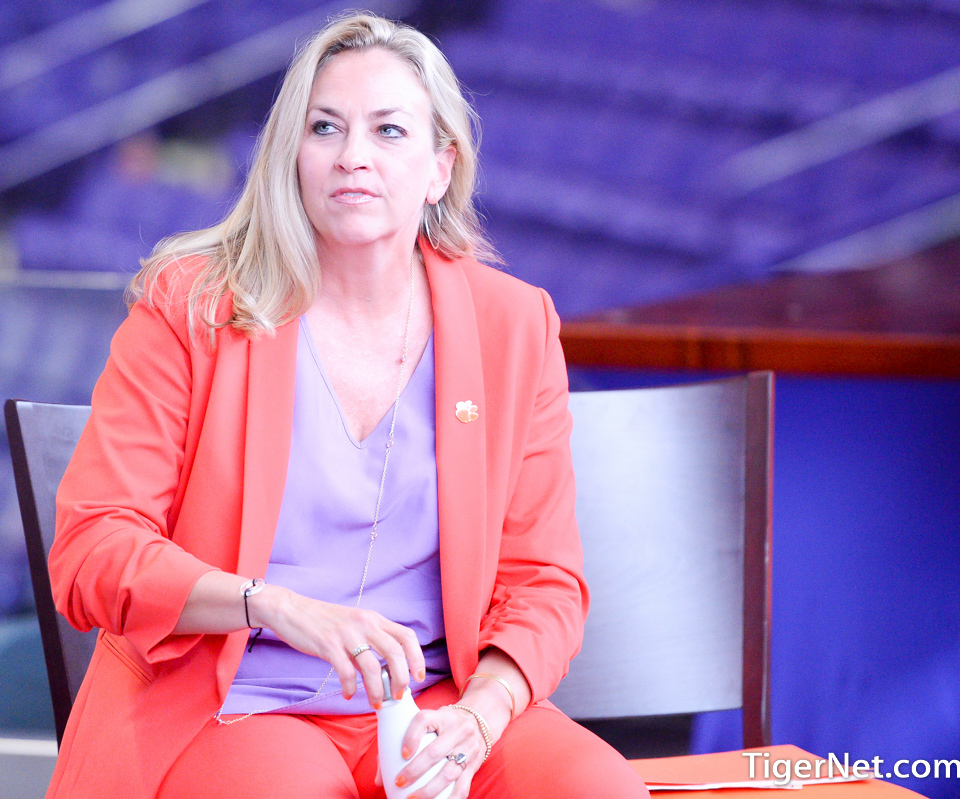
- Butler in 2018

Current position
- Title: Head coach
- Team: Charleston
- Conference: CAA
- Record: 0-0

Biographical details
- Born: March 6, 1972 (age 54); Mt. Juliet, Tennessee, U.S.

Playing career
- 1990–1994: Florida
- Position: Guard

Coaching career (HC unless noted)
- 1994–1997: Florida (Asst.)
- 1997–2001: Austin Peay (Asst.)
- 2001–2003: Charlotte (Asst.)
- 2003–2005: Charlotte (Assoc. HC)
- 2005–2007: Charlotte
- 2007–2017: Florida
- 2018–2024: Clemson
- 2024–2026: Louisville (Asst.)
- 2026–present: Charleston

Head coaching record
- Overall: 311–264 (.541)

Accomplishments and honors

Championships
- Atlantic 10 regular season (2006)

Awards
- Atlantic 10 Coach of the Year (2006); ACC Coach of the Year (2019)
Medal record
Women's basketball
Assistant Coach for United States
FIBA Under-19 World Championship
Gold medal – first place	2009 Bangkok	Team competition

Amanda Kay Butler (born March 6, 1972) is an American college basketball head coach for Charleston. In 2018, Butler was hired as the head coach of the Clemson Tigers women's basketball team. Prior to that, she was the head coach for the Florida Gators women's basketball team and the Charlotte 49ers women's basketball team.

== Career ==
Amanda Butler was born in Mt. Juliet, Tennessee, in 1972. She attended Mt. Juliet High School, graduating in 1990. She was recruited to play for the University of Florida by the Gators' head coach, Carol Ross, and started at guard for four years. After finishing her playing career in 1994, she transitioned into coaching. Her first coaching job was as an assistant coach at Florida, where she continued her education with a Master of Science degree in Exercise and Sport Science, in 1997. After leaving her job with Florida in 1997, she coached at Austin Peay from 1997 to 2001, and served as the associate head coach for former Charlotte head coach Katie Meier from 2001 to 2005.

Butler became the sixth head coach of the Charlotte 49ers women's basketball program on April 19, 2005. She was named Atlantic 10 Conference Coach of the Year after twenty wins and a share of the regular season championship in her first year as coach.

After Carolyn Peck was released as the Gators head coach following the 2006–07 season, Butler returned to her alma mater as the new head coach of the Gators women's basketball program on April 13, 2007. She was fired on March 6, 2017, her 45th birthday.

Butler then was hired on as head coach at Clemson. Butler led an incredible turnaround in her first year at Clemson. In their previous season, the Tigers finished 11–19 and 1–15 in ACC play. Butler led the team to a 9–7 ACC record and was voted the ACC Coach of the Year in 2018. The Tigers turnaround during Butler's first season marked the largest turnaround under a first-year head coach in ACC history. The turn around did not extend into the 2019–20 season as Clemson finished 8–23 overall and 3–15 in conference play. In the following years, Butler was unable to replicate her success from the first season as the Tigers never finished higher than tenth in the conference. Her second best season came in 2022–23 as the Tigers finished 19–16 overall, 7–11 in ACC play, and made it to the Super 16 of the WNIT. After the 2023–24 season, where the Tigers finished 12–19 overall and 5–13 in the ACC, Butler was fired as head coach.

On June 25, 2024, Butler was hired as an assistant coach to join Jeff Walz's staff at Louisville.

Butler was named head coach of Charleston on March 31, 2026.

== USA Basketball ==
In 2009, Butler served as an assistant coach to the U19 team, and competed in the FIBA Women's U19 World Championship. The USA lost the opening round game against Spain 90–86, but then went on to win their next eight games. In the quarterfinals, the USA team faced France, which held an eight-point lead late in the second half, but the USA team took back the lead and won by eleven to advance to the semifinals. After beating Canada in the semifinals, they had a rematch against Spain, for the championship. This time the USA jumped out to an early lead, with a score of 33–16 at the end of the first quarter. The USA went on to win 87–71 to win the gold medal.

== Head coaching record ==
Record table
Season	Team	Overall	Conference	Standing	Postseason
Charlotte 49ers (Atlantic 10 Conference) (2005–2007)
2005–06	Charlotte	21–9	13–3	T–1st	WNIT Second round
2006–07	Charlotte	19–13	9–5	T–4th	WNIT Second round
Charlotte:		40–22 (.645)	22–8 (.733)		
Florida Gators (Southeastern Conference) (2007–2017)
2007–08	Florida	19–14	6–8	T–7th	WNIT Third round
2008–09	Florida	24–8	9–5	T–4th	NCAA second round
2009–10	Florida	15–17	7–9	T–7th	WNIT Second round
2010–11	Florida	20–15	7–9	8th	WNIT Third round
2011–12	Florida	20–13	8–8	8th	NCAA second round
2012–13	Florida	22–15	6–10	T–8th	WNIT Semifinals
2013–14	Florida	20–13	8–8	5th	NCAA second round
2014–15	Florida	13–17	5–11	T–11th	
2015–16	Florida	22–9	10–6	T–4th	NCAA first round
2016–17	Florida	15–16	5–11	T–11th	
Florida:		190–136 (.581)	71–85 (.455)		
Clemson Tigers (Atlantic Coast Conference) (2018–2024)
2018–19	Clemson	20–13	9–7	7th	NCAA second round
2019–20	Clemson	8–23	3–15	14th	
2020–21	Clemson	12–14	5–12	11th	WNIT Second round
2021–22	Clemson	10–21	3–15	13th	
2022–23	Clemson	19–16	7–11	10th	WNIT Super 16
2023–24	Clemson	12–19	5–13	T–12th	
Clemson:		81–106 (.433)	32–73 (.305)		
Charleston Cougars (CAA) (2026–present)
2026–27	Charleston	0–0	0–0		
Charleston:		0–0 (–)	0–0 (–)		
Total:		311–264 (.541)			
National champion Postseason invitational champion Conference regular season champion Conference regular season and conference tournament champion Division regular season champion Division regular season and conference tournament champion Conference tournament champion

== Career statistics ==
Legend
GP	Games played	GS	Games started	MPG	Minutes per game	RPG	Rebounds per game
APG	Assists per game	SPG	Steals per game	BPG	Blocks per game	PPG	Points per game
TO	Turnovers per game	FG%	Field-goal percentage	3P%	3-point field-goal percentage	FT%	Free-throw percentage
**Bold**	Career best	°	League leader

=== College ===
Year	Team	GP	GS	MPG	FG%	3P%	FT%	RPG	APG	SPG	BPG	TO	PPG
1990–91	Florida	28	-	-	**41.2**	**31.8**	56.4	1.8	**5.5**	**1.4**	0.0	-	3.5
1991–92	Florida	28	-	-	30.4	25.6	64.3	**2.6**	3.7	1.0	**0.1**	-	4.3
1992–93	Florida	**29**	-	-	31.0	25.0	64.7	2.0	2.2	0.9	**0.1**	-	5.0
1993–94	Florida	**29**	-	-	33.7	28.9	**67.4**	**2.6**	2.8	1.2	**0.1**	-	**9.5**
**Career**		114	-	-	33.3	27.7	64.3	2.2	3.5	1.1	0.1	-	5.6
Statistics retrieved from Sports-Reference.

== See also ==
- Florida Gators
- History of the University of Florida
- List of University of Florida alumni
- University Athletic Association
