= Andrew McDermott (footballer) =

Scottish footballer

Personal information
- Full name: Andrew McDermott
- Date of birth: 1889
- Place of birth: Edinburgh, Scotland
- Date of death: 12 July 1915 (aged 26)
- Place of death: Gallipoli, Ottoman Turkey
- Position: Goalkeeper

Senior career*
Years	Team	Apps	(Gls)
–1910	Newtongrange Star		
1910–1913	Leith Athletic	4	(0)
- * Club domestic league appearances and goals

Andrew McDermott (1889 – 12 July 1915) was a Scottish professional footballer who played in the Scottish League for Leith Athletic as a goalkeeper.

== Personal life ==
McDermott worked as a lithographer. After the outbreak of the First World War in August 1914, McDermott enlisted in the Royal Scots. He was serving as an appointed lance corporal when he received facial wounds at Gallipoli on 28 June 1915, from which he died on 12 July 1915. He was commemorated on the Helles Memorial.
