= Paul McDermott (disambiguation) =

Paul McDermott is an Australian comedian.

Paul McDermott may also refer to:

- Paul McDermott (documentarian), Irish broadcaster
- Paul McDermott (judge) (born 1959), Irish judge
- Paul Anthony McDermott (1972–2019), Irish lawyer and academic
- Paul Mac (Paul Francis McDermott, born 1965), Australian electropop musician
