= Jimmy McDermott =

English footballer

Personal information
- Full name: James Lawrence McDermott
- Date of birth: 25 May 1932
- Place of birth: Earlestown, England
- Date of death: 29 August 2006 (aged 74)
- Place of death: Whiston, England
- Position: Winger

Senior career*
Years	Team	Apps	(Gls)
- Cromptons Recreation
1955–1959	Southport	157	(30)
1959–1961	Wigan Athletic	38	(12)
- * Club domestic league appearances and goals

James Lawrence McDermott (25 May 1932 – 29 August 2006) was an English professional footballer who played as a winger.

== Career ==
Born in Earlestown, McDermott made 157 appearances in the Football League for Southport. He also played in the Lancashire Combination for Cromptons Recreation and Wigan Athletic, scoring twice for the latter in 38 games.

McDermott died in Whiston.
