= John F. McDermott =

American psychiatrist

- Born: Hartford, Connecticut
- Education: Cornell University, A.B., 1947 - 1951; New York Medical College, 1951 - 1955
- Occupation: Psychiatrist
- Relatives: Sarah Noble Schemm (wife); Elizabeth C. (daughter); John F., III (son)
- Medical career
- Profession: Psychiatry
- Institutions: American Psychiatric Association; American Board of Psychiatry and Neurology

John F. McDermott is an American psychiatrist who lives in Honolulu, Hawaii. He is married to Sarah McDermott, and has two children - a boy named John F., III and a girl named Elizabeth C. He attended Cornell University and New York Medical College. He did his residency in Psychiatry and Child Psychiatry at the University of Michigan's Medical Center and Henry Ford Hospital and became a tenured professor of Child and Adolescent Psychiatry at the University of Michigan in Ann Arbor, Michigan. In 1969 he moved with his family to Hawaii where he founded and served as Professor and Chair of the Department of Psychiatry at the John A. Burns School of Medicine at the University of Hawaiʻi for 25 years. He has published twelve books, 150 peer reviewed scientific articles and contributed to a number of books and magazines, such as the New York Times Magazine and Parents Magazine. Some of his books include “Childhood Psychopathology: an anthology of basic readings", “People and Cultures of Hawaii: A Psychocultural Profile", and "Raising Cain (and Abel too): The Parents Book of Sibling Rivalry", which was praised for being easy for parents to understand. Andres Martin helped to create a mentorship program at the Journal of American Academy of Child and Adolescent Psychiatry for assistant editors in residence named after McDermott. He has participated in multiple organizations in the Hawaii area, including the Hawaii Opera Theater and the Hawaii Association for Children with Learning Disabilities.

== Biography ==
=== Early life ===
John F. McDermott was born in Hartford, Connecticut, to parents John "Mac" McDermott and Camilla Rose Cavanaugh. His father Mac, an orthopedic surgeon, was the son of Anna Cain and Patrick McDermott who came alone to the United States from Roscommon, Ireland at the age of eight. His mother Camilla Rose was the youngest daughter of Mary Seery and Martin James Cavanaugh, a justice of the Michigan Supreme Court.

=== Education ===
McDermott attended Kingswood School in Hartford, Connecticut, received his B.A. from Cornell University in 1951 and his M.D. from New York Medical College in 1955. McDermott worked as an intern at Henry Ford Hospital from 1955 to 1956, and went on to serve as resident in psychiatry for the University of Michigan Medical Center from 1956 to 1958 and resident in child psychiatry 1960–1962. From 1958 to 1960 he served as a lieutenant commander with the United States Naval Reserve, acting as chief of neuropsychiatry at the U.S. Naval Hospital in Key West, Florida.

=== Career ===
McDermott's career began at the University of Michigan in Ann Arbor, Michigan, where he was a tenured professor and up-and-coming clinician-scholar in the new field of child and adolescent psychiatry. . From 1960 to 1962, he served as a resident in child psychiatry for the University. He was also a director of inpatient services. In 1961, he had a fellowship in mental retardation in Letchworth Village in New York in 1961. He was the chief of neuropsychiatry at the U.S. Navy Hospital in Key West, Florida, from 1958 to 1960. From 1969 to 1995, McDermott served as the professor and chair of the Department of Psychiatry from 1975 to 1995 at the University of Hawaiʻi after having resigned from the University of Michigan. He helped develop the University's psychiatry clinical section into a medical school department, alongside Dr. Walter Char. He retired and was named professor emeritus.

=== Community service ===
McDermott has participated in a variety of different institutions in Hawaii, including the Hawaii Opera Theater on its board of directors, the Episcopal Diocese of Hawaii on its commission on anti-racism and cultural diversity, the Hawaii Association for Children with Learning Disabilities on its advisory board, and more.

== Psychological analysis ==
McDermott conducted an analysis of all of Emily Dickinson's poetry, their creation dates, biographical materials, and her letters due to speculation that she may have had mental health issues. He published his findings in the American Journal of Psychiatry under the title "Emily Dickinson Revisited: A Study of Periodicity in Her Work". He came to the conclusion that she may have suffered from bipolar disorder and seasonal changes in her productivity. The article was considered controversial according to author Paul Ruffin. He also did an analysis of the relationship between E.T. and Elliot from the film E.T.: The Extra Terrestrial. He stated: "E.T. looks like Elliot feels. He seems to express Elliot's own bottled-up loneliness as he gradually succumbs to the trauma of separation from a familiar milieu. E.T. is Elliot's alter ego. E.T. and Elliot are really one. They simply split into rescuer and victim as we move back and forth between them." The analysis was cited in the book “ Nursery Realms: Children in the Worlds of Science Fiction, Fantasy, and Horror.”

== Bibliography ==
- “Psychiatry for the pediatrician”
- "Childhood Psychopathology: an anthology of basic readings"
- "Mental Health Education in New Medical Schools"
- "Roles and Functions of Child Psychiatrists"
- "Psychiatric Treatment of the Child"
- "Adjustment in Intercultural Marriage"
- "Raising Cain (and Abel too): The Parents Book of Sibling Rivalry"
- "New Directions in Childhood Psychopathology Volume 1: Developmental Considerations"
- "People and Cultures of Hawaii: A Psychocultural Profile"
- "Culture, Mind and Therapy: Introduction to Cultural Psychiatry"
- "People and Cultures of Hawaii: The Evolution of Culture and Ethnicity"\

McDermott also contributed chapters to a number of other books and magazines, including an article titled “The Violent Bugs Bunny et al. for New York Times Magazine.

=== Licensing and certification ===
- Diplomate, National Board of Medical Examiners (1956)
- Diplomate, American Board of Psychiatry & Neurology (1962)
- Diplomate, American Board of Psychiatry & Neurology (1965)

== Recognition and accolades ==
Andres Martin, the Assistant Editor for the Journal of American Academy of Child and Adolescent Psychiatry, secured funds for a mentorship program after McDermott called the "John F. McDermott assistant editor in residence program". Naleen N. Andrade, M.D., the Chair of the Department of Psychiatry at the Jon A. Burns School of Medicine at the University of Hawaiʻi at Mānoa gave credit to McDermott – who she regards as a “great mentor in [her] life” - with her participation in academia. He has been published in a variety of books about psychiatry and psychology, including the book “Psychology Today Here to Help: Taming the Bipolar Discord”. He was also featured in the first volume of the “Dictionary of Modern American Philosophers”. The authors of “Chinese Culture and Mental Health” gave thanks to McDermott (among others) for helping make possible the book and the Conference on Chinese Culture and Mental Health held in Hawaii that lead to the creation of the book. His book “Raising Cain (and Abel too): The Parents Book of Sibling Rivalry” received praise from Abigail Van Buren for being easy to understand for parents. His work was quoted in an article for The New York Times by Lawrence Kutner that discusses the nature of teasing and how it relates to a parent-child relationship. His “The Violent Bugs Bunny et al.” article for The New York Times Magazine was cited by multiple books covering violence on television, including “Violence on Television: Congressional Inquiry, Public Criticism, and Industry Response”, “America Toons In: A History of Television Animation”, and “Saturday Morning Fever: Growing Up with Cartoon Culture”.
