= Hugh Joseph McDermott =

Australian engineer

Hugh Joseph McDermott is an electronics engineer with the Bionic Ear Institute of the University of Melbourne in East Melbourne, Australia. McDermott was named a Fellow of the Institute of Electrical and Electronics Engineers (IEEE) in 2012 for his contributions to improved sound processing techniques for cochlear implants and hearing aids.
