= Conor McDermott =

American football player (born 1992)

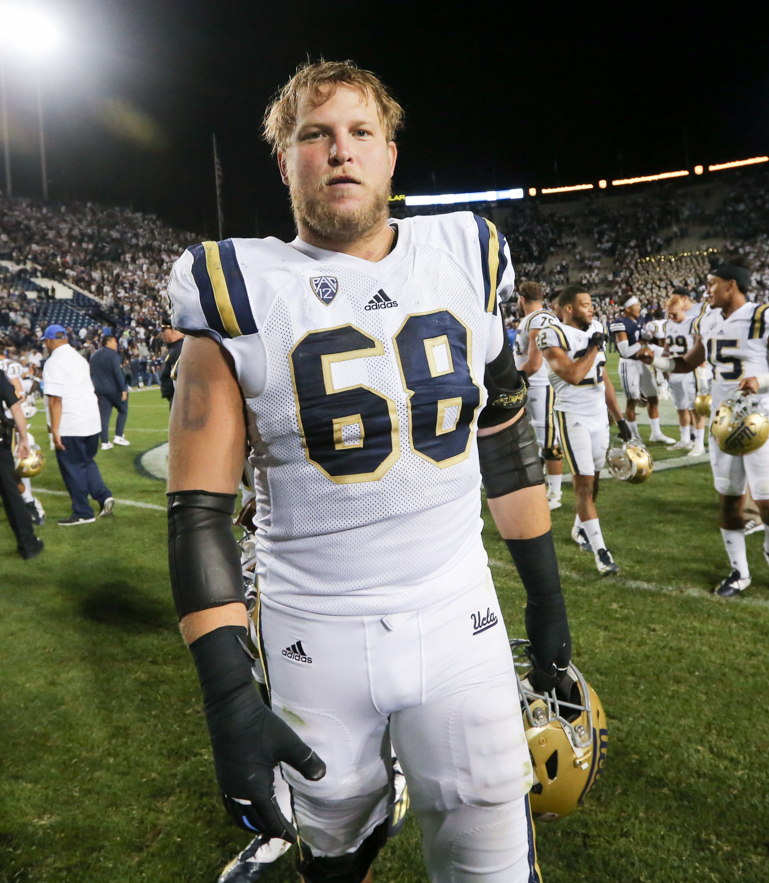
- McDermott with the UCLA Bruins in 2016

Profile
- Position: Offensive tackle

Personal information
- Born: October 19, 1992 (age 34); Nashville, Tennessee, U.S.
- Listed height: 6 ft 8 in (2.03 m)
- Listed weight: 305 lb (138 kg)

Career information
- High school: The Ensworth School (Nashville)
- College: UCLA (2012–2016)
- NFL draft: 2017: 6th round, 211th overall pick

Career history
- New England Patriots (2017)*; Buffalo Bills (2017–2019); New York Jets (2019–2022); New England Patriots (2022–2023); Los Angeles Rams (2024); Houston Texans (2025)*
- * Offseason or practice squad member only

Awards and highlights
- 2× Second-team All-Pac-12 (2015, 2016)

Career NFL statistics
- Games played: 55
- Games started: 17
- Receptions: 1
- Receiving yards: 1
- Receiving touchdowns: 1
- Stats at Pro Football Reference

Conor Francis McDermott (born October 19, 1992) is an American professional football offensive tackle. He played college football for the UCLA Bruins, and was selected by the New England Patriots in the sixth round of the 2017 NFL draft.

== Early life ==
McDermott was one of two sons born in Nashville, Tennessee to Kevin Sr. and Deborah McDermott. His brother Kevin Jr. later played football in college and their father played college basketball for South Dakota State.

McDermott attended the Ensworth School where he played tight end, offensive and defensive tackle positions during the course of his four years with the Tigers football team. In 2010, McDermott and his team won the State championship, with McDermott being named to the All-Conference team. By the end of his high school career, McDermott helped his team compile a 39-8 win-loss record.

From 2009 to 2011, McDermott also played basketball. During those three seasons, McDermott served as team captain. The Ensworth Tigers won the state championship in 2009 and was later ranked No. 1 in the state in 2011. During his senior season, McDermott averaged 15.2 points per game and 8.5 rebounds per game. He earned Division II-AA and All-Mid-State first team selection honors.

== College career ==
McDermott joined the Bruins football team playing for the University of California, Los Angeles in 2012, the same year in which his brother played his last season for the team as a long snapper. During his freshman year, McDermott earned a place on the UCLA Athletic Director's Academic Honor Roll. McDermott did not play until the 2014 season after previously being held on reserve as an offensive tackle. He only played in the last seven games of that season, starting as a tight end. By the 2015 season, McDermott started in 12 games as a tackle. During his final season in 2016, McDermott started in 12 games as a left tackle. While at UCLA, McDermott studied Political Science.

== Professional career ==
Pre-draft measurables
Height	Weight	Arm length	Hand span	40-yard dash	10-yard split	20-yard split	20-yard shuttle	Three-cone drill	Vertical jump	Broad jump	Bench press
6 ft 8 1/8 in (2.04 m)	307 lb (139 kg)	34 3/4 in (0.88 m)	11 in (0.28 m)	5.18 s	1.81 s	3.01 s	4.58 s	7.52 s	28.5 in (0.72 m)	8 ft 9 in (2.67 m)	22 reps

=== New England Patriots (first stint) ===
The New England Patriots selected McDermott in the sixth round (211th overall) of the 2017 NFL draft. He was waived on September 2, 2017.

=== Buffalo Bills ===
On September 3, 2017, McDermott was claimed off waivers by the Buffalo Bills.

On October 3, 2019, McDermott was waived by the Bills.

=== New York Jets ===
On October 4, 2019, McDermott was claimed off waivers by the New York Jets.

On November 20, 2020, McDermott signed a one-year contract extension with the Jets.

On September 1, 2021, McDermott was placed on injured reserve. He was activated on November 13. In a December 26 game against the Jacksonville Jaguars, McDermott recorded the first touchdown of his career, catching a pass from Zach Wilson to extend the Jets' lead in the game.

On March 9, 2022, McDermott re-signed with the Jets. McDermott was waived during final roster cuts on August 30. He was released on October 17 and re-signed to the practice squad.

=== New England Patriots (second stint) ===
On November 22, 2022, McDermott was signed by the Patriots off the Jets practice squad. He was named the starting right tackle and started the final six games of the season.

On February 22, 2023, McDermott signed a two-year contract extension with the Patriots. He was placed on injured reserve on August 29. McDermott was released on September 8. The Patriots re-signed him to the practice squad on October 17. He was signed to the active roster on November 25. On April 29, 2024, McDermott was released by the Patriots.

=== Los Angeles Rams ===
On August 6, 2024, McDermott signed with the Los Angeles Rams. He was placed on injured reserve on August 28.

=== Houston Texans ===
On August 12, 2025, McDermott signed with the Houston Texans. He was released on August 26 as part of final roster cuts.

== Personal life ==
His older brother, Kevin McDermott, also played college football at UCLA and is the former starting long snapper for the Minnesota Vikings.

McDermott has stated he is a fan of basketball player Amar'e Stoudemire. During his senior season in 2016, McDermott pranked his UCLA teammate Eddie Vanderdoes by signing the back of his jersey during a fan appreciation event.
