= Raina Perez =

American basketball player (born 1998)

Portland State Vikings
- Title: Assistant coach
- Conference: Big West

Personal information
- Born: July 30, 1998 (age 28) Goodyear, Arizona, U.S.
- Listed height: 5 ft 4 in (1.63 m)

Career information
- High school: Millennium (Goodyear, Arizona)
- College: Northern Arizona (2016–2017); Cal State Fullerton (2017–2020); NC State (2020–2022)
- WNBA draft: 2022: undrafted
- Playing career: 2022–2022
- Position: Guard
- Coaching career: 2023–present

Career history

Playing
- 2022: Seattle Storm

Coaching
- 2023–24: UC Riverside (assistant)
- 2024–25: Rice (assistant)
- 2025–present: Portland State (assistant)

Career highlights
- Big West Player of the Year (2020); All-Big West First Team (2020)
- Stats at Basketball Reference

Raina Perez (born July 30, 1998) is an American former professional basketball player and current coach, who is an assistant coach for the Portland State Vikings women's basketball team. She played college basketball at NC State, Cal State Fullerton, and Northern Arizona.

== College career ==
=== Northern Arizona ===
During her freshman season, Perez was one of four players on the team to appear in every game. She averaged 10.1 points, 2.1 rebounds, and 2.3 assists. At the end of the year, Perez was the top scoring freshman in the conference.

Following her freshman season, Perez decided to transfer to Cal State Fullerton.

=== Cal State Fullerton ===
Perez spent three years at Cal State Fullerton. She redshirted during the 2017–2018 season due to NCAA Transfer rules. During the 2018–2019 season, Perez was named to the All-Big West Honorable Mention Team. She tied for the team lead in scoring at 13.0 points, while also adding in 5.0 assists and 1.5 steals.

During her junior season, Perez was a dominant player for the Titans. She increased her averages to 19.8 points, 5.4 rebounds, and 4.2 assists. Her play was recognized by the Big West, as she was named the Big West Player of the Year and to the Big West First Team. She was the first Titan player to win the Player of the Year Award since the 1990–91 season.

After the season, Perez transferred to NC State.

=== NC State ===
During her first season as a member of the Wolfpack, Perez was named to the All-ACC Honorable Mention Team. She averaged 9.5 points, 3.4 rebounds, and 4.7 assists, while starting in 23 of the games. She was also a Top 10 Finalist for the Nancy Lieberman Award, which honors the nation's best point guard. She hit the game-winning shot in the ACC Tournament Final to help NC State win their second straight ACC Title.

Perez came back for an extra year due to the COVID-19 pandemic and helped guide the Wolfpack to the NCAA Elite Eight. She averaged 8.6 points, 3.1 assists, and 1.1 steals, while starting all 36 games. Perez also once again was clutch in late-game situations - this time in the NCAA Tournament. Perez got a steal and layup with 14 seconds left against Notre Dame in the Sweet Sixteen to put NC State up in the last seconds.

== College statistics ==
Year	Team	GP	Points	FG%	3P%	FT%	RPG	APG	SPG	BPG	PPG
2016–17	Northern Arizona	29	290	.369	.286	.857	2.0	2.1	0.6	0.2	10.0
2018–19	Cal State Fullerton	29	377	.421	.317	.806	2.5	5.0	1.4	0.0	13.0
2019–20	Cal State Fullerton	31	610	.462	.350	.820	5.2	4.2	1.6	0.2	19.7
2020–21	NC State	25	237	.473	.353	.820	3.4	4.7	0.9	0.0	9.5
2021–22	NC State	36	311	.441	.386	.917	2.7	3.1	1.1	0.1	8.6
Career		150	1825	.434	.335	.829	3.2	3.8	1.1	0.1	12.2

== Professional career ==
=== Seattle Storm ===
Perez went undrafted in the 2022 WNBA draft, but signed a training camp contract with the Seattle Storm. She was waived on May 2, 2022, during camp. Perez was brought back on May 11, 2022, as a hardship contract with the Storm.

== WNBA career statistics ==
Legend
GP	Games played	GS	Games started	MPG	Minutes per game	RPG	Rebounds per game
APG	Assists per game	SPG	Steals per game	BPG	Blocks per game	PPG	Points per game
TO	Turnovers per game	FG%	Field-goal percentage	3P%	3-point field-goal percentage	FT%	Free-throw percentage
**Bold**	Career best	°	League leader

=== Regular season ===
Year	Team	GP	GS	MPG	FG%	3P%	FT%	RPG	APG	SPG	BPG	TO	PPG
2022	Seattle	1	0	2.0	.000	.000	.000	0.0	1.0	0.0	0.0	0.0	0.0
Career	1 year, 1 team	1	0	2.0	.000	.000	.000	0.0	1.0	0.0	0.0	0.0	0.0
