= Brian McDermott =

Brian McDermott may refer to:

- Brian McDermott (footballer) (born 1961), footballer and former manager of Reading F.C.
- Brian McDermott (rugby league) (born 1970), footballer and coach of Leeds Rhinos
- Brian McDermott (murder victim), child who was murdered in Belfast in 1973, case still unsolved
