= Steve McDermott (footballer) =

English footballer

Personal information
- Full name: Steven McDermott
- Date of birth: 30 December 1964
- Place of birth: Gateshead, England
- Position: Forward

Youth career
- –: Sunderland

Senior career*
Years	Team	Apps	(Gls)
1982–1983	Darlington	2	(0)
–	Esh Winning		
- * Club domestic league appearances and goals

Steven McDermott (born 30 December 1964) is an English former footballer who played as a forward in the Football League for Darlington. He was an apprentice with Sunderland, and also played non-league football for Esh Winning. McDermott joined Darlington in November 1982, and made two substitute appearances for the club, both 2–0 defeats in the Fourth Division, on 4 December 1982 at home to Wimbledon and in their next match, away to Hartlepools United.
