= 2020–21 NCAA Division I women's basketball season =

American women's college basketball season

- Preseason AP No. 1: South Carolina Gamecocks
- Regular season: November 2020 – March 2021
- NCAA Tournament: 2021
- Tournament dates: March 26 – April 4, 2021
- National Championship: Alamodome; San Antonio, Texas
- NCAA Champions: Stanford Cardinal
- Other champions: Rice Owls (WNIT); Cleveland State Vikings (WBI)
- Player of the Year (Naismith, Wooden): Paige Bueckers, UConn Huskies (Naismith, Wooden); NaLyssa Smith, Baylor Bears (Wade)

The 2020–21 NCAA Division I women's basketball season began in November 2020 and ended with the championship game of the 2021 NCAA Division I women's basketball tournament at the Alamodome in San Antonio, Texas on April 4, 2021. Practices officially began in October 2020.

== Season headlines ==
- September 17 – The NCAA officially announced that both men's and women's basketball season is permitted to begin on November 25.
- September 24 – One week after the NCAA's announcement, the Pac-12 permitted play to begin on that date. The Pac-12 had previously barred play until 2021. This ruling left the Ivy League as the only conference not yet allowing play to begin on November 25.
- October 14 – The NCAA announced that all student-athletes in winter sports during the 2020–21 school year, including men's and women's basketball, would receive an extra year of athletic eligibility, whether or not they or their teams play during that school year.
- October 27 – Bethune–Cookman, which had previously canceled its 2020 fall sports due to COVID-19 concerns, announced that none of its other teams, including men's and women's basketball, would play in the 2020–21 school year.
- November 12
  - Cal State Northridge announced that it would not play in the 2020–21 season after six players opted out of the season and a seventh was unable to enter the U.S. due to travel restrictions, leaving the Matadors with only six available players.
  - The Ivy League became the first conference to cancel all winter sports for the 2020–21 season, including men's and women's basketball, due to COVID-19 concerns.
- November 19 – Maryland Eastern Shore became the second MEAC program to opt out of all remaining 2020–21 sports, including men's and women's basketball, due to COVID-19 concerns.
- November 23 – Florida A&M became the third MEAC member to opt out of the 2020–21 season due to COVID-19 concerns. Unlike the previous two MEAC members to opt out, FAMU only opted out of women's basketball at that time.
- December 14 – The NCAA announces that the 2021 NCAA Division I women's basketball tournament would be held in one geographic area. The original host of the Final Four, San Antonio, and surrounding areas began preliminary discussions to host the entire 64-team tournament.
- December 25 – Duke University canceled the remainder of its women's basketball season, citing player concerns over COVID-19.
- December 29 – Southern Methodist University canceled the remainder of its women's basketball season, citing player concerns over COVID-19.
- December 31 - South Carolina makes a claim to the 2019–20 season mythical national championship based on poll results in the SEC season-opener against Florida.
- January 6 – Dixie State University canceled the remainder of its women's basketball season, citing player concerns over COVID-19.
- January 14
  - The University of Virginia canceled the remainder of its women's basketball season, citing player concerns over COVID-19.
  - San Jose State University canceled the remainder of its women's basketball season, citing player concerns over COVID-19.
- January 18 – Vanderbilt University canceled the remainder of its women's basketball season, citing player concerns over COVID-19.
- January 21 – The University of Detroit Mercy canceled the remainder of its women's basketball season. The school's announcement came four days after the parents of all 14 players sent a letter to UDM athletic director Robert Vowels Jr. alleging rampant player mistreatment by first-year head coach AnnMarie Gilbert.
- January 24 – The University of Vermont canceled the remainder of its women's basketball season, citing player concerns over COVID-19.
- January 29 – UMBC canceled the remainder of its women's basketball season, citing player concerns over COVID-19.
- February 3 – South Carolina State University canceled the remainder of its women's basketball season, citing player concerns over COVID-19.
- February 4 – Canisius College canceled the remainder of its women's basketball season, citing player concerns over COVID-19.
- February 10 – The University of Hartford canceled the remainder of its women's basketball season, citing player concerns over COVID-19.
- February 12 – The College of William & Mary canceled the remainder of its women's basketball season, citing player concerns over COVID-19.
- February 18 – Colgate University canceled the remainder of its women's basketball season, citing player concerns over COVID-19.
- February 23 – St. Francis (BKN) canceled the remainder of its women's basketball season, citing player concerns over COVID-19.
- February 25 – The University of San Diego canceled the remainder of its women's basketball season, citing player concerns over COVID-19.
- March 2 – Hampton University canceled the remainder of its women's basketball season, citing player concerns over COVID-19.
- March 3 – Delaware State University canceled the remainder of its women's basketball season, citing player concerns over COVID-19.

=== Milestones and records ===
- January 9 – In what was believed to be the first-ever coaching matchup of a father and daughter in Division I basketball, Holy Cross, coached by Maureen Magarity, defeated Army, coached by her father Dave Magarity, 80–46.
- January 28 – In an 83–71 upset of then-#2 NC State, Virginia Tech set a new Division I women's record for most points in an overtime period with 26, which also tied the D-I men's mark.

== Conference membership changes ==
Ten schools joined new conferences for the 2020–21 season, including four transitioning from Division II.

School	Former conference	New conference
Bellarmine	Great Lakes Valley Conference (D-II)	ASUN Conference
Cal State Bakersfield	Western Athletic Conference	Big West Conference
Dixie State	Rocky Mountain Athletic Conference (D-II)	Western Athletic Conference
Kansas City	Western Athletic Conference	Summit League
NJIT	ASUN Conference	America East Conference
Purdue Fort Wayne	Summit League	Horizon League
Robert Morris	Northeast Conference	Horizon League
Tarleton State	Lone Star Conference (D-II)	Western Athletic Conference
UC San Diego	California Collegiate Athletic Association (D-II)	Big West Conference
UConn	American Athletic Conference	Big East Conference

== Arenas ==
=== New arenas ===
- James Madison opened Atlantic Union Bank Center on November 25, 2020, with a men's and women's doubleheader. The women defeated Mount St. Mary's 69–55 in the second game.
- Liberty won the first event in Liberty Arena, which had officially opened on November 23, 2020, with a 76–53 win over Norfolk State on December 1.

=== Arenas of new D-I teams ===
Three of the four new D-I members for this season use existing on-campus facilities:

- Dixie State plays in Burns Arena.
- Tarleton State plays in Wisdom Gym.
- UC San Diego plays in RIMAC Arena.

The other D-I newcomer, Bellarmine, announced a multi-year deal with the Kentucky State Fair Board on November 2, 2020, to play home games at Freedom Hall, located at the Kentucky Exposition Center near Louisville Muhammad Ali International Airport. Before the opening of the downtown KFC Yum! Center in 2010, Freedom Hall had been the full-time home of Louisville men's basketball for more than 50 years, and had also been at least the part-time home of Louisville women's basketball since that team's establishment in 1975. Due to COVID-19 restrictions, Bellarmine could only seat 300 at its on-campus facility, Knights Hall. With Freedom Hall's basketball capacity of 18,252, the Knights were able to seat 2,700.

=== Arenas closing ===
- High Point had originally planned to open Nido and Mariana Qubein Arena and Conference Center for the 2020–21 season. However, construction delays brought on by COVID-19 led to the university delaying the new arena's opening until 2021–22, meaning that the Millis Center was used for one more season.
- This was originally intended to be Idaho's final season at the Kibbie Dome, also home to Idaho football, with the facility's basketball configuration known as Cowan Spectrum. When Idaho football moved its 2020 season to spring 2021, it forced Idaho men's and women's basketball to move their entire home schedules to Memorial Gymnasium, which had been a secondary home to both teams since the Kibbie Dome opened in 1976, as well as the full-time home to both before that time. The school plans to open the new Idaho Central Credit Union Arena for the 2021–22 season. The Dome will remain in use for football and several other sports.

=== Temporary arenas ===
To be added.

== Season outlook ==
=== Pre-season polls ===
The top 25 from the AP and USA Today Coaches Polls.

Associated Press
Ranking	Team
1	South Carolina (29)
2	Stanford (1)
3	UConn
4	Baylor
5	Louisville
6	Mississippi State
7	Arizona
8	NC State
9	UCLA
10	Oregon
11	Kentucky
12	Maryland
13	Texas A&M
14	Arkansas
15	Iowa State
16	Indiana
17	Northwestern
18	Oregon State
19	DePaul
20	Ohio State
21	Gonzaga
22	Notre Dame
23	Syracuse
24	Missouri State
25	Michigan

USA Today Coaches
Ranking	Team
1	South Carolina (31)
2	Stanford (1)
3	UConn
4	Baylor
5	Louisville
6	NC State
7	Mississippi State
8	Arizona
9	Oregon
10	UCLA
11	Maryland
12	Kentucky
13	Texas A&M
14	Arkansas
15	Indiana
16	Northwestern
17	Oregon State
18	Iowa State
19	DePaul
20	Gonzaga
21	Syracuse
22	Ohio State
23	Notre Dame
24	Michigan
25	Missouri State

== Regular season ==
=== Early season tournaments ===
Early season tournaments are TBA, although many have canceled and others are unlikely to occur.

=== Upsets ===
An upset is a victory by an underdog team. In the context of NCAA Division I Women's Basketball, this generally constitutes an unranked team defeating a team currently ranked in the Top 25. This list will highlight those upsets of ranked teams by unranked teams as well as upsets of #1 teams. Rankings are from the AP poll. Bold type indicates winning teams in "true road games"—i.e., those played on an opponent's home court (including secondary homes).

Winner	Score	Loser	Date	Tournament/Event
Ohio	86–85	#22 Notre Dame	November 27, 2020	
South Dakota State	76–69	#15 Iowa State	November 28, 2020	
Wake Forest	68–59	#24 Missouri State	November 29, 2020	Gulf Coast Showcase
**#8 NC State**	54–46	#1 South Carolina	December 3, 2020	Jimmy V Classic
South Florida	67–63^{OT}	#6 Mississippi State	December 5, 2020	
South Dakota State	75–72^{OT}	#18 Gonzaga	December 6, 2020	
**Utah**	85–79	#15 Oregon State	December 8, 2020	
Kansas State	62–53	#22 South Dakota State	December 10, 2020	
Northern Iowa	65–48	#22 South Dakota State	December 12, 2020	
North Carolina	92–68	#18 Syracuse	December 17, 2020	
**Tennessee**	66–58	#15 Indiana	December 17, 2020	
**South Dakota State**	60–52	#20 Missouri State	December 19, 2020	
Washington State	61–55	#21 Oregon State	December 19, 2020	
Nebraska	65–63	#15 Northwestern	December 31, 2020	
Tennessee	88–73	#13 Arkansas	January 7, 2021	
Washington State	71–69^{OT}	#7 Arizona	January 10, 2021	
**Nebraska**	68–64	#23 Michigan State	January 10, 2021	
**Georgia**	67–66	#23 Tennessee	January 14, 2021	
LSU	65–61^{OT}	#7 Texas A&M	January 14, 2021	
**Alabama**	86–78	#14 Mississippi State	January 14, 2021	
USC	81–77^{OT}	#25 Washington State	January 15, 2021	
Nebraska	63–55	#15 Ohio State	January 16, 2021	
**Iowa State**	75–71	#6 Baylor	January 16, 2021	
Colorado	77–72^{OT}	#1 Stanford	January 17, 2021	
Texas Tech	74–66	#21 Texas	January 17, 2021	
**Texas**	70–59	#24 Iowa State	January 23, 2021	
Clemson	86–77^{OT}	#23 Syracuse	January 24, 2021	
Virginia Tech	83–71^{OT}	#2 NC State	January 28, 2021	
**LSU**	60–52	#22 Georgia	January 28, 2021	
**#4 NC State**	74–60	#1 Louisville	February 1, 2021	
Ole Miss	72–60	#15 Kentucky	February 4, 2021	
Washington State	67–63	#5 UCLA	February 5, 2021	
North Carolina	76–69	#4 NC State	February 7, 2021	Rivalry
#2 UConn	63–59^{OT}	#1 South Carolina	February 8, 2021	
Wisconsin	75–70	#12 Ohio State	February 10, 2021	
**Rutgers**	70–54	#21 Northwestern	February 10, 2021	
**Oklahoma**	72–71	#19 West Virginia	February 13, 2021	
**Nebraska**	71–64	#24 Northwestern	February 17, 2021	
BYU	61–56	#16 Gonzaga	February 18, 2021	
**Creighton**	83–72	#19 DePaul	February 20, 2021	
Florida State	68–59	#3 Louisville	February 21, 2021	
**Oregon State**	71–64	#8 UCLA	February 21, 2021	
Penn State	69–67	#15 Ohio State	February 24, 2021	
**Marquette**	85–71	#24 DePaul	February 24, 2021	
Iowa State	85–68	#18 West Virginia	February 24, 2021	
Iowa	89–67	#12 Michigan	February 25, 2021	
Houston	67–49	#13 South Florida	February 27, 2021	
**Ole Miss**	73–69	#19 Kentucky	February 28, 2021	
Arizona State	66–64^{OT}	#9 Arizona	February 28, 2021	
**Oregon State**	88–77	#14 Oregon	February 28, 2021	Rivalry
**Butler**	86–81	#25 DePaul	March 1, 2021	
Oregon State	71–64	#19 Oregon	March 4, 2021	Rivalry/Pac-12 Tournament
UCF	58–45	#15 South Florida	March 4, 2021	War on I-4
Ole Miss	69–60	#13 Arkansas	March 4, 2021	SEC tournament
Omaha	52–40	#21 South Dakota State	March 6, 2021	Summit League Tournament
Villanova	78–72	#25 DePaul	March 6, 2021	Big East tournament
Northwestern	65–49	#13 Michigan	March 11, 2021	Big Ten tournament
Michigan State	69–61	#9 Indiana	March 11, 2021	Big Ten tournament
Iowa	73–62	#19 Rutgers	March 11, 2021	Big Ten tournament

=== Conference winners and tournaments ===
Each of the 31 Division I athletic conferences that played in 2020–21 ended its regular season with a single-elimination tournament. The team with the best regular-season record in each conference was given the number one seed in each tournament, with tiebreakers used as needed in the case of ties for the top seeding. Unless otherwise noted, the winners of these tournaments received automatic invitations to the 2021 NCAA Division I women's basketball tournament.

Conference	Regular season first place	Conference player of the year	Conference Coach of the Year	Conference tournament	Tournament venue (city)	Tournament winner
America East Conference	Maine	Blanca Millán, Maine	Amy Vachon, Maine	2021 America East women's basketball tournament	Campus sites	Stony Brook
American Athletic Conference	South Florida	IImar'I Thomas, Cincinnati	Jose Fernandez, South Florida	2021 American Athletic Conference women's basketball tournament	Dickies Arena (Fort Worth, TX)	South Florida
ASUN Conference	Florida Gulf Coast	Kierstan Bell, Florida Gulf Coast	Karl Smesko, Florida Gulf Coast	2021 ASUN women's basketball tournament	KSU Convocation Center (Kennesaw, GA)	Florida Gulf Coast
Atlantic 10 Conference	Dayton	Anna DeWolfe, Fordham & Emmanuelle Tahane, Rhode Island	Tammi Reiss, Rhode Island	2021 Atlantic 10 women's basketball tournament	Siegel Center; Richmond, VA	VCU
Atlantic Coast Conference	Louisville	Dana Evans, Louisville (coaches & media)	Wes Moore, NC State (coaches); Nell Fortner, Georgia Tech (media)	2021 ACC women's basketball tournament	Greensboro Coliseum (Greensboro, NC)	NC State
Big 12 Conference	Baylor	NaLyssa Smith, Baylor	Jim Littell, Oklahoma State	2021 Big 12 Conference women's basketball tournament	Municipal Auditorium (Kansas City, MO)	Baylor
Big East Conference	UConn	Paige Bueckers, UConn	Geno Auriemma, UConn	2021 Big East women's basketball tournament	Mohegan Sun Arena (Uncasville, CT)	UConn
Big Sky Conference	Idaho State	Alisha Davis, Northern Colorado	Tricia Binford, Montana & Seton Sobolewski, Idaho State	2021 Big Sky Conference women's basketball tournament	Idaho Central Arena (Boise, ID)	Idaho State
Big South Conference	Longwood	Skyler Curran, High Point	Chelsea Banbury, High Point	2021 Big South Conference women's basketball tournament	Campus sites	High Point
Big Ten Conference	Maryland	Naz Hillmon, Michigan	Brenda Frese, Maryland	2021 Big Ten women's basketball tournament	Bankers Life Fieldhouse (Indianapolis, IN)	Maryland
Big West Conference	UC Davis	Cierra Hall, UC Davis	Jennifer Gross, UC Davis & Tamara Inoue, UC Irvine	2021 Big West Conference women's basketball tournament	Michelob Ultra Arena (Paradise, NV)	UC Davis
Colonial Athletic Association	Delaware	Jasmine Dickey, Delaware	Natasha Adair, Delaware	2021 CAA women's basketball tournament	Schar Center (Elon, NC)	Drexel
Conference USA	Rice (West) and Middle Tennessee (East) (Note: These conferences chose to seed their tournament by division, with both divisional champions being top seeds in different halves of the bracket.)	Anastasia Hayes, Middle Tennessee	Jesyka Burks-Wiley, FIU	2021 Conference USA women's basketball tournament	Ford Center (Frisco, TX)	Middle Tennessee
Horizon League	Milwaukee & Wright State (Note: Top seed in conference tournament.)	Macee Williams, IUPUI	Katrina Merriweather, Wright State	2021 Horizon League women's basketball tournament	Quarterfinals: Campus sites Semifinals and final: Indiana Farmers Coliseum (Indianapolis, IN)	Wright State
Ivy League	No Ivy League season held due to COVID-19 concerns					
Metro Atlantic Athletic Conference	Marist	Mackenzie DeWees, Quinnipiac	Brian Giorgis, Marist & Marc Mitchell, Saint Peter's	2021 MAAC women's basketball tournament	Boardwalk Hall (Atlantic City, NJ)	Marist
Mid-American Conference	Bowling Green	Cece Hooks, Ohio	Robyn Fralick, Bowling Green	2021 Mid-American Conference women's basketball tournament	Rocket Mortgage FieldHouse (Cleveland, OH)	Central Michigan
Mid-Eastern Athletic Conference	Howard (North) and North Carolina A&T (South)	Jayla Thornton, Howard	Ty Grace, Howard	2021 MEAC women's basketball tournament	Norfolk Scope (Norfolk, VA)	North Carolina A&T
Missouri Valley Conference	Missouri State	Brice Calip, Missouri State	Amaka Agugua-Hamilton, Missouri State	2021 Missouri Valley Conference women's basketball tournament	TaxSlayer Center (Moline, IL)	Bradley
Mountain West Conference	Colorado State	Haley Cavinder, Fresno State	Lindy La Rocque, UNLV	2021 Mountain West Conference women's basketball tournament	Thomas & Mack Center (Paradise, NV)	Wyoming
Northeast Conference	Mount St. Mary's	Kendall Bresee, Mount St. Mary's	Maria Marchesano, Mount St. Mary's	2021 Northeast Conference women's basketball tournament	Campus sites	Mount St. Mary's
Ohio Valley Conference	UT Martin	Chelsey Perry, UT Martin	Kevin McMillan, UT Martin	2021 Ohio Valley Conference women's basketball tournament	Ford Center (Evansville, IN)	Belmont
Pac-12 Conference	Stanford	Aari McDonald, Arizona	Tara VanDerveer, Stanford	2021 Pac-12 Conference women's basketball tournament	Michelob Ultra Arena (Paradise, NV)	Stanford
Patriot League	Bucknell	Natalie Kucowski, Lafayette	Trevor Woodruff, Bucknell	2021 Patriot League women's basketball tournament	Campus sites	Lehigh
Southeastern Conference	Texas A&M	Rhyne Howard, Kentucky	Joni Taylor, Georgia	2021 SEC women's basketball tournament	Bon Secours Wellness Arena (Greenville, SC)	South Carolina
Southern Conference	Samford	Andrea Cournoyer, Samford	Carley Kuhns, Samford	2021 Southern Conference women's basketball tournament	Harrah's Cherokee Center (Asheville, NC)	Mercer
Southland Conference	Stephen F. Austin	Amber Leggett, Sam Houston	Mark Kellogg, Stephen F. Austin	2021 Southland Conference women's basketball tournament	Leonard E. Merrell Center (Katy, TX)	Stephen F. Austin
Southwestern Athletic Conference	Jackson State	Dayzsha Logan, Jackson State	Freda Freeman-Jackson, Alabama State	2021 SWAC women's basketball tournament	Bartow Arena (Birmingham, AL)	Jackson State
Summit League	South Dakota State	Myah Selland, South Dakota State	Aaron Johnston, South Dakota State	2021 Summit League women's basketball tournament	Sanford Pentagon (Sioux Falls, SD)	South Dakota
Sun Belt Conference	Louisiana (West) and Troy (East)	Alexus Dye, Troy	Chanda Rigby, Troy	2021 Sun Belt Conference women's basketball tournament	Hartsell Arena & Pensacola Bay Center (Pensacola, FL)	Troy
West Coast Conference	Gonzaga	Shaylee Gonzales, BYU & Jenn Wirth, Gonzaga	Jeff Judkins, BYU	2021 West Coast Conference women's basketball tournament	Orleans Arena (Paradise, NV)	Gonzaga
Western Athletic Conference	California Baptist	Ane Olaeta, California Baptist	Jarrod Olson, California Baptist	2021 WAC women's basketball tournament	Orleans Arena (Paradise, NV)	California Baptist (Note: California Baptist, which was unbeaten after the WAC tournament, was ineligible for the NCAA tournament because it was in the third year of a four-year transition from NCAA Division II. Prior to the tournament, the WAC announced that if California Baptist won the tournament, the conference's automatic bid would go to the regular-season second-place finisher, Utah Valley.)

=== Statistical leaders ===
**Points per game**			**Rebounds per game**			**Assists per game**			**Steals per game**		
Player	School	PPG	Player	School	RPG	Player	School	APG	Player	School	SPG
Caitlin Clark	Iowa	26.6	Natalie Kucowski	Lafayette	13.3	Tiana Mangakahia	Syracuse	7.2	Veronica Burton	Northwestern	3.84
Anastasia Hayes	Middle Tennessee	26.5	Dariauna Lewis	Alabama A&M	13.0	Caitlin Clark	Iowa	7.1	Valerie Higgins	Pacific	3.82
Cece Hooks	Ohio	25.1	Oshlynn Brown; Bethy Mununga	Ball State; South Florida	12.9	Mayra Caicedo; Rachel Hakes	Little Rock; Fairfield	6.7	Cece Hooks	Ohio	3.76
Kierstan Bell	Florida Gulf Coast	24.3	Unique Thompson	Auburn	12.8	Aleah Nelson; Destiney Philoxy; Elisa Pinzan	Towson; UMass; South Florida	6.5	Juana Camilion	Iona	3.47
Ashley Joens	Iowa State	24.2	Alexus Dye; Lauren Gustin	Troy; BYU	12.6	DiDi Richards	Baylor	6.3	Bree Calhoun	Seattle	3.32

**Blocked shots per game**			**Field goal percentage**			**Three-point field goal percentage**			**Free throw percentage**		
Player	School	BPG	Player	School	FG%	Player	School	3FG%	Player	School	FT%
Natasha Mack	Oklahoma State	4.00	Monika Czinano	Iowa	.668	Katie Benzan	Maryland	.500	Dani Haskell	Canisius	.941
Latrese Saine	Southeast Missouri State	3.96	Naz Hillmon	Michigan	.623	Aleah Goodman	Oregon State	.490	Brandi Bisping	Milwaukee	.935
Nancy Mulkey; Akila Smith	Rice; Longwood	3.52	Ayoka Lee	Kansas State	.621	Mary Crompton	Illinois State	.467	Brynna Maxwell	Utah	.924
Ameshya Williams	Jackson State	3.16	Ariyah Copeland	Alabama	.611	Paige Bueckers	UConn	.464	Macey Turley	Murray State	.923
Jenna Staiti	Georgia	3.04	Mackenzie Holmes	Indiana	.607	Sam Lewis	Fairfield	.461	Kori Pentzer	Weber State	.917

== Postseason ==
=== NCAA tournament ===
==== Tournament upsets ====
For this list, an "upset" is defined as a win by a team seeded 7 or more spots below its defeated opponent.

Date	Winner	Score	Loser	Region	Round
March 22	Belmont (#12)	64–59	Gonzaga (#5)	Mercado	First Round
March 22	Wright State (#13)	66–62	Arkansas (#4)	Alamo	First Round

== Conference standings ==
2020–21 America East Conference women's basketball standings
	Conf.				Overall
Team	W		L	PCT	W		L	PCT
Maine	13	–	2	.867	17	–	3	.850
Stony Brook †	11	–	3	.786	15	–	6	.714
UMass Lowell	10	–	6	.625	12	–	9	.571
Albany	5	–	7	.417	7	–	11	.389
New Hampshire	5	–	11	.313	5	–	15	.250
NJIT	4	–	9	.308	4	–	14	.222
Vermont	4	–	2	.667	4	–	2	.667
UMBC	2	–	4	.333	2	–	6	.250
Hartford	3	–	9	.250	3	–	9	.250
Binghamton	5	–	9	.357	5	–	11	.313
† 2021 America East tournament winner Vermont suspended their season on January 24, 2021; UMBC suspended their season on January 29, 2021; Hartford suspended their season on February 10, 2021; Binghamton suspended their season on February 19, 2021; As of March 12, 2021; Rankings from AP poll

2020–21 American Athletic Conference women's basketball standings
	Conf.				Overall
Team	W		L	PCT	W		L	PCT
No. 19 South Florida †	13	–	2	.867	19	–	4	.826
UCF	12	–	2	.857	16	–	5	.762
Houston	12	–	5	.706	17	–	8	.680
Tulane	12	–	6	.667	18	–	9	.667
Temple	11	–	7	.611	11	–	11	.500
East Carolina	6	–	10	.375	8	–	14	.364
Cincinnati	6	–	12	.333	8	–	16	.333
Tulsa	4	–	13	.235	5	–	14	.263
Wichita State	2	–	9	.182	6	–	12	.333
Memphis	2	–	12	.143	4	–	15	.211
SMU	0	–	2	.000	0	–	6	.000
† 2021 AAC tournament winner SMU suspended their season on December 29, 2020. The American declared a forfeit win for USF against Memphis for conference-standings purposes only as a result of the scheduled game from Jan. 17 that was not played. The teams' overall records were not affected. As of July 7, 2024; Rankings from AP poll

2020–21 Atlantic 10 women's basketball standings
	Conf.				Overall
Team	W		L	PCT	W		L	PCT
Dayton	12	–	1	.923	14	–	5	.737
Fordham	8	–	2	.800	12	–	6	.667
Rhode Island	11	–	4	.733	11	–	8	.579
Saint Louis	9	–	3	.750	14	–	6	.700
VCU †	10	–	5	.667	16	–	11	.593
Richmond	9	–	6	.600	13	–	9	.591
UMass	7	–	5	.583	16	–	8	.667
Duquesne	4	–	7	.364	5	–	11	.313
Saint Joseph's	5	–	9	.357	7	–	10	.412
George Washington	5	–	9	.357	9	–	14	.391
La Salle	6	–	11	.353	11	–	15	.423
St. Bonaventure	6	–	11	.353	8	–	13	.381
Davidson	5	–	10	.333	8	–	15	.348
George Mason	0	–	14	.000	3	–	19	.136
† 2021 A10 Tournament winner As of July 7, 2024; Rankings from AP poll

2020–21 ACC women's basketball standings
	Conf.				Overall
Team	W		L	PCT	W		L	PCT
No. 8 Louisville	14	–	2	.875	26	–	4	.867
No. 3 NC State†	12	–	2	.857	22	–	3	.880
Georgia Tech	12	–	6	.667	17	–	9	.654
Syracuse	9	–	7	.563	15	–	9	.625
Florida State	9	–	7	.563	10	–	9	.526
Notre Dame	8	–	7	.533	10	–	10	.500
Virginia Tech	8	–	8	.500	15	–	10	.600
North Carolina	8	–	9	.471	13	–	11	.542
Miami (FL)	8	–	10	.444	11	–	11	.500
Wake Forest	8	–	10	.444	12	–	13	.480
Clemson	5	–	12	.294	12	–	14	.462
Pittsburgh	3	–	12	.200	5	–	14	.263
Boston College	2	–	11	.154	7	–	12	.368
Duke	0	–	1	.000	3	–	1	.750
Virginia	0	–	2	.000	0	–	5	.000
† 2021 ACC tournament winner Duke suspended their season on December 25, 2020; Virginia suspended their season on January 14, 2021; As of March 30, 2021; Rankings from AP poll

2020–21 ASUN women's basketball standings
	Conf.				Overall
Team	W		L	PCT	W		L	PCT
No. 24 Florida Gulf Coast†	16	–	0	1.000	23	–	2	.920
Liberty	12	–	4	.750	17	–	7	.708
North Florida	11	–	5	.688	13	–	10	.565
Lipscomb	8	–	6	.571	11	–	9	.550
Stetson	7	–	9	.438	9	–	12	.429
North Alabama*	6	–	9	.400	7	–	17	.292
Bellarmine*	5	–	11	.313	5	–	16	.238
Kennesaw State	2	–	11	.154	7	–	11	.389
Jacksonville	1	–	13	.071	3	–	16	.158
† 2021 ASUN Tournament winner * ineligible for the 2021 NCAA tournament due to transition period As of March 6, 2021; Rankings from AP poll

2020–21 Big East Conference women's basketball standings
	Conf.				Overall
Team	W		L	PCT	W		L	PCT
No. 1 UConn†	18	–	0	1.000	28	–	2	.933
Marquette	14	–	4	.778	19	–	7	.731
Seton Hall	12	–	5	.706	14	–	7	.667
DePaul	11	–	5	.688	14	–	10	.583
Villanova	9	–	5	.643	17	–	7	.708
Creighton	6	–	7	.462	10	–	12	.455
Providence	4	–	10	.286	7	–	14	.333
St. John's	4	–	12	.250	8	–	15	.348
Xavier	2	–	8	.200	5	–	10	.333
Butler	3	–	15	.167	3	–	17	.150
Georgetown	2	–	14	.125	2	–	15	.118
† Big East tournament winner As of April 3, 2021; Rankings from AP poll

2020–21 Big Sky women's basketball standings
	Conf.				Overall
Team	W		L	PCT	W		L	PCT
Idaho State †	15	–	2	.882	22	–	4	.846
Idaho	14	–	3	.824	17	–	7	.708
Montana State	13	–	3	.813	17	–	7	.708
Northern Colorado	12	–	7	.632	14	–	11	.560
Northern Arizona	10	–	10	.500	15	–	14	.517
Montana	9	–	8	.529	12	–	11	.522
Portland State	7	–	11	.389	12	–	13	.480
Southern Utah	6	–	5	.545	11	–	9	.550
Eastern Washington	5	–	12	.294	6	–	17	.261
Weber State	2	–	16	.111	2	–	20	.091
Sacramento State	2	–	18	.100	3	–	21	.125
† Big Sky tournament winner As of July 7, 2024; Rankings from AP poll

2020–21 Big South women's basketball standings
	Conf.				Overall
Team	W		L	PCT	W		L	PCT
High Point†	17	–	3	.850	22	–	7	.759
Campbell	11	–	4	.733	16	–	7	.696
Longwood	12	–	6	.667	14	–	11	.560
Gardner–Webb	10	–	7	.588	11	–	13	.458
Presbyterian	10	–	8	.556	11	–	10	.524
Radford	9	–	9	.500	9	–	11	.450
UNC Asheville	9	–	10	.474	10	–	15	.400
Winthrop	5	–	15	.250	6	–	18	.250
USC Upstate	5	–	11	.313	8	–	15	.348
Hampton	4	–	9	.308	4	–	11	.267
Charleston Southern	4	–	14	.222	6	–	17	.261
† 2021 Big South tournament winner Hampton suspended their season on March 2. As of July 7, 2024; Rankings from AP poll

2020–21 Big Ten women's basketball standings
	Conf.				Overall
Team	W		L	PCT	W		L	PCT
No. 7 Maryland †	17	–	1	.944	26	–	2	.929
No. 12 Indiana	16	–	2	.889	20	–	5	.800
No. 21 Rutgers	10	–	3	.769	14	–	5	.737
No. 16 Michigan	9	–	4	.692	16	–	6	.727
Northwestern	11	–	7	.611	16	–	9	.640
Iowa	11	–	8	.579	20	–	9	.690
No. 22 Ohio State	9	–	7	.563	13	–	7	.650
Michigan State	8	–	7	.533	15	–	9	.625
Nebraska	9	–	10	.474	13	–	13	.500
Minnesota	7	–	11	.389	8	–	13	.381
Penn State	6	–	13	.316	9	–	15	.375
Purdue	4	–	14	.222	7	–	16	.304
Illinois	2	–	16	.111	5	–	18	.217
Wisconsin	2	–	18	.100	5	–	19	.208
† 2021 Big Ten tournament winner As of March 27, 2021; Rankings from AP poll

2020–21 Big 12 Conference women's basketball standings
	Conf.				Overall
Team	W		L	PCT	W		L	PCT
No. 5 Baylor†	17	–	1	.944	28	–	2	.933
No. 17 West Virginia	13	–	5	.722	22	–	7	.759
Oklahoma State	13	–	5	.722	19	–	9	.679
Iowa State	12	–	6	.667	17	–	11	.607
Texas	11	–	7	.611	20	–	9	.690
Oklahoma	9	–	9	.500	12	–	12	.500
Texas Tech	5	–	13	.278	10	–	15	.400
TCU	4	–	14	.222	10	–	15	.400
Kansas State	3	–	15	.167	9	–	18	.333
Kansas	3	–	15	.167	7	–	18	.280
† 2021 Big 12 Tournament winner As of March 28, 2021; Rankings from AP poll

2020–21 Big West women's basketball standings
	Conf.				Overall
Team	W		L	PCT	W		L	PCT
UC Davis †	9	–	1	.900	13	–	3	.813
UC Irvine	11	–	4	.733	15	–	9	.625
Long Beach State	11	–	7	.611	12	–	9	.571
Hawaiʻi	7	–	6	.538	9	–	8	.529
Cal State Bakersfield	7	–	6	.538	9	–	9	.500
Cal Poly	8	–	8	.500	13	–	11	.542
UC Santa Barbara	7	–	9	.438	7	–	14	.333
UC San Diego*	6	–	9	.400	6	–	9	.400
UC Riverside	5	–	9	.357	7	–	12	.368
Cal State Fullerton	2	–	14	.125	4	–	18	.182
† 2021 Big West tournament winner * ineligible for the 2021 NCAA tournament due to transition period Rankings from AP poll NOTE: Cal State Northridge will not play in the 2020–21 season due to COVID-19 concerns.

2020–21 CAA women's basketball standings
	Conf.				Overall
Team	W		L	PCT	W		L	PCT
Delaware	16	–	2	.889	24	–	5	.828
James Madison	9	–	6	.600	14	–	10	.583
Drexel†	8	–	6	.571	14	–	9	.609
Towson	8	–	6	.571	13	–	9	.591
Hofstra	5	–	7	.417	8	–	12	.400
Elon	3	–	5	.375	7	–	8	.467
Northeastern	6	–	10	.375	7	–	13	.350
William & Mary	3	–	5	.375	6	–	7	.462
Charleston	2	–	6	.250	6	–	9	.400
UNC Wilmington	3	–	10	.231	7	–	14	.333
† 2021 CAA tournament winner Rankings from AP poll

2020–21 Conference USA women's basketball standings
	Conf.				Overall
Team	W		L	PCT	W		L	PCT
East
Middle Tennessee †	12	–	4	.750	17	–	8	.680
Charlotte	9	–	5	.643	10	–	12	.455
FIU	8	–	8	.500	15	–	13	.536
Florida Atlantic	8	–	8	.500	11	–	11	.500
Old Dominion	7	–	9	.438	13	–	11	.542
Marshall	7	–	9	.438	8	–	11	.421
Western Kentucky	6	–	10	.375	7	–	16	.304
West
Rice	12	–	2	.857	23	–	4	.852
UTEP	13	–	5	.722	17	–	8	.680
North Texas	10	–	4	.714	13	–	7	.650
Louisiana Tech	8	–	8	.500	14	–	10	.583
Southern Miss	5	–	11	.313	7	–	12	.368
UAB	3	–	11	.214	10	–	13	.435
UTSA	0	–	14	.000	2	–	18	.100
† 2021 C-USA tournament winner As of March 13, 2021; Rankings from AP poll

2020–21 Horizon League women's basketball standings
	Conf.				Overall
Team	W		L	PCT	W		L	PCT
Wright State†	15	–	5	.750	19	–	8	.704
Milwaukee	15	–	5	.750	20	–	8	.714
Green Bay	14	–	4	.778	15	–	7	.682
Oakland	12	–	8	.600	12	–	12	.500
IUPUI	11	–	3	.786	15	–	5	.750
Cleveland State	9	–	7	.563	15	–	8	.652
Youngstown State	8	–	8	.500	9	–	9	.500
Northern Kentucky	7	–	5	.583	8	–	11	.421
Robert Morris	4	–	12	.250	4	–	13	.235
Purdue Fort Wayne	1	–	19	.050	1	–	22	.043
UIC	1	–	13	.071	3	–	16	.158
Detroit Mercy	1	–	9	.100	1	–	13	.071
† 2021 Horizon League Tournament winner Detroit Mercy suspended their season on January 21, 2021; As of July 7, 2024; Rankings from AP poll

2020–21 MAAC women's basketball standings
	Conf.				Overall
Team	W		L	PCT	W		L	PCT
Marist †	13	–	3	.813	18	–	4	.818
Quinnipiac	11	–	5	.688	13	–	8	.619
Saint Peter's	10	–	9	.526	13	–	15	.464
Fairfield	9	–	3	.750	11	–	5	.688
Manhattan	9	–	3	.750	11	–	9	.550
Iona	5	–	6	.455	6	–	9	.400
Rider	5	–	13	.278	8	–	18	.308
Niagara	4	–	6	.400	4	–	7	.364
Siena	3	–	8	.273	4	–	9	.308
Monmouth	2	–	11	.154	2	–	16	.111
Canisius	0	–	4	.000	0	–	5	.000
† 2021 MAAC tournament winner Notes: The MAAC has ordered standings based on league wins, not winning percentage, since all teams will not reach 20 conference games played. These standings are also used for seeding purposes in the 2021 MAAC Tournament. Canisius suspended their season on February 4, 2021; As of July 7, 2024; Rankings from AP poll

2020–21 Mid-American Conference women's basketball standings
	Conf.				Overall
Team	W		L	PCT	W		L	PCT
Bowling Green	14	–	4	.778	20	–	5	.800
Central Michigan†	13	–	6	.684	17	–	8	.680
Ohio	11	–	6	.647	14	–	8	.636
Buffalo	11	–	6	.647	15	–	9	.625
Kent State	10	–	6	.625	11	–	9	.550
Ball State	12	–	8	.600	14	–	11	.560
Northern Illinois	10	–	8	.556	12	–	12	.500
Eastern Michigan	7	–	7	.500	10	–	10	.500
Toledo	8	–	12	.400	12	–	12	.500
Western Michigan	5	–	14	.263	6	–	15	.286
Akron	4	–	14	.222	7	–	14	.333
Miami (OH)	3	–	17	.150	4	–	20	.167
† 2021 MAC tournament winner As of July 7, 2024; Rankings from AP poll

2020–21 MEAC women's basketball standings
	Conf.				Overall
Team	W		L	PCT	W		L	PCT
North
Howard	10	–	2	.833	15	–	4	.789
Morgan State	8	–	2	.800	12	–	4	.750
Delaware State	2	–	8	.200	3	–	12	.200
Coppin State	2	–	10	.167	2	–	13	.133
South
North Carolina A&T†	9	–	1	.900	14	–	3	.824
Norfolk State	3	–	5	.375	5	–	9	.357
North Carolina Central	2	–	6	.250	4	–	12	.250
South Carolina State	0	–	2	.000	1	–	9	.100
† 2021 MEAC tournament winner South Carolina State suspended their season on February 3, 2021; Delaware State suspended their season on March 3, 2021; As of February 16, 2021; Rankings from AP poll NOTE: Bethune–Cookman, Florida A&M, and Maryland Eastern Shore will not play in the 2020–21 season due to COVID-19 concerns.

2020–21 Missouri Valley Conference women's basketball standings
	Conf.				Overall
Team	W		L	PCT	W		L	PCT
No. 20 Missouri State	16	–	0	1.000	23	–	4	.852
Drake	13	–	5	.722	18	–	12	.600
Illinois State	12	–	6	.667	16	–	9	.640
Northern Iowa	11	–	7	.611	17	–	13	.567
Bradley†	10	–	8	.556	17	–	12	.586
Loyola–Chicago	8	–	10	.444	12	–	15	.444
Valparaiso	7	–	9	.438	12	–	13	.480
Southern Illinois	5	–	13	.278	9	–	16	.360
Indiana State	2	–	12	.143	5	–	15	.250
Evansville	2	–	16	.111	6	–	18	.250
† 2021 MVC tournament winner As of July 7, 2024; Rankings from AP poll

2020–21 Mountain West Conference women's basketball standings
	Conf.				Overall
Team	W		L	PCT	W		L	PCT
New Mexico	11	–	3	.786	15	–	5	.750
UNLV	13	–	5	.722	15	–	9	.625
Colorado State	11	–	5	.688	15	–	6	.714
Fresno State	12	–	6	.667	17	–	11	.607
Nevada	9	–	7	.563	13	–	9	.591
Boise State	10	–	8	.556	14	–	9	.609
Wyoming†	8	–	8	.500	14	–	10	.583
San Jose State	1	–	2	.333	2	–	3	.400
San Diego State	5	–	12	.294	7	–	17	.292
Air Force	4	–	14	.222	8	–	18	.308
Utah State	2	–	16	.111	4	–	20	.167
† 2021 MW Tournament winner San Jose State suspended their season on January 14, 2021; As of July 7, 2024; Rankings from AP poll

2020–21 Northeast Conference women's basketball standings
	Conf.				Overall
Team	W		L	PCT	W		L	PCT
Mount St. Mary's†	14	–	4	.778	17	–	7	.708
Wagner	12	–	4	.750	13	–	6	.684
Saint Francis (PA)	12	–	4	.750	14	–	9	.609
Fairleigh Dickinson	12	–	6	.667	16	–	8	.667
Sacred Heart	8	–	8	.500	8	–	10	.444
LIU	7	–	11	.389	7	–	11	.389
Merrimack*	5	–	10	.333	5	–	10	.333
Bryant	5	–	12	.294	7	–	14	.333
St. Francis Brooklyn	4	–	10	.286	4	–	10	.286
Central Connecticut	4	–	14	.222	4	–	14	.222
† 2021 NEC tournament winner * ineligible for the 2021 NCAA tournament due to transition period St. Francis Brooklyn suspended their season on February 23, 2021; As of July 7, 2024; Rankings from AP poll

2020–21 Ohio Valley Conference women's basketball standings
	Conf.				Overall
Team	W		L	PCT	W		L	PCT
UT Martin	17	–	2	.895	22	–	6	.786
Belmont †	14	–	3	.824	21	–	6	.778
Southeast Missouri State	13	–	7	.650	15	–	11	.577
Jacksonville State	12	–	7	.632	15	–	9	.625
Tennessee Tech	12	–	8	.600	15	–	10	.600
Murray State	12	–	8	.600	16	–	11	.593
Austin Peay	10	–	8	.556	12	–	11	.522
Eastern Illinois	9	–	11	.450	11	–	15	.423
Eastern Kentucky	8	–	12	.400	9	–	15	.375
Morehead State	6	–	13	.316	7	–	16	.304
SIU Edwardsville	3	–	17	.150	6	–	19	.240
Tennessee State	0	–	20	.000	0	–	22	.000
† 2021 OVC tournament winner As of July 7, 2024; Rankings from AP poll

2020–21 Pac-12 Conference women's basketball standings
	Conf.				Overall
Team	W		L	PCT	W		L	PCT
No. 2 Stanford†	19	–	2	.905	31	–	2	.939
No. 11 Arizona	13	–	4	.765	21	–	6	.778
No. 9 UCLA	12	–	4	.750	17	–	6	.739
No. 23 Oregon	10	–	7	.588	15	–	9	.625
Oregon State	7	–	6	.538	12	–	8	.600
Colorado	8	–	8	.500	12	–	11	.522
Washington State	9	–	10	.474	12	–	12	.500
USC	8	–	10	.444	11	–	12	.478
Arizona State	6	–	9	.400	11	–	12	.478
Utah	4	–	15	.211	5	–	16	.238
Washington	3	–	13	.188	7	–	14	.333
California	1	–	12	.077	1	–	16	.059
† 2021 Pac-12 Tournament winner As of March 29, 2021; Rankings from AP poll

2020–21 Patriot League women's basketball standings
	Conf.				Overall
Team	W		L	PCT	W		L	PCT
North
Boston University	11	–	2	.846	12	–	3	.800
Holy Cross	7	–	7	.500	7	–	8	.467
Army	6	–	8	.429	9	–	11	.450
Colgate	1	–	8	.111	1	–	8	.111
Central
Bucknell	8	–	1	.889	9	–	1	.900
Lehigh†	8	–	5	.615	10	–	6	.625
Lafayette	5	–	7	.417	5	–	8	.385
South
American	7	–	4	.636	8	–	4	.667
Navy	5	–	4	.556	5	–	8	.385
Loyola (MD)	0	–	12	.000	0	–	13	.000
† 2021 Patriot League tournament winner Colgate suspended their season on February 18, 2021; As of July 7, 2024; Rankings from AP poll

2020–21 SEC women's basketball standings
	Conf.				Overall
Team	W		L	PCT	W		L	PCT
No. 4 Texas A&M	13	–	1	.929	25	–	3	.893
No. 6 South Carolina †	14	–	2	.875	26	–	5	.839
No. 13 Tennessee	9	–	4	.692	17	–	8	.680
No. 10 Georgia	10	–	5	.667	20	–	6	.769
No. 15 Arkansas	9	–	6	.600	19	–	8	.704
No. 18 Kentucky	9	–	6	.600	18	–	8	.692
Alabama	8	–	8	.500	16	–	9	.640
LSU	6	–	8	.429	9	–	13	.409
Mississippi State	5	–	7	.417	10	–	9	.526
Missouri	5	–	9	.357	9	–	13	.409
Ole Miss	4	–	10	.286	15	–	12	.556
Florida	3	–	11	.214	12	–	14	.462
Auburn	0	–	15	.000	5	–	19	.208
Vanderbilt^{%}	0	–	3	.000	4	–	4	.500
† 2021 SEC tournament winner % Vanderbilt suspended their season on January 18, 2021; As of March 21, 2021; Rankings from AP poll

2020–21 Southern Conference women's basketball standings
	Conf.				Overall
Team	W		L	PCT	W		L	PCT
Samford	11	–	2	.846	14	–	11	.560
Mercer†	10	–	3	.769	19	–	7	.731
Chattanooga	9	–	5	.643	14	–	10	.583
Wofford	7	–	7	.500	13	–	11	.542
Furman	6	–	8	.429	11	–	14	.440
UNC Greensboro	6	–	8	.429	8	–	16	.333
Western Carolina	3	–	10	.231	6	–	18	.250
East Tennessee State	1	–	10	.091	4	–	16	.200
† 2021 SoCon Tournament winner As of July 7, 2021; Rankings from AP poll

2020–21 Southland Conference women's basketball standings
	Conf.				Overall
Team	W		L	PCT	W		L	PCT
Stephen F. Austin †	14	–	0	1.000	24	–	3	.889
Southeastern Louisiana	10	–	5	.667	11	–	8	.579
Sam Houston State	9	–	5	.643	15	–	8	.652
Lamar	9	–	6	.600	10	–	14	.417
Central Arkansas	9	–	7	.563	13	–	14	.481
Nicholls	9	–	7	.563	11	–	14	.440
Abilene Christian	6	–	7	.462	14	–	10	.583
Houston Baptist	6	–	7	.462	11	–	11	.500
Incarnate Word	4	–	5	.444	6	–	8	.429
McNeese State	6	–	8	.429	6	–	16	.273
Texas A&M–CC	4	–	7	.364	6	–	13	.316
New Orleans	3	–	12	.200	6	–	15	.286
Northwestern State	1	–	14	.067	1	–	19	.050
† SLC tournament winner As of April 4, 2021; Rankings from AP poll

2020–21 SWAC women's basketball standings
	Conf.				Overall
Team	W		L	PCT	W		L	PCT
Jackson State†	14	–	1	.933	18	–	6	.750
Alabama State	14	–	3	.824	16	–	4	.800
Southern	11	–	4	.733	12	–	11	.522
Alabama A&M	8	–	5	.615	10	–	7	.588
Grambling State	8	–	6	.571	10	–	10	.500
Alcorn State	7	–	8	.467	7	–	13	.350
Texas Southern	4	–	8	.333	5	–	10	.333
Prairie View A&M	2	–	11	.154	3	–	13	.188
Mississippi Valley State	2	–	13	.133	4	–	16	.200
Arkansas-Pine Bluff	2	–	13	.133	3	–	18	.143
† 2021 SWAC tournament winner As of July 7, 2024; Rankings from AP poll

2020–21 Summit League women's basketball standings
	Conf.				Overall
Team	W		L	PCT	W		L	PCT
No. 25 South Dakota State	14	–	0	1.000	21	–	4	.840
South Dakota†	12	–	2	.857	19	–	6	.760
North Dakota State	9	–	7	.563	15	–	9	.625
Kansas City	7	–	8	.467	10	–	12	.455
Western Illinois	6	–	8	.429	8	–	16	.333
Denver	5	–	9	.357	7	–	16	.304
Omaha	4	–	8	.333	7	–	13	.350
Oral Roberts	4	–	8	.333	6	–	15	.286
North Dakota	2	–	13	.133	2	–	19	.095
† 2021 Summit League tournament winner As of December 2, 2021; Rankings from AP poll

2020–21 Sun Belt Conference women's basketball standings
	Conf.				Overall
Team	W		L	PCT	W		L	PCT
East
Troy †	15	–	2	.882	22	–	6	.786
Georgia State	9	–	7	.563	13	–	11	.542
Appalachian State	10	–	8	.556	15	–	12	.556
South Alabama	9	–	9	.500	13	–	13	.500
Georgia Southern	5	–	9	.357	11	–	13	.458
Coastal Carolina	0	–	13	.000	3	–	15	.167
West
Louisiana	13	–	1	.929	16	–	7	.696
UT Arlington	11	–	4	.733	13	–	7	.650
Little Rock	9	–	7	.563	15	–	11	.577
Texas State	7	–	8	.467	11	–	11	.500
Arkansas State	4	–	10	.286	9	–	12	.429
Louisiana–Monroe	1	–	15	.063	2	–	20	.091
† 2021 Sun Belt tournament winner

2020–21 WAC women's basketball standings
	Conf.				Overall
Team	W		L	PCT	W		L	PCT
California Baptist*†	14	–	0	1.000	26	–	1	.963
Utah Valley^	10	–	4	.714	13	–	6	.684
Grand Canyon	8	–	4	.667	18	–	7	.720
New Mexico State	6	–	6	.500	9	–	12	.429
Seattle	6	–	8	.429	11	–	14	.440
Tarleton State*	4	–	10	.286	9	–	16	.360
UTRGV	2	–	8	.200	6	–	14	.300
Chicago State	0	–	10	.000	0	–	14	.000
Dixie State*	0	–	0	–	1	–	2	.333
† 2021 WAC tournament winner * ineligible for the 2021 NCAA tournament due to transition period. Dixie State suspended its season on January 6, 2021.^ received automatic bid for the 2021 NCAA tournament as conference tournament runner-up, due to California Baptist's ineligibility Rankings from AP poll

2020–21 West Coast Conference women's basketball standings
	Conf.				Overall
Team	W		L	PCT	W		L	PCT
No. 14 Gonzaga†	16	–	1	.941	23	–	4	.852
BYU	13	–	3	.813	19	–	5	.792
San Diego	9	–	5	.643	12	–	7	.632
San Francisco	10	–	7	.588	16	–	11	.593
Santa Clara	9	–	8	.529	14	–	11	.560
Portland	9	–	8	.529	14	–	13	.519
Pacific	9	–	9	.500	11	–	11	.500
Saint Mary's	4	–	14	.222	7	–	19	.269
Loyola Marymount	4	–	14	.222	7	–	19	.269
Pepperdine	2	–	16	.111	5	–	18	.217
† 2021 WCC tournament winner San Diego suspended their season on February 25, 2021; Rankings from AP poll

== Award winners ==
=== All-America teams ===
The NCAA has never recognized a consensus All-America team in women's basketball. This differs from the practice in men's basketball, in which the NCAA uses a combination of selections by the Associated Press (AP), the National Association of Basketball Coaches (NABC), the Sporting News, and the United States Basketball Writers Association (USBWA) to determine a consensus All-America team. The selection of a consensus team is possible because all four organizations select at least a first and second team, with only the USBWA not selecting a third team.

Before the 2017–18 season, it was impossible for a consensus women's All-America team to be determined because the AP had been the only body that divided its women's selections into separate teams. The USBWA first named separate teams in 2017–18. The women's counterpart to the NABC, the Women's Basketball Coaches Association (WBCA), continues the USBWA's former practice of selecting a single 10-member (plus ties) team. The NCAA does not recognize Sporting News as an All-America selector in women's basketball.

=== Major player of the year awards ===
- Wooden Award: Paige Bueckers, UConn
- Naismith Award: Paige Bueckers, UConn
- Associated Press Player of the Year: Paige Bueckers, UConn
- Wade Trophy: NaLyssa Smith, Baylor
- Ann Meyers Drysdale Women's Player of the Year (USBWA): Paige Bueckers, UConn
- ESPN.com National Player of the Year: Paige Bueckers, UConn

=== Major freshman of the year awards ===
- Tamika Catchings Award (USBWA): Paige Bueckers, UConn and Caitlin Clark, Iowa
- WBCA Freshman of the Year: Paige Bueckers, UConn and Caitlin Clark, Iowa
- ESPN.com Freshman of the Year: Paige Bueckers, UConn

=== Major coach of the year awards ===
- Associated Press Coach of the Year: Brenda Frese, Maryland
- Naismith College Coach of the Year: Tara VanDerveer, Stanford
- USBWA National Coach of the Year: Tara VanDerveer, Stanford
- WBCA National Coach of the Year: Wes Moore, NC State
- ESPN.com Coach of the Year: Brenda Frese, Maryland
- WBCA Assistant Coach of the Year: Stephanie Norman, Louisville

=== Other major awards ===
- Naismith Starting Five:
  - Nancy Lieberman Award (top point guard): Paige Bueckers, UConn
  - Ann Meyers Drysdale Award (top shooting guard): Ashley Owusu, Maryland
  - Cheryl Miller Award (top small forward): Ashley Joens, Iowa State
  - Katrina McClain Award (top power forward): NaLyssa Smith, Baylor
  - Lisa Leslie Award (top center): Aliyah Boston, South Carolina
- WBCA Defensive Player of the Year: Natasha Mack, Oklahoma State
- Naismith Women's Defensive Player of the Year: Natasha Mack, Oklahoma State
- Becky Hammon Mid-Major Player of the Year Award: Kierstan Bell, Florida Gulf Coast
- Senior CLASS Award (top senior on and off the court): Rennia Davis, Tennessee
- Maggie Dixon Award (top rookie head coach): Kyra Elzy, Kentucky
- Academic All-American of the Year (top scholar-athlete): Aliyah Boston, South Carolina
- Elite 90 Award (top GPA among upperclass players at Final Four): Sam Thomas, Arizona
- Pat Summitt Most Courageous Award: Not presented in 2021, although the men's version of this award was presented.

== Coaching changes ==
Team	Former coach	Interim coach	New coach	Reason
Army	Dave Magarity		Missy Traversi	Magarity announced his retirement on January 28, 2021, after 15 seasons at Army, effective at the end of the season. On March 29, Missy Traversi was hired by the Black Knights following five seasons as head coach at D-II Adelphi.
Auburn	Terri Williams-Flournoy		Johnnie Harris	Auburn announced a coaching change on March 4, 2021, firing Williams-Flournoy after 9 seasons. Texas associate head coach Johnnie Harris was hired as the Tigers' new head coach on April 3.
Austin Peay	David Midlick		Brittany Young	Midlick's contract was not renewed on March 8, 2021, ending his 6-year tenure at Austin Peay with an 85–88 record. The Governors hired Mississippi State assistant Brittany Young as their new head coach on March 17.
Baylor	Kim Mulkey		Nicki Collen	Mulkey left Baylor on April 25, 2021, after 21 seasons and 3 national championships for the LSU head coaching job. Atlanta Dream head coach Nicki Collen was hired by the Lady Bears on May 3.
Bethune–Cookman	Vanessa Blair-Lewis		Janell Crayton	Blair-Lewis left Bethune–Cookman on April 6, 2021, after 13 seasons for the George Mason head coaching job. On July 2, the Wildcats named Kennesaw State assistant Crayton as their new head coach.
Boston University	Marisa Moseley		Melissa D'Amico	Moseley left her alma mater on March 26, 2021, after 3 seasons to accept the head coaching job at Wisconsin. Wake Forest assistant D'Amico was hired by the Terriers on April 23.
Canisius	Scott Hemer		Sahar Nusseibeh	Hemer, citing personal and health reasons, resigned from Canisius on June 22, 2021, after 3 seasons. Miami (OH) assistant Nusseibeh was hired by the Golden Griffins on July 23.
Charleston Southern	Fred Applin		Clarisse Garcia	On April 9, 2021, Charleston Southern announced they would not extend Applin's contract following 9 seasons and a 67–178 record with the Buccaneers. Auburn assistant coach Clarisse Garcia was hired on May 3.
Colgate	Bill Cleary		Ganiyat Adeduntan	On April 8, 2021, Cleary announced his resignation after 5 seasons and a 49–79 record with the Raiders. George Washington assistant coach Ganiyat Adeduntan was hired by the Raiders on April 21.
Dartmouth	Belle Koclanes		Adrienne Shibles	Koclanes announced on February 24, 2021, that she will leave Dartmouth after 7 seasons to become president of a non-profit organization in Delaware effective March 31. Adrienne Shibles was hired by the Big Green on May 3 after 13 seasons as head coach at D-III Bowdoin.
Delaware State	David Caputo		E.C. Hill	Delaware State parted ways with Caputo on April 1, 2021, after 3 seasons and a 22–51 overall record. Towson assistant coach Hill was hired by the Hornets on June 4.
Drake	Jennie Baranczyk		Allison Pohlman	On April 10, 2021, Baranczyk left Drake after 9 seasons to accept the head coaching position at Oklahoma. The Bulldogs filled the vacancy by promoting associate head coach Pohlman on April 19.
East Tennessee State	Brittney Ezell		Simon Harris	ETSU fired Ezell on March 8, 2021, after 8 seasons and a 105–132 overall record. The Buccaneers announced Ohio State assistant Simon Harris as their new head coach on March 19.
Eastern Kentucky	Samantha Williams		Greg Todd	Williams resigned from EKU on April 16, 2021, after 2 seasons and a 20–33 record to become an assistant at Tennessee. Morehead State head coach and EKU alum Greg Todd was hired by the Colonels on May 10.
Eastern Washington	Wendy Schuller		Joddie Gleason	On March 31, 2021, EWU announced that Schuller would not return as head coach after 20 seasons with the Eagles. Seattle associate head coach Joddie Gleason was hired on May 21.
Evansville	Matt Ruffing		Robyn Scherr-Wells	Evansville parted ways with Ruffing on March 15, 2021, after 5 seasons and a 31–119 overall record. On April 20, FIU assistant Robyn Scherr-Wells was hired by the Purple Aces.
Florida Atlantic	Jim Jabir		Jennifer Sullivan	Jabir left FAU on April 7, 2021, after 4 seasons to return to Siena, where he had been head coach there from 1987 to 1990, for a second stint as head coach. Tennessee assistant coach Jennifer Sullivan was named the Owls' new head coach on April 15.
Florida State	Sue Semrau	Brooke Wyckoff	Sue Semrau	Semrau announced on September 8, 2020, that she will take a leave of absence from Florida State for the 2020–21 season to care for her mother, with the expectation of returning to the team at the end of the season. Associate head coach Wyckoff served as the Seminoles' interim head coach during Semrau's absence. Semrau officially returned to Florida State on April 1, 2021.
George Mason	Nyla Milleson		Vanessa Blair-Lewis	Milleson announced her resignation on March 11, 2021, after 8 seasons and a 98–140 overall record at GMU. Bethune–Cookman head coach Vanessa Blair-Lewis was hired by the Patriots on April 6.
George Washington	Jennifer Rizzotti		Caroline McCombs	GW parted ways with Rizzotti on March 15, 2021, after 5 seasons and a 72–74 overall record. On April 2, the Colonials hired Stony Brook head coach McCombs for the same position.
Hartford	Morgan Valley	Melissa Hodgdon	Polly Thomason	Valley left Hartford on April 21, 2021, after 2 seasons to return to her alma mater UConn as an assistant coach. Assistant coach Hodgdon was named interim head coach of the Hawks for the 2021–22 season. On May 27, 2022, the school hired Polly Thomason from D3 UT Dallas as the permanent replacement.
Indiana State	Vicki Hall		Chad Killinger	A week after parting ways with the men's basketball head coach, Indiana State and Hall agreed to part ways on March 15, 2021, after 3 seasons and a 21–59 overall record. Nicholls assistant coach Chad Killinger was hired by the Sycamores on April 20.
Kennesaw State	Agnus Berenato		Octavia Blue	Berenato retired on March 29, 2021, following a 33-year head coaching career, the last 5 years spent at Kennesaw State. Miami (FL) associate head coach Blue was hired by the Owls on April 29.
Kentucky	Matthew Mitchell	Kyra Elzy		Mitchell announced his retirement on November 12, 2020, after 15 seasons as a head coach, the last 13 at Kentucky. Following his announcement, associate head coach Kyra Elzy was initially named the interim head coach of the Wildcats for the 2020–21 season, but UK athletic director Mitch Barnhart removed the interim tag from Elzy on December 14.
Loyola (MD)	Joe Logan		Danielle O'Banion	On March 30, 2021, Loyola announced that Logan would not return as head coach following 16 seasons with the Greyhounds. He was replaced by Minnesota assistant and former Kent State head coach Danielle O'Banion on April 23.
Loyola Marymount	Charity Elliott		Aarika Hughes	On April 5, 2021, Elliott announced she would be stepping down following 9 seasons as head coach of LMU. The Lions stayed in the LA area for their next hire, naming USC assistant coach Aarika Hughes for the job on April 19.
LSU	Nikki Fargas		Kim Mulkey	Fargas stepped down on April 15, 2021, after 10 seasons and a 177–129 record at LSU to become president of the Las Vegas Aces. Baylor head coach and Hall of Famer Kim Mulkey was hired by the Lady Tigers on April 25.
McNeese State	Kacie Cryer		Lynn Kennedy	On March 12, 2021, McNeese State announced they would not be extending Cryer's contract, ending her 5-year tenure at the school. Portland State head coach Lynn Kennedy was hired by the Cowgirls on March 30.
Memphis	Melissa McFerrin	Michele Savage	Katrina Merriweather	McFerrin announced her retirement effective immediately on February 14, 2021, after 13 seasons at Memphis. Assistant coach Savage was named interim head coach of the Tigers for the rest of the season. Wright State head coach Katrina Merriweather was hired as the school's new coach on March 29.
Monmouth	Jody Craig		Ginny Boggess	Craig announced her resignation from Monmouth on March 11, 2021, after 4 seasons and a 33–69 overall record. She had been suspended by the school approximately 48 hours before her resignation. Penn State assistant coach and head recruiting coordinator Boggess was hired as the Hawks' new head coach on April 8.
Morehead State	Greg Todd		Cayla Petree	Todd left Morehead State on May 10, 2021, after 7 seasons for the head coaching job at his alma mater Eastern Kentucky. On June 4, the Eagles hired Cayla Petree from Gulf Coast State College of the NJCAA as their new head coach.
Mount St. Mary's	Maria Marchesano		Antoine White	Marchesano left the Mount on March 30, 2021, after 4 seasons for the head coaching job at Purdue Fort Wayne. Associate head coach Antoine White was promoted to head coach of the Mountaineers immediately following Marchesano's departure.
Northeastern	Kelly Cole		Bridgette Mitchell	Northeastern parted ways with Cole on March 24, 2021, after 7 seasons and an 87–116 overall record. Pittsburgh assistant Mitchell was hired by the Huskies on April 17.
Northern Colorado	Jennifer Roulier-Huth		Kristen Mattio	Huth announced her resignation from Northern Colorado on April 21, 2021, after 3 seasons and a 48–41 record. The Bears hired Mattio, head coach at D-II West Texas A&M for the past 6 seasons, on May 8.
Oklahoma	Sherri Coale		Jennie Baranczyk	Coale announced her retirement after 25 seasons at Oklahoma on March 17, 2021. The 2016 Women's Basketball Hall of Fame inductee left the program with a 512–293 overall record, three Final Four appearances, and six Big 12 regular-season titles. The Sooners hired Drake head coach Jennie Baranczyk as her successor on April 10.
Portland State	Lynn Kennedy		Chelsey Gregg	Kennedy left Portland State on March 30, 2021, after 6 seasons for the McNeese State head coaching job. Associate head coach Gregg was promoted to head coach of the Vikings on April 16.
Purdue Fort Wayne	Niecee Nelson		Maria Marchesano	Purdue Fort Wayne announced on February 26, 2021, that Nelson, who had been under investigation for toxic abuse in the program, would not have her contract renewed at the end of the season, ending her 5-year tenure at the school. On March 30, the Mastodons hired Fort Wayne native Maria Marchesano from Mount St. Mary's as their new head coach.
Rice	Tina Langley		Lindsay Edmonds	Langley left Rice on April 5, 2021, after 6 seasons for the Washington head coaching job. The Owls hired NC State assistant Edmonds as her replacement on April 23.
Sacramento State	Bunky Harkleroad		Mark Campbell	Sacramento State parted ways with Harkleroad on March 18, 2021, after 8 seasons and an 88–151 overall record. Oregon assistant coach Campbell was named the new head coach of the Hornets on April 16.
Siena	Ali Jaques		Jim Jabir	Siena opted not to renew Jaques' contract on March 15, 2021, ending her 9-year tenure at the school with a 116–148 record. Florida Atlantic head coach Jim Jabir, who previously served as head coach of the Saints from 1987 to 1990, returned on April 7.
SIU Edwardsville	Paula Buscher		Samantha Quigley Smith	SIUE fired Buscher on March 19, 2021, after 9 seasons and a 117–152 record. The Cougars hired Samantha Quigley Smith from D-II Lewis University on April 27.
SMU	Travis Mays		Toyelle Wilson	SMU declined to renew Mays' contract on March 8, 2021, ending his 5-year tenure as head coach with a 63–75 overall record. The Mustangs hired Michigan assistant and former Prairie View A&M head coach Toyelle Wilson on April 1.
Stony Brook	Caroline McCombs		Ashley Langford	McCombs left Stony Brook on April 2, 2021, after 7 seasons for the head coaching job at George Washington. James Madison associate head coach Ashley Langford was hired by the Seawolves on April 28.
Tulsa	Matilda Mossman		Angie Nelp	On March 18, 2021, Mossman announced her retirement from coaching, finishing her ten-year tenure at Tulsa with a 119–176 and a career record of 266–269 in 19 seasons. Arizona State associate head coach Angie Nelp was hired by the Golden Hurricane on April 12.
UMass Lowell	Tom Garrick		Denise King	Garrick announced on April 13, 2021, that he would be stepping down as head coach at UMass Lowell after 3 seasons to become an assistant for his wife Shea Ralph, who was hired as the new head coach at Vanderbilt. River Hawks assistant King was promoted to the head coaching position on May 20.
USC	Mark Trakh		Lindsay Gottlieb	On April 21, 2021, Trakh announced his retirement from coaching after 4 seasons of his 2nd stint at USC, finishing his 26-year tenure as a head coach with a career record of 458–317. Cleveland Cavaliers assistant Lindsay Gottlieb was hired by the Trojans on May 10.
UTSA	Kristen Holt		Karen Aston	Holt's contract with UTSA was not renewed on March 16, 2021, ending her 4-year tenure with a 24–83 overall record. Former Texas head coach Karen Aston was hired as the Roadrunners' new head coach on March 29.
Vanderbilt	Stephanie White		Shea Ralph	On April 6, 2021, Vanderbilt parted ways with White following 5 seasons and a 46–83 record with the Commodores. The Commodores hired longtime UConn assistant Ralph on April 13.
Wagner	Heather Jacobs		Terrell Coburn	Jacobs resigned on April 26, 2021, after 5 seasons at Wagner. Assistant coach Coburn was promoted by the Seahawks to the head coaching position 2 days later.
Washington	Jody Wynn		Tina Langley	Washington fired Wynn on March 15, 2021, after 4 seasons and a 38–75 record, the lowest winning percentage by a head coach in the program. Rice head coach Tina Langley was hired by the Huskies on April 5.
Wisconsin	Jonathan Tsipis		Marisa Moseley	Wisconsin fired Tsipis on March 9, 2021, after 5 seasons, in which the Badgers went 50–99 overall and never finished higher than 11th place in conference play. On March 26, the school hired Boston University's Marisa Moseley as their next head coach.
Wright State	Katrina Merriweather		Kari Hoffman	Merriweather left Wright State on March 29, 2021, after 5 seasons for the Memphis head coaching job. The Raiders hired Kari Hoffman on May 20 after 5 seasons as head coach at D-II Cedarville.

== See also ==
- 2020–21 NCAA Division I men's basketball season
