= Maria Marchesano =

American basketball coach and former player

Current position
- Title: Head coach
- Team: Butler
- Conference: Big East
- Record: 0–0

Biographical details
- Born: Fort Wayne, Indiana, U.S.

Playing career
- 2001–2005: Butler

Coaching career (HC unless noted)
- 2010–2012: Manchester (assistant)
- 2011–2013: Urbana
- 2013–2016: Walsh
- 2016–2017: IUPUI (AHC)
- 2017–2021: Mount St. Mary's
- 2021–2026: Purdue Fort Wayne
- 2026–present: Butler

Head coaching record
- Overall: 153–130 (.541)
- Tournaments: 0–1 (NCAA Division I)

Accomplishments and honors

Championships
- Northeast Conference Regular Season (2021); Northeast Conference Tournament (2021)

Awards
- Northeast Conference Coach of the Year (2021); Horizon League Coach of the Year (2025)

Maria Marchesano is an American college basketball coach who is currently the head coach of the Butler Bulldogs women's basketball program. She previously held the same position at Purdue University Fort Wayne and Mount St. Mary's University.

== Playing career ==
Marchesano played four seasons of college basketball for Butler University, as well as one season of college softball. She graduated in 2005.

== Coaching career ==
=== Division II (2010–2016) ===
Marchesano began her head coaching career with stints at NCAA Division II schools Urbana University and Walsh University.

=== Mount St. Mary's (2017–2021) ===
In 2017 Marchesano was hired as the head coach at Mount St. Mary's University. The Mountaineers saw substantial improvement during her tenure, and in 2021 she led the program to its first Northeast Conference regular season title since 2001.

=== Purdue Fort Wayne (2021–2026) ===
Marchesano returned to her hometown and became the head coach of the Purdue Fort Wayne Mastodons in 2022. She remained at Purdue Fort Wayne for five seasons, and was recognized as the Horizon League Coach of the Year in 2025.

=== Butler (2026–present) ===
In 2026 Marchesano became the head coach at her alma mater, Butler University, replacing Austin Parkinson.

== Personal life ==
Marchesano's father immigrated to the United States from Italy. As a result, she has dual-citizenship and played professional basketball in Sardinia.

== Head coaching record ==
Record table
Season	Team	Overall	Conference	Standing	Postseason
Mount St. Mary's Mountaineers (Northeast Conference) (2017–2021)
2017–18	Mount St. Mary's	9–20	6–12	9th	
2018–19	Mount St. Mary's	15–16	8–10	T-6th	
2019–20	Mount St. Mary's	20–11	14–4	2nd	
2020–21	Mount St. Mary's	17–7	14–4	1st	NCAA Division I Round of 64
Mount St. Mary's:		61–54 (.530)	42–30 (.583)		
Purdue Fort Wayne Mastodons (Horizon League) (2021–2026)
2021–22	Purdue Fort Wayne	9–21	7–14	9th	
2022–23	Purdue Fort Wayne	14–19	9–11	6th	
2023–24	Purdue Fort Wayne	23–13	13–7	3rd	
2024–25	Purdue Fort Wayne	27–9	18–2	2nd	
2025–26	Purdue Fort Wayne	21–14	12–8	T-4th	
Purdue Fort Wayne:		94–76 (.553)	59–42 (.584)		
Butler Bulldogs (Big East Conference) (2026–present)
2026–27	Butler	0–0	0–0		
Butler:		0–0 (–)	0–0 (–)		
Total:		155–130 (.544)			
National champion Postseason invitational champion Conference regular season champion Conference regular season and conference tournament champion Division regular season champion Division regular season and conference tournament champion Conference tournament champion
