= 2011–12 Butler Bulldogs women's basketball team =

Intercollegiate basketball season

2011–12 Butler Bulldogs women's basketball
- Conference: Horizon League
- Record: 13–17 (9–9 Horizon)
- Head coach: Beth Couture (10th season)
- Assistant coaches: Amy Cherubini (6th season); Tisha Hill (2nd season); Ashley Hayes (1st season)
- Home arena: Hinkle Fieldhouse

The 2011–12 Butler Bulldogs women's basketball team represented Butler University in the 2011–12 NCAA Division I women's basketball season. Their head coach was Beth Couture, serving her 10th year. The Bulldogs played their home games at the Hinkle Fieldhouse, which has a capacity of approximately 10,000. This was Butler's last season competing in the Horizon League.

== Roster ==
2011–12 Butler Bulldogs women's basketball team
Players
Coaches

Pos.	#	Name	Height	Year	Previous school	Hometown
F	20	Becca Bornhorst	6 ft 1 in (1.85 m)	Jr	Dublin-Coffman	Dublin, Ohio
G	25	Devin Brierly	5 ft 9 in (1.75 m)	Sr	Southwestern	Hanover, Indiana
G	12	Terra Burns	5 ft 8 in (1.73 m)	RS Sr	Peoria	Peoria, Illinois
G	22	Jenna Cobb	5 ft 7 in (1.7 m)	So	Miami Trace	New Holland, Ohio
C	50	Sarah Hamm	6 ft 2 in (1.88 m)	So	Winchester	Winchester, Indiana
G/F	13	Elizabeth Jennings	6 ft 1 in (1.85 m)	Jr	Lapel	Anderson, Indiana
G	33	Kaley May	5 ft 10 in (1.78 m)	Sr	Avon	Avon, Indiana
G	10	Mandy McDivitt	5 ft 8 in (1.73 m)	So	Connersville	Connersville, Indiana
G	11	Hannah Douglas	5 ft 9 in (1.75 m)	Fr	Pendleton Heights	Pendleton, Indiana
G/F	3	Haley Howard	5 ft 11 in (1.8 m)	Fr	Whiteland	Whiteland, Indiana
G/F	2	Jessika Lark	5 ft 8 in (1.73 m)	Fr	Pendleton Heights	Pendleton, Indiana
F	23	Daress McClung	6 ft 0 in (1.83 m)	So	Lawrence North (Cincinnati)	Indianapolis, Indiana
F	32	Amanda Raker	6 ft 1 in (1.85 m)	Fr	Perry Meridian	Indianapolis, Indiana

Head coach

- Beth Couture (Erskine)

Assistant coach(es)

- Amy Cherubini (Indiana)
- Tisha Hill (Indiana)
- Ashley Hayes (Michigan State)

Legend

- (C) Team captain
- (S) Suspended
- (I) Ineligible
- (W) Walk-on
- Injured
- Current redshirt

Roster
Last update: 29 September 2011

Source: 2011-12 Butler Women's Basketball Roster

== Schedule ==
Date time, TV	Rank^{#}	Opponent^{#}	Result	Record	High points	High rebounds	High assists	Site (attendance) city, state
Exhibition
Oct. 30*; 2:00 pm, no		St. Francis	W 76–59	–	22 – Hamm	– – –	– – –	Hinkle Fieldhouse (–); Indianapolis, IN
Non-conference regular season
Nov. 12*; 4:30 pm, no		vs. UNLV; Iowa Tournament	L 39–62	0–1	11 – McDivitt	6 – Douglas	3 – Cobb & Douglas	Carver–Hawkeye Arena (–); Iowa City, IA
Nov. 13*; 12:00 pm, no		Harvard; Iowa Tournament	W 69–68	1–1	17 – Burns	9 – Burns	3 – Brierly & Burns	Carver–Hawkeye Arena (3,287); Iowa City, IA
Nov. 20*; 2:00 pm, no		at IPFW	L 60–68	1–2	20 – Brierly	6 – Hamm	6 – Burns	Gates Sports Center (321); Fort Wayne, IN
Nov. 25*; 3:00 pm, no		at Nevada; Nevada Tournament	L 69–71	1–3	19 – Howard	6 – Hamm	5 – Burns	Lawlor Events Center (–); Reno, NV
Nov. 26*; 5:00 pm, no		vs. Iowa State; Nevada Tournament	L 44–64	1–4	10 – Howard	4 – Hamm	2 – three tied	Lawlor Events Center (148); Reno, NV
Nov. 30*; 7:00 pm, no		Bradley	L 63–71	1–5	18 – Brierly	5 – Cobb & Hamm	6 – Brierly	Hinkle Fieldhouse (508); Indianapolis, IN
Dec. 3*; 2:00 pm, no		at Bowling Green	L 61–71	1–6	15 – Douglas	5 – Douglas	3 – Brierly	Stroh Center (1,697); Bowling Green, OH
Dec. 6*; 7:05 pm, no		at Indiana State	L 46–49	1–7	17 – Howard	10 – Cobb	3 – Howard	Hulman Center (2,899); Terre Haute, IN
Dec. 9*; 7:00 pm, no		Ball State	W 55–43	2–7	22 – Brierly	7 – Douglas & Hamm	3 – Douglas	Hinkle Fieldhouse (757); Indianapolis, IN
Dec. 17*; 11:00 am, no		Marian	W 74–39	3–7	18 – Howard	9 – Howard & Hamm	4 – Brierly	Hinkle Fieldhouse (583); Indianapolis, IN
Dec. 21*; 12:00 pm, no		IUPUI	W 58–50	4–7	14 – Brierly	7 – Douglas	2 – Douglas & Cobb	Hinkle Fieldhouse (621); Indianapolis, IN
Horizon League Play
Dec. 29; 7:00 pm, no		at Detroit	L 60–72	4–8 (0–1)	15 – Brierly	7 – Bornhorst & McDivitt	2 – Brierly & Cobb	Calihan Hall (328); Detroit, MI
Dec. 31; 8:00 pm, no		at Wright State	L 47–48	4–9 (0–2)	15 – Hamm	8 – Raker	2 – three tied	Ervin J. Nutter Center (372); Fairborn, OH
Jan. 5; 7:00 pm, no		Youngstown State	W 73–64	5–9 (1–2)	19 – Brierly	6 – four tied	4 – Brierly	Hinkle Fieldhouse (384); Indianapolis, IN
Jan. 7; 2:00 pm, no		Cleveland State	W 67–43	6–9 (2–2)	14 – Hamm	5 – Bornhorst & Hamm	5 – Douglas	Hinkle Fieldhouse (556); Indianapolis, IN
Jan. 14; 2:30 pm, no		at Valparaiso	L 53–58	6–10 (2–3)	18 – McDivitt	6 – Douglas & Howard	7 – Brierly	Athletics-Recreation Center (639); Valparaiso, IN
Jan. 19; 8:00 pm, no		at UIC	L 42–77	6–11 (2–4)	23 – Hamm	7 – Hamm	3 – Brierly	UIC Pavilion (–); Chicago, IL
Jan. 21; 3:00 pm, no		at Loyola	W 60–57	7–11 (3–4)	18 – Hamm	8 – Hamm	5 – Cobb	Joseph J. Gentile Arena (428); Chicago, IL
Jan. 26; 7:00 pm, no		Green Bay	L 36–60	7–12 (3–5)	9 – Brierly	10 – Cobb	2 – Brierly	Hinkle Fieldhouse (942); Indianapolis, IN
Jan. 28; 2:00 pm, no		Milwaukee	W 76–63	8–12 (4–5)	30 – Hamm	11 – Hamm	8 – Bornhorst	Hinkle Fieldhouse (665); Indianapolis, IN
Feb. 2; 7:00 pm, no		at Cleveland State	W 68–62	9–12 (5–5)	21 – Cobb	11 – Hamm	4 – Bornhorst	Wolstein Center (207); Cleveland, OH
Feb. 4; 2:05 pm, no		at Youngstown State	W 65–63	10–12 (6–5)	22 – Brierly	7 – Brierly	7 – Cobb	Beeghly Center (1,234); Youngstown, OH
Feb. 11; 2:00 pm, no		Valparaiso	L 59–72	10–13 (6–6)	20 – Brierly	6 – Bornhorst	2 – four tied	Hinkle Fieldhouse (1,429); Indianapolis, IN
Feb. 16; 7:00 pm, no		Loyola	W 72–46	11–13 (7–6)	21 – Brierly	8 – Hamm	3 – three tied	Hinkle Fieldhouse (465); Indianapolis, IN
Feb. 18; 2:00 pm, no		UIC	W 51–48	12–13 (8–6)	18 – Hamm	12 – Bornhorst	6 – Cobb	Hinkle Fieldhouse (597); Indianapolis, IN
Feb. 23; 8:00 pm, no		at Milwaukee	L 52–54	12–14 (8–7)	11 – Cobb & Douglas	9 – Bornhorst & Hamm	4 – Brierly	Klotsche Center (312); Milwaukee, WI
Feb. 25; 3:00 pm, no		at Green Bay	L 53–78	12–15 (8–8)	12 – McDivitt	7 – Bornhorst	5 – Cobb	Kress Events Center (4,018); Green Bay, WI
Mar. 1; 7:00 pm, no		Detroit	L 52–57	12–16 (8–9)	23 – Howard	7 – Bornhorst & Cobb	2 – Cobb & Douglas	Hinkle Fieldhouse (542); Indianapolis, IN
Mar. 3; 2:00 pm, no		Wright State	W 81–66	13–16 (9–9)	31 – Douglas	5 – Brierly & Cobb	7 – Brierly	Hinkle Fieldhouse (888); Indianapolis, IN
Horizon League Tournament
Mar. 7; 8:00 pm, no		UIC; Quarterfinal	L 53–66	13–17	15 – Brierly & McDivitt	5 – Bornhorst	5 – Brierly	UIC Pavilion (403); Chicago, IL
*Non-conference game. ^{#}Rankings from Coaches' Poll. (#) Tournament seedings in parentheses. All times are in Eastern Time. HLN = Horizon League Network..

Source: 2011-12 Butler Bulldogs women's basketball schedule
