= Kurt Godlevske =

American basketball player and coach

Playing career
- 1989–1991: Michigan Tech
- 1992–1994: Northern Michigan

Coaching career (HC unless noted)
- 2013–2014: Butler (assistant)
- 2014–2022: Butler

Head coaching record
- Overall: 91–144 (.387)

Kurt Godlevske is a former head coach of the women's basketball coach at Butler University. He was named the interim head coach and later the official head coach after the termination of his predecessor, Beth Couture. Prior to his role as head coach, Godlevske served one year as an assistant at Butler after seven years as the head women's basketball coach at Bedford North Lawrence High School, where he compiled a 120–41 record, including a 28–0 mark in his final season when the team won the 2013 Class 4A Indiana High School Athletic Association state championship.

== Personal life and education ==
Godlevske attended Bedford North Lawrence High School before moving to L'Anse, Michigan in 1987; he later coached basketball at both schools. He graduated from L'Anse High School in 1989 and went on to play collegiately at Michigan Technological University before transferring to Northern Michigan University. Upon completing his undergraduate degree, Godlevske coached two seasons at NCAA Division II Lake Superior State, earning a 35–19 record. He changed to a high school coach, serving two seasons as the head boys basketball coach for his alma mater, the L'Anse Purple Hornets, where he coached Derrick Danner, then as an assistant coach at Lawrence North High School for one season, followed by two seasons as the head boys basketball coach and the head girls basketball coach in Newberry, Michigan. Godlevske last coached at the high school level at Bedford North Lawrence, where he led the girls basketball team to a 28–0 record and the IHSAA Class 4A Girls Basketball State Championship in 2013. He posted a 120–41 record in seven seasons at Bedford North Lawrence High School.

== Head coaching record ==
=== Women's basketball ===
Record table
Season	Team	Overall	Conference	Standing	Postseason
Butler Bulldogs (Big East Conference) (2014–2022)
2014–15	Butler	14–16	10–8	T–5th	
2015–16	Butler	10–21	4–14	9th	
2016–17	Butler	6–25	2–16	10th	
2017–18	Butler	15–17	6–12	8th	
2018–19	Butler	23–10	11–7	3rd	WNIT Third Round
2019–20	Butler	19–11	11–7	T-3rd	
2020–21	Butler	3–17	3–15	11th	
2021–22	Butler	1–27	0–18	11th	
Butler:		91–144 (.387)	47–97 (.326)		
Total:		91–144 (.387)			
National champion Postseason invitational champion Conference regular season champion Conference regular season and conference tournament champion Division regular season champion Division regular season and conference tournament champion Conference tournament champion
