= 2021 Big South Conference women's basketball tournament =

- Classification: Division I
- Season: 2020–21
- Teams: 10
- Site: Campus sites (first round) #1 and #2 seeds (quarterfinals and semifinals); Highest remaining seed (championship)
- Champions: High Point (1st title)
- Winning coach: Chelsea Banbury (1st title)

2020–21 Big South women's basketball standings
	Conf.				Overall
Team	W		L	PCT	W		L	PCT
High Point†	17	–	3	.850	22	–	7	.759
Campbell	11	–	4	.733	16	–	7	.696
Longwood	12	–	6	.667	14	–	11	.560
Gardner–Webb	10	–	7	.588	11	–	13	.458
Presbyterian	10	–	8	.556	11	–	10	.524
Radford	9	–	9	.500	9	–	11	.450
UNC Asheville	9	–	10	.474	10	–	15	.400
Winthrop	5	–	15	.250	6	–	18	.250
USC Upstate	5	–	11	.313	8	–	15	.348
Hampton	4	–	9	.308	4	–	11	.267
Charleston Southern	4	–	14	.222	6	–	17	.261
† 2021 Big South tournament winner Hampton suspended their season on March 2. As of July 7, 2024; Rankings from AP poll

The 2021 Big South women's basketball tournament was the postseason women's basketball tournament that ended the 2020–21 season of the Big South Conference. It was held March 6 through March 14, 2021, at various campus sites. High Point won the tournament, its first title since joining the conference, receiving an automatic bid to the NCAA tournament.

== Sites ==
The first round was played at campus sites at the home of the higher seed. The quarterfinals and semifinals were played at #1 and #2 seeds. The championship game was held at the home arena of the higher surviving seed.

== Seeds ==
All of the conference teams, except for Hampton and Radford, were eligible for the tournament. Hampton cancelled their season after going 4-11, and Radford wasn't able to have the required number of players, so they would not compete in the conference tournament. The top seven teams received a first-round bye. This season, the team seeds were determined firstly by record (75%) within the conference and then by a "ranking index formula" (RIF) developed by the Big South for those teams affected by pauses in their schedules due to COVID-19 (25%).

Seed	School	Conference	Overall	RIF
1	High Point‡	17–3	19–6	.888
2	Campbell	11–4	14–6	.737
3	Longwood	12–6	13–10	.725
4	Gardner-Webb	10–7	10–12	.654
5	Presbyterian	10–8	11–9	.642
6	UNC Asheville	9–10	10–14	.593
7	Winthrop	5–15	6–17	.438
8	USC Upstate	5–11	7–14	.435
9	Charleston-Southern	4–14	6–16	.392
‡ – Big South regular season champion. Overall records are as of the end of the regular season.

== Schedule ==
Game	Time	Matchup	Television	Attendance
First round – Saturday, March 6 Campus sites
1	2:00 pm	No. 9 Charleston Southern 64 at No. 8 USC Upstate 72	ESPN3	
Quarterfinals – Monday, March 8 Campus Sites
2	6:00 pm	No. 8 USC Upstate 63 at No. 1 High Point 85	ESPN3	
3	7:00 pm	No. 5 Presbyterian 62 at No. 4 Gardner–Webb 66	ESPN3	
4	6:00 pm	No. 7 Winthrop 41 at No. 2 Campbell 54	ESPN3	
5	7:00 pm	No. 6 UNC Asheville 69 at No. 3 Longwood 83	ESPN3	
Semifinals – Thursday, March 11 at #1 and #2 seeds
6	6:00 pm	No. 4 Gardner–Webb 58 vs. No. 1 High Point 75	ESPN+	
7	7:00 pm	No. 3 Longwood 39 vs. No. 2 Campbell 54	ESPN+	
Championship – Sunday, March 14 at Highest Remaining Seed
8	2:00 pm	No. 2 Campbell 46 vs. No. 1 High Point 62	ESPN+	
*Game times in ET. Rankings denote tournament seeding.

== Bracket ==
First round Saturday, March 6 ESPN3
9	Charleston Southern	64
8	USC Upstate	72

Quarterfinals; Monday, March 8 ESPN3
2	Campbell	54
7	Winthrop	41
6	UNC Asheville	69
3	Longwood	83
1	High Point	85
8	USC Upstate	63
5	Presbyterian	62
4	Gardner–Webb	66

Semifinals; Thursday, March 11; ESPN+
2	Campbell	54
3	Longwood	39
1	High Point	75
4	Gardner–Webb	58

Championship; Sunday, March 14; ESPN+
2	Campbell	46
1	High Point	62

== See also ==
- 2021 Big South Conference men's basketball tournament
