= 2021 Horizon League women's basketball tournament =

2021 women's basketball championship tournament for the NCAA Division I Horizon League

- Classification: Division I
- Season: 2020–21
- Teams: 11
- Site: Indiana Farmers Coliseum; Indianapolis, Indiana
- Champions: Wright State (3rd title)
- Winning coach: Katrina Merriweather (2nd title)
- Television: ESPN+, ESPNU

2020–21 Horizon League women's basketball standings
	Conf.				Overall
Team	W		L	PCT	W		L	PCT
Wright State†	15	–	5	.750	19	–	8	.704
Milwaukee	15	–	5	.750	20	–	8	.714
Green Bay	14	–	4	.778	15	–	7	.682
Oakland	12	–	8	.600	12	–	12	.500
IUPUI	11	–	3	.786	15	–	5	.750
Cleveland State	9	–	7	.563	15	–	8	.652
Youngstown State	8	–	8	.500	9	–	9	.500
Northern Kentucky	7	–	5	.583	8	–	11	.421
Robert Morris	4	–	12	.250	4	–	13	.235
Purdue Fort Wayne	1	–	19	.050	1	–	22	.043
UIC	1	–	13	.071	3	–	16	.158
Detroit Mercy	1	–	9	.100	1	–	13	.071
Detroit Mercy suspended their season on January 21, 2021
† 2021 Horizon League Tournament winner As of July 7, 2024; Rankings from AP poll

The 2021 Horizon League women's basketball tournament was the postseason women's basketball tournament for the 2020–21 season in the Horizon League. The tournament was held February 25–March 9, 2021. Wright State won the tournament and received an automatic invitation to the 2021 NCAA Division I women's basketball tournament.

== Seeds ==
Teams are seeded by record within the conference. Eleven of the twelve teams in the conference will qualify for the tournament, as Detroit Mercy did not complete their season.

Seed	School	Conference
1	Wright State	15–5
2	Milwaukee	15–5
3	Green Bay	14–4
4	Oakland	12–8
5	IUPUI	11–3
6	Cleveland State	8–8
7	Youngstown State	9–7
8	Northern Kentucky	7–5
9	Robert Morris	4–12
10	Purdue Fort Wayne	1–19
11	UIC	1–13

== Schedule ==
Game	Time	Matchup	Television	Attendance
First round – Thursday, February 25
1	5:00 PM	No. 10 Purdue Fort Wayne 59 vs. No. 7 Youngstown State 62	ESPN+	
2	7:00 PM	No. 11 UIC 43 vs. No. 6 Cleveland State 69	ESPN+	
3	7:00 PM	No. 9 Robert Morris 54 vs. No. 8 Northern Kentucky 68	ESPN+	
Quarterfinals – Tuesday, March 2
4	2:00 PM	No. 8 Northern Kentucky 56 vs. No. 1 Wright State 74	ESPN+	
5	3:00 PM	No. 5 IUPUI 86 vs No. 4 Oakland 64	ESPN+	
6	8:00 PM	No. 6 Cleveland State 69 vs. No. 3 Green Bay 63	ESPN+	
7	8:00 PM	No. 7 Youngstown State 68 vs. No. 2 Milwaukee 77	ESPN+	
Semifinals – Monday, March 8
8	11:00 AM	No. 6 Cleveland State 62 vs. No. 1 Wright State 73	ESPN+	
9	2:00 PM	No. 5 IUPUI 56 vs. No. 2 Milwaukee 46	ESPN+	
Championship – Tuesday, March 9
10	Noon	No. 5 IUPUI 41 vs. No. 1 Wright State 53	ESPNU	
Game times in ET. Rankings denote tournament seed.

== Bracket ==
First round Thursday, February 25
8	Northern Kentucky	68
9	Robert Morris	54
6	Cleveland State	69
11	UIC	43
7	Youngstown State	62
10	Purdue Fort Wayne	59

Quarterfinals; Tuesday, March 2
1	Wright State	74
8	Northern Kentucky	56
4	Oakland	64
5	IUPUI	86
3	Green Bay	63
6	Cleveland State	69
2	Milwaukee	77
7	Youngstown State	68

Semifinals; Monday, March 8
6	Cleveland State	62
1	Wright State	73
2	Milwaukee	46
5	IUPUI	56

Championship; Tuesday, March 9
1	Wright State	53
5	IUPUI	41

== See also ==
- 2021 Horizon League men's basketball tournament
- Horizon League women's basketball tournament
