= 2021 Ohio Valley Conference women's basketball tournament =

- Classification: Division I
- Season: 2020–21
- Teams: 8
- Site: Ford Center; Evansville, Indiana
- Champions: Belmont (5th title)
- Winning coach: Bart Brooks (3rd title)
- MVP: Destinee Wells (Belmont)
- Television: ESPN+

2020–21 Ohio Valley Conference women's basketball standings
	Conf.				Overall
Team	W		L	PCT	W		L	PCT
UT Martin	17	–	2	.895	22	–	6	.786
Belmont †	14	–	3	.824	21	–	6	.778
Southeast Missouri State	13	–	7	.650	15	–	11	.577
Jacksonville State	12	–	7	.632	15	–	9	.625
Tennessee Tech	12	–	8	.600	15	–	10	.600
Murray State	12	–	8	.600	16	–	11	.593
Austin Peay	10	–	8	.556	12	–	11	.522
Eastern Illinois	9	–	11	.450	11	–	15	.423
Eastern Kentucky	8	–	12	.400	9	–	15	.375
Morehead State	6	–	13	.316	7	–	16	.304
SIU Edwardsville	3	–	17	.150	6	–	19	.240
Tennessee State	0	–	20	.000	0	–	22	.000
† 2021 OVC tournament winner As of July 7, 2024; Rankings from AP poll

The 2021 Ohio Valley Conference women's basketball tournament ended the 2020–21 season of Ohio Valley Conference women's basketball. The tournament was held March 3–6, 2021, at Ford Center in Evansville, Indiana. The Belmont Bruins won the title, their fifth in the OVC, and will receive a bid to the 2021 NCAA Tournament.

== Seeds ==
Seed	School	Conf.	Over.	Tiebreaker
1	UT Martin	17–4	19–4	
2	Belmont	14–3	18–5	
3	Southeast Missouri State	13–7	15–10	
4	Jacksonville State	12–7	15–8	
5	Tennessee Tech	12–8	14–9	1–1 vs. Murray State; 1–0 vs. UT Martin
6	Murray State	12–8	15–10	1–1 vs. Tennessee Tech; 0–2 vs. UT Martin
7	Austin Peay	10–8	12–11	
8	Eastern Illinois	9–11	11–15	

== Schedule and results ==
Game	Time	Matchup	Score	Television
Quarterfinals – Wednesday, March 3
1	1:00 PM	No. 1 UT Martin vs. No. 8 Eastern Illinois	65–56	ESPN+
2	3:30 PM	No. 2 Belmont vs. No. 7 Austin Peay	54–50	ESPN+
Quarterfinals – Thursday, March 4
3	1:00 PM	No. 4 Jacksonville State vs. No. 5 Tennessee Tech	64–79	ESPN+
4	3:30 PM	No. 3 Southeast Missouri State vs. No. 6 Murray State	64–67	ESPN+
Semifinals – Friday, March 5
5	1:00 PM	No. 1 UT Martin vs. No. 5 Tennessee Tech	69–56	ESPN+
6	3:30 PM	No. 2 Belmont vs. No. 6 Murray State	67–49	ESPN+
Final – Saturday, March 6
7	2:00 PM	No. 1 UT Martin vs. No. 2 Belmont	75–83	ESPN+
*Game times in CST. Rankings denote tournament seed

== Bracket ==
- All times central.

Quarterfinals; Wednesday, March 3 Thursday, March 4 ESPN+
1	UT Martin	65
8	Eastern Illinois	56
4	Jacksonville State	64
5	Tennessee Tech	79
3	Southeast Missouri State	64
6	Murray State	67
2	Belmont	54
7	Austin Peay	50

Semifinals; Friday, March 5 ESPN+
1	UT Martin	69
5	Tennessee Tech	56
6	Murray State	49
2	Belmont	67

Championship; Saturday, March 6 ESPN+
1	UT Martin	75
2	Belmont	83
