= 2021 Big Sky Conference women's basketball tournament =

- Classification: Division I
- Season: 2020–21
- Teams: 11
- Site: Idaho Central Arena; Boise, Idaho
- Champions: Idaho State (4th title)
- Winning coach: Seton Sobolewski (2nd title)
- Television: Pluto TV

2020–21 Big Sky women's basketball standings
	Conf.				Overall
Team	W		L	PCT	W		L	PCT
Idaho State †	15	–	2	.882	22	–	4	.846
Idaho	14	–	3	.824	17	–	7	.708
Montana State	13	–	3	.813	17	–	7	.708
Northern Colorado	12	–	7	.632	14	–	11	.560
Northern Arizona	10	–	10	.500	15	–	14	.517
Montana	9	–	8	.529	12	–	11	.522
Portland State	7	–	11	.389	12	–	13	.480
Southern Utah	6	–	5	.545	11	–	9	.550
Eastern Washington	5	–	12	.294	6	–	17	.261
Weber State	2	–	16	.111	2	–	20	.091
Sacramento State	2	–	18	.100	3	–	21	.125
† Big Sky tournament winner As of July 7, 2024; Rankings from AP poll

The 2021 Big Sky Conference women's basketball tournament was the postseason basketball tournament held March 8–12, 2021, at Idaho Central Arena in Boise, Idaho. Idaho State won the tournament, their fourth title, earning an automatic bid to the 2021 NCAA tournament.

== Seeds ==
Seed	School	Conference	Overall
1	Idaho State	15–2	19–3
2	Idaho	14–3	15–6
3	Montana State	13–3	16–6
4	Northern Colorado	12–7	13–11
5	Southern Utah	6–5	9–8
6	Montana	9–8	12–10
7	Northern Arizona	10–10	12–12
8	Portland State	7–11	11–12
9	Eastern Washington	5–12	6–16
10	Weber State	2–16	2–19
11	Sacramento State	2–18	2–21

== Schedule ==
Session	Game	Time	Matchup	Score	Television
First Round – Monday, March 8
1	1	2:00 PM	No. 8 Portland State vs. No. 9 Eastern Washington	71–51	
1	2	5:00 PM	No. 7 Northern Arizona vs. No. 10 Weber State	82–68	
1	3	8:00 PM	No. 6 Montana vs. No. 11 Sacramento State	65–68	
Quarterfinals – Tuesday, March 9
2	4	11:00 AM	No. 8 Portland State vs. No. 1 Idaho State	50–66	
2	5	2:00 PM	No. 4 Northern Colorado vs. No. 5 Southern Utah	63–59	
3	6	5:00 PM	No. 7 Northern Arizona vs. No. 2 Idaho	53–67	
3	7	8:00 PM	No. 11 Sacramento State vs. No. 3 Montana State	55–66	
Semifinals – Wednesday, March 10
4	8	6:00 PM	No. 1 Idaho State vs. No. 4 Northern Colorado 55	65–55	
4	9	9:00 PM	No. 2 Idaho vs. No. 3 Montana State	80–64	
Championship Game – Friday, March 12
5	10	Noon	No. 1 Idaho State vs. No. 2 Idaho	84–49	
Game times in MT. Rankings denote tournament seeds.

== Bracket ==
First round March 8
8	Portland State	71
9	Eastern Washington	51
7	Northern Arizona	82
10	Weber State	68
6	Montana	58
11	Sacramento State	65

Quarterfinals; March 9
1	Idaho State	66
8	Portland State	50
4	Northern Colorado	63
5	Southern Utah	59
2	Idaho	67
7	Northern Arizona	53
3	Montana State	66
11	Sacramento State	55

Semifinals; March 10
1	Idaho State	65
4	Northern Colorado	55
2	Idaho	80
3	Montana State	64

Championship; March 12
1	Idaho State	84
2	Idaho	49
