= 2021 MEAC women's basketball tournament =

Basketball tournament in Virginia, US

- Classification: Division I
- Season: 2020–21
- Teams: 6
- Site: Norfolk Scope; Norfolk, Virginia
- Champions: North Carolina A&T (5th title)
- Winning coach: Tarrell Robinson (3rd title)
- MVP: Jayla Jones-Pack (North Carolina A&T)
- Television: FloHoops, ESPN3

2020–21 MEAC women's basketball standings
	Conf.				Overall
Team	W		L	PCT	W		L	PCT
North
Howard	10	–	2	.833	15	–	4	.789
Morgan State	8	–	2	.800	12	–	4	.750
Delaware State	2	–	8	.200	3	–	12	.200
Coppin State	2	–	10	.167	2	–	13	.133
South
North Carolina A&T†	9	–	1	.900	14	–	3	.824
Norfolk State	3	–	5	.375	5	–	9	.357
North Carolina Central	2	–	6	.250	4	–	12	.250
South Carolina State	0	–	2	.000	1	–	9	.100
† 2021 MEAC tournament winner South Carolina State suspended their season on February 3, 2021; Delaware State suspended their season on March 3, 2021; As of February 16, 2021; Rankings from AP poll NOTE: Bethune–Cookman, Florida A&M, and Maryland Eastern Shore will not play in the 2020–21 season due to COVID-19 concerns.

The 2021 MEAC women's basketball tournament (officially known as the 2021 Air Force Reserve MEAC Basketball Tournament due to sponsorship reasons) was the postseason women's basketball tournament for the 2020–21 season in the Mid-Eastern Athletic Conference. The tournament was held March 11–13, 2021. The tournament winner received an automatic invitation to the 2021 NCAA Division I women's basketball tournament. North Carolina A&T won the conference tournament championship game over Howard, 59–57.

== Seeds ==
In a deviation from the format used in previous years, the 2021 edition of the tournament seeded teams using their divisional placement, rather than their finish in the conference as a whole.

Division	Seed	School	Conference	Tiebreaker 1
Northern	N1	Howard	10–2	
Northern	N2	Morgan State	8–2	
Northern	N3	Coppin State	2–10	
Southern	S1	North Carolina A&T	9–1	
Southern	S2	Norfolk State	3–5	
Southern	S3	North Carolina Central	2–6	

== Schedule ==
Game	Time*	Matchup^{#}	Score	Television
Quarterfinals – Thursday, March 11, 2021
1	12:00 p.m.	(N3) Coppin State vs. (S2) Norfolk State	45-56	FloHoops
2	2:00 p.m.	(S3) North Carolina Central vs. (N2) Morgan State	64-74	FloHoops
Semifinals – Friday, March 12, 2021
3	12:00 p.m.	(S2) Norfolk State vs. (N1) Howard	44-50	FloHoops
4	2:00 p.m.	(N2) Morgan State vs. (S1) North Carolina A&T	54-69	FloHoops
Championship – Saturday, March 13, 2021
5	3:30 p.m.	(N1) Howard vs. (S1) North Carolina A&T	57-59	ESPN3
*All times Eastern. ^{#}Rankings denote tournament seeding.

== Bracket ==
Quarterfinals; Thursday, March 11; FloHoops
N3	Coppin State	45
S2	Norfolk State	56
S3	North Carolina Central	64
N2	Morgan State	74

Semifinals; Friday, March 12; FloHoops
N1	Howard	50
S2	Norfolk State	44
N2	Morgan State	54
S1	North Carolina A&T	69

Championship; Saturday, March 13; ESPN3
N1	Howard	57
S1	North Carolina A&T	59

== See also ==
- 2021 MEAC men's basketball tournament
- MEAC women's basketball tournament
