= 2021 SWAC women's basketball tournament =

- Classification: Division I
- Season: 2020–21
- Teams: 8
- Site: Bartow Arena; Birmingham, Alabama
- Champions: Jackson State (8th title)
- Winning coach: Tomekia Reed (1st title)
- MVP: Dayzsha Rogan (Jackson State)
- Television: ESPN3

2020–21 SWAC women's basketball standings
	Conf.				Overall
Team	W		L	PCT	W		L	PCT
Jackson State†	14	–	1	.933	18	–	6	.750
Alabama State	14	–	3	.824	16	–	4	.800
Southern	11	–	4	.733	12	–	11	.522
Alabama A&M	8	–	5	.615	10	–	7	.588
Grambling State	8	–	6	.571	10	–	10	.500
Alcorn State	7	–	8	.467	7	–	13	.350
Texas Southern	4	–	8	.333	5	–	10	.333
Prairie View A&M	2	–	11	.154	3	–	13	.188
Mississippi Valley State	2	–	13	.133	4	–	16	.200
Arkansas-Pine Bluff	2	–	13	.133	3	–	18	.143
† 2021 SWAC tournament winner As of July 7, 2024; Rankings from AP poll

The 2021 SWAC women's basketball tournament was a postseason women's basketball tournament taking place March 10–13, 2021. The tournament was held at Bartow Arena in Birmingham, Alabama. Jackson State received the Southwestern Athletic Conference's automatic bid to the 2021 NCAA Division I women's basketball tournament.

Unlike most NCAA Division I basketball conference tournaments, the SWAC tournament does not include all of the league's teams. The tournament instead features only the top eight teams from regular-season SWAC play.

== Seeds ==
Seed	School	Conference record	Overall record
1	Jackson State	14–1	15–5
2	Alabama State	14–3	14–3
3	Southern	11–4	11–10
4	Grambling State	8–6	9–9
5	Alabama A&M	8–5	10–6
6	Alcorn State	7–8	7–12
7	Texas Southern	4–8	5–9
8	Mississippi Valley State	2–13	4–15

== Schedule ==
All tournament games are streamed on ESPN3.

Session	Game	Time	Matchup	Television	Attendance
Quarterfinals – Wednesday, March 10 and Thursday, March 11
March 10	1	Noon	No. 2 Alabama State 85 vs. No. 7 Texas Southern 69	ESPN3	
March 10	2	6:30 PM	No. 1 Jackson State 70 vs. No. 8 Mississippi Valley State 47	ESPN3	
March 11	3	Noon	No. 3 Southern 73 vs. No. 6 Alcorn State 59	ESPN3	
March 11	4	6:30 PM	No. 4 Grambling State 58 vs. No. 5 Alabama A&M 50	ESPN3	
Semifinals – Friday, March 12
3	5	Noon	No. 2 Alabama State 69 vs. No. 3 Southern 60	ESPN3	
3	6	6:30 PM	No. 1 Jackson State 65 vs. No. 4 Grambling State 49	ESPN3	
Championship Game – Saturday, March 13
4	7	2:30 PM	No. 2 Alabama State 66 vs. No. 1 Jackson State 67	ESPN3	
Game times in EST. Rankings denote tournament seeding.

== Bracket ==
Quarterfinals; March 10 & 11; ESPN3
1	Jackson State	70
8	Mississippi Valley State	47
4	Grambling State	58
5	Alabama A&M	50
3	Southern	73
6	Alcorn State	59
2	Alabama State	85
7	Texas Southern	69

Semifinals; Friday, March 12; ESPN3
1	Jackson State	65
4	Grambling State	49
3	Southern	60
2	Alabama State	69

Championship; Saturday, March 13; ESPN3, 2:30 pm
1	Jackson State	67
2	Alabama State	66

== See also ==
- 2021 SWAC men's basketball tournament
