= Butler Bulldogs women's basketball =

Butler Bulldogs
2026–27 Butler Bulldogs women's basketball team
- University: Butler University
- Head coach: Maria Marchesano (1st season)
- Location: Indianapolis, Indiana
- Arena: Hinkle Fieldhouse (capacity: 9,100)
- Conference: Big East
- Nickname: Bulldogs
- Colors: Blue and white
- Student section: Dawg Pound

NCAA Division I tournament appearances
- 1996

Conference tournament champions
- 1996 (MCC)

Conference regular-season champions
- 1993, 1998

Uniforms
Home	Away

The Butler Bulldogs women's basketball team represents Butler University in Indianapolis, Indiana, United States. The school's team currently competes in the Big East after moving from the Atlantic 10 following the 2012–2013 season. The Bulldogs had competed in the Horizon since joining Division I competition in the 1986–1987 season. The women's basketball team began competing in the IAIAW in 1975–1976 under coach Xandra Hamilton and had their first winning season two years later, obtaining a 9–5 record under coach Linda Mason. The Bulldogs are currently coached by Maria Marchesano.

== History ==
The women's basketball program at Butler University began in the 1975–76 season, competing in the Association for Intercollegiate Athletics for Women (AIAW). The Bulldogs' first winning season came two years later, earning a 9–5 record under the direction of coach Linda Mason. The Bulldogs played in the AIAW National Tournament for the first time in 1982, falling in the second round to William Penn, 77–94. The next season, 1982–83, the Bulldogs began competition at the NCAA Division II level, where they competed for four seasons until they joined the Horizon League and Division I competition for the 1986–87 season.

The Bulldogs qualified for Division I post-season play for the first time in 1993, competing in the WNIT under coach Paulette Stein, who revitalized the program following five losing records in six seasons in the late 1980s. Butler competed in the NCAA Division I women's basketball tournament for the first time in 1996 under coach June Olkowski, Butler's only coach to never record a losing season. Their last post-season appearance in the 1990s was in the WNIT in 1998.

The Bulldogs began a new era during the 2002–03 season, in which Beth Couture was hired as the Bulldogs' seventh head coach, a position she still holds. Couture is Butler's longest-serving head women's basketball coach. From her first season at Butler through the 2012–2013 season, she compiled a 178–158 record including four total and three consecutive WNIT appearances, and four consecutive 20-win seasons. Under Couture, Butler recorded a 23–10 mark in 2010, the most wins in team history, and recorded its first WNIT win in 2009 with a 59–58 victory over Duquesne on a layup with 2.2 seconds remaining in the game.

The 2013–14 season was the Bulldogs' third conference in as many years, as Coach Couture guided the team in its transition to the Big East Conference after a single season in the Atlantic Ten Conference. During that season, the Bulldogs posted an 8–6 conference record (17–14 overall), giving the team winning records in two conferences during Couture's tenure.

== Records ==
=== Team ===
==== Points ====
- Points in a game: 116 — vs. Detroit, 1/30/99
- Points in a season: 2,434 — 1992–93
- Points per game: 78.5 — 1992–93
- Total points in a game: 217 — Butler (116) vs. Detroit (101), 1/30/99

==== Rebounds ====
- Rebounds in a game: 68 — vs. Indianapolis, 2/8/83
- Rebounds in a season: 1,256 — 1992–93
- Rebounds per game: 43.7 — 1982–83

==== Field goals ====
- Field goals made in a game: 49 — vs. Southern Indiana, 1/28/83
- Field goals made in a season: 878 — 1992–93
- Field goals attempted in a game: 95 — vs. Southern Indiana, 1/28/83
- Field goals attempted in a season: 1,947 — 1992–93
- Field goal percentage in a half: .909 — vs. Vanderbilt, 2nd half (20–22), 11/24/90
- Field goal percentage in a game: .659 — vs. Vanderbilt (31–47), 11/24/90
- Field goal percentage in a season: .480 — 1982–83 (786–1638)
- 3-point field goals made in a game: 15 — vs. Milwaukee, 2/22/07
- 3-point field goals made in a season: 260 — 2006–07
- 3-point field goals attempted in a game: 36 — vs. Green Bay, 1/25/07
- 3-point field goals attempted in a season: 711 — 2006–07
- 3-point field goal percentage in a game (min. 10 attempts): .700 — vs. Loyola (7–10), 1/6/96
- 3-point field goal percentage in a season: .393 — 2005–06 (223–567)

==== Free throws ====
- Free throws made in a game: 42 — vs. Radford, 11/29/97
- Free throws made in a season: 659 — 1997–98
- Free throws attempted in a game: 50

vs. UIC, 2/1/96
vs. Radford, 11/29/97

- Free throws attempted in a season: 864 — 1997–98
- Free throw percentage in a game (min. 10 attempts): 1.000 — vs. Xavier (13–13), 2/23/91
- Free throw percentage in a season: .771— 1998–99 (512–664)

==== Overall ====
- Wins in a season: 26 — 1980–81 (26–2)
- Consecutive victories: 23 — 1978–79

=== Individual ===
==== Single-game ====
- Points: 37

Sarah Bolten vs. Bowling Green, 12/4/01
Elza Purvlicis vs. St. Joseph’s (Ind.), 1/24/84

- Rebounds: 26, Elza Purvlicis vs. Indiana Central, 2/8/83
- Assists: 14

Melissa Kilgore vs. Marian, 1/14/86
Barb Skinner vs. Wright State, 2/5/83

- Field goals made: 16, Elza Purvlicis vs. St. Joseph's (Ind.), 1/24/84
- Field goals attempted: 32, Barb Skinner vs. Dayton, 3/2/83
- Field goal percentage (min. 7 made): 1.000

(13–13), Alexis Proffitt vs. Milwaukee, 2/6/97
(11–11), Chloe Hamilton vs. Green Bay, 1/27/11
(8–8), Kelly Kuhn vs. Wright State, 2/20/99
(7–7), Melanie Thornton vs. Cleveland State, 1/14/10
(7–7), Beth Piepenbrink vs. Eastern Illinois, 2/24/83
(7–7), Liesl Schultz vs. Maryland, 12/29/94

- 3-point field goals made: 7

Jackie Closser at Green Bay, 3/11/07
Jackie Closser vs. Wright State, 2/3/07
Alyssa Pittman at Dayton, 12/21/09
Maria Marchesano vs. Wright State, 2/27/02

- 3-point field goal attempts: 16, Lisa Pryor vs. Milwaukee, 1/25/03
- 3-point field goal percentage (min. 4 made): 1.000

(4–4), Ellen Hamilton at Eastern Illinois, 11/30/05
(4–4), Ellen Hamilton vs. Central Florida, 11/25/05
(4–4), Jackie Closser vs. Austin Peay, 11/26/04
(4–4), Maria Marchesano vs. UIC, 2/12/04
(4–4), Jackie Closser vs. UIC, 2/21/04
(4–4), Debbie Benziger vs. Wright State, 2/16/96
(4–4), Sarah Hurrle vs. Milwaukee, 2/6/97
(4–4), Jennifer Marlow vs. Bowling Green, 3/13/98
(4–4), Pam Schiefelbein vs. Detroit, 1/18/88
(4–4), Candace Jones vs. UIC, 1/12/08

- Free throws made: 15, Julie VonDielingen vs. Loyola, 2/28/91
- Free throw attempts: 20, Lade Akande at Cleveland State, 12/28/06
- Free throw percentage (min. 11 made): 1.000

(13–13), Shelley Roby vs. Evansville, 2/20/88
(12–12), Jackie Closser vs. UIC, 3/9/07
(12–12), Jackie Closser at Detroit, 1/18/07
(12–12), Jackie Closser at Detroit, 2/6/06
(12–12), Julie VonDielingen vs. Valparaiso, 12/4/90
(11–11), Kelly Kuhn vs. Cleveland State, 1/28/99
(11–11), Julie VonDielingen vs. Houston, 1/2/93
(11–11), Julie VonDielingen vs. Loyola, 2/6/93
(11–11), Julie VonDielingen vs. Marquette, 2/2/91

- Steals: 12, Jenna Cobb vs. Loyola, 2/16/12
- Blocked shots: 10, Kelly Kuhn vs. Brown, 12/3/00

==== Season ====
- Points: 622, Julie VonDielingen, 1992–93
- Scoring average: 20.2, Julie VonDielingen, 1990–91
- Rebounds: 302, Beth Piepenbrink, 1981–82
- Rebounding average: 13.7, Elza Purvlicis, 1983–84
- Assists: 195, Melissa Kilgore, 1987–88
- Assist average: 7.6, Barb Skinner, 1982–83
- Field goals made: 233, Julie VonDielingen, 1992–93
- Field goal attempts: 450, Julie VonDielingen, 1992–93
- Field goal percentage: .655 (55–84), Liesl Schultz, 1991–92
- 3-point field goals made: 85, Jackie Closser, 2006–07
- 3-point field goal attempts: 227, Jackie Closser, 2006–07
- 3-point field goal percentage: .517 (45–87), Jennifer Marlow, 1997–98
- Free throws made: 151, Julie VonDielingen, 1990–91
- Free throw attempts: 191, Sarah Schuetz, 1997–98
- Free throw percentage: .923 (72–78), Debbie Benziger, 1997–98
- Steals: 118, Liz Skinner, 1980–81
- Blocked shots: 103, Liesl Schultz, 1994–95
- Minutes played: 1,148, Jackie Closser, 2006–07

==== Career ====
- Points: 2,018, Julie VonDielingen, 1989–93
- Scoring average: 18.0, Julie VonDielingen, 1990–93
- Rebounds: 1,050, Elza Purvlicis, 1980–84
- Rebounding average: 11.4, Elza Purvlicis, 1981–84
- Assists: 584, Melissa Kilgore, 1985–88
- Assist average: 5.5, Melissa Kilgore, 1985–88
- Field goals made: 744, Julie VonDielingen, 1989–93
- Field goal attempts: 1,442, Barb Skinner, 1980–83
- Field goal percentage: .600 (404–673), Liesl Schultz, 1992–95
- 3-point field goals made: 271, Jackie Closser, 2004–07
- 3-point field goal attempts: 697, Jackie Closser, 2003–07
- 3-point field goal percentage: .443 (128–289), Jennifer Marlow, 1995–99
- Free throws made: 518, Julie VonDielingen, 1990–93
- Free throw attempts: 643, Julie VonDielingen, 1990–93
- Free throw percentage: .841 (280–333), Jackie Closser, 2004–07
- Steals: 419, Liz Skinner, 1979–82
- Blocked shots: 254, Liesl Schultz, 1992–95
- Minutes played: 3,751, Jackie Closser, 2004–07

== Year by year results ==
Record table
Season	Coach	Overall	Conference	Standing	Postseason
Xandra Hamilton (Independent) (1975–1976)
1975–76	Xandra Hamilton	1–9			
Xandra Hamilton:		1–9 (.100)			
Linda Mason (Independent) (1976–1984)
1976–77	Linda Mason	2–9			
1977–78	Linda Mason	9–5			
1978–79	Linda Mason	23–1			
1979–80	Linda Mason	21–1			
1980–81	Linda Mason	26–2			
1981–82	Linda Mason	23–3			
1982–83	Linda Mason	18–6			
1983–84	Linda Mason	2–20			
Linda Mason:		124–47 (.725)			
Russ Sarfaty (Horizon League) (1984–1988)
1984–85	Russ Sarfaty	4–24	1–13 (NSC)		
1985–86	Russ Sarfaty	4–23	1–13 (NSC)		
1986–87	Russ Sarfaty	10–17	3–9	T-5th	
1987–88	Russ Sarfaty	14–12	5–5	T-3rd	
Russ Sarfaty:		32–76 (.296)	10–40 (.200)		
Paulette Stein (Horizon League) (1988–1993)
1988–89	Paulette Stein	9–17	3–11	7th	
1989–90	Paulette Stein	20–9	12–4	2nd	
1990–91	Paulette Stein	21–8	10–6	T-2nd	
1991–92	Paulette Stein	14–15	5–7	5th	
1992–93	Paulette Stein	23–8	14–2	1st	WNIT
Paulette Stein:		85–57 (.604)	44–30 (.595)		
June Olkowski (Horizon League) (1993–1999)
1993–94	June Olkowski	13–13	6–6	5th	
1994–95	June Olkowski	21–6	12–2	2nd	
1995–96	June Olkowski	21–9	13–3	2nd	NCAA First Round
1996–97	June Olkowski	17–11	12–4	2nd	
1997–98	June Olkowski	25–6	13–1	1st	WNIT Second Round
1998–99	June Olkowski	17–11	9–5	3rd	
June Olkowski:		114–56 (.671)	65–21 (.756)		
Wendy Gatlin (Horizon League) (1999–2002)
1999-00	Wendy Gatlin	10–16	6–8	5th	
2000–01	Wendy Gatlin	8–20	3–11	T-7th	
2001–02	Wendy Gatlin	3–26	1–15	9th	
Wendy Gatlin:		21–62 (.253)	10–34 (.227)		
Beth Couture (Horizon League) (2002–2012)
2002–03	Beth Couture	6–23	3–13	T-8th	
2003–04	Beth Couture	14–15	9–7	T-4th	
2004–05	Beth Couture	14–14	8–8	5th	
2005–06	Beth Couture	15–14	9–7	4th	
2006–07	Beth Couture	16–15	11–5	T-2nd	
2007–08	Beth Couture	20–10	10–8	T-4th	
2008–09	Beth Couture	20–12	14–4	2nd	WNIT Second Round
2009–10	Beth Couture	23–10	14–4	T-2nd	WNIT First Round
2010–11	Beth Couture	20–14	12–6	T-2nd	WNIT First Round
2011–12	Beth Couture	13–17	9–9	5th	
Horizon League:			226–195 (.537)		
Beth Couture (Atlantic 10 Conference) (2012–2013)
2012–13	Beth Couture	17–14	8–6	6th	WNIT First Round
Atlantic 10:			8–6 (.571)		
Beth Couture (Big East Conference) (2013–2014)
2013–14	Beth Couture	15–16	10–8	6th	WNIT First Round
Beth Couture:		193–174 (.526)	99–71 (.582) Horizon; 8–6 (.571) Atlantic 10; 10–8 (.556) Big East		
Kurt Godlevske (Big East Conference) (2014–2022)
2014–15	Kurt Godlevske	14–16	10–8	6th	
2015–16	Kurt Godlevske	10–21	4–14	9th	
2016–17	Kurt Godlevske	6–25	2–16	10th	
2017–18	Kurt Godlevske	15–17	6–12	8th	
2018–19	Kurt Godlevske	23–10	11–7	3rd	WNIT Third Round
2019–20	Kurt Godlevske	19–11	11–7	5th	
2020–21	Kurt Godlevske	3–17	3–15	10th	
2021–22	Kurt Godlevske	1–27	0–18	11th	
Kurt Godlevske:		91–144 (.387)	47–97 (.326) Big East		
Austin Parkinson (Big East Conference) (2022–present)
2022–23	Austin Parkinson	11–19	6–14	8th	
2023–24	Austin Parkinson	15–17	6–12	8th	WNIT Second Round
2024–25	Austin Parkinson	16–18	5–13	9th	WNIT Super 16
Austin Parkinson:		42–54 (.438)	17–39 (.304) Big East		
Big East:			74–144 (.339)		
Total:		703–679 (.509)			
National champion Postseason invitational champion Conference regular season champion Conference regular season and conference tournament champion Division regular season champion Division regular season and conference tournament champion Conference tournament champion

== Postseason results ==
=== NCAA Division I tournament results ===
The Bulldogs have appeared in one NCAA tournament. Their record is 0–1.

Year	Seed	Round	Opponent	Result
1996	#15	First Round	Iowa	L 67–72

=== NCAA Division II tournament results ===
The Bulldogs made one appearance in the NCAA Division II women's basketball tournament. They had a combined record of 0–1.

Year	Round	Opponent	Result
1983	First Round	Dayton	L, 69–71

== WNIT results ==
The Bulldogs have appeared in eight Women's National Invitation Tournaments. Their combined record is 7–9.

Year	Round	Opponent	Result/Score
1993	First Round; Consolation Second Round; Consolation Third Round	Florida International; UNLV; Northwestern	L 75–79 (OT); W 74–71; L 85–89
1998	First Round; Second Round	Bowling Green; LSU	W 95–90; L 58–74
2009	First Round; Second Round	Duquesne; Marquette	W 59–58; L 49–58
2010	First Round	Illinois State	L 54–57
2011	First Round	Wisconsin	L 48–68
2019	First Round; Second Round; Third Round	Northeastern; Kent State; Cincinnati	W 89–72; W 70–52; L 65–72
2024	First Round; Second Round	Bowling Green; Purdue	W 75–63; L 62–51
2025	Second Round; Super 16	UIC; Purdue Fort Wayne	W 61–54; L 87–61

== Awards ==
Horizon League Women's Basketball Coach of the Year

- 1989–90 – Paulette Stein
- 1992–93 – Paulette Stein
- 1994–95 – June Olkowski
- 1995–96 – June Olkowski
- 1997–98 – June Olkowski

Horizon League Women's Basketball Player of the Year

- 1992–93 – Julie Von Dielingen
- 1997–98 – Sarah Schuetz
- 2009–10 – Melanie Thornton

First Team All-League

- 1989–90 – Julie Von Dielingen
- 1990–91 – Julie Von Dielingen
- 1991–92 – Julie Von Dielingen
- 1992–93 – Julie Von Dielingen
- 1994–95 – Liesl Schultz
- 1996–97 – Sarah Schuetz
- 1997–98 – Jennifer Marlow
- 1997–98 – Sarah Schuetz
- 1998–99 – Jennifer Marlow
- 2003–04 – Nancy Bowden
- 2005–06 – Jackie Closser
- 2006–07 – Jackie Closser
- 2007–08 – Lade Akande
- 2009–10 – Melanie Thornton
- 2009–10 – Brigid Mulroy

Second Team All-League

- 1986–87 – Martha Kondalski
- 1987–88 – Martha Kondalski
- 1987–88 – Pam Schiefelbein
- 1988–89 – Martha Kondalski
- 1992–93 – Mary Majewski
- 1993–94 – Liesl Schultz
- 1995–96 – Debbie Benziger
- 1996–97 – Jennifer Marlow
- 1996–97 – Alexis Proffitt
- 1998–99 – Sarah Hurrle
- 1999-00 – Kristen Bodine
- 2000–01 – Kelly Kuhn
- 2005–06 – Lade Akande
- 2006–07 – Lade Akande
- 2010–11 – Chloe Hamilton
- 2010–11 – Brittany Bowen
- 2011–12 – Sarah Hamm

Horizon League Women's Basketball Newcomer of the Year

- 1989–90 – Julie Von Dielingen
- 1990–91 – Angela Cotton

Horizon League All-Newcomer Team

- 1989–90 – Mary Majewski
- 1989–90 – Julie Von Dielingen
- 1990–91 – Angela Cotton
- 1991–92 – Lynn Bihn
- 1995–96 – Jennifer Marlow
- 1996–97 – Sarah Hurrle
- 1997–98 – Lori Ives
- 1998–99 – Kristen Bodine
- 1998–99 – Kelly Kuhn
- 1999-00 – Valerie Burg
- 2001–02 – Maria Marchesano
- 2003–04 – Ellen Hamilton
- 2004–05 – Cassie Freeman
- 2005–06 – Lade Akande
- 2006–07 – Susan Lester
- 2009–10 – Alyssa Pittman

Horizon League Tournament MVP

- 1995–96 – Debbie Benziger

Horizon League All-Tournament Team

- 1989–90 – Mary Majewski
- 1989–90 – Shelly Roby
- 1990–91 – Brandi Kimble
- 1990–91 – Julie Von Dielingen
- 1991–92 – Lynn Bihn
- 1991–92 – Julie Von Dielingen
- 1992–93 – Mary Majewski
- 1992–93 – Julie Von Dielingen
- 1995–96 – Debbie Benziger
- 1995–96 – Alexis Proffitt
- 1997–98 – Jennifer Marlow
- 1997–98 – Sarah Schuetz
- 2003–04 – Nancy Bowden
- 2005–06 – Lade Akande
- 2006–07 – Jackie Closser
- 2009–10 – Melanie Thornton
- 2009–10 – Susan Lester
- 2010–11 – Brittany Bowen

Horizon League Defensive Player of the Year

- 2009–10 – Melanie Thornton

Horizon League All-Defensive Team First awarded in 1995–96

- 1995–96 – Sarah Schuetz
- 1996–97 – Sarah Schuetz
- 1997–98 – Sarah Schuetz
- 1998–99 – Sarah Schuetz
- 2001–02 – Nancy Bowden
- 2002–03 – Nancy Bowden
- 2003–04 – Nancy Bowdrn
- 2003–04 – Angel Mason
- 2004–05 – Cortney Urquhart
- 2008–09 – Melanie Thornton
- 2009–10 – Melanie Thornton
- 2011–12 – Jenna Cobb

== Notable players ==
- Melani Thornton (Class of 2012) – Plays professionally in Brașov, Romania, for the BC Olimpia Brașov women's basketball team.
- Brittany Bowen (Class of 2011) – Played professionally in Horsens, Denmark, for the Horsens Pirates.
- Susan Lester (Class of 2010) – Plays professionally in Edirne, Turkey, for the Edirne Spor women's basketball team.
- Courtney Urquhart (Class of 2005) – Played professionally in Martigny, Switzerland, for the Ovronnaz-Martigny women's basketball team.
- Angel Mason (Class of 2004) – Played professionally in Reykjavík, Iceland, for team IS.

== Roster ==
2026–27 Butler Bulldogs women's basketball team
Players
Coaches

Pos.	#	Name	Height	Year	Previous school	Hometown
G	0	Laniah Wills	6 ft 0 in (1.83 m)	Fr	Lapel	Anderson, IN
G	1	Judit Valero	5 ft 11 in (1.8 m)	Sr	FIU	Sant Feliu de Llobregat, Spain
G	2	Destiny Macharia	5 ft 11 in (1.8 m)	So	Purdue Fort Wayne	Columbia, MD
F	6	Taya Ellis	6 ft 1 in (1.85 m)	Sr	Bowling Green	Toronto, Ontario
F/C	9	Olivia Hastings	6 ft 3 in (1.91 m)	Fr	Willoughby Girls	Sydney, Australia
G	11	Nevaeh Jackson	6 ft 0 in (1.83 m)	Sr	Valparaiso	Fort Wayne, IN
G	12	Saniya Jackson	6 ft 0 in (1.83 m)	RS Jr	Valparaiso	Fort Wayne, IN
G	13	Tamar Singer	5 ft 4 in (1.63 m)	Jr	Miami (OH)	Haifa, Israel
F	14	Lili Krasovec	6 ft 3 in (1.91 m)	Sr	Purdue Fort Wayne	Budapest, Hungary
G	20	Karina Bystry	5 ft 9 in (1.75 m)	So	Northern Kentucky	Englewood, TN
G	21	Lexi Baer	6 ft 2 in (1.88 m)	Fr	Peoria Notre Dame	Peoria, IL
G	32	Sage Miskel	5 ft 6 in (1.68 m)	Fr	Whitefish Bay	Whitefish Bay, WI

Head coach

- Maria Marchesano (Butler)

Assistant coach(es)

- Steven Asher (James Madison)
- Latrell Fleming (Wisconsin)
- Karen Stack (Northwestern)
- Quincy Cunningham (Maryland)
- Chelsey Perry (UT Martin)

Legend

- (C) Team captain
- (S) Suspended
- (I) Ineligible
- (W) Walk-on
- Injured
- Current redshirt

Roster
Last update: September 4, 2026
