= 2021 Northeast Conference women's basketball tournament =

American college basketball tournament

- Classification: Division I
- Season: 2020–21
- Teams: 9
- Site: Campus sites
- Champions: Mount St. Mary's (4th title)
- Winning coach: Maria Marchesano (1st title)
- MVP: Rebecca Lee (Mount St. Mary's)
- Television: ESPN3, ESPNU

2020–21 Northeast Conference women's basketball standings
	Conf.				Overall
Team	W		L	PCT	W		L	PCT
Mount St. Mary's†	14	–	4	.778	17	–	7	.708
Wagner	12	–	4	.750	13	–	6	.684
Saint Francis (PA)	12	–	4	.750	14	–	9	.609
Fairleigh Dickinson	12	–	6	.667	16	–	8	.667
Sacred Heart	8	–	8	.500	8	–	10	.444
LIU	7	–	11	.389	7	–	11	.389
Merrimack*	5	–	10	.333	5	–	10	.333
Bryant	5	–	12	.294	7	–	14	.333
St. Francis Brooklyn	4	–	10	.286	4	–	10	.286
Central Connecticut	4	–	14	.222	4	–	14	.222
† 2021 NEC tournament winner * ineligible for the 2021 NCAA tournament due to transition period St. Francis Brooklyn suspended their season on February 23, 2021; As of July 7, 2024; Rankings from AP poll

The 2021 Northeast Conference women's basketball tournament was the postseason women's basketball tournament for the 2020–21 season in the Northeast Conference. The tournament was held March 10–14, 2021. The tournament winner received an automatic invitation to the 2021 NCAA Division I women's basketball tournament. Mount St. Mary's won the conference tournament championship game over Wagner, 70–38.

== Seeds ==
Due to complications caused by the COVID-19 pandemic, only the top four teams in the Northeast Conference were eligible to compete in the conference tournament. Teams were seeded by record within the conference, with a tiebreaker system to seed teams with identical conference records.

Seed	School	Conference	Tiebreaker 1
1	Mount St. Mary's	14–4	
2	Wagner	12–4	1–0 vs. Saint Francis (PA)
3	Saint Francis (PA)	12–4	0–1 vs. Wagner
4	Fairleigh Dickinson	12–6	

== Schedule ==
Game	Time*	Matchup^{#}	Score	Television
Semifinals – Wednesday, March 10, 2021
1	7:00 p.m.	No. 4 Fairleigh Dickinson at. No. 1 Mount St. Mary's	62-77	ESPN3
2	7:00 p.m.	No. 3 Saint Francis (PA) at No. 2 Wagner	57-70	ESPN3
Championship – Sunday, March 14, 2021
3	2:00 p.m.	No. 2 Wagner at No. 1 Mount St. Mary's	38-70	ESPNU
*All times Eastern. ^{#}Rankings denote tournament seeding.

== Bracket ==
Semifinals; Wednesday, March 10, 2021
4	Fairleigh Dickinson	62
1	Mount St. Mary's	77
3	Saint Francis (PA)	57
2	Wagner	70

Championship; Sunday, March 14, 2021
2	Wagner	38
1	Mount St. Mary's	70

== See also ==
- 2021 Northeast Conference men's basketball tournament
- Northeast Conference women's basketball tournament
