= Beth Couture =

American basketball player and coach

Biographical details
- Born: July 27, 1962 (age 64)
- Education: Erskine College, A.B., 1984; Furman University, M.A., 1987

Playing career
- 1980–1984: Erskine

Coaching career (HC unless noted)

Women's volleyball
- 1987–1994: Presbyterian

Women's basketball
- 1987–1989: Presbyterian (assistant)
- 1989–2002: Presbyterian
- 2002–2014: Butler
- 2014–2015: Converse
- 2015–2016: Cleveland State (assistant)
- 2016–2018: Purdue (assistant)
- 2019–2023: Purdue (associate)

Administrative career (AD unless noted)
- 1993–2002: Presbyterian (assistant)

Head coaching record
- Overall: 406–244 (women's basketball); 233–50 (women's volleyball)
- Tournaments: 1–5 (WNIT); 2–6 (NCAA Division II women's basketball); 0–1 (NCAA Division II volleyball)

Accomplishments and honors

Championships
- 3 – SAC women's basketball regular season (1998, 1999, 2000); 4 – SAC women's basketball tournament (1995, 1998, 1999, 2000); 1 – SAC volleyball regular season (1990); 2 – SAC volleyball tournament (1992, 1993)

Awards
- 2010 Butler University Woman of Distinction; 3 – SAC Volleyball Coach of the Year (1990, 1991, 1992); 4 – SAC Women's Basketball Coach of the Year (1994, 1997, 1999, 2000); 4 – Erskine Women's Basketball MVP (1981, 1982, 1983, 1984); 1984 Kodak All-American; Erskine College Hall of Fame

Beth Couture (born July 27, 1962) is an American women's college basketball coach who was the head women's basketball coach at Butler University. From her first season at Butler in 2002–2003 through the 2011–2012 season, she compiled a 161–144 record including three consecutive WNIT appearances and four consecutive 20-win seasons, including a 23–10 mark in 2010, the most wins in team history. In 2007, Couture's contract at Butler was extended through the 2011–12 season.

== Coaching history ==
Beth Couture began coaching on the collegiate level when she became the head volleyball coach at Presbyterian College in 1987. Between 1987 and 1994, she obtained a record of 233–50, was named SAC Volleyball coach of the year three times, and guided the Blue Hose volleyball team to three national tournaments, including the school's first-ever NCAA postseason appearance in 1993.

In addition to volleyball, Couture coached women's basketball on the collegiate level beginning in 1987, spending two seasons as an assistant at Presbyterian College from 1987 to 1989, arriving after three years at as the head coach at Dixie High School in Due West, South Carolina, where she posted a 49–28 record. She was first named head coach for the 1989–90 season at Presbyterian. After thirteen seasons, Couture compiled a 258–117 (.688) overall record, including eight 20-win seasons. In addition, she led the program to the NCAA Division II national tournament six times in her final nine years. Further, Couture served as an assistant director of athletics from 1993 to 2002, until taking her position at Butler.

Couture also held the Beth Couture Basketball Camp each summer at Butler University.

== Personal life and education ==
Originally from Greenville, SC, Couture was a four-time women's basketball MVP at Erskine College, where she graduated in 1984. She was also selected as a Kodak All-American honoree as a senior and was inducted into the Erskine College Hall of Fame in December 1989. After earning her bachelor's degree in Physical Education at Erskine, Couture earned her master's degree in the same field at Furman University in 1987.

During Butler's most successful women's basketball season to date in 2009–10, Couture battled breast cancer, eventually entering radiation therapy following a mastectomy after undergoing chemotherapy. She was diagnosed with stage 2 breast cancer in April 2009. Since entering remission in 2010, Couture is one of the Indianapolis community's leaders in the fight against the disease, participating in several breast cancer awareness events. She walked 38 miles over a two-day span for St. Vincent's Weekend to End Breast Cancer, was the 2011 honorary chairwoman for the St. Vincent Woman of Hope group, and was named a 2010 Woman of Distinction by Butler University. During the men's NCAA Final Four in 2010, she and Butler Men's Basketball Coach Brad Stevens attended the annual Coaches vs. Cancer dinner together. In September 2010, Couture and the Butler women's basketball team raised $7,145 for breast cancer research and Couture walked 38 miles over a two-day span as part of Saint Vincent's Weekend to End Breast Cancer. In addition, the women's basketball team has worn pink uniforms to raise breast cancer awareness.

== Head coaching record ==
=== Women's basketball ===
Record table
Season	Team	Overall	Conference	Standing	Postseason
Presbyterian Blue Hose (South Atlantic Conference) (1989–2002)
1989–90	Presbyterian	20–10	8–6	3	
1990–91	Presbyterian	13–14	6–8	T–4	
1991–92	Presbyterian	16–11	7–7	T–4	
1992–93	Presbyterian	16–10	7–7	4	
1993–94	Presbyterian	22–8	9–4	2	NCAA D-II Second Round
1994–95	Presbyterian	23–7	11–3	3	NCAA D-II First Round
1995–96	Presbyterian	13–14	6–8	T–5	
1996–97	Presbyterian	17–10	8–6	T–3	
1997–98	Presbyterian	23–8	11–3	T–1	NCAA D-II Region Semifinals
1998–99	Presbyterian	24–6	11–3	T–1	NCAA D-II First Round
1999–00	Presbyterian	28–2	15–1	1	NCAA D-II Region Semifinals
2000–01	Presbyterian	22–8	11–3	T–2	
2001–02	Presbyterian	21–9	10–4	T–2	NCAA D-II First Round
Presbyterian:		258–117	120–63		
Butler Bulldogs (Horizon League) (2002–2012)
2002–03	Butler	6–23	3–13	T–8	
2003–04	Butler	14–15	9–7	T–4	
2004–05	Butler	14–14	8–8	5	
2005–06	Butler	15–14	9–7	4	
2006–07	Butler	16–15	11–5	T–2	
2007–08	Butler	20–10	10–8	T–4	
2008–09	Butler	20–12	14–4	2	WNIT Second Round
2009–10	Butler	23–10	14–4	T–2	WNIT
2010–11	Butler	20–14	12–6	T–2	WNIT
2011–12	Butler	13–17	9–9	5	
Horizon League:			99–71		
Butler Bulldogs (Atlantic 10) (2012–2013)
2012–13	Butler	17–14	8–6	6	WNIT
Atlantic 10:			8–6		
Butler Bulldogs (Big East) (2013–2014)
2013–14	Butler	15–16	10–8	6th	WNIT
Big East:			10–8		
Butler:		193–174	117–85		
Total:		456–291			
National champion Postseason invitational champion Conference regular season champion Conference regular season and conference tournament champion Division regular season champion Division regular season and conference tournament champion Conference tournament champion

=== Women's volleyball ===
Record table
Season	Team	Overall	Conference	Standing	Postseason
Presbyterian Blue Hose (South Atlantic Conference) (1987–1993)
1987	Presbyterian	40–5			
1988	Presbyterian	27–10			
1989	Presbyterian	30–8	12–2	2	
1990	Presbyterian	28–8	7–0	1	
1991	Presbyterian	42–4	7–0	1*	
1992	Presbyterian	33–7	6–1	2	
1993	Presbyterian	33–8	6–1	2	NCAA Division II First Round
Presbyterian:		233–50 (.823)			
Total:		233–50 (.823)			
National champion Postseason invitational champion Conference regular season champion Conference regular season and conference tournament champion Division regular season champion Division regular season and conference tournament champion Conference tournament champion
