= Purdue Fort Wayne Mastodons women's basketball =

Purdue Fort Wayne Mastodons
2026–27 Purdue Fort Wayne Mastodons women's basketball team
- University: Purdue University Fort Wayne
- First season: 1976–77
- Head coach: Kate Peterson Abiad (1st season)
- Location: Fort Wayne, Indiana
- Arena: Hilliard Gates Sports Center; Allen County War Memorial Coliseum (select games) (capacity: 2,700 (Hilliard); 13,000 (Coliseum))
- Conference: Horizon League
- Nickname: Mastodons
- Colors: Black and gold
- Student section: The Herd

NCAA Division II tournament appearances
- 1990, 1992, 1996

Uniforms
Home	Away

The Purdue Fort Wayne Mastodons women's basketball team represents Purdue University Fort Wayne in Fort Wayne, Indiana. The school's team currently competes in the Horizon League.

Fort Wayne began play in women's basketball in 1976. As of the end of the 2015–16 season, they have an all-time record of 433–568. They joined Division I in 2001.

== Postseason ==
=== NCAA Division II tournament results ===
The Mastodons made three appearances in the NCAA Division II women's basketball tournament. They had a combined record of 0–3.

Year	Round	Opponent	Result
1990	First Round	Oakland	L 83–87
1992	First Round	Washburn	L 67–82
1996	First Round	Lake Superior State	L 71–79
