= 2020–21 Vanderbilt Commodores women's basketball team =

Intercollegiate basketball season

2020–1921 Vanderbilt Commodores women's basketball
- Conference: Southeastern Conference
- Record: 4–4 (0–3 SEC)
- Head coach: Stephanie White (5th season)
- Assistant coaches: Kelly Komara; Gary Redus II; Marqu'es Webb
- Home arena: Memorial Gymnasium

2020–21 SEC women's basketball standings
	Conf.				Overall
Team	W		L	PCT	W		L	PCT
No. 4 Texas A&M	13	–	1	.929	25	–	3	.893
No. 6 South Carolina †	14	–	2	.875	26	–	5	.839
No. 13 Tennessee	9	–	4	.692	17	–	8	.680
No. 10 Georgia	10	–	5	.667	20	–	6	.769
No. 15 Arkansas	9	–	6	.600	19	–	8	.704
No. 18 Kentucky	9	–	6	.600	18	–	8	.692
Alabama	8	–	8	.500	16	–	9	.640
LSU	6	–	8	.429	9	–	13	.409
Mississippi State	5	–	7	.417	10	–	9	.526
Missouri	5	–	9	.357	9	–	13	.409
Ole Miss	4	–	10	.286	15	–	12	.556
Florida	3	–	11	.214	12	–	14	.462
Auburn	0	–	15	.000	5	–	19	.208
Vanderbilt^{%}	0	–	3	.000	4	–	4	.500
† 2021 SEC tournament winner % Vanderbilt suspended their season on January 18, 2021; As of March 21, 2021; Rankings from AP poll

The 2020–21 Vanderbilt Commodores women's basketball team represented Vanderbilt University during the 2020–21 NCAA Division I women's basketball season. The Commodores, led by fifth-year head coach Stephanie White, played their home games at Memorial Gymnasium and competed as members of the Southeastern Conference (SEC).

On January 18, 2021, it was announced that the team would end their season due to COVID-19 concerns, injuries and a depleted roster. In March, following three student transfer requests, Vanderbilt fired White.

== Roster ==
2020–21 Vanderbilt Commodores women's basketball team
Players
Coaches

Pos.	#	Name	Height	Year	Previous school	Hometown
G	0	Bella LaChance	5 ft 6 in (1.68 m)	Fr	St. Thomas Aquinas HS	Davie, FL
G	1	Enna Pehadzik	5 ft 9 in (1.75 m)	RS Sr	Horsens Statsskole	Horsens, Denmark
G	2	Chelsie Hall	5 ft 7 in (1.7 m)	Sr	Seffner Christian	Boca Raton, FL
G	3	Jordyn Cambridge	5 ft 9 in (1.75 m)	Jr	Ensworth	Nashville, TN
F	5	Yaubryon Chambers	6 ft 1 in (1.85 m)	So	Providence Christian	Murfreesboro, TN
G	12	Demi Washington	5 ft 10 in (1.78 m)	So	New Hope	Wake Forest, NC
G	15	Brinae Alexander	5 ft 9 in (1.75 m)	Jr	Riverdale HS	Murfreesboro, TN
G	22	Brylee Bartrum	5 ft 8 in (1.73 m)	So	Seffner Christian	Tampa, FL
F	23	Koi Love	6 ft 0 in (1.83 m)	So	Miami Country	Orlando, FL
F	24	Autumn Newby	6 ft 2 in (1.88 m)	Sr	Archer HS	Lawrenceville, GA
F	25	Kyndall Golden	6 ft 3 in (1.91 m)	So	New Manchester HS	Atlanta, GA
G	33	Kiara Pearl	5 ft 8 in (1.73 m)	So	Eastern HS	Louisville, KY
C	44	Emily Bowman	6 ft 6 in (1.98 m)	Fr	Huntsville HS	Huntsville, AL
F	50	Kaylon Smith	5 ft 10 in (1.78 m)	So	Oxbridge	West Palm Beach, FL

Head coach

- Stephanie White (Purdue)

Assistant coach(es)

- Kelly Komara (Purdue)
- Gary Redus II (South Alabama)
- Marqu'es Webb (Vanderbilt)

Legend

- (C) Team captain
- (S) Suspended
- (I) Ineligible
- (W) Walk-on
- Injured
- Current redshirt

Roster
Last update: September 2, 2024

== Preseason ==
=== SEC media poll ===
The SEC media poll was released on November 17, 2020.

Media poll
Predicted finish	Team
1	South Carolina
2	Kentucky
3	Texas A&M
4	Arkansas
5	Mississippi State
6	Tennessee
7	LSU
8	Alabama
9	Georgia
10	Missouri
11	Ole Miss
12	Florida
13	Vanderbilt
14	Auburn

== Schedule ==
Date time, TV	Rank^{#}	Opponent^{#}	Result	Record	High points	High rebounds	High assists	Site (attendance) city, state
Non-conference regular season
November 29, 2020; 2:00 p.m.		at Middle Tennessee						Murphy Center; Murfreesboro, TN
December 2, 2020; 7:00 p.m., SECN+		Texas Tech; Big 12/SEC Women's Challenge						Memorial Gymnasium; Nashville, TN
December 5, 2020; 2:00 p.m.		at Little Rock	L 74–82	0–1	24 – Love	10 – Love	3 – tied	Jack Stephens Center (353); Little Rock, AR
December 8, 2020; 7:00 p.m., SECN+		East Tennessee State	W 81–61	1–1	25 – Pehadzic	12 – Love	5 – Pehadzic	Memorial Gymnasium (0); Nashville, TN
December 13, 2020; 1:00 p.m., ESPN+		at Chattanooga	W 80–78	2–1	21 – Love	16 – Love	3 – tied	McKenzie Arena (0); Chattanooga, TN
December 17, 2020; 2:00 p.m., SECN+		VCU	W 90–81	3–1	29 – Love	9 – Alexander	9 – Hall	Memorial Gymnasium (46); Nashville, TN
December 20, 2020; 2:00 p.m., SECN+		Gardner–Webb	W 97–58	4–1	23 – Bartram	13 – Love	6 – tied	Memorial Gymnasium (84); Nashville, TN
December 28, 2020; 7:00 p.m., SECN+		Samford						Memorial Gymnasium; Nashville, TN
SEC regular season
January 3, 2021; 2:00 p.m., SECN		at No. 12 Mississippi State						Humphrey Coliseum; Starkville, MS
January 7, 2021; 7:00 p.m., SECN+		at Missouri						Mizzou Arena; Columbia, MO
January 10, 2021; 1:00 p.m., SECN		Alabama	L 56–80	4–2 (0–1)	15 – Bartram	8 – Chambers	2 – tied	Memorial Gymnasium (55); Nashville, TN
January 14, 2021; 7:00 p.m., SECN+		No. 5 South Carolina	L 43–106	4–3 (0–2)	18 – Love	9 – Love	1 – tied	Memorial Gymnasium; Nashville, TN
January 17, 2021; 4:00 p.m., SECN		at No. 12 Kentucky	L 73–80	4–4 (0–3)	32 – Love	9 – Chambers	2 – tied	Memorial Coliseum; Lexington, KY
January 21, 2020; Noon, SECN		Florida	Season canceled					Memorial Gymnasium; Nashville, TN
January 24, 2021; 2:00 p.m., SECN		No. 25 Tennessee	Season canceled					Memorial Gymnasium; Nashville, TN
January 28, 2021		at Arkansas	Season canceled					Bud Walton Arena; Fayetteville, AR
February 1, 2021; 6:00 p.m., SECN		Mississippi State	Season canceled					Memorial Gymnasium; Nashville, TN
February 4, 2021; 5:00 p.m., SECN+		at Florida	Season canceled					O'Connell Center; Gainesville, FL
February 11, 2021; 7:00 p.m., SECN+		Texas A&M	Season canceled					Memorial Gymnasium; Nashville, TN
February 14, 2021; 1:00 p.m., SECN		at Tennessee	Season canceled					Thompson–Boling Arena; Knoxville, TN
February 18, 2021; 7:00 p.m., SECN+		Georgia	Season canceled					Memorial Gymnasium; Nashville, TN
February 21, 2021; 2:00 p.m.		at Auburn	Season canceled					Auburn Arena; Auburn, AL
February 25, 2021		at Ole Miss	Season canceled					The Pavilion at Ole Miss; Oxford, MS
February 28, 2021; 5:00 p.m., SECN		LSU	Season canceled					Memorial Gymnasium; Nashville, TN
*Non-conference game. ^{#}Rankings from AP poll. (#) Tournament seedings in parentheses. All times are in Central.
