= 2020–21 Kentucky Wildcats women's basketball team =

Intercollegiate basketball season

2020–21 Kentucky Wildcats women's basketball

NCAA tournament, Second round
- Conference: Southeastern Conference

Ranking
- Coaches: No. 17
- AP: No. 18
- Record: 18–9 (9–6 SEC)
- Head coach: Kyra Elzy (1st season)
- Assistant coaches: Niya Butts; Amber Smith; Lin Dunn
- Home arena: Memorial Coliseum; Rupp Arena

2020–21 SEC women's basketball standings
	Conf.				Overall
Team	W		L	PCT	W		L	PCT
No. 4 Texas A&M	13	–	1	.929	25	–	3	.893
No. 6 South Carolina †	14	–	2	.875	26	–	5	.839
No. 13 Tennessee	9	–	4	.692	17	–	8	.680
No. 10 Georgia	10	–	5	.667	20	–	6	.769
No. 15 Arkansas	9	–	6	.600	19	–	8	.704
No. 18 Kentucky	9	–	6	.600	18	–	8	.692
Alabama	8	–	8	.500	16	–	9	.640
LSU	6	–	8	.429	9	–	13	.409
Mississippi State	5	–	7	.417	10	–	9	.526
Missouri	5	–	9	.357	9	–	13	.409
Ole Miss	4	–	10	.286	15	–	12	.556
Florida	3	–	11	.214	12	–	14	.462
Auburn	0	–	15	.000	5	–	19	.208
Vanderbilt^{%}	0	–	3	.000	4	–	4	.500
† 2021 SEC tournament winner % Vanderbilt suspended their season on January 18, 2021; As of March 21, 2021; Rankings from AP poll

The 2020–21 Kentucky Wildcats women's basketball team represented the University of Kentucky during the 2020–21 NCAA Division I women's basketball season. The Wildcats, led by head coach Kyra Elzy, played their home games at Memorial Coliseum and Rupp Arena and competed as members of the Southeastern Conference (SEC).

== Roster ==
2020–21 Kentucky Wildcats women's basketball team
Players
Coaches

Pos.	#	Name	Height	Year	Previous school	Hometown
C	00	Olivia Owens	6 ft 4 in (1.93 m)	RS So	Niskayuna; Maryland	Albany, NY
G	1	Robyn Benton	5 ft 9 in (1.75 m)	Jr	Greater Atlanta Christian; Auburn	Atlanta, GA
F	3	KeKe McKinney	6 ft 1 in (1.85 m)	Sr	Fulton (TN)	Knoxville, TN
G	5	Blair Green	6 ft 0 in (1.83 m)	Jr	Harlan County	Harlan, KY
G	10	Rhyne Howard	6 ft 2 in (1.88 m)	Jr	Bradley Central	Cleveland, TN
G	12	Treasure Hunt	6 ft 2 in (1.88 m)	Fr	Hamilton Heights Christian	Chattanooga, TN
G	13	Jazmine Massengill	6 ft 0 in (1.83 m)	Jr	Hamilton Heights Christian; Tennessee	Chattanooga, TN
F	14	Tatyana Wyatt	6 ft 2 in (1.88 m)	Sr	Columbus	Columbus, GA
G	15	Chasity Patterson	5 ft 5 in (1.65 m)	Sr	North Shore; Texas	Houston, TX
G	20	Erin Toller	5 ft 7 in (1.7 m)	Fr	Sacred Heart Academy	Louisville, KY
F	21	Nyah Leveretter	6 ft 3 in (1.91 m)	Fr	Westwood	Blythewood, SC
G	23	Kameron Roach	5 ft 6 in (1.68 m)	RS Jr	Lower Richland	Hopkins, SC
G	34	Emma King	5 ft 10 in (1.78 m)	So	Lincoln County	Stanford, KY
F	44	Dre'una Edwards	6 ft 2 in (1.88 m)	RS So	Liberty HS; Utah	Las Vegas, NV

Head coach

- Kyra Elzy (Tennessee)

Assistant coach(es)

- Niya Butts (Tennessee)
- Amber Smith (Kentucky)
- Lin Dunn (UT Martin)

Legend

- (C) Team captain
- (S) Suspended
- (I) Ineligible
- (W) Walk-on
- Injured
- Current redshirt

Roster
Last update: November 19, 2020

== Preseason ==
=== SEC media poll ===
The SEC media poll was released on November 17, 2020.

Media poll
Predicted finish	Team
1	South Carolina
2	Kentucky
3	Texas A&M
4	Arkansas
5	Mississippi State
6	Tennessee
7	LSU
8	Alabama
9	Georgia
10	Missouri
11	Ole Miss
12	Florida
13	Vanderbilt
14	Auburn

== Rankings ==
Ranking movements Legend: ██ Increase in ranking ██ Decrease in ranking
	Week																				
Poll	Pre	1	2	3	4	5	6	7	8	9	10	11	12	13	14	15	16	17	18	19	Final
AP	11	11	9	9	13	13	10	10	12	12	15	20	17	19	17	18					
Coaches	12	12																			

^Coaches' Poll did not release a second poll at the same time as the AP.

== Schedule ==
Date time, TV	Rank^{#}	Opponent^{#}	Result	Record	High points	High rebounds	High assists	Site (attendance) city, state
Non-conference regular season
November 25, 2020*; 1:00 pm, SEC+	No. 11	Murray State	W 86–60	1–0	30 – Patterson	9 – Owens	3 – Tied	Memorial Coliseum (1,200); Lexington, KY
November 29, 2020*; 2:00 pm, SECN	No. 11	Belmont	W 70–50	2–0	27 – Edwards	15 – Edwards	4 – Benton	Memorial Coliseum (1,200); Lexington, KY
December 3, 2020*; 7:30 pm	No. 11	at Kansas State; Big 12/SEC Women's Challenge	W 60–49	3–0	16 – Edwards	12 – Edwards	5 – Tied	Bramlage Coliseum (502); Manhattan, KS
December 6, 2020*; 4:00 pm, ESPNU	No. 11	No. 13 Indiana; Rivalry	W 72–68	4–0	22 – Howard	9 – Edwards	6 – Patterson	Memorial Coliseum (1,200); Lexington, KY
December 9, 2020*; 7:00 pm, SECN+	No. 9	Marshall	W 79–45	5–0	17 – Green	8 – Tied	5 – Tied	Memorial Coliseum (1,200); Lexington, KY
December 13, 2020*; 2:00 pm	No. 9	Samford	W 88–54	6–0	16 – Patterson	7 – Howard	6 – Howard	Memorial Coliseum (1,200); Lexington, KY
December 16, 2020*; 3:00 pm	No. 9	at No. 24 DePaul	L 82–86	6–1	22 – Patterson	12 – Howard	5 – Edwards	Wintrust Arena; Chicago, IL
December 19, 2020*; 2:00 pm, SEC+	No. 9	Wofford	W 98–37	7–1	19 – Edwards	9 – Tied	4 – Tied	Memorial Coliseum (1,200); Lexington, KY
SEC regular season
December 31, 2020; 8:30 pm, SECN	No. 13	No. 10 Arkansas	W 75–64	8–1 (1–0)	24 – Howard	10 – Howard	4 – Tied	Memorial Coliseum (1,200); Lexington, KY
January 3, 2021; 1:00 pm, ESPN2	No. 13	at No. 12 Mississippi State	W 92–86 ^{OT}	9–1 (2–0)	33 – Howard	11 – Edwards	6 – Howard	Humphrey Coliseum (1,000); Starkville, MS
January 7, 2021; 8:30 pm, SECN	No. 10	at No. 8 Texas A&M	L 60–77	9–2 (2–1)	22 – Howard	6 – Howard	5 – Howard	Reed Arena (824); College Station, TX
January 10, 2021; Noon, ESPN2	No. 10	No. 5 South Carolina	L 70–75	9–3 (2–2)	32 – Howard	7 – Tied	4 – Patterson	Memorial Coliseum (1,200); Lexington, KY
January 17, 2021; 5:00 pm, SECN	No. 12	Vanderbilt	W 80–73	10–3 (3–2)	22 – Green	8 – Edwards	7 – Patterson	Memorial Coliseum (1,200); Lexington, KY
January 21, 2021; 8:30 pm, SECN	No. 12	at Auburn	W 76–71	11–3 (4–2)	18 – Green	8 – McKinney	4 – McKinney	Auburn Arena (578); Auburn, AL
January 24, 2021; 2:00 pm, ESPN2	No. 12	at No. 25 Tennessee; Rivalry	L 53–70	11–4 (4–3)	15 – Patterson	5 – Owens	4 – Patterson	Thompson–Boling Arena (2,609); Knoxville, TN
January 28, 2021; 6:30 pm, SECN	No. 15	Alabama	W 81–68	12–4 (5–3)	16 – Howard	8 – Howard	7 – Tied	Memorial Coliseum (1,533); Lexington, KY
January 31, 2021; 1:00 pm, SECN	No. 15	Missouri	W 61–55	13–4 (6–3)	22 – Howard	10 – Howard	3 – Howard	Memorial Coliseum (1,200); Lexington, KY
February 4, 2021; 7:00 pm, SECN+	No. 15	at Ole Miss	L 60–72	13–5 (6–4)	26 – Howard	10 – Howard	4 – Howard	The Pavilion at Ole Miss (844); Oxford, MS
February 11, 2021; 7:00 pm, SECN+	No. 20	No. 16 Tennessee; Rivalry	W 71–56	14–5 (7–4)	21 – Patterson	7 – Tied	6 – Howard	Memorial Coliseum (1,683); Lexington, KY
February 15, 2021; 7:00 pm, SECN	No. 17	at Florida	W 88–80	15–5 (8–4)	31 – Howard	9 – Howard	6 – Rickards	O'Connell Center (659); Gainesville, FL
February 19, 2021; 2:00 pm, SECN+	No. 17	LSU	Postponed due to weather concerns.					Memorial Coliseum; Lexington, KY
February 21, 2021; 3:00 pm, ESPN	No. 17	at No. 2 South Carolina	L 55–76	15–6 (8–5)	12 – Howard	6 – Howard	5 – Massengill	Colonial Life Arena; Columbia, SC
February 25, 2021; 7:00 pm, SECN+	No. 19	at No. 17 Georgia	W 62–58	16–6 (9–5)	27 – Howard	6 – Wyatt	5 – Massengill	Stegeman Coliseum; Athens, GA
February 28, 2021; Noon, SECN	No. 19	Ole Miss	L 69–73	16–7 (9–6)	21 – Howard	16 – Howard	5 – Howard	Memorial Coliseum; Lexington, KY
SEC Tournament
March 4, 2021; 1:30 pm, SECN	(5) No. 17	vs. (12) Florida; Second Round	W 73–64	17–7	27 – Howard	8 – McKinney	4 – Tied	Bon Secours Wellness Arena; Greenville, SC
March 5, 2021; 1:30 pm, SECN	(5) No. 17	vs. (4) No. 16 Georgia; Quarterfinals	L 66–78	17–8	33 – Howard	9 – McKinney	4 – Massengill	Bon Secours Wellness Arena; Greenville, SC
NCAA tournament
March 21, 2021; 2:00 pm, ESPN	(4 RW) No. 18	vs. (13 RW) Idaho State; First Round	W 71-63	18-8	14 – Howard	9 – Howard	5 – Tied	Alamodome; San Antonio, TX
*Non-conference game. ^{#}Rankings from AP Poll. (#) Tournament seedings in parentheses. All times are in Eastern Time.
