= 2020–21 Auburn Tigers women's basketball team =

Intercollegiate basketball season

2020–21 Auburn Tigers women's basketball
- Conference: Southeastern Conference
- Record: 5–19 (0–15 SEC)
- Head coach: Terri Williams-Flournoy (9th season)
- Assistant coaches: Clarisse Garcia; La'Keshia Frett Meredith
- Home arena: Auburn Arena

2020–21 SEC women's basketball standings
	Conf.				Overall
Team	W		L	PCT	W		L	PCT
No. 4 Texas A&M	13	–	1	.929	25	–	3	.893
No. 6 South Carolina †	14	–	2	.875	26	–	5	.839
No. 13 Tennessee	9	–	4	.692	17	–	8	.680
No. 10 Georgia	10	–	5	.667	20	–	6	.769
No. 15 Arkansas	9	–	6	.600	19	–	8	.704
No. 18 Kentucky	9	–	6	.600	18	–	8	.692
Alabama	8	–	8	.500	16	–	9	.640
LSU	6	–	8	.429	9	–	13	.409
Mississippi State	5	–	7	.417	10	–	9	.526
Missouri	5	–	9	.357	9	–	13	.409
Ole Miss	4	–	10	.286	15	–	12	.556
Florida	3	–	11	.214	12	–	14	.462
Auburn	0	–	15	.000	5	–	19	.208
Vanderbilt^{%}	0	–	3	.000	4	–	4	.500
† 2021 SEC tournament winner % Vanderbilt suspended their season on January 18, 2021; As of March 21, 2021; Rankings from AP poll

The 2020–21 Auburn Tigers women's basketball team represented Auburn University during the 2020–21 NCAA Division I women's basketball season. The Tigers, led by ninth-year head coach Terri Williams-Flournoy, played their home games at Auburn Arena and competed as members of the Southeastern Conference (SEC). They finished the season 5–19 (0–15 SEC) with a loss to Florida in the first round of the SEC tournament. On March 4, 2021, following a winless SEC season, Williams-Flournoy was fired as head coach.

== Preseason ==
=== SEC media poll ===
The SEC media poll was released on November 17, 2020 with the Tigers selected to finish in last place in the SEC.

Media poll
Predicted finish	Team
1	South Carolina
2	Kentucky
3	Texas A&M
4	Arkansas
5	Mississippi State
6	Tennessee
7	LSU
8	Alabama
9	Georgia
10	Missouri
11	Ole Miss
12	Florida
13	Vanderbilt
14	Auburn

=== Preseason All-SEC teams ===
The Tigers had one player selected to the preseason all-SEC teams.

First team

Unique Thompson

== Schedule ==
Date time, TV	Rank^{#}	Opponent^{#}	Result	Record	High points	High rebounds	High assists	Site (attendance) city, state
Non-conference regular season
November 25, 2020*; 6:00 pm, SECN+		USC Upstate	W 82–41	1–0	16 – Tied	7 – Thompson	5 – Rice	Auburn Arena (588); Auburn, AL
November 28, 2020*; Noon, SECN+		Samford	W 66–64	2–0	16 – Thompson	11 – Thompson	4 – Lowery	Auburn Arena (540); Auburn, AL
December 1, 2020*; 6:00 pm, SECN+		Gardner–Webb	W 97–61	3–0	21 – Thompson	12 – Thompson	4 – Jordan	Auburn Arena (487); Auburn, AL
December 5, 2020*; Noon, ESPN+		at Houston	L 61–71	3–1	26 – Thompson	23 – Thompson	2 – Tied	Fertitta Center (509); Houston, TX
December 13, 2020*; 3:00 pm, SECN		South Alabama	W 74–66	4–1	21 – Thompson	14 – Thompson	3 – Tied	Auburn Arena (520); Auburn, AL
December 16, 2020*; 6:00 pm, SECN+		Stephen F. Austin	L 54–67	4–2	16 – Scott-Grayson	14 – Thompson	2 – Scott-Grayson	Auburn Arena (445); Auburn, AL
December 17, 2020*; 6:00 pm, SECN+		North Florida	W 94–81	5–2	19 – Thompson	18 – Thompson	5 – Lowery	Auburn Arena (449); Auburn, AL
December 20, 2020*; 2:00 pm, SECN+		Belmont	L 57–78	5–3	20 – Thompson	23 – Thompson	4 – Scott-Grayson	Auburn Arena (515); Auburn, AL
SEC regular season
December 31, 2020; 6:00 pm, SECN+		at LSU	L 43–56	5–4 (0–1)	12 – Coulibaly	11 – Levy	2 – Tied	Pete Maravich Assembly Center (687); Baton Rouge, LA
January 3, 2021; 2:00 pm, SECN		Georgia	L 44–76	5–5 (0–2)	12 – Patton	4 – Tied	1 – Tied	Auburn Arena (657); Auburn, AL
January 7, 2021; 6:00 pm, SECN+		at Ole Miss	L 58–62	5–6 (0–3)	23 – Scott-Grayson	5 – Scott-Grayson	6 – Robinson-Nwagwu	The Pavilion at Ole Miss (851); Oxford, MS
January 17, 2021; Noon, SECN		at Florida	L 54–68	5–7 (0–4)	18 – Scott-Grayson	14 – Thompson	4 – Thompson	O'Connell Center (702); Gainesville, FL
January 21, 2021; 7:30 pm, SECN		No. 12 Kentucky	L 71–76	5–8 (0–5)	22 – Thompson	10 – Thompson	7 – Levy	Auburn Arena (578); Auburn, AL
January 24, 2021; 1:00 pm, ESPNU		at Alabama	L 55–67	5–9 (0–6)	17 – Scott-Grayson	10 – Thompson	4 – Scott-Grayson	Coleman Coliseum (922); Tuscaloosa, AL
January 28, 2021; 7:30 pm, SECN		No. 8 Texas A&M	L 69–84	5–10 (0–7)	21 – Scott-Grayson	7 – Thompson	5 – Rice	Auburn Arena (578); Auburn, AL
January 31, 2021; 2:00 pm, SECN+		at No. 19 Arkansas	L 67–77	5–11 (0–8)	18 – Thompson	19 – Thompson	3 – Scott-Grayson	Bud Walton Arena (2,133); Fayetteville, AR
February 4, 2021; 6:00 pm, SECN+		No. 2 South Carolina	L 58–77	5–12 (0–9)	15 – Scott-Grayson	8 – Thompson	3 – Levy	Auburn Arena (608); Auburn, AL
February 7, 2021; Noon, SECN		Missouri	L 75–85	5–13 (0–10)	30 – Scott-Grayson	13 – Thompson	3 – Thompson	Auburn Arena (539); Auburn, AL
February 11, 2021; 6:00 pm, SECN+		at No. 24 Georgia	L 54–74	5–14 (0–11)	22 – Thompson	12 – Thompson	4 – Lowery	Stegeman Coliseum (835); Athens, GA
February 14, 2021; 5:00 pm, SECN		Alabama	L 78–92	5–15 (0–12)	25 – Scott-Grayson	6 – Thompson	9 – Rice	Auburn Arena (841); Auburn, AL
February 21, 2021; 2:00 pm, SECN+		Vanderbilt	Canceled due to Vanderbilt ending season					Auburn Arena; Auburn, AL
February 23, 2021; 5:00 pm, SECN		at Mississippi State	L 68–81	5–16 (0–13)	24 – Scott-Grayson	14 – Thompson	4 – Tied	Humphrey Coliseum (1,000); Starkville, MS
February 25, 2021; 8:00 pm, SECN		No. 16 Arkansas	L 69–74	5–17 (0–14)	22 – Thompson	18 – Thompson	3 – Thompson	Auburn Arena (528); Auburn, AL
February 28, 2021; 1:00 pm, SECN		at No. 20 Tennessee	L 54–88	5–18 (0–15)	11 – Rice	5 – Tied	4 – Rice	Thompson–Boling Arena (3,077); Knoxville, TN
SEC Tournament
March 3, 2021; 3:00 pm, SECN	(13)	vs. (12) Florida; First Round	L 62–69	5–19	15 – Rice	10 – Thompson	3 – Scott-Grayson	Bon Secours Wellness Arena; Greenville, SC
*Non-conference game. ^{#}Rankings from AP Poll. (#) Tournament seedings in parentheses. All times are in Central Time.
