= 2020–21 Texas A&M Aggies women's basketball team =

Intercollegiate basketball season

2020–21 Texas A&M Aggies women's basketball

SEC regular season champions

NCAA tournament, Sweet Sixteen
- Conference: Southeastern Conference

Ranking
- Coaches: No. 5
- AP: No. 4
- Record: 25-3 (13–1 SEC)
- Head coach: Gary Blair (18th season)
- Assistant coaches: Kelly Bond-White; Bob Starkey; Amy Wright
- Home arena: Reed Arena

2020–21 SEC women's basketball standings
	Conf.				Overall
Team	W		L	PCT	W		L	PCT
No. 4 Texas A&M	13	–	1	.929	25	–	3	.893
No. 6 South Carolina †	14	–	2	.875	26	–	5	.839
No. 13 Tennessee	9	–	4	.692	17	–	8	.680
No. 10 Georgia	10	–	5	.667	20	–	6	.769
No. 15 Arkansas	9	–	6	.600	19	–	8	.704
No. 18 Kentucky	9	–	6	.600	18	–	8	.692
Alabama	8	–	8	.500	16	–	9	.640
LSU	6	–	8	.429	9	–	13	.409
Mississippi State	5	–	7	.417	10	–	9	.526
Missouri	5	–	9	.357	9	–	13	.409
Ole Miss	4	–	10	.286	15	–	12	.556
Florida	3	–	11	.214	12	–	14	.462
Auburn	0	–	15	.000	5	–	19	.208
Vanderbilt^{%}	0	–	3	.000	4	–	4	.500
† 2021 SEC tournament winner % Vanderbilt suspended their season on January 18, 2021; As of March 21, 2021; Rankings from AP poll

The 2020–21 Texas A&M Aggies women's basketball team represented Texas A&M University in the 2020–21 NCAA Division I women's basketball season. The team were led by head coach Gary Blair, in his eighteenth season at Texas A&M. The team played their home games at the Reed Arena in College Station, Texas, and were in their ninth season as a member of the Southeastern Conference.

On February 28, the third-ranked Aggies defeated the fifth-ranked Gamecocks to win their first-ever SEC regular-season championship since joining the conference in 2013. The team received a double-bye to advance to the quarterfinals of the SEC tournament.

== Previous season ==
The Aggies finished the 2019–20 season with a record of 22–8 (10–6 SEC) and ranked 18th in the nation. They lost the SEC women's tournament quarterfinals round to Arkansas.

== Preseason ==
=== SEC media poll ===
The SEC media poll was released on November 17, 2020.

Media poll
Predicted finish	Team
1	South Carolina
2	Kentucky
3	Texas A&M
4	Arkansas
5	Mississippi State
6	Tennessee
7	LSU
8	Alabama
9	Georgia
10	Missouri
11	Ole Miss
12	Florida
13	Vanderbilt
14	Auburn

== Roster ==
2020–21 Texas A&M Aggies women's basketball team
Players
Coaches

Pos.	#	Name	Height	Year	Previous school	Hometown
C	0	Ella Tofaeono	6 ft 3 in (1.91 m)	Jr	Midland College	Sydney, AUS
G	1	Zaay Green	6 ft 0 in (1.83 m)	Jr	Tennessee	Duncanville, TX
G	2	Aaliyah Wilson	5 ft 11 in (1.8 m)	Sr	Muskogee	Muskogee, OK
G	3	Destiny Pitts	5 ft 10 in (1.78 m)	Jr	Minnesota	Detroit, MI
G	4	Kay Kay Green	5 ft 6 in (1.68 m)	Fr	Whitney M. Young Magnet HS	Chicago, IL
G	5	Jordan Nixon	5 ft 8 in (1.73 m)	RS Jr	The Mary Louis Academy; Notre Dame	New York City, NY
G	11	Kayla Wells	6 ft 0 in (1.83 m)	Sr	South Grand Prairie HS	Dallas, TX
F	14	Maliyah Johnson	6 ft 2 in (1.88 m)	Fr	Summer Creek HS	Chicago, IL
C	22	Kenyal Perry	5 ft 6 in (1.68 m)	Fr	McKinley HS	New Orleans, LA
G	23	McKinzie Green	5 ft 6 in (1.68 m)	So	Manvel HS	Manvel, TX
G	24	Sahara Jones	6 ft 0 in (1.83 m)	Fr	Veterans Memorial HS	San Antonio, TX
F	31	N'dea Jones	6 ft 2 in (1.88 m)	Sr	Brookwood	Lawrenceville, GA
C	33	Anna Dreimane	6 ft 5 in (1.96 m)	Sr	Riga State Gymnasium No. 2	Riga, Latvia
C	40	Ciera Johnson	6 ft 4 in (1.93 m)	Sr	Duncanville	Duncanville, TX
G	45	Alexis Morris	5 ft 6 in (1.68 m)	Jr	Rutgers	Beaumont, TX

Head coach

- Gary Blair (Texas Tech)

Assistant coach(es)

- Kelly Bond-White (Illinois)
- Bob Starkey (LSU)
- Amy Wright (Arkansas)

Legend

- (C) Team captain
- (S) Suspended
- (I) Ineligible
- (W) Walk-on
- Injured
- Current redshirt

Roster
Last update: November 20, 2020

== Rankings ==
Ranking movements Legend: ██ Increase in ranking ██ Decrease in ranking
	Week																				
Poll	Pre	1	2	3	4	5	6	7	8	9	10	11	12	13	14	15	16	17	18	19	Final
AP	13	13	12	10	10	9	9	8	7	8	7	6	5	3	2	4					
Coaches	13	13	10	10	9	9	7	7	8	7	5	5									

^Coaches' Poll did not release a second poll at the same time as the AP.

== Schedule ==
Date time, TV	Rank^{#}	Opponent^{#}	Result	Record	Site (attendance) city, state
Non-conference season
11/25/2020; Noon, SECN+	No. 13	Lamar	W 77–61	1–0	Reed Arena; College Station, TX
11/28/2020; 4:00 p.m.	No. 13	at No. 19 DePaul	W 93–91	2–0	Wintrust Arena; Chicago, IL
12/2/2020; 11:00 a.m.	No. 12	Lamar	W 80–63	3–0	Reed Arena; College Station, TX
12/6/2020; 7:00 p.m.	No. 12	at No. 25 Texas; Big 12/SEC Women's Challenge	W 66–61	4–0	Frank Erwin Center (1,069); Austin, TX
12/10/2020; 6:00 p.m.	No. 10	at Little Rock	W 79–56	5–0	Jack Stephens Center; Little Rock, AR
12/13/2020; 5:00 p.m.	No. 10	Abilene Christian	W 77–59	6–0	Reed Arena; College Station, TX
12/15/2020; 2:00 p.m.	No. 10	Sam Houston State	W 99–69	7–0	Reed Arena; College Station, TX
12/20/2020; 2:00 p.m.	No. 10	Rice	W 57–53	8–0	Reed Arena; College Station, TX
12/28/2020; 7:00 pm, SECN+	No. 9	Northwestern State	W 112–26	9–0	Reed Arena; College Station, TX
SEC regular season
1/03/2021; Noon	No. 9	at Florida	W 92–67	10–0 (1–0)	O'Connell Center; Gainesville, FL
1/07/2021; 8:00 p.m.	No. 8	No. 10 Kentucky	W 77–60	11–0 (2–0)	Reed Arena; College Station, TX
1/10/2021; 3:00 p.m.	No. 8	at No. 13 Arkansas	W 74–73	12–0 (3–0)	Bud Walton Arena; Fayetteville, AR
1/14/2021; 7:00 pm, ESPN+	No. 7	at LSU	L 61–65 ^{OT}	12–1 (3–1)	Maravich Center; Baton Rouge, LA
1/17/2021; Noon, ESPN2	No. 7	No. 14 Mississippi State	W 69–41	13–1 (4–1)	Reed Arena; College Station, TX
1/24/2021; 4:00 p.m.	No. 8	at Missouri	W 70–66	14–1 (5–1)	Mizzou Arena; Columbia, MO
1/28/2021; 8:00 p.m., SECN	No. 8	at Auburn	W 84–69	15–1 (6–1)	Auburn Arena; Auburn, AL
1/31/2021; 4:00 p.m.	No. 8	No. 22 Georgia	W 60–48	16–1 (7–1)	Reed Arena; College Station, TX
2/04/2021; 8:00 p.m., SECN	No. 7	LSU	W 54–41	17–1 (8–1)	Reed Arena; College Station, TX
2/07/2021; 2:00 pm, SECN	No. 7	No. 16 Arkansas	W 69–67	18–1 (9–1)	Reed Arena; College Station, TX
2/11/2021	No. 6	at Vanderbilt	Canceled		Memorial Gymnasium; Nashville, TN
2/14/2021; 2:00 pm, ESPN	No. 6	No. 16 Tennessee	W 80–70	19–1 (10–1)	Reed Arena; College Station, TX
2/18/2021; 7:00 pm, SECN+	No. 5	Missouri	Postponed		Reed Arena; College Station, TX
2/21/2021; 3:00 p.m., SECN	No. 5	at Ole Miss	W 66–55	20–1 (11–1)	The Pavilion at Ole Miss; Oxford, MS
2/25/2021; 6:00 pm, SECN+	No. 3	at Alabama	W 73–67	21–1 (12–1)	Coleman Coliseum; Tuscaloosa, AL
2/28/2021; 1:00 pm, ESPN2	No. 3	No. 5 South Carolina	W 65–57	22–1 (13–1)	Reed Arena; College Station, TX
SEC Tournament
3/5/2021; 10:00 am, SECN	(1) No. 2	vs. (8) LSU; Quarterfinals	W 77–58	23–1	Bon Secours Wellness Arena; Greenville, SC
3/6/2021; 3:00 pm, ESPNU	(1) No. 2	vs. (4) No. 16 Georgia; Semifinals	L 68–74	23–2	Bon Secours Wellness Arena; Greenville, SC
NCAA tournament
3/22/2021; 5:00 pm, ESPN2	(2 M) No. 4	vs. (15 M) Troy; First Round	W 84–80	24–2	Frank Erwin Center; Austin, TX
3/24/2021; 6:00 pm, ESPN2	(2 M) No. 4	vs. (7 M) Iowa State; Second Round	W 84–82 ^{OT}	25–2	Alamodome; San Antonio, TX
3/27/2021; 7:00 pm, ESPN2	(2 M) No. 4	vs. (3 M) No. 11 Arizona; Sweet Sixteen	L 59–74	25–3	Alamodome; San Antonio, TX
*Non-conference game. ^{#}Rankings from AP Poll. (#) Tournament seedings in parentheses. M=Mercado regional. All times are in Central Time.
