= 2020–21 Tennessee Lady Volunteers basketball team =

Intercollegiate basketball season

2020–21 Tennessee Lady Volunteers basketball

NCAA tournament, second round
- Conference: Southeastern Conference

Ranking
- Coaches: No. 21
- AP: No. 13
- Record: 17–8 (9–4 SEC)
- Head coach: Kellie Harper (2nd season)
- Assistant coaches: Lacey Goldwire; Jon Harper; Jennifer Sullivan
- Home arena: Thompson–Boling Arena

2020–21 SEC women's basketball standings
	Conf.				Overall
Team	W		L	PCT	W		L	PCT
No. 4 Texas A&M	13	–	1	.929	25	–	3	.893
No. 6 South Carolina †	14	–	2	.875	26	–	5	.839
No. 13 Tennessee	9	–	4	.692	17	–	8	.680
No. 10 Georgia	10	–	5	.667	20	–	6	.769
No. 15 Arkansas	9	–	6	.600	19	–	8	.704
No. 18 Kentucky	9	–	6	.600	18	–	8	.692
Alabama	8	–	8	.500	16	–	9	.640
LSU	6	–	8	.429	9	–	13	.409
Mississippi State	5	–	7	.417	10	–	9	.526
Missouri	5	–	9	.357	9	–	13	.409
Ole Miss	4	–	10	.286	15	–	12	.556
Florida	3	–	11	.214	12	–	14	.462
Auburn	0	–	15	.000	5	–	19	.208
Vanderbilt^{%}	0	–	3	.000	4	–	4	.500
† 2021 SEC tournament winner % Vanderbilt suspended their season on January 18, 2021; As of March 21, 2021; Rankings from AP poll

The 2020–21 Tennessee Lady Volunteers basketball team represented the University of Tennessee in the 2020–21 college basketball season. Led by former Lady Vol Kellie Harper, entering her second year as head coach, the team played their games at Thompson–Boling Arena and are members of the Southeastern Conference.

== Previous season ==
The 2019–20 team finished the season 21–10, 10–6 for a third-place tie in SEC play. They lost in the quarterfinals of the SEC tournament to Kentucky.

== Preseason ==
=== SEC media poll ===
The SEC media poll was released on November 17, 2020 with the Lady Volunteers selected to finish in sixth place in the SEC.

Media poll
Predicted finish	Team
1	South Carolina
2	Kentucky
3	Texas A&M
4	Arkansas
5	Mississippi State
6	Tennessee
7	LSU
8	Alabama
9	Georgia
10	Missouri
11	Ole Miss
12	Florida
13	Vanderbilt
14	Auburn

=== Preseason All-SEC teams ===
Rennia Davis was selected to the preseason all-SEC team, her third-straight honor.

== Roster ==
2020–21 Tennessee Lady Volunteers women's basketball team
Players
Coaches

Pos.	#	Name	Height	Year	Previous school	Hometown
G/F	0	Rennia Davis	6 ft 2 in (1.88 m)	Sr	Jean Ribault HS	Jacksonville, FL
G	2	Destiny Salary	6 ft 0 in (1.83 m)	Fr	Jonesboro HS	Jonesboro, AR
G	4	Jordan Walker	5 ft 8 in (1.73 m)	RS Jr	Western Michigan University	Muskegon, MI
G	10	Jessie Rennie	5 ft 6 in (1.68 m)	So	Bendigo Senior Secondary College	Bendigo, AUS
C	11	Kasiyahna Kushkituah	6 ft 4 in (1.93 m)	Sr	St. Francis HS	Atlanta, GA
G/F	12	Rae Burrell	6 ft 1 in (1.85 m)	Jr	Liberty HS	Henderson, NV
F/C	13	Keyen Green (injured)	6 ft 1 in (1.85 m)	Sr	Liberty University	Philadelphia, PA
F	15	Jaiden McCoy (injured)	6 ft 1 in (1.85 m)	RS Sr	Northwest Florida State	Knoxville, TN
C	20	Tamari Key	6 ft 5 in (1.96 m)	So	Cary HS	Cary, NC
G/F	21	Tess Darby	6 ft 1 in (1.85 m)	Fr	Greenfield HS	Greenfield, TN
G	25	Jordan Horston	6 ft 2 in (1.88 m)	So	Columbus Africentric Early College	Columbus, OH
C	31	Emily Saunders	6 ft 5 in (1.96 m)	So	Wyoming East HS	Mullens, WV
G/F	33	Marta Suárez	6 ft 2 in (1.88 m)	Fr	Joaquim Blume Institute	Oviedo, Spain

Head coach

- Kellie Harper (Tennessee)

Assistant coach(es)

- Lacey Goldwire (East Central)
- Jon Harper (Auburn)
- Jennifer Sullivan (Memphis)

Legend

- (C) Team captain
- (S) Suspended
- (I) Ineligible
- (W) Walk-on
- Injured
- Current redshirt

Roster

== Rankings ==
Ranking movements Legend: ██ Increase in ranking ██ Decrease in ranking RV = Received votes
	Week																				
Poll	Pre	1	2	3	4	5	6	7	8	9	10	11	12	13	14	15	16	17	18	19	Final
AP	RV	RV	RV			RV	RV	RV	23	25	20	18	16	21	14	14					
Coaches	RV	RV				RV	RV	24	RV	22	19	19	21	20							

^Coaches' Poll did not release a second poll at the same time as the AP.

== Schedule ==
Date time, TV	Rank^{#}	Opponent^{#}	Result	Record	High points	High rebounds	High assists	Site (attendance) city, state
Regular season
11/27/2020*; 1:00 pm, SECN+		Florida A&M						Thompson–Boling Arena; Knoxville, TN
11/28/2020*; 2:00 pm, SECN+		Western Kentucky	W 87–47	1–0	18 – Burrell	11 – Davis	7 – Burrell	Thompson–Boling Arena (2,239); Knoxville, TN
12/1/2020*; 7:00 pm, SECN+		ETSU	W 67–50	2–0	20 – Burrell	8 – Suarez	3 – Tied	Thompson–Boling Arena (2,156); Knoxville, TN
12/6/2020*; 2:00 pm, ESPN+		at West Virginia; Big 12/SEC Women's Challenge	L 73–79 ^{OT}	2–1	18 – Burrell	9 – Green	6 – Davis	WVU Coliseum (142); Morgantown, WV
12/10/2020*; 7:00 pm, SECN+		Furman	W 90–53	3–1	26 – Burrell	8 – Suarez	7 – Burrell	Thompson–Boling Arena (2,137); Knoxville, TN
12/13/2020*; 5:00 pm, ESPN		at No. 23 Texas						Frank Erwin Center; Austin, TX
12/17/2020*; 4:00 pm		at No. 15 Indiana	W 66–58	4–1	19 – Davis	15 – Davis	6 – Horston	Simon Skjodt Assembly Hall; Bloomington, IN
12/20/2020*; Noon, SECN		UNC Greensboro	W 66–40	5–1	13 – Kushkituah	7 – Suarez	5 – Tied	Thompson–Boling Arena (2,114); Knoxville, TN
12/28/2020*; 7:00 pm, SECN+		Lipscomb	W 77–52	6–1	19 – Davis	11 – Davis	4 – Tied	Thompson–Boling Arena (2,141); Knoxville, TN
1/7/2021; 6:30 pm, SECN		No. 13 Arkansas	W 88–73	7–1 (1–0)	26 – Tied	11 – Davis	5 – Tied	Thompson–Boling Arena (2,143); Knoxville, TN
1/10/2021; 2:00 pm, SECN+		at LSU	W 64–63	8–1 (2–0)	18 – Burrell	9 – Davis	2 – Tied	Maravich Center (762); Baton Rouge, LA
1/14/2021; 6:30 pm, SECN	No. 23	Georgia	L 66–67	8–2 (2–1)	15 – Davis	7 – Kushkituah	4 – Horston	Thompson–Boling Arena (2,167); Knoxville, TN
1/17/2021; 3:00 pm, SECN+	No. 23	at Alabama	W 82–56	9–2 (3–1)	21 – Davis	10 – Davis	7 – Horston	Coleman Coliseum (914); Tuscaloosa, AL
1/21/2021*; 7:00 pm, ESPN	No. 25	No. 3 UConn; Rivalry	L 61–67	9–3	18 – Burrell	9 – Tied	5 – Walker	Thompson–Boling Arena (3,553); Knoxville, TN
1/24/2021; 2:00 pm, ESPN2	No. 25	No. 12 Kentucky; Rivalry	W 70–53	10–3 (4–1)	19 – Key	20 – Davis	7 – Horston	Thompson–Boling Arena (2,609); Knoxville, TN
1/28/2021; 7:00 pm, SECN+	No. 20	Ole Miss	W 68–67	11–3 (5–1)	21 – Davis	8 – Kushkituah	4 – Salary	Thompson–Boling Arena (2,167); Knoxville, TN
1/31/2021; 2:00 pm, ESPNU	No. 20	Florida	W 79–65	12–3 (6–1)	23 – Key	12 – Kushkituah	4 – Tied	Thompson–Boling Arena (2,409); Knoxville, TN
2/11/2021; 7:00 pm, SECN+	No. 16	at No. 20 Kentucky; Rivalry	L 56–71	12–4 (6–2)	22 – Burrell	9 – Walker	3 – Horston	Memorial Coliseum (1,683); Lexington, KY
2/14/2021; 3:00 pm, ESPN	No. 16	at No. 6 Texas A&M	L 70–80	12–5 (6–3)	25 – Davis	10 – Key	7 – Horston	Reed Arena (500); College Station, TX
2/16/2021; 5:00 pm, ESPNU		at Mississippi State	Postponed due to weather concerns.					Humphrey Coliseum; Starkville, MS
2/18/2021; 7:00 pm, SECN	No. 21	No. 2 South Carolina	W 75–67	13–5 (7–3)	24 – Davis	12 – Davis	5 – Horston	Thompson–Boling Arena (2,512); Knoxville, TN
2/21/2021; Noon, SECN	No. 21	at No. 22 Georgia	L 55–57	13–6 (7–4)	22 – Davis	13 – Kushkituah	1 – Tied	Stegeman Coliseum; Athens, GA
2/25/2021; 8:00 pm, SECN+	No. 20	at Missouri	W 78–73	14–6 (8–4)	26 – Davis	10 – Walker	6 – Horston	Mizzou Arena (1,828); Columbia, MO
2/28/2021; 2:00 pm, SECN	No. 20	Auburn	W 88–54	15–6 (9–4)	23 – Davis	11 – Davis	9 – Horston	Thompson–Boling Arena; Knoxville, TN
SEC tournament
March 5, 2021; 8:30 pm, SECN	(3) No. 14	vs. (11) Ole Miss; Quarterfinals	W 77–72	16–6	33 – Davis	14 – Davis	5 – Horston	Bon Secours Wellness Arena; Greenville, SC
March 6, 2021; 6:30 pm, ESPNU	(3) No. 14	vs. (2) No. 7 South Carolina; Semifinals	L 52–67	16–7	11 – Tied	6 – Tied	3 – Burrell	Bon Secours Wellness Arena; Greenville, SC
NCAA tournament
March 21, 2021; 2:00 pm, ABC	(3 RW) No. 13	vs. (14 RW) Middle Tennessee; First Round	W 87–62	17–7	24 – Davis	14 – Tied	6 – Horston	Frank Erwin Center; Austin, TX
March 23, 2021; ABC	(3 RW) No. 13	vs. (6 RW) No. 16 Michigan; Second Round	L 55–70	17–8	12 – Davis	9 – Key	2 – Walker	Alamodome; San Antonio, TX
*Non-conference game. ^{#}Rankings from AP Poll. (#) Tournament seedings in parentheses. RW=River Walk regional. All times are in Eastern Time. 2020–21 Schedule
