= 2020–21 Georgia Lady Bulldogs basketball team =

Intercollegiate basketball season

2020–21 Georgia Lady Bulldogs basketball

NCAA tournament, second round
- Conference: Southeastern Conference

Ranking
- Coaches: No. 12
- AP: No. 10
- Record: 21–7 (10–5 SEC)
- Head coach: Joni Taylor (6th season)
- Assistant coaches: Karen Lange; Chelsea Newton; Robert Mosley
- Home arena: Stegeman Coliseum

2020–21 SEC women's basketball standings
	Conf.				Overall
Team	W		L	PCT	W		L	PCT
No. 4 Texas A&M	13	–	1	.929	25	–	3	.893
No. 6 South Carolina †	14	–	2	.875	26	–	5	.839
No. 13 Tennessee	9	–	4	.692	17	–	8	.680
No. 10 Georgia	10	–	5	.667	20	–	6	.769
No. 15 Arkansas	9	–	6	.600	19	–	8	.704
No. 18 Kentucky	9	–	6	.600	18	–	8	.692
Alabama	8	–	8	.500	16	–	9	.640
LSU	6	–	8	.429	9	–	13	.409
Mississippi State	5	–	7	.417	10	–	9	.526
Missouri	5	–	9	.357	9	–	13	.409
Ole Miss	4	–	10	.286	15	–	12	.556
Florida	3	–	11	.214	12	–	14	.462
Auburn	0	–	15	.000	5	–	19	.208
Vanderbilt^{%}	0	–	3	.000	4	–	4	.500
† 2021 SEC tournament winner % Vanderbilt suspended their season on January 18, 2021; As of March 21, 2021; Rankings from AP poll

The 2020–21 Georgia Lady Bulldogs basketball team represented the University of Georgia during the 2020–21 NCAA Division I women's basketball season. The Lady Bulldogs, led by sixth-year head coach Joni Taylor, played their home games at the Stegeman Coliseum and competed as members of the Southeastern Conference (SEC). They finished the season 21–7 (10–5 SEC) and earned an at-large bid to the NCAA tournament, where they lost in the second round to Oregon.

== Preseason ==
The SEC media poll was released on November 17, 2020.

Media poll
Predicted finish	Team
1	South Carolina
2	Kentucky
3	Texas A&M
4	Arkansas
5	Mississippi State
6	Tennessee
7	LSU
8	Alabama
9	Georgia
10	Missouri
11	Ole Miss
12	Florida
13	Vanderbilt
14	Auburn

== Roster ==
2020–21 Georgia Lady Bulldogs women's basketball team
Players
Coaches

Pos.	#	Name	Height	Year	Previous school	Hometown
G	0	Zoesha Smith	5 ft 8 in (1.73 m)	Fr	Glynn Academy	Brunswick, GA
G	1	Chloe Chapman	5 ft 8 in (1.73 m)	So	Our Lady of Good Counsel HS	Mitchellville, MD
G	2	Gabby Connally	5 ft 6 in (1.68 m)	Jr	Louis D. Brandeis HS	San Antonio, TX
F	3	Sarah Ashlee Barker	5 ft 10 in (1.78 m)	Fr	Spain Park HS	Birmingham, AL
G	4	Mikayla Coombs	5 ft 9 in (1.75 m)	RS Jr	Wesleyan School	Buford, GA
G	10	Caitlin Hose	5 ft 8 in (1.73 m)	Jr	Hazel Green HS	Hazel Green, AL
G	11	Maya Caldwell	5 ft 10 in (1.78 m)	Sr	Davidson Day School	Charlotte, NC
G	12	Kaila Hubbard	5 ft 9 in (1.75 m)	So	Holy Innocents' Episcopal School	Jonesboro, GA
C	14	Jenna Staiti	6 ft 4 in (1.93 m)	RS Sr	West Forsyth HS	Cumming, GA
C	15	Maori Davenport	6 ft 4 in (1.93 m)	So	Charles Henderson HS	Troy, AL
F	20	Jordan Isaacs	6 ft 0 in (1.83 m)	So	St. Francis School	Alpharetta, GA
F	22	Malury Bates	6 ft 2 in (1.88 m)	RS Jr	William Fleming HS	Roanoke, VA
G	23	Que Morrison	5 ft 7 in (1.7 m)	Sr	McEachern HS	Riverdale, GA
F	35	Javyn Nicholson	6 ft 2 in (1.88 m)	So	Collins Hill HS	Lawrenceville, GA

Head coach

- Joni Taylor (Alabama)

Assistant coach(es)

- Karen Lange (Iowa)
- Chelsea Newton (Rutgers)
- Robert Mosley (Miles)

Legend

- (C) Team captain
- (S) Suspended
- (I) Ineligible
- (W) Walk-on
- Injured
- Current redshirt

Roster
Last update: March 25, 2024

== Rankings ==
Ranking movements Legend: ██ Increase in ranking ██ Decrease in ranking RV = Received votes
	Week																				
Poll	Pre	1	2	3	4	5	6	7	8	9	10	11	12	13	14	15	16	17	18	19	Final
AP				RV	RV	RV	RV	RV	RV	22	22	25	24	22	17	16	12				
Coaches									23	21	25	25	23								

^Coaches' Poll did not release a second poll at the same time as the AP.

== Schedule ==
Date time, TV	Rank^{#}	Opponent^{#}	Result	Record	High points	High rebounds	High assists	Site (attendance) city, state
Non-conference regular season
November 25, 2020; 6:00 pm, ESPN+		at Mercer	W 83–64	1–0	15 – Nicholson	7 – Nicholson	5 – Coombs	Hawkins Arena (772); Macon, GA
November 29, 2020; 2:00 pm, ACCNX		at Georgia Tech	W 75–69 ^{OT}	2–0	21 – Staiti	12 – Staiti	4 – Connally	McCamish Pavilion (1,200); Atlanta, GA
December 3, 2020; 4:00 pm, ESPN+		at East Carolina	W 66–45	3–0	13 – Morrison	6 – Nicholson	7 – Connally	Williams Arena; Greenville, NC
December 6, 2020; Noon, SECN		Oklahoma; Big 12/SEC Women's Challenge	W 93–80	4–0	29 – Connally	8 – Staiti	6 – Coombs	Stegeman Coliseum (595); Athens, GA
December 9, 2020; 7:00 pm, SECN+		Jacksonville State	W 68–47	5–0	18 – Staiti	12 – Staiti	4 – Coombs	Stegeman Coliseum (619); Athens, GA
December 12, 2020; Noon, SECN+		Radford	Canceled due to COVID-19					Stegeman Coliseum; Athens, GA
December 17, 2020; 7:00 pm, SECN+		Georgia State	W 85–51	6–0	16 – Tied	12 – Barker	7 – Morrison	Stegeman Coliseum (573); Athens, GA
December 20, 2020; 2:00 pm, SECN+		Furman	W 69–43	7–0	15 – Staiti	13 – Morrison	5 – Morrison	Stegeman Coliseum (583); Athens, GA
December 22, 2020; Noon, SECN+		Appalachian State	W 107–44	8–0	16 – Connally	8 – Staiti	5 – Chapman	Stegeman Coliseum (625); Athens, GA
SEC regular season
December 31, 2020; 7:00 pm, SECN+		No. 12 Mississippi State	L 62–69	8–1 (0–1)	17 – Staiti	10 – Staiti	5 – Connally	Stegeman Coliseum (769); Athens, GA
January 3, 2021; 3:00 pm, SECN+		at Auburn	W 76–44	9–1 (1–1)	13 – Staiti	8 – Nicholson	5 – Morrison	Auburn Arena (657); Auburn, AL
January 10, 2021; Noon, SECN		Florida	W 68–58	10–1 (2–1)	17 – Staiti	10 – Staiti	5 – Coombs	Stegeman Coliseum (739); Athens, GA
January 14, 2021; 6:30 pm, SECN		at No. 23 Tennessee	W 67–66	11–1 (3–1)	17 – Tied	6 – Morrison	7 – Coombs	Thompson–Boling Arena (2,167); Knoxville, TN
January 17, 2021; 3:00 pm, SECN		Ole Miss	W 73–57	12–1 (4–1)	16 – Staiti	6 – Coombs	5 – Coombs	Stegeman Coliseum (825); Athens, GA
January 21, 2021; 6:30 pm, SECN	No. 22	at No. 4 South Carolina	L 50–62	12–2 (4–2)	15 – Tied	9 – Staiti	3 – Chapman	Colonial Life Arena (3,500); Columbia, SC
January 25, 2021; 7:00 pm, SECN	No. 22	No. 19 Arkansas	W 75–73	13–2 (5–2)	20 – Tied	13 – Staiti	4 – Tied	Stegeman Coliseum (701); Athens, GA
January 28, 2021; 7:00 pm, SECN+	No. 22	LSU	L 52–60	13–3 (5–3)	19 – Staiti	8 – Staiti	3 – Connally	Stegeman Coliseum (759); Athens, GA
January 31, 2021; 5:00 pm, SECN	No. 22	at No. 8 Texas A&M	L 48–60	13–4 (5–4)	18 – Connally	6 – Isaacs	2 – Caldwell	Reed Arena (1,328); College Station, TX
February 4, 2021; 7:00 pm, SECN	No. 25	at Alabama	W 83–76 ^{OT}	14–4 (6–4)	24 – Morrison	9 – Staiti	4 – Connally	Coleman Coliseum; Tuscaloosa, AL
February 11, 2021; 7:00 pm, SECN+	No. 24	Auburn	W 74–54	15–4 (7–4)	14 – Morrison	10 – Caldwell	6 – Caldwell	Stegeman Coliseum; Athens, GA
February 14, 2021; 2:00 pm, ESPNU	No. 24	at Missouri	W 82–64	16–4 (8–4)	29 – Connally	11 – Staiti	6 – Coombs	Mizzou Arena (1,848); Columbia, MO
February 18, 2021; 7:00 pm, SECN+		at Vanderbilt	Canceled due to Vanderbilt ending season					Memorial Gymnasium; Nashville, TN
February 21, 2021; Noon, SECN	No. 22	No. 21 Tennessee	W 57–55	17–4 (9–4)	24 – Connally	12 – Staiti	4 – Morrison	Stegeman Coliseum; Athens, GA
February 25, 2021; 7:00 pm, SECN+	No. 17	No. 19 Kentucky	L 58–62	17–5 (9–5)	16 – Staiti	9 – Isaacs	4 – Isaacs	Stegeman Coliseum; Athens, GA
February 28, 2021; Noon, ESPN2	No. 17	at Florida	W 95–80	18–5 (10–5)	30 – Staiti	13 – Staiti	4 – Morrison	O'Connell Center; Gainesville, FL
SEC Tournament
March 5, 2021; 1:30 pm, SECN	(4) No. 16	vs. (5) No. 17 Kentucky; Quarterfinals	W 78–66	19–5	20 – Tied	12 – Staiti	3 – Tied	Bon Secours Wellness Arena; Greenville, SC
March 6, 2021; 4:00 pm, ESPNU	(4) No. 16	vs. (1) No. 2 Texas A&M; Semifinals	W 74–68	20–5	19 – Caldwell	12 – Staiti	4 – Tied	Bon Secours Wellness Arena; Greenville, SC
March 7, 2021; 2:00 pm, ESPN2	(4) No. 16	vs. (2) No. 7 South Carolina; Championship	L 62–67	20–6	20 – Morrison	8 – Morrison	3 – Caldwell	Bon Secours Wellness Arena; Greenville, SC
NCAA tournament
March 22, 2021; Noon, ESPN2	(3 A) No. 10	vs. (14 A) Drexel; First round	W 67–53	21–6	19 – Staiti	12 – Morrison	8 – Morrison	Bill Greehey Arena; San Antonio, TX
March 24, 2021; 3:00 pm, ESPN2	(3 A) No. 10	vs. (6 A) Oregon; Second round	L 50–57	21–7	18 – Staiti	9 – Staiti	4 – Coombs	Alamodome; San Antonio, TX
*Non-conference game. ^{#}Rankings from AP poll. (#) Tournament seedings in parentheses. A=Alamo regional. All times are in Eastern Time.
