= 2021 Women's National Invitation Tournament =

College basketball postseason tournament

- Season: 2020–21
- Teams: 32
- Finals site: My Town Movers Fieldhouse, Collierville, Tennessee
- Champions: Rice (1st title)
- Runner-up: Ole Miss (1st title game)
- Semifinalists: Delaware (1st semifinal); Northern Iowa (1st semifinal)
- Winning coach: Tina Langley (1st title)
- MVP: Nancy Mulkey (Rice)
- Attendance: 600 (championship game)

The 2021 Women's National Invitation Tournament was a tournament of 32 NCAA Division I teams that were not selected to participate in the 2021 NCAA Division I women's basketball tournament. The tournament committee announced the 32-team field on March 15, 2021, following the selection of the NCAA Tournament field. The tournament began on March 19, 2021, with the championship game on March 28, 2021. Rice won its first WNIT championship. All games were streamed on FloSports.

== Format changes ==
Changes were made in order to ensure continued viability for the tournament during the COVID-19 pandemic. The field of teams was halved from 64 to 32. Games were not held on-campus; instead there were regional sites. Each conference was not guaranteed an automatic bid as they have been in the past. Teams also were not required to have at least a .500 record.

== Participants ==
The 2021 WNIT field consisted of nine automatic invitations and twenty-three at-large teams. Automatic bids were given to regular season conference champions that did not win their conference tournaments, except for WAC regular season and conference tournament champion California Baptist, since they are still in transition to Division I and are ineligible to participate in the NCAA Women's Tournament until 2023.

=== Automatic qualifiers ===
| Conference | School |
|---|---|
| Atlantic 10 | Dayton |
| Colonial | Delaware |
| C-USA | Rice |
| Mid-American | Bowling Green |
| Mountain West | New Mexico |
| Ohio Valley | UT Martin |
| Southern | Samford |
| Sun Belt | Louisiana |
| WAC | California Baptist |

=== At-large bids ===
| Conference | School |
|---|---|
| Pac-12 | Arizona State |
| C-USA | Charlotte |
| ACC | Clemson |
| Pac-12 | Colorado |
| Big East | Creighton |
| Big East | DePaul |
| Missouri Valley | Drake |
| SEC | Florida |
| Atlantic 10 | Fordham |
| Mountain West | Fresno State |
| AAC | Houston |
| Missouri Valley | Illinois State |
| Horizon | Milwaukee |
| SEC | Missouri |
| Big Ten | Nebraska |
| Missouri Valley | Northern Iowa |
| Mid-American | Ohio |
| SEC | Ole Miss |
| Atlantic 10 | Saint Louis |
| West Coast | San Francisco |
| AAC | Tulane |
| Atlantic 10 | UMass |
| Big East | Villanova |

== Bracket ==
* – Denotes overtime period

=== Charlotte Regional – Charlotte, North Carolina ===
- Played at Bojangles Coliseum in Charlotte, North Carolina.

First round March 19
Fordham | 49
Delaware | 77
Ohio | 60
Clemson | 65
Charlotte | 65
Florida | 66
UMass | 51
Villanova | 78

Second round March 20
Delaware | 87
Clemson | 74
Florida | 57
Villanova | 77

Quarterfinals; March 22
Delaware | 77
Villanova | 70

Consolation Games

March 20
Fordham | 65
Ohio | 81
Charlotte | 75
UMass | 81

March 22
Ohio | 71
UMass | 95

=== Fort Worth Regional – Fort Worth, Texas ===
- Played at Wilkerson–Greines Activity Center in Fort Worth, Texas.

First round March 19
Arizona State | 36
Rice | 48
Fresno State | 78
Missouri | 75
San Francisco | 71
Houston | 63
California Baptist | 90
New Mexico | 85

Second round March 20
Rice | 87
Fresno State | 73
San Francisco | 82
California Baptist | 90

Quarterfinals; March 22
Rice | 79
California Baptist | 55

Consolation Games

March 20
Arizona State | 50
Missouri | 39
Houston
~~New Mexico~~ (Note: Game declared no contest. Houston advances in tournament.)

March 22
Arizona State | 48
Houston | 50

=== Memphis Regional – Collierville, Tennessee ===
- Played at My Town Movers Fieldhouse in Collierville, Tennessee.

First round March 19
UT Martin | 46
Nebraska | 72
Louisiana | 45
Colorado | 68
Samford | 45
Ole Miss | 64
Illinois State | 67
Tulane | 75

Second round March 20
Nebraska | 71
Colorado | 75
Ole Miss | 72
Tulane | 61

Quarterfinals; March 22
Colorado | 56
Ole Miss | 65

Consolation Games

March 20
UT Martin | 58
Louisiana | 48
Samford | 62
Illinois State | 68

March 22
UT Martin | 64
Illinois State | 59

=== Rockford Regional – Rockford, Illinois ===
- Played at UW Health Sports Factory in Rockford, Illinois.

First round March 19
Northern Iowa | 70
Dayton | 56
Creighton | 72
Bowling Green | 65
Saint Louis | 74
DePaul | 72
Milwaukee | 84
Drake | 46

Second round March 20
Northern Iowa | 64
Creighton | 63
Saint Louis | 61
Milwaukee | 44

Quarterfinals; March 22
Northern Iowa | 58
Saint Louis | 50

Consolation Games

March 20
Dayton | 76
Bowling Green | 77
DePaul | 91
Drake | 100

March 22
Bowling Green | 68
Drake | 78

=== Semifinals and Championship Game – Collierville, Tennessee ===
- Played at My Town Movers Fieldhouse in Collierville, Tennessee.

Semifinals; March 26
Delaware | 75
Rice | 85
Ole Miss | 60
Northern Iowa | 50

Championship Game; March 28
Rice | 71
Ole Miss | 58

==== Semifinals ====
Rice scored the first six points in a semi final game against Delaware, but the Blue Hens responded to tie up the game at 12 points apiece. Shortly thereafter, Rice went on an 11–0 run to open up a double-digit lead. Rice held a comfortable lead for most of the game, although Delaware cut the lead to seven points in the final minute. Delaware was forced to foul and Rice made the free throws to extend the lead back to double digits, and finished with a 10 point win, 85–75. Lauren Schwartz was the leading scorer for Rice with 25 points, matched by Jasmine Dickey's 25 points for Delaware. Rice hit 54% of their field goal attempts, and did even better beyond the arc, hitting nine of 16 for 56%.

In the other semifinal, Mississippi pulled out to a small three point lead, 14–11, little more than halfway through the first quarter. They then held no than Iowa scoreless for about six minutes, extending the lead to double digits, 22–11. Mississippi continued to lead throughout the game and ending up winning by 10 points, 60–50. The wind moved Mississippi into the title game, the first SEC team to advance to the WNIT title game since Auburn won the tournament in 2003.

Friday, March 26, 2021
4:00 pm (CT)

Delaware 75, Rice 85
Scoring by quarter: 16–26, 10–18, 26–23, 23–18
| Pts: 25 – Dickey; Rebs: 13 – Dickey; Asts: 4 – Dickey | Pts: 25 – Schwartz; Rebs: 11 – Mulkey; Asts: 7 – Wiggins |

My Town Movers Fieldhouse
Collierville, Tennessee
Attendance: 300

Friday, March 26, 2021
7:00 pm (CT)

Ole Miss 60, Northern Iowa 50
Scoring by quarter: 20–11, 11–12, 18–14, 11–13
| Pts: 18 – Austin; Rebs: 11 – Scott; Asts: 6 – Reid | Pts: 16 – Rucker; Rebs: 8 – Maahs; Asts: 5 – Rucker |

My Town Movers Fieldhouse
Collierville, Tennessee
Attendance: 300

==== Championship ====
In the championship game, Rice led most of the game opening up a double-digit lead in the third quarter. in the fourth quarter Rice had a 14 point lead with just over seven minutes to go when Mississippi held Rice scoreless for three minutes and cut the lead to four points 58–54. Rice responded, outscoring the rebels 13–4 in the final four minutes of the game to win their first WNIT championship. Lauren Swarts and Nancy Mulkey each had 19 points for Rice. Shakira Austin had 25 points for Mississippi, the only Rebel player in double-digits.

Sunday, March 28, 2021
1:00 pm (CT)

Box score

Rice 71, Ole Miss 58
Scoring by quarter: 17–13, 17–10, 18–17, 19–18
| Pts: 19 – Tied; Rebs: 12 – Mulkey; Asts: 6 – Wiggins | Pts: 25 – Austin; Rebs: 9 – Austin; Asts: 4 – Nesbitt |

My Town Movers Fieldhouse
Collierville, Tennessee
Attendance: 600

== All-tournament team ==
- Nancy Mulkey (Rice), MVP
- Lauren Schwartz (Rice)
- Shakira Austin (Ole Miss)
- Donnetta Johnson (Ole Miss)
- Jasmine Dickey (Delaware)
- Kam Finley (Northern Iowa)

== See also ==
- 2021 National Invitation Tournament
