= 2020–21 LSU Lady Tigers basketball team =

Intercollegiate basketball season

2020–21 LSU Lady Tigers basketball
- Conference: Southeastern Conference
- Record: 9–13 (6–8 SEC)
- Head coach: Nikki Fargas (10th season)
- Assistant coaches: Cherie Cordoba; Aaron Kallhoff; Charlene Thomas-Swinson
- Home arena: Pete Maravich Assembly Center

2020–21 SEC women's basketball standings
| | Conf. | | | | Overall |
| Team | W | | L | PCT | W | | L | PCT |
|---|---|---|---|---|---|---|---|---|
| No. 4 Texas A&M | 13 | – | 1 | .929 | 25 | – | 3 | .893 |
| No. 6 South Carolina † | 14 | – | 2 | .875 | 26 | – | 5 | .839 |
| No. 13 Tennessee | 9 | – | 4 | .692 | 17 | – | 8 | .680 |
| No. 10 Georgia | 10 | – | 5 | .667 | 20 | – | 6 | .769 |
| No. 15 Arkansas | 9 | – | 6 | .600 | 19 | – | 8 | .704 |
| No. 18 Kentucky | 9 | – | 6 | .600 | 18 | – | 8 | .692 |
| Alabama | 8 | – | 8 | .500 | 16 | – | 9 | .640 |
| LSU | 6 | – | 8 | .429 | 9 | – | 13 | .409 |
| Mississippi State | 5 | – | 7 | .417 | 10 | – | 9 | .526 |
| Missouri | 5 | – | 9 | .357 | 9 | – | 13 | .409 |
| Ole Miss | 4 | – | 10 | .286 | 15 | – | 12 | .556 |
| Florida | 3 | – | 11 | .214 | 12 | – | 14 | .462 |
| Auburn | 0 | – | 15 | .000 | 5 | – | 19 | .208 |
| Vanderbilt^{%} | 0 | – | 3 | .000 | 4 | – | 4 | .500 |
† 2021 SEC tournament winner % Vanderbilt suspended their season on January 18, 2021; As of March 21, 2021; Rankings from AP poll

The 2020–21 LSU Lady Tigers basketball team represented Louisiana State University during the 2020–21 NCAA Division I women's basketball season. The Lady Tigers, led by tenth-year head coach Nikki Fargas, played their home games at Pete Maravich Assembly Center and competed as members of the Southeastern Conference (SEC).

Fargas (nee Caldwell), an All-American player for the Tennessee Lady Vols from 1990-94 under Naismith Hall of Fame coach Pat Summitt, resigned following the season and became president of the WNBA's Las Vegas Aces. LSU hired Baylor coach Kim Mulkey, a Louisiana native, as Fargas' successor on April 26, 2021.

== Preseason ==
=== SEC media poll ===
The SEC media poll was released on November 17, 2020 with the Lady Tigers selected to finish in seventh place in the SEC.

Media poll
| Predicted finish | Team |
| 1 | South Carolina |
| 2 | Kentucky |
| 3 | Texas A&M |
| 4 | Arkansas |
| 5 | Mississippi State |
| 6 | Tennessee |
| 7 | LSU |
| 8 | Alabama |
| 9 | Georgia |
| 10 | Missouri |
| 11 | Ole Miss |
| 12 | Florida |
| 13 | Vanderbilt |
| 14 | Auburn |

=== Preseason All-SEC teams ===
The Lady Tigers had one player selected to the preseason all-SEC teams.

First team

Khayla Pointer

== Schedule ==
| Date time, TV | Rank^{#} | Opponent^{#} | Result | Record | High points | High rebounds | High assists | Site (attendance) city, state |
Non-conference regular season
| November 27, 2020*; 8:30 pm | | vs. BYU; South Point Thanksgiving Shootout | L 51–67 | 0–1 | 15 – Trasi | 10 – Aifuwa | 5 – Pointer | South Point Hotel, Casino & Spa; Enterprise, NV |
| November 28, 2020*; 5:45 pm | | vs. West Virginia; South Point Thanksgiving Shootout | L 42–62 | 0–2 | 12 – Aifuwa | 6 – Tied | 2 – Tied | South Point Hotel, Casino & Spa; Enterprise, NV |
| December 4, 2020*; 6:00 pm, SECN+ | | UCF | L 48–58 | 0–3 | 15 – Tied | 8 – Aifuwa | 4 – Pointer | Pete Maravich Assembly Center (729); Baton Rouge, LA |
| December 14, 2020*; 7:00 pm, SECN | | Louisiana | W 62–57 | 1–3 | 15 – Aifuwa | 12 – Aifuwa | 4 – Pointer | Pete Maravich Assembly Center (729); Baton Rouge, LA |
| December 19, 2020*; 3:00 pm | | vs. Pacific; Duel in the Desert | L 64–73 | 1–4 | 16 – Pointer | 13 – Aifuwa | 4 – Pointer | Cox Pavilion; Paradise, NV |
| December 20, 2020*; 2:00 pm | | vs. Loyola Marymount; Duel in the Desert | W 54–52 | 2–4 | 15 – Tied | 10 – Aifuwa | 5 – Davis | Cox Pavilion; Paradise, NV |
SEC regular season
| December 31, 2020; 6:00 pm, SECN+ | | Auburn | W 56–43 | 3–4 (1–0) | 14 – Pointer | 10 – Aifuwa | 4 – Pointer | Pete Maravich Assembly Center (687); Baton Rouge, LA |
| January 3, 2021; 3:00 pm, SECN+ | | at Ole Miss | W 77–69 ^{OT} | 4–4 (2–0) | 20 – Aifuwa | 8 – Young | 12 – Pointer | The Pavilion at Ole Miss (842); Oxford, MS |
| January 7, 2021; 6:00 pm, SECN+ | | at Alabama | L 59–67 | 4–5 (2–1) | 25 – Pointer | 10 – Aifuwa | 5 – Pointer | Coleman Coliseum (571); Tuscaloosa, AL |
| January 10, 2021; 1:00 pm, SECN+ | | Tennessee | L 63–64 | 4–6 (2–2) | 25 – Pointer | 6 – Seay | 5 – Pointer | Pete Maravich Assembly Center (762); Baton Rouge, LA |
| January 14, 2021; 6:00 pm, SECN+ | | No. 7 Texas A&M | W 65–61 ^{OT} | 5–6 (3–2) | 20 – Young | 11 – Aifuwa | 6 – Pointer | Pete Maravich Assembly Center (780); Baton Rouge, LA |
| January 18, 2021; 6:00 pm, SECN | | at Missouri | W 66–64 | 6–6 (4–2) | 22 – Pointer | 8 – Aifuwa | 3 – Tied | Mizzou Arena (1,714); Columbia, MO |
| January 24, 2021; Noon, SECN | | No. 4 South Carolina | L 65–69 | 6–7 (4–3) | 18 – Pointer | 6 – Young | 3 – Pointer | Pete Maravich Assembly Center (918); Baton Rouge, LA |
| January 28, 2021; 6:00 pm, SECN+ | | at Georgia | W 60–52 | 7–7 (5–3) | 17 – Young | 8 – Trasi | 6 – Pointer | Stegeman Coliseum (759); Athens, GA |
| January 31, 2021; 1:00 pm, SECN+ | | Ole Miss | W 75–66 ^{OT} | 8–7 (6–3) | 25 – Pointer | 16 – Aifuwa | 3 – Young | Pete Maravich Assembly Center (802); Baton Rouge, LA |
| February 4, 2021; 8:00 pm, SECN | | at No. 7 Texas A&M | L 41–54 | 8–8 (6–4) | 12 – Pointer | 7 – Trasi | 4 – Young | Reed Arena; College Station, TX |
| February 11, 2021; 6:00 pm, SECN+ | | Florida | L 66–73 ^{OT} | 8–9 (6–5) | 27 – Pointer | 10 – Aifuwa | 4 – Young | Pete Maravich Assembly Center; Baton Rouge, LA |
| February 14, 2021; 11:00 am, SECN | | at No. 1 South Carolina | L 59–66 | 8–10 (6–6) | 19 – Cherry | 12 – Aifuwa | 6 – Pointer | Colonial Life Arena (3,500); Columbia, SC |
| February 19, 2021; 1:00 pm, SECN+ | | at No. 16 Kentucky | Postponed due to weather concerns; game not rescheduled | | | | | Memorial Coliseum; Lexington, KY |
| February 21, 2021; 5:00 pm, SECN | | No. 18 Arkansas | L 64–74 | 8–11 (6–7) | 24 – Pointer | 9 – Cherry | 3 – Pointer | Pete Maravich Assembly Center; Baton Rouge, LA |
| February 25, 2021; 6:00 pm, SECN+ | | Mississippi State | L 59–68 | 8–12 (6–8) | 17 – Pointer | 10 – Aifuwa | 4 – Pointer | Pete Maravich Assembly Center (824); Baton Rouge, LA |
| February 28, 2021; 5:00 pm, SECN | | at Vanderbilt | Canceled due to Vanderbilt ending season | | | | | Memorial Gymnasium; Nashville, TN |
SEC Tournament
| March 4, 2021; 10:00 am, SECN | (8) | vs. (9) Mississippi State; Second Round | W 71–62 | 9–12 | 17 – Payne | 12 – Aifuwa | 3 – Tied | Bon Secours Wellness Arena; Greenville, SC |
| March 5, 2021; 10:00 am, SECN | (8) | vs. (1) No. 2 Texas A&M; Quarterfinals | L 58–77 | 9–13 | 26 – Pointer | 8 – Aifuwa | 4 – Pointer | Bon Secours Wellness Arena; Greenville, SC |
*Non-conference game. ^{#}Rankings from AP Poll. (#) Tournament seedings in parentheses. All times are in Central Time.
