= 2021 SEC women's basketball tournament =

American college basketball postseason tournament

- Classification: Division I
- Season: 2020–21
- Teams: 13
- Site: Bon Secours Wellness Arena; Greenville, SC
- Champions: South Carolina (6th title)
- Winning coach: Dawn Staley (6th title)
- MVP: Aliyah Boston (South Carolina)
- Television: SEC Network, ESPNU, ESPN2

2020–21 SEC women's basketball standings
	Conf.				Overall
Team	W		L	PCT	W		L	PCT
No. 4 Texas A&M	13	–	1	.929	25	–	3	.893
No. 6 South Carolina †	14	–	2	.875	26	–	5	.839
No. 13 Tennessee	9	–	4	.692	17	–	8	.680
No. 10 Georgia	10	–	5	.667	20	–	6	.769
No. 15 Arkansas	9	–	6	.600	19	–	8	.704
No. 18 Kentucky	9	–	6	.600	18	–	8	.692
Alabama	8	–	8	.500	16	–	9	.640
LSU	6	–	8	.429	9	–	13	.409
Mississippi State	5	–	7	.417	10	–	9	.526
Missouri	5	–	9	.357	9	–	13	.409
Ole Miss	4	–	10	.286	15	–	12	.556
Florida	3	–	11	.214	12	–	14	.462
Auburn	0	–	15	.000	5	–	19	.208
Vanderbilt^{%}	0	–	3	.000	4	–	4	.500
† 2021 SEC tournament winner % Vanderbilt suspended their season on January 18, 2021; As of March 21, 2021; Rankings from AP poll

The 2021 Southeastern Conference women's basketball tournament was a postseason women's basketball tournament for the Southeastern Conference held at the Bon Secours Wellness Arena in Greenville, South Carolina, March 3–7, 2021. Vanderbilt cancelled its season after going 4-4 and did not compete in the conference tournament. By winning, South Carolina earned an automatic bid to the 2021 NCAA Division I women's basketball tournament.

== Seeds ==
Seed	School	Conference record	Overall record	Tiebreaker
1	Texas A&M‡	13–1	22–1	
2	South Carolina†	14–2	19–4	
3	Tennessee†	9–4	15–6	
4	Georgia†	10–5	18–5	
5	Kentucky#	9–6	16–7	1–0 vs. Arkansas
6	Arkansas#	9–6	19–7	0–1 vs. Kentucky
7	Alabama#	8–8	15–8	
8	LSU#	6–8	8–12	
9	Mississippi State#	5–7	10–8	
10	Missouri#	5–9	9–10	
11	Ole Miss#	4–10	10–10	
12	Florida	3–11	10–12	
13	Auburn	0–15	5–18	
‡ – SEC regular season champions, and tournament No. 1 seed. † – Received a double-bye in the conference tournament. # – Received a single-bye in the conference tournament. Overall records include all games played in the SEC Tournament.

== Schedule ==
Game	Time	Matchup	Television	Attendance
First round – Wednesday, March 3
1	4:00 pm	No. 12 Florida 69 vs. No. 13 Auburn 62	SEC Network	579
Second round – Thursday, March 4
2	11:00 am	No. 8 LSU 71 vs. No. 9 Mississippi State 62	SEC Network	
3	1:30 pm	No. 5 Kentucky 73 vs. No. 12 Florida 64	SEC Network	
4	6:00 pm	No. 7 Alabama 82 vs. No. 10 Missouri 74	SEC Network	912
5	8:30 pm	No. 6 Arkansas 60 vs. No. 11 Ole Miss 69	SEC Network	912
Quarterfinals – Friday, March 5
6	11:00 am	No. 1 Texas A&M 77 vs. No. 8 LSU 58	SEC Network	1,264
7	1:30 pm	No. 4 Georgia 78 vs. No. 5 Kentucky 66	SEC Network	1,264
8	6:00 pm	No. 2 South Carolina 75 vs. No. 7 Alabama 63	SEC Network	2,409
9	8:30 pm	No. 3 Tennessee 77 vs. No. 11 Ole Miss 72	SEC Network	2,409
Semifinals – Saturday, March 6
10	4:00 pm	No. 1 Texas A&M 68 vs No. 4 Georgia 74	ESPNU	2,662
11	6:30 pm	No. 2 South Carolina 67 vs No. 3 Tennessee 52	ESPNU	2,662
Championship – Sunday, March 7
12	2:00 pm	No. 4 Georgia 62 vs No. 2 South Carolina 67	ESPN2	2,872
Game times in ET. Rankings denote tournament seed

== Bracket ==
First round Wednesday, March 3 SEC Network
12	Florida	69
13	Auburn	62

Second round Thursday, March 4 SEC Network
8	LSU	71
9	Mississippi State	62
5	Kentucky	73
12	Florida	64
7	Alabama	82
10	Missouri	74
6	Arkansas	60
11	Ole Miss	69

Quarterfinals; Friday, March 5 SEC Network
1	Texas A&M	77
8	LSU	58
4	Georgia	78
5	Kentucky	66
2	South Carolina	75
7	Alabama	63
3	Tennessee	77
11	Ole Miss	72

Semifinals; Saturday, March 6 ESPNU
1	Texas A&M	68
4	Georgia	74
2	South Carolina	67
3	Tennessee	52

Championship; Sunday, March 7 ESPN2
4	Georgia	62
2	South Carolina	67

== See also ==
- 2021 SEC men's basketball tournament
