= 2020–21 Florida Gators women's basketball team =

Intercollegiate basketball season

2020–21 Florida Gators women's basketball

WNIT, Second Round
- Conference: Southeastern Conference
- Record: 12–14 (3–11 SEC)
- Head coach: Cameron Newbauer (4th season)
- Assistant coaches: Kelly Rae Finley; Julian Assibey; Erika Lang-Montgomery
- Home arena: O'Connell Center

2020–21 SEC women's basketball standings
	Conf.				Overall
Team	W		L	PCT	W		L	PCT
No. 4 Texas A&M	13	–	1	.929	25	–	3	.893
No. 6 South Carolina †	14	–	2	.875	26	–	5	.839
No. 13 Tennessee	9	–	4	.692	17	–	8	.680
No. 10 Georgia	10	–	5	.667	20	–	6	.769
No. 15 Arkansas	9	–	6	.600	19	–	8	.704
No. 18 Kentucky	9	–	6	.600	18	–	8	.692
Alabama	8	–	8	.500	16	–	9	.640
LSU	6	–	8	.429	9	–	13	.409
Mississippi State	5	–	7	.417	10	–	9	.526
Missouri	5	–	9	.357	9	–	13	.409
Ole Miss	4	–	10	.286	15	–	12	.556
Florida	3	–	11	.214	12	–	14	.462
Auburn	0	–	15	.000	5	–	19	.208
Vanderbilt^{%}	0	–	3	.000	4	–	4	.500
† 2021 SEC tournament winner % Vanderbilt suspended their season on January 18, 2021; As of March 21, 2021; Rankings from AP poll

The 2020–21 Florida Gators women's basketball team represented the University of Florida during the 2020–21 NCAA Division I women's basketball season. The Gators, led by fourth-year head coach Cameron Newbauer, played their home games at the O'Connell Center and competed as members of the Southeastern Conference (SEC).

== Preseason ==
=== SEC media poll ===
The SEC media poll was released on November 17, 2020 with the Gators selected to finish in twelfth place in the SEC.

Media poll
Predicted finish	Team
1	South Carolina
2	Kentucky
3	Texas A&M
4	Arkansas
5	Mississippi State
6	Tennessee
7	LSU
8	Alabama
9	Georgia
10	Missouri
11	Ole Miss
12	Florida
13	Vanderbilt
14	Auburn

=== Preseason All-SEC teams ===
The Gators had one player selected to the preseason all-SEC teams.

Second team

Lavender Briggs

== Schedule ==
Date time, TV	Rank^{#}	Opponent^{#}	Result	Record	High points	High rebounds	High assists	Site (attendance) city, state
Non-conference regular season
November 25, 2020*; 1:00 pm, SECN+		Grambling State	W 90–47	1–0	20 – Smith	12 – Briggs	5 – Briggs	O'Connell Center (620); Gainesville, FL
December 1, 2020*; 6:00 pm, ACCN		at Florida State	L 75–81	1–1	20 – Briggs	5 – Tied	8 – Smith	Donald L. Tucker Civic Center (1,075); Tallahassee, FL
December 2, 2020*; 5:00 pm, SECN+		Charleston Southern	W 67–52	2–1	15 – Smith	7 – Rickards	4 – Briggs	O'Connell Center (649); Gainesville, FL
December 5, 2020*; 1:00 pm, SECN+		Cincinnati	W 81–58	3–1	22 – Briggs	6 – Smith	3 – Briggs	O'Connell Center (928); Gainesville, FL
December 7, 2020*; 8:00 pm, SECN		Florida Atlantic	W 88–76	4–1	27 – Smith	11 – Smith	3 – Tied	O'Connell Center (909); Gainesville, FL
December 9, 2020*; 4:00 pm, ESPN+		at UNC Asheville	W 70–48	5–1	20 – Briggs	9 – Rickards	6 – Smith	Kimmel Arena; Asheville, NC
December 14, 2020*; 1:00 pm, SECN+		Tarleton State	W 84–52	6–1	20 – Briggs	17 – Rickards	5 – Tied	O'Connell Center (513); Gainesville, FL
December 20, 2020*; Noon, ESPN+		at Dayton	Canceled due to COVID-19					UD Arena; Dayton, OH
December 21, 2020*; Noon, SECN+		North Florida	W 89–64	7–1	15 – Tied	15 – Rickards	7 – Briggs	O'Connell Center (609); Gainesville, FL
SEC regular season
December 31, 2021; 7:00 pm, SECN		at No. 5 South Carolina	L 59–75	7–2 (0–1)	23 – Briggs	8 – Rickards	5 – Smith	Colonial Life Arena (3,500); Columbia, SC
January 3, 2021; 1:00 pm, SECN		No. 9 Texas A&M	L 67–92	7–3 (0–2)	19 – Briggs	10 – Rickards	2 – Rickards	O'Connell Center (629); Gainesville, FL
January 7, 2021; 6:00 pm, SECN+		No. 14 Mississippi State	L 56–68	7–4 (0–3)	25 – Briggs	9 – Rickards	2 – Briggs	O'Connell Center (639); Gainesville, FL
January 10, 2021; Noon, SECN		at Georgia	L 58–68	7–5 (0–4)	16 – Briggs	8 – Toonders	6 – Smith	Stegeman Coliseum (739); Athens, GA
January 14, 2021; 8:00pm, SECN+		at No. 17 Arkansas	L 80–84	7–6 (0–5)	41 – Briggs	6 – Toonders	5 – Smith	Bud Walton Arena (1,449); Fayetteville, AR
January 17, 2021; 1:00 pm, SECN		Auburn	W 68–54	8–6 (1–5)	22 – Smith	13 – Smith	4 – Smith	O'Connell Center (702); Gainesville, FL
January 21, 2020; 1:00 pm, SECN		at Vanderbilt	Canceled due to Vanderbilt ending season					Memorial Gymnasium; Nashville, TN
January 24, 2021; 3:00 pm, SECN+		at Ole Miss	W 78–68	9–6 (2–5)	25 – Smith	9 – Rickards	4 – Tied	The Pavilion at Ole Miss (859); Oxford, MS
January 28, 2021; 6:00 pm, ESPN+		Missouri	L 58–61	9–7 (2–6)	19 – Briggs	13 – Toonders	3 – Smith	O'Connell Center (621); Gainesville, FL
January 31, 2021; 2:00 pm, ESPNU		at No. 20 Tennessee	L 65–79	9–8 (2–7)	23 – Tied	10 – Smith	5 – Smith	Thompson–Boling Arena (2,409); Knoxville, TN
February 4, 2021; 6:00 pm, SECN+		Vanderbilt	Canceled due to Vanderbilt ending season					O'Connell Center; Gainesville, FL
February 11, 2021; 7:00 pm, SECN+		at LSU	W 73–66 ^{OT}	10–8 (3–7)	21 – Briggs	10 – Tied	5 – Smith	Pete Maravich Assembly Center (596); Baton Rouge, LA
February 15, 2021; 7:00 pm, SECN		No. 17 Kentucky	L 80–88	10–9 (3–8)	23 – Smith	10 – Tied	6 – Rickards	O'Connell Center (659); Gainesville, FL
February 18, 2021; 6:00 pm, ESPN+		Alabama	L 70–77	10–10 (3–9)	27 – Smith	9 – Rickards	4 – Smith	O'Connell Center (674); Gainesville, FL
February 21, 2021; 2:00 pm, SECN		at Missouri	L 80–96	10–11 (3–10)	34 – Smith	11 – Smith	4 – Smith	Mizzou Arena (1,970); Columbia, MO
February 28, 2021; 12:00 pm, ESPN2		No. 17 Georgia	L 80–95	10–12 (3–11)	16 – Tied	7 – Toonders	3 – Tied	O'Connell Center (1,009); Gainesville, FL
SEC Tournament
March 3, 2021; 4:00 pm, SECN	(12)	vs. (13) Auburn; First Round	W 69–62	11–12	19 – Smith	7 – Tied	4 – Smith	Bon Secours Wellness Arena; Greenville, SC
March 4, 2021; 1:30 pm, SECN	(12)	vs. (5) No. 17 Kentucky; Second Round	L 64–73	11–13	36 – Smith	9 – Smith	3 – Rickards	Bon Secours Wellness Arena; Greenville, SC
WNIT
March 19, 2021; 5:00 pm, FloHoops		vs. Charlotte; First Round – Charlotte Regional	W 66–65	12–13	21 – Smith	18 – Merritt	4 – Smith	Bojangles Coliseum; Charlotte, NC
March 20, 2021; 8:00 pm, FloHoops		vs. Villanova; Second Round – Charlotte Regional	L 57–77	12–14	13 – Moore	9 – Moore	1 – Tied	Bojangles Coliseum; Charlotte, NC
*Non-conference game. ^{#}Rankings from AP Poll. (#) Tournament seedings in parentheses. All times are in Eastern Time.
