= 2020–21 Missouri Tigers women's basketball team =

Intercollegiate basketball season

2020–21 Missouri Tigers women's basketball

WNIT, First Round
- Conference: Southeastern Conference
- Record: 9–13 (5–9 SEC)
- Head coach: Robin Pingeton (11th season)
- Assistant coaches: Ashleen Bracey; Chris Bracey; Jenny Putnam
- Home arena: Mizzou Arena

2020–21 SEC women's basketball standings
	Conf.				Overall
Team	W		L	PCT	W		L	PCT
No. 4 Texas A&M	13	–	1	.929	25	–	3	.893
No. 6 South Carolina †	14	–	2	.875	26	–	5	.839
No. 13 Tennessee	9	–	4	.692	17	–	8	.680
No. 10 Georgia	10	–	5	.667	20	–	6	.769
No. 15 Arkansas	9	–	6	.600	19	–	8	.704
No. 18 Kentucky	9	–	6	.600	18	–	8	.692
Alabama	8	–	8	.500	16	–	9	.640
LSU	6	–	8	.429	9	–	13	.409
Mississippi State	5	–	7	.417	10	–	9	.526
Missouri	5	–	9	.357	9	–	13	.409
Ole Miss	4	–	10	.286	15	–	12	.556
Florida	3	–	11	.214	12	–	14	.462
Auburn	0	–	15	.000	5	–	19	.208
Vanderbilt^{%}	0	–	3	.000	4	–	4	.500
† 2021 SEC tournament winner % Vanderbilt suspended their season on January 18, 2021; As of March 21, 2021; Rankings from AP poll

The 2020–21 Missouri Tigers women's basketball team represented the University of Missouri during the 2020–21 NCAA Division I women's basketball season. The Tigers, led by eleventh-year head coach Robin Pingeton, played their home games at Mizzou Arena and competed as members of the Southeastern Conference (SEC). Missouri finished the season 9–13 (5–9 SEC) and received an at-large bid to the 2021 WNIT, where they lost in the first round and a consolation game.

== Preseason ==
=== SEC media poll ===
The SEC media poll was released on November 17, 2020, with the Tigers selected to finish in tenth place in the SEC.

Media poll
Predicted finish	Team
1	South Carolina
2	Kentucky
3	Texas A&M
4	Arkansas
5	Mississippi State
6	Tennessee
7	LSU
8	Alabama
9	Georgia
10	Missouri
11	Ole Miss
12	Florida
13	Vanderbilt
14	Auburn

=== Preseason All-SEC teams ===
The Tigers had one player selected to the preseason all-SEC teams.

Second team

Aijha Blackwell

== Schedule ==
Date time, TV	Rank^{#}	Opponent^{#}	Result	Record	High points	High rebounds	High assists	Site (attendance) city, state
Non-conference regular season
November 27, 2020*; 6:00 pm, SECN+		North Alabama	W 96–78	1–0	24 – Frank	11 – Frank	5 – Troup	Mizzou Arena (1,248); Columbia, MO
November 29, 2020*; 2:00 pm		at Saint Louis						Chaifetz Arena; St. Louis, MO
December 2, 2020*; 7:00 pm, SECN+		Morehead State						Mizzou Arena; Columbia, MO
December 6, 2020*; 2:00 pm, SECN+		TCU; Big 12/SEC Women's Challenge						Mizzou Arena; Columbia, MO
December 10, 2020*; Noon		at Texas Tech						United Supermarkets Arena; Lubbock, TX
December 13, 2020*; 2:00 pm, SECN+		No. 20 Missouri State	L 58–72	1–1	15 – Williams	7 – Frank	4 – Dickson	Mizzou Arena; Columbia, MO
December 16, 2020*; 7:00 pm, SECN+		New Orleans	W 84–45	2–1	16 – Blackwell	8 – Blackwell	6 – Tied	Mizzou Arena; Columbia, MO
December 19, 2020*; 12:30 pm, SECN+		Oral Roberts	W 88–49	3–1	14 – Williams	8 – Dufficy	5 – Dembele	Mizzou Arena; Columbia, MO
December 20, 2020; 12:30 pm, SECN+		Southern Illinois	W 79–43	4–1	17 – Dickson	10 – Blackwell	4 – Tied	Mizzou Arena (1,757); Columbia, MO
SEC regular season
December 31, 2020; 7:00 pm		Alabama	L 59–74	4–2 (0–1)	15 – Blackwell	12 – Blackwell	5 – Dickson	Mizzou Arena; Columbia, MO
January 3, 2021; 4:00 pm, SECN		at No. 10 Arkansas	L 88–91	4–3 (0–2)	20 – Blackwell	14 – Blackwell	3 – Dembele	Bud Walton Arena; Fayetteville, AR
January 14, 2021; 5:30 pm, ESPN+		at Ole Miss	W 86–77	5–3 (1–2)	23 – Frank	7 – Tied	5 – Tied	The Pavilion at Ole Miss; Oxford, MS
January 18, 2021		LSU	L 64–66	5–4 (1–3)	14 – Blackwell	11 – Blackwell	4 – Dickson	Mizzou Arena; Columbia, MO
January 24, 2021; 4:00 pm, SECN		No. 8 Texas A&M	L 66–70	5–5 (1–4)	20 – Williams	16 – Blackwell	7 – Dickson	Mizzou Arena; Columbia, MO
January 28, 2021; 5:00 pm, SECN+		at Florida	W 61–58	6–5 (2–4)	16 – Williams	16 – Blackwell	3 – Troup	O'Connell Center; Gainesville, FL
January 31, 2021; Noon, SECN		at No. 15 Kentucky	L 55–61	6–6 (2–5)	23 – Williams	19 – Blackwell	3 – Dickson	Memorial Coliseum; Lexington, KY
February 4, 2021; 7:00 pm, SECN+		No. 16 Arkansas	L 80–85	6–7 (2–6)	19 – Hansen	12 – Blackwell	7 – Dickson	Mizzou Arena; Columbia, MO
February 7, 2021; Noon, SECN		at Auburn	W 85–75	7–7 (3–6)	19 – Williams	10 – Blackwell	5 – Troup	Auburn Arena; Auburn, AL
February 11, 2021; 6:00 pm, SECN		at No. 1 South Carolina	L 62–77	7–8 (3–7)	15 – Dickson	10 – Blackwell	3 – Dickson	Colonial Life Arena; Columbia, SC
February 14, 2021; 1:00 pm, SECN		No. 24 Georgia	L 64–82	7–9 (3–8)	17 – Williams	8 – Dickson	4 – Tied	Mizzou Arena (1,848); Columbia, MO
February 18, 2021; 7:00 pm, SECN+		at Texas A&M	Postponed due to weather concerns.					Reed Arena; College Station, TX
February 21, 2021; 1:00 pm, SECN		Florida	W 96–80	8–9 (4–8)	26 – Frank	14 – Blackwell	7 – Dembele	Mizzou Arena; Columbia, MO
February 25, 2021; 7:00 pm, SECN+		No. 20 Tennessee	L 73–78	8–10 (4–9)	16 – Tied	8 – Blackwell	4 – Tied	Mizzou Arena; Columbia, MO
February 28, 2021; 3:00 pm, SECN		at Mississippi State	W 77–57	9–10 (5–9)	16 – Dickson	14 – Blackwell	4 – Blackwell	Humphrey Coliseum; Starkville, MS
SEC Tournament
March 4, 2021; 5:00pm, SECN	(10)	vs. (7) Alabama; Second Round	L 74–82	9–11	28 – Blackwell	12 – Blackwell	8 – Dickson	Bon Secours Wellness Arena (912); Greenville, SC
WNIT
March 19, 2021; 2:00 pm, FloHoops		vs. Fresno State; First Round – Fort Worth Regional	L 75–78	9–12	16 – Blackwell	8 – Tied	5 – Blackwell	Wilkerson–Greines Activity Center (53); Fort Worth, TX
March 20, 2021; 11:00 am, FloHoops		vs. Arizona State; Consolation Game One – Fort Worth Regional	L 39–50	9–13	14 – Troup	9 – Blackwell	3 – Dembele	Wilkerson–Greines Activity Center (26); Fort Worth, TX
*Non-conference game. ^{#}Rankings from AP Poll. (#) Tournament seedings in parentheses. All times are in Central Time.
