= 2020–21 Arkansas Razorbacks women's basketball team =

Intercollegiate basketball season

2020–21 Arkansas Razorbacks women's basketball

NCAA tournament, first round
- Conference: Southeastern Conference

Ranking
- Coaches: No. 18
- AP: No. 15
- Record: 19–9 (9–6 SEC)
- Head coach: Mike Neighbors (4th season)
- Assistant coaches: Todd Schaefer; Pauline Love; Chantel Osahor
- Home arena: Bud Walton Arena

2020–21 SEC women's basketball standings
	Conf.				Overall
Team	W		L	PCT	W		L	PCT
No. 4 Texas A&M	13	–	1	.929	25	–	3	.893
No. 6 South Carolina †	14	–	2	.875	26	–	5	.839
No. 13 Tennessee	9	–	4	.692	17	–	8	.680
No. 10 Georgia	10	–	5	.667	20	–	6	.769
No. 15 Arkansas	9	–	6	.600	19	–	8	.704
No. 18 Kentucky	9	–	6	.600	18	–	8	.692
Alabama	8	–	8	.500	16	–	9	.640
LSU	6	–	8	.429	9	–	13	.409
Mississippi State	5	–	7	.417	10	–	9	.526
Missouri	5	–	9	.357	9	–	13	.409
Ole Miss	4	–	10	.286	15	–	12	.556
Florida	3	–	11	.214	12	–	14	.462
Auburn	0	–	15	.000	5	–	19	.208
Vanderbilt^{%}	0	–	3	.000	4	–	4	.500
† 2021 SEC tournament winner % Vanderbilt suspended their season on January 18, 2021; As of March 21, 2021; Rankings from AP poll

The 2020–21 Arkansas Razorbacks women's basketball team represented the University of Arkansas during the 2020–21 NCAA Division I women's basketball season. The Razorbacks, led by fourth-year head coach Mike Neighbors, played their home games at Bud Walton Arena and competed as members of the Southeastern Conference (SEC).

== Preseason ==
=== SEC media poll ===
The SEC media poll was released on November 17, 2020.

Media poll
Predicted finish	Team
1	South Carolina
2	Kentucky
3	Texas A&M
4	Arkansas
5	Mississippi State
6	Tennessee
7	LSU
8	Alabama
9	Georgia
10	Missouri
11	Ole Miss
12	Florida
13	Vanderbilt
14	Auburn

== Schedule and results ==
The Razorbacks' full schedule was released on November 16, 2020.

Date time, TV	Rank^{#}	Opponent^{#}	Result	Record	High points	High rebounds	High assists	Site (attendance) city, state
Non-conference regular season
November 25, 2020*; 11:00 a.m., SECN+	No. 14	Oral Roberts	W 96–49	1–0	22 – Slocum	13 – Thomas	3 – Tied	Bud Walton Arena (1,428); Fayetteville, AR
November 27, 2020*; 10:30 a.m., FloHoops	No. 14	vs. Wake Forest; Gulf Coast Showcase	W 98–82	2–0	22 – Ramirez	9 – Thomas	5 – Daniels	Alico Arena; Fort Myers, FL
November 28, 2020*; 1:30 p.m., FloHoops	No. 14	at Florida Gulf Coast; Gulf Coast Showcase	W 86–80	3–0	25 – Dungee	10 – Thomas	5 – Slocum	Alico Arena; Fort Myers, FL
November 29, 2020*; 4:30 p.m., FloHoops	No. 14	vs. No. 12 Maryland; Gulf Coast Showcase	L 96–115	3–1	21 – Daniels	5 – Barnum	4 – Slocum	Alico Arena; Fort Myers, FL
December 3, 2020*; 7:00 p.m., SECN	No. 16	Louisiana–Monroe	W 103–50	4–1	18 – Slocum	8 – Tied	4 – Daniels	Bud Walton Arena (1,366); Fayetteville, AR
December 6, 2020*; 5:00 p.m., ESPN2	No. 16	No. 4 Baylor; Big 12/SEC Women's Challenge	W 83–78	5–1	23 – Ramirez	7 – Slocum	2 – Slocum	Bud Walton Arena (2,633); Fayetteville, AR
December 9, 2020*; 7:00 p.m.	No. 13	at SMU	W 79–47	6–1	18 – Ramirez	8 – Tied	7 – Daniels	Moody Coliseum (216); University Park, TX
December 13, 2020*; 2:00 p.m., SECN+	No. 13	Central Arkansas	W 105–58	7–1	26 – Dungee	6 – Barnum	5 – Ramirez	Bud Walton Arena (1,694); Fayetteville, AR
December 19, 2020*; 2:00 p.m., ESPN+	No. 12	at Little Rock	W 80–70	8–1	18 – Dungee	6 – Barnum	4 – Slocum	Jack Stephens Center (1,061); Little Rock, AR
December 21, 2020*; 1:00 p.m., SECN+	No. 11	Arkansas–Pine Bluff	W 86–52	9–1	18 – Slocum	10 – Barnum	3 – Tied	Bud Walton Arena (1,577); Fayetteville, AR
SEC regular season
December 31, 2020; 7:30 p.m., SECN	No. 10	at No. 13 Kentucky	L 64–75	9–2 (0–1)	20 – Dungee	6 – Thomas	6 – Slocum	Memorial Coliseum (1,200); Lexington, KY
January 3, 2021; 4:00 p.m., SECN	No. 10	Missouri	W 91–88	10–2 (1–1)	25 – Dungee	6 – Barnum	3 – Slocum	Bud Walton Arena (1,821); Fayetteville, AR
January 7, 2021; 5:30 p.m., SECN	No. 13	at Tennessee	L 73–88	10–3 (1–2)	30 – Dungee	7 – Dungee	3 – Tied	Thompson–Boling Arena (2,143); Knoxville, TN
January 10, 2021; 3:00 p.m., SECN	No. 13	No. 8 Texas A&M	L 73–74	10–4 (1–3)	21 – Dungee	6 – Thomas	6 – Slocum	Bud Walton Arena (2,192); Fayetteville, AR
January 14, 2021; 7:00 p.m., SECN	No. 17	Florida	W 84–80	11–4 (2–3)	33 – Dungee	8 – Thomas	3 – Dungee	Bud Walton Arena (1,449); Fayetteville, AR
January 18, 2021; 6:00 p.m., ESPN2	No. 15	at No. 4 South Carolina	L 82–104	11–5 (2–4)	22 – Dungee	6 – Thomas	5 – Slocum	Colonial Life Arena (3,500); Columbia, SC
January 25, 2021; 6:00 p.m., SECN	No. 19	at No. 22 Georgia	L 73–75	11–6 (2–5)	25 – Dungee	10 – Thomas	5 – Slocum	Stegeman Coliseum (701); Athens, GA
January 28, 2021*; 4:00 pm, ESPN2	No. 19	No. 3 UConn	W 90–87	12–6	37 – Dungee	7 – Thomas	3 – Tied	Bud Walton Arena (4,400); Fayetteville, AR
January 31, 2021; 2:00 p.m., SECN+	No. 19	Auburn	W 77–67	13–6 (3–5)	19 – Ramirez	9 – Thomas	4 – Mason	Bud Walton Arena (2,133); Fayetteville, AR
February 4, 2021; 7:00 p.m., SECN+	No. 16	at Missouri	W 85–80	14–6 (4–5)	27 – Dungee	7 – Thomas	10 – Slocum	Mizzou Arena (1,718); Columbia, MO
February 7, 2021; 2:00 p.m., SECN	No. 16	at No. 7 Texas A&M	L 67–69	14–7 (4–6)	21 – Ramirez	7 – Dungee	4 – Slocum	Reed Arena (954); College Station, TX
February 11, 2021; 8:00 p.m., SECN	No. 18	Mississippi State	W 86–80	15–7 (5–6)	26 – Slocum	6 – Thomas	4 – Slocum	Bud Walton Arena (1,707); Fayetteville, AR
February 19, 2021; 6:00 p.m.	No. 18	Ole Miss	W 84–74	16–7 (6–6)	38 – Dungee	6 – Mason	4 – Dungee	Bud Walton Arena (1,966); Fayetteville, AR
February 21, 2021; 5:00 p.m., SECN	No. 18	at LSU	W 74–64	17–7 (7–6)	29 – Slocum	7 – Thomas	2 – Tied	Pete Maravich Assembly Center (792); Baton Rouge, LA
February 25, 2021; 8:00 p.m., SECN	No. 16	at Auburn	W 74–69	18–7 (8–6)	16 – Tied	6 – Barnum	4 – Slocum	Auburn Arena (528); Auburn, AL
February 28, 2021; 5:00 p.m., SECN	No. 16	Alabama	W 94–76	19–7 (9–6)	35 – Ramirez	9 – Daniels	3 – Tied	Bud Walton Arena (4,400); Fayetteville, AR
SEC Tournament
March 4, 2021; 7:30 pm, SECN	(6) No. 13	vs. (11) Ole Miss; Second Round	L 60–69	19–8	22 – Dungee	7 – Barnum	4 – Slocum	Bon Secours Wellness Arena (912); Greenville, SC
NCAA tournament
March 22, 2021; 1:00 pm, ESPN	(4 A) No. 15	vs. (13 A) Wright State; First Round	L 62–66	19–9	27 – Dungee	6 – Thomas	2 – Tied	Frank Erwin Center; Austin, TX
*Non-conference game. ^{#}Rankings from AP Poll. (#) Tournament seedings in parentheses. All times are in Central Time.

== Players drafted into the WNBA ==
Round	Pick	Player	Position	WNBA club
1	5	Chelsea Dungee	G	Dallas Wings
2	14	Destiny Slocum	F	Las Vegas Aces

== See also ==
- 2020–21 Arkansas Razorbacks men's basketball team
