= 2020–21 Alabama Crimson Tide women's basketball team =

Intercollegiate basketball season

2020–21 Alabama Crimson Tide women's basketball

NCAA tournament, second round
- Conference: Southeastern Conference
- Record: 17–10 (8–8 SEC)
- Head coach: Kristy Curry (8th season)
- Assistant coaches: Tiffany Coppage; Kelly Curry; Janese Constantine
- Home arena: Coleman Coliseum

2020–21 SEC women's basketball standings
	Conf.				Overall
Team	W		L	PCT	W		L	PCT
No. 4 Texas A&M	13	–	1	.929	25	–	3	.893
No. 6 South Carolina †	14	–	2	.875	26	–	5	.839
No. 13 Tennessee	9	–	4	.692	17	–	8	.680
No. 10 Georgia	10	–	5	.667	20	–	6	.769
No. 15 Arkansas	9	–	6	.600	19	–	8	.704
No. 18 Kentucky	9	–	6	.600	18	–	8	.692
Alabama	8	–	8	.500	16	–	9	.640
LSU	6	–	8	.429	9	–	13	.409
Mississippi State	5	–	7	.417	10	–	9	.526
Missouri	5	–	9	.357	9	–	13	.409
Ole Miss	4	–	10	.286	15	–	12	.556
Florida	3	–	11	.214	12	–	14	.462
Auburn	0	–	15	.000	5	–	19	.208
Vanderbilt^{%}	0	–	3	.000	4	–	4	.500
† 2021 SEC tournament winner % Vanderbilt suspended their season on January 18, 2021; As of March 21, 2021; Rankings from AP poll

The 2020–21 Alabama Crimson Tide women's basketball team represented the University of Alabama during the 2020–21 NCAA Division I women's basketball season. The Crimson Tide, led by eighth-year head coach Kristy Curry, played their home games at Coleman Coliseum and competed as members of the Southeastern Conference (SEC).

In the December 16 win against Nicholls State, senior Jasmine Walker scored her 1,000th career point, making her the 30th in the program to do so.

The Crimson Tide ended their season at 17–10 (8–8 SEC), receiving an at-large bid to the NCAA tournament, losing in the second round to Maryland.

== Departures ==
Name	Number	Pos.	Height	Year	Hometown	Notes
Amber Richardson	2	G	6'0"	RS Senior	Garner, NC	Graduated
Cierra Johnson	4	G	5'10"	Senior	Mobile, AL	Graduated
Ashley Knight	25	F	6'5"	Senior	Austin, TX	Graduated
Shelby Gibson	42	C	6'3"	RS Junior	Murfreesboro, TN	Medically Retired

== Roster ==
2020–21 Alabama Crimson Tide women's basketball team
Players
Coaches

Pos.	#	Name	Height	Year	Previous school	Hometown
G	0	Ahriahna Grizzle	5 ft 9 in (1.75 m)	So	Bill Crothers Secondary School	Toronto, Canada
G	1	Megan Abrams	5 ft 9 in (1.75 m)	Jr	Lafayette Christian Academy	Lafayette, LA
G	2	Keyara Jones	6 ft 0 in (1.83 m)	Jr	Jones County CC	Heidelberg, MS
G	3	Jordan Lewis	5 ft 7 in (1.7 m)	RS Sr	Lake Highland Prep	Windermere, FL
G	4	Taylor Sutton	5 ft 10 in (1.78 m)	Jr	Middle Tennessee State	Atlanta, GA
G	5	Hannah Barber	5 ft 6 in (1.68 m)	Jr	Homewood HS	Homewood, AL
G	11	Destiny Rice	5 ft 8 in (1.73 m)	So	North Caddo Magnet HS	Shreveport, LA
F	12	Allie Craig Cruce	6 ft 1 in (1.85 m)	Jr	Lauderdale County HS	Killen, AL
G/F	15	Myra Gordon	6 ft 0 in (1.83 m)	Fr	Lobell HS	Fort Worth, TX
C	20	Ruth Koang	6 ft 5 in (1.96 m)	Jr	South Plains College	Rochester, NY
F	22	Ariyah Copeland	6 ft 3 in (1.91 m)	Sr	Columbus HS	Columbus, GA
G	23	Brittany Davis	5 ft 9 in (1.75 m)	Jr	Gulf Coast State College	Manchester, GA
G	24	De'sha Benjamin	6 ft 0 in (1.83 m)	Jr	Lucy Craft Laney HS	Augusta, GA
F	32	Alana Busby-Dunphy	6 ft 3 in (1.91 m)	So	Dodge City CC	Eureka, CA
F	40	Jasmine Walker	6 ft 3 in (1.91 m)	Sr	Jefferson Davis HS	Montgomery, AL

Head coach

- Kristy Curry (Louisiana–Monroe)

Assistant coach(es)

- Tiffany Coppage (Missouri State)
- Kelly Curry (Texas A&M)
- Janese Constantine (Wisconsin)

Legend

- (C) Team captain
- (S) Suspended
- (I) Ineligible
- (W) Walk-on
- Injured
- Current redshirt

Roster
Last update: November 21, 2020

== Preseason ==
=== SEC media poll ===
The SEC media poll was released on November 17, 2020.

Media poll
Predicted finish	Team
1	South Carolina
2	Kentucky
3	Texas A&M
4	Arkansas
5	Mississippi State
6	Tennessee
7	LSU
8	Alabama
9	Georgia
10	Missouri
11	Ole Miss
12	Florida
13	Vanderbilt
14	Auburn

== Schedule ==
Date time, TV	Rank^{#}	Opponent^{#}	Result	Record	High points	High rebounds	High assists	Site (attendance) city, state
Non-conference regular season
November 25, 2020; 12:00 pm, SECN+		Samford	W 83–68	1–0	22 – Walker	7 – Walker	6 – Lewis	Coleman Coliseum (538); Tuscaloosa, AL
November 29, 2020; 2:00 pm, SECN+		Houston	W 88–66	2–0	25 – Walker	14 – Copeland	4 – Abrams	Coleman Coliseum (469); Tuscaloosa, AL
December 2, 2020; 6:00 pm, SECN+		USC Upstate	W 98–59	3–0	24 – Copeland	13 – Walker	5 – Abrams	Coleman Coliseum (460); Tuscaloosa, AL
December 5, 2020; 2:30 pm, ESPN+		at Oklahoma State; Big 12/SEC Women's Challenge	W 76–72	4–0	24 – Walker	10 – Copeland	6 – Abrams	Gallagher-Iba Arena (898); Stillwater, OK
December 9, 2020; 2:00 pm		Sam Houston State	Canceled due to COVID-19					Coleman Coliseum; Tuscaloosa, AL
December 13, 2020; 1:00 pm, ESPN+		at Mercer	W 78–61	5–0	26 – Copeland	12 – Walker	5 – Tied	Hawkins Arena (248); Macon, GA
December 16, 2020; 8:00 pm, SECN		Nicholls	W 86–46	6–0	21 – Walker	11 – Walker	7 – Barber	Coleman Coliseum (447); Tuscaloosa, AL
December 17, 2020; 8:00 pm, SECN		Southern Miss						Coleman Coliseum; Tuscaloosa, AL
December 19, 2020; 3:30 pm, ESPN+		at Memphis	W 74–68	7–0	28 – Walker	10 – Walker	5 – Barber	Elma Roane Fieldhouse (174); Memphis, TN
December 21, 2020*; 2:00 pm, SECN+		Jacksonville						Coleman Coliseum; Tuscaloosa, AL
SEC regular season
December 31, 2020; 2:00 pm, SECN+		at Missouri	W 74–59	8–0 (1–0)	27 – Lewis	9 – Abrams	6 – Barber	Mizzou Arena (1,723); Columbia, MO
January 4, 2021; 6:00 pm		No. 5 South Carolina	L 60–77	8–1 (1–1)	28 – Lewis	8 – Walker	4 – Lewis	Coleman Coliseum (637); Tuscaloosa, AL
January 7, 2021; 6:00 pm		LSU	W 67–59	9–1 (2–1)	20 – Copeland	14 – Copeland	5 – Lewis	Coleman Coliseum (571); Tuscaloosa, AL
January 10, 2021; 1:00 pm, SECN		at Vanderbilt	W 80–56	10–1 (3–1)	25 – Walker	16 – Walker	6 – Lewis	Memorial Gymnasium (55); Nashville, TN
January 14, 2021; 7:00 pm, SECN+		at No. 14 Mississippi State	W 86–78	11–1 (4–1)	22 – Lewis	13 – Copeland	6 – Barber	Humphrey Coliseum (1,000); Starkville, MS
January 17, 2021; 2:00 pm, SECN+		No. 23 Tennessee	L 56–82	11–2 (4–2)	22 – Lewis	12 – Walker	2 – Lewis	Coleman Coliseum (914); Tuscaloosa, AL
January 24, 2021; 1:00 pm, ESPNU		Auburn	W 67–55	12–2 (5–2)	19 – Tied	9 – Walker	8 – Lewis	Coleman Coliseum (922); Tuscaloosa, AL
January 28, 2021; 5:30 pm, SECN		at No. 15 Kentucky	L 68–81	12–3 (5–3)	27 – Walker	11 – Walker	7 – Lewis	Memorial Coliseum (1,533); Lexington, KY
January 31, 2021; 2:00 pm, SECN		at No. 4 South Carolina	L 63–87	12–4 (5–4)	19 – Lewis	7 – Copeland	2 – Tied	Colonial Life Arena (3,500); Columbia, SC
February 4, 2021; 6:00 pm, SECN		No. 25 Georgia	L 76–83 ^{OT}	12–5 (5–5)	24 – Walker	14 – Copeland	5 – Lewis	Coleman Coliseum (771); Tuscaloosa, AL
February 11, 2021; 6:00 pm, SECN+		Ole Miss	L 62–67	12–6 (5–6)	17 – Lewis	11 – Lewis	2 – Tied	Coleman Coliseum (633); Tuscaloosa, AL
February 14, 2021; 5:00 pm, SECN		at Auburn	W 92–78	13–6 (6–6)	41 – Walker	15 – Walker	11 – Barber	Auburn Arena (841); Auburn, AL
February 18, 2021; 4:00 pm, SECN		at Florida	W 77–70	14–6 (7–6)	22 – Walker	9 – Abrams	5 – Lewis	O'Connell Center (674); Gainesville, FL
February 21, 2021; 2:00 pm, SEC+		Mississippi State	W 71–63	15–6 (8–6)	20 – Walker	11 – Copeland	7 – Abrams	Coleman Coliseum (876); Tuscaloosa, AL
February 25, 2021; 6:00 pm, SECN+		No. 3 Texas A&M	L 67–73	15–7 (8–7)	21 – Lewis	11 – Walker	5 – Lewis	Coleman Coliseum (648); Tuscaloosa, AL
February 28, 2021; 5:00 pm, SECN		at No. 16 Arkansas	L 76–94	15–8 (8–8)	18 – Copeland	13 – Copeland	3 – Tied	Bud Walton Arena (4,400); Fayetteville, AR
SEC Tournament
March 4, 2021; 5:00 pm, SECN	(7)	vs. (10) Missouri; Second Round	W 82–74	16–8	22 – Copeland	10 – Copeland	7 – Barber	Bon Secours Wellness Arena (912); Greenville, SC
March 5, 2021; 5:00 pm, SECN	(7)	vs. (2) No. 7 South Carolina; Quarterfinals	L 63–75	16–9	25 – Lewis	7 – Copeland	4 – Lewis	Bon Secours Wellness Arena (2,049); Greenville, SC
NCAA tournament
March 22, 2021; 11:00 am, ESPN	(7 H)	vs. (10 H) North Carolina; First Round	W 80–71	17–9	32 – Lewis	12 – Copeland	8 – Lewis	Alamodome; San Antonio, TX
March 24, 2021; 12:00 pm, ESPN2	(7 H)	vs. (2 H) No. 7 Maryland; Second Round	L 64–100	17–10	23 – Walker	7 – Tied	3 – Tied	Bill Greehey Arena; San Antonio, TX
*Non-conference game. ^{#}Rankings from AP Poll. (#) Tournament seedings in parentheses. All times are in Central Time.
