= 2020–21 Mississippi State Bulldogs women's basketball team =

Intercollegiate basketball season

2020–21 Mississippi State Bulldogs women's basketball
- Conference: Southeastern Conference
- Record: 10–9 (5–7 SEC)
- Head coach: Nikki McCray-Penson (1st season)
- Assistant coaches: Keith Freeman; Scepter Brownlee; Brittany Young
- Home arena: Humphrey Coliseum

2020–21 SEC women's basketball standings
	Conf.				Overall
Team	W		L	PCT	W		L	PCT
No. 4 Texas A&M	13	–	1	.929	25	–	3	.893
No. 6 South Carolina †	14	–	2	.875	26	–	5	.839
No. 13 Tennessee	9	–	4	.692	17	–	8	.680
No. 10 Georgia	10	–	5	.667	20	–	6	.769
No. 15 Arkansas	9	–	6	.600	19	–	8	.704
No. 18 Kentucky	9	–	6	.600	18	–	8	.692
Alabama	8	–	8	.500	16	–	9	.640
LSU	6	–	8	.429	9	–	13	.409
Mississippi State	5	–	7	.417	10	–	9	.526
Missouri	5	–	9	.357	9	–	13	.409
Ole Miss	4	–	10	.286	15	–	12	.556
Florida	3	–	11	.214	12	–	14	.462
Auburn	0	–	15	.000	5	–	19	.208
Vanderbilt^{%}	0	–	3	.000	4	–	4	.500
† 2021 SEC tournament winner % Vanderbilt suspended their season on January 18, 2021; As of March 21, 2021; Rankings from AP poll

The 2020–21 Mississippi State Bulldogs women's basketball team represented Mississippi State University during the 2020–21 NCAA Division I women's basketball season. The Bulldogs, led by first-year head coach Nikki McCray-Penson, played their home games at Humphrey Coliseum and competed as members of the Southeastern Conference (SEC).

== Previous season ==
The Bulldogs finished the season with a 27–6 overall record and a 13–3 record in conference play. The Bulldogs lost to South Carolina in the Championship of the SEC tournament. Head coach Vic Schaefer resigned following the season to become head coach at Texas. Old Dominion head coach Nikki McCray-Penson was hired to replace him.

== Offseason ==
=== Departures ===
Mississippi State Departures
Name	Number	Pos.	Height	Year	Hometown	Notes
Jayla Hemingway	00	G	5'11"	Freshman	Collierville, TN	Transferred to West Virginia.
Andra Espinoza-Hunter	2	G	5'11"	Junior	Ossining, NY	Transferred to Seton Hall.
Promise Taylor	13	G	6'5"	Sophomore	Issaquah, WA	Retired from basketball.
Bre'Amber Scott	23	G	5'11"	Junior	Little Rock, AR	Transferred to Little Rock.
Jordan Danberry	24	G	5'11"	Senior	Conway, AR	Graduated.
Chloe Bibby	55	F	6'1"	Junior	Warracknabeal, Australia	Transferred to Maryland.

=== 2020 recruiting class ===
College recruiting information
Name	Hometown	School	Height	Weight	Commit date
Madison Hayes #7 G	Chattanooga, TN	East Hamilton High School	6 ft 0 in (1.83 m)	N/A	
Madison Hayes #7 G	Recruit ratings: ESPN: (97)				
Charlotte Kohl; C	Giessen, Germany	Theo Koch Schule	6 ft 5 in (1.96 m)	N/A	
Charlotte Kohl; C	Recruit ratings: No ratings found				
Overall recruit ranking:
Note: In many cases, Scout, Rivals, 247Sports, On3, and ESPN may conflict in their listings of height and weight.; In these cases, the average was taken. ESPN grades are on a 100-point scale.; Sources:

=== Incoming transfers ===
Mississippi State Bulldogs incoming transfers
Name	Number	Pos.	Height	Year	Hometown	Previous school
Caterrion Thompson	23	G	5'11"	RS Senior	Lima, OH	Bowling Green

== Preseason ==
=== SEC media poll ===
The SEC media poll was released on November 17, 2020, with the Bulldogs selected to finish in fifth place in the SEC.

Media poll
Predicted finish	Team
1	South Carolina
2	Kentucky
3	Texas A&M
4	Arkansas
5	Mississippi State
6	Tennessee
7	LSU
8	Alabama
9	Georgia
10	Missouri
11	Ole Miss
12	Florida
13	Vanderbilt
14	Auburn

=== Preseason All-SEC teams ===
The Bulldogs had two players selected to the preseason all-SEC teams.

First team

Rickea Jackson

Second team

Jessika Carter

== Roster ==
2020–21 Mississippi State Bulldogs women's basketball team
Players
Coaches

Pos.	#	Name	Height	Year	Previous school	Hometown
G	0	JaMya Mingo-Young	5 ft 8 in (1.73 m)	So	Loranger HS	Bogalusa, LA
G	1	Myah Taylor	5 ft 7 in (1.7 m)	RS Jr	Olive Branch HS	Olive Branch, MS
G	3	Aliyah Matharu	5 ft 7 in (1.7 m)	So	Bishop McNamara HS	Washington, D.C.
F/C	4	Jessika Carter	6 ft 5 in (1.96 m)	Jr	Harris County HS	Waverly Hall, GA
F	5	Rickea Jackson	6 ft 2 in (1.88 m)	So	Detroit Edison Public School Academy	Detroit, MI
F/C	10	Sidney Cooks	6 ft 4 in (1.93 m)	RS Jr	St. Joseph Catholic Academy; Michigan State	Kenosha, WI
G	11	Xaria Wiggins	6 ft 1 in (1.85 m)	Jr	Princess Anne HS	Virginia Beach, VA
C	20	Yemiyah Morris	6 ft 6 in (1.98 m)	Sr	Canyon Springs HS; Cochise College	San Bernardino, CA
G	21	Madison Hayes	6 ft 0 in (1.83 m)	Fr	East Hamilton HS	Chattanooga, TN
C	22	Charlotte Kohl	6 ft 5 in (1.96 m)	Fr	Theo Koch Schule	Giessen, Germany
G	23	Caterrion Thompson	5 ft 11 in (1.8 m)	RS Sr	Lima Senior HS; Bowling Green	Lima, OH

Head coach

- Nikki McCray-Penson (Tennessee)

Assistant coach(es)

- Keith Freeman (Huntington)
- Scepter Brownlee (San Francisco)
- Brittany Young (Francis Marion)

Legend

- (C) Team captain
- (S) Suspended
- (I) Ineligible
- (W) Walk-on
- Injured
- Current redshirt

Roster

== Schedule ==
Date time, TV	Rank^{#}	Opponent^{#}	Result	Record	High points	High rebounds	High assists	Site (attendance) city, state
Non-conference regular season
November 28, 2020*; 9:00 am	No. 6	vs. Maine; Hall of Fame Challenge	Canceled due to COVID-19					Mohegan Sun Arena; Uncasville, CT
November 29, 2020*; 4:00 pm	No. 6	Jackson State	W 88–58	1–0	19 – Jackson	9 – Mingo–Young	7 – Taylor	Humphrey Coliseum; Starkville, MS
December 2, 2020*	No. 6	New Orleans	W 106–51	2–0	23 – Carter	10 – Carter	5 – Tied	Humphrey Coliseum; Starkville, MS
December 5, 2020*; 6:00 pm, ESPN+	No. 6	at South Florida	L 63–67 ^{OT}	2–1	18 – Jackson	9 – Tied	1 – Tied	Yuengling Center; Tampa, FL
December 12, 2020*	No. 12	at Southern Miss	Canceled due to COVID-19					Reed Green Coliseum; Hattiesburg, MS
December 14, 2020*; 7:00 pm, SECN+	No. 13	Troy	W 103–76	3–1	30 – Jackson	7 – Tied	9 – Tied	Humphrey Coliseum; Starkville, MS
December 18, 2020*; 7:00 pm, SECN+	No. 13	Southern	W 79–55	4–1	17 – Carter	11 – Carter	6 – Mingo-Young	Humphrey Coliseum; Starkville, MS
December 20, 2020*; 3:00 pm, SECN	No. 13	Central Arkansas	W 72–48	5–1	29 – Carter	15 – Carter	4 – Tied	Humphrey Coliseum (1,000); Starkville, MS
SEC regular season
December 31, 2020; 6:00 pm, SECN+	No. 12	at Georgia	W 69–62	6–1 (1–0)	13 – Tied	6 – Cooks	6 – Mingo-Young	Stegeman Coliseum; Athens, GA
January 3, 2021; 1:00 pm, ESPN2	No. 12	No. 13 Kentucky	L 86–92 ^{OT}	6–2 (1–1)	23 – Jackson	13 – Carter	4 – Matharu	Humphrey Coliseum; Starkville, MS
January 7, 2021; 5:00 pm, SECN+	No. 14	at Florida	W 68–56	7–2 (2–1)	25 – Carter	15 – Carter	4 – Jackson	O'Connell Center; Gainesville, FL
January 10, 2021; 5:00 pm, SECN	No. 14	Ole Miss	W 60–56	8–2 (3–1)	19 – Carter	9 – Carter	8 – Taylor	Humphrey Coliseum; Starkville, MS
January 14, 2021; 7:00 pm, SECN+	No. 14	Alabama	L 78–86	8–3 (3–2)	15 – Tied	9 – Carter	6 – Taylor	Humphrey Coliseum; Starkville, MS
January 17, 2021; Noon, ESPN2	No. 14	at No. 7 Texas A&M	L 41–69	8–4 (3–3)	14 – Taylor	8 – Tied	3 – Hayes	Reed Arena; College Station, TX
January 28, 2021; 6:00 pm, ESPN	No. 21	No. 4 South Carolina	L 52–75	8–5 (3–4)	15 – Jackson	10 – Carter	5 – Taylor	Humphrey Coliseum; Starkville, MS
February 1, 2021; 6:00 pm, SECN		at Vanderbilt	Canceled due to Vanderbilt ending season					Memorial Gymnasium; Nashville, TN
February 11, 2021; 8:00 pm, SECN		at No. 18 Arkansas	L 80–86	8–6 (3–5)	22 – Taylor	7 – Jackson	7 – Taylor	Bud Walton Arena; Fayetteville, AR
February 14, 2021; 3:00 pm, SECN		at Ole Miss	Postponed due to winter weather.					The Pavilion at Ole Miss; Oxford, MS
February 16, 2021; 4:00 pm, ESPNU		Tennessee	Postponed due to winter weather.					Humphrey Coliseum; Starkville, MS
February 21, 2021; 2:00 pm, SECN+		at Alabama	L 63–71	8–7 (3–6)	18 – Jackson	12 – Carter	2 – Tied	Coleman Coliseum; Tuscaloosa, AL
February 23, 2021; 5:00 pm, SECN		Auburn	W 81–68	9–7 (4–6)	20 – Jackson	9 – Jackson	5 – Taylor	Humphrey Coliseum; Starkville, MS
February 25, 2021; 6:00 pm, SECN+		at LSU	W 68–59	10–7 (5–6)	19 – Matharu	9 – Carter	4 – Taylor	Pete Maravich Assembly Center; Baton Rouge, LA
February 28, 2021; 3:00 pm, SECN		Missouri	L 57–77	10–8 (5–7)	11 – Taylor	6 – Matharu	3 – Cooks	Humphrey Coliseum; Starkville, MS
SEC Tournament
March 4, 2021; 10:00 am, SECN	(9)	vs. (8) LSU; Second Round	L 62–71	10–9	14 – Tied	8 – Mingo-Young	3 – Taylor	Bon Secours Wellness Arena; Greenville, SC
*Non-conference game. ^{#}Rankings from AP Poll. (#) Tournament seedings in parentheses. All times are in Central Time.

== See also ==
- 2020–21 Mississippi State Bulldogs men's basketball team
