= 2020–21 Ole Miss Rebels women's basketball team =

Intercollegiate basketball season

2020–21 Ole Miss Rebels women's basketball

WNIT, Runner-up
- Conference: Southeastern Conference
- Record: 15–12 (4–10 SEC)
- Head coach: Yolett McPhee-McCuin (3rd season)
- Assistant coaches: Chris Ayers; Armintie Herrington; Shay Robinson
- Home arena: The Pavilion at Ole Miss

2020–21 SEC women's basketball standings
	Conf.				Overall
Team	W		L	PCT	W		L	PCT
No. 4 Texas A&M	13	–	1	.929	25	–	3	.893
No. 6 South Carolina †	14	–	2	.875	26	–	5	.839
No. 13 Tennessee	9	–	4	.692	17	–	8	.680
No. 10 Georgia	10	–	5	.667	20	–	6	.769
No. 15 Arkansas	9	–	6	.600	19	–	8	.704
No. 18 Kentucky	9	–	6	.600	18	–	8	.692
Alabama	8	–	8	.500	16	–	9	.640
LSU	6	–	8	.429	9	–	13	.409
Mississippi State	5	–	7	.417	10	–	9	.526
Missouri	5	–	9	.357	9	–	13	.409
Ole Miss	4	–	10	.286	15	–	12	.556
Florida	3	–	11	.214	12	–	14	.462
Auburn	0	–	15	.000	5	–	19	.208
Vanderbilt^{%}	0	–	3	.000	4	–	4	.500
† 2021 SEC tournament winner % Vanderbilt suspended their season on January 18, 2021; As of March 21, 2021; Rankings from AP poll

The 2020–21 Ole Miss Rebels women's basketball team represented the University of Mississippi during the 2020–21 NCAA Division I women's basketball season. The Rebels, led by third-year head coach Yolett McPhee-McCuin, played their home games at The Pavilion at Ole Miss and competed as members of the Southeastern Conference (SEC). The Rebels finished the season 15–12 (4–10 SEC) and received an at-large bid to the Women's National Invitation Tournament, where they lost to Rice in the championship game.

== Previous season ==
The Rebels finished the season with a 7–23 overall record and a 0–16 record in conference play. The Rebels lost to Missouri in the First Round of the SEC tournament. The Rebels were not invited to the postseason.

== Offseason ==
=== Departures ===
Ole Miss Departures
Name	Number	Pos.	Height	Year	Hometown	Notes
Dominique Banks	13	F	6'5"	Junior	Atlanta, GA	Transferred to South Carolina State
Jayla Alexander	20	G	5'9"	Freshman	Pearl, MS	Transferred to Jones County JC
Bryn Parker	25	G	6'0"	Freshman	Scottsdale, AZ	Transferred to Dixie State
Deja Cage	31	G	5'8"	RS Junior	Chicago, IL	Graduate transferred to Middle Tennessee
Torri Lewis	44	G	5'11"	RS Senior	Olive Branch, MS	Graduated

=== 2020 recruiting class ===
College recruiting information
Name	Hometown	School	Height	Weight	Commit date
Madison Scott #2 W	Indian Head, MD	Bishop McNamara High School	6 ft 1 in (1.85 m)	N/A	
Madison Scott #2 W	Recruit ratings: ESPN: (98)				
Jacorriah Bracey #11 G	Drew, MS	Thomas E. Edwards, Sr. High School	5 ft 10 in (1.78 m)	N/A	
Jacorriah Bracey #11 G	Recruit ratings: ESPN: (96)				
Aleah Sorrentino #16 F	Palm Bay, FL	Florida Preparatory Academy	6 ft 3 in (1.91 m)	N/A	
Aleah Sorrentino #16 F	Recruit ratings: ESPN: (94)				
Snudda Collins; F	Brookhaven, MS	Brookhaven High School	6 ft 1 in (1.85 m)	N/A	
Snudda Collins; F	Recruit ratings: ESPN: (90)				
Caitlin McGee; F	Jacksonville, FL	Sandalwood High School	6 ft 1 in (1.85 m)	N/A	
Caitlin McGee; F	Recruit ratings: ESPN: (90)				
Overall recruit ranking: ESPN: 13
Note: In many cases, Scout, Rivals, 247Sports, On3, and ESPN may conflict in their listings of height and weight.; In these cases, the average was taken. ESPN grades are on a 100-point scale.; Sources:

=== Incoming transfers ===
Ole Miss incoming transfers
Name	Number	Pos.	Height	Year	Hometown	Previous school
Shakira Austin	0	F	6'5"	Junior	Fredericksburg, VA	Maryland
Tiya Douglas	25	G	5'9"	Sophomore	Fort Smith, AR	Trinity Valley CC

=== Offseason impact ===
The 2020 offseason was a strong one for third-year head coach Yolett McPhee-McCuin. Following the end of the 2019–20 season, Coach "Yo" added assistant coach Shay Robinson from Maryland following NCAA Tournament appearances in each of his six seasons with the Terrapins, including a Final Four appearance in 2015. The Rebels 2020 recruiting class was ranked 13th by ESPN. Following the recruiting class, the Rebels added two instant impact transfers. Tiya Douglas, a sophomore from Trinity Valley Community College in Texas, broke the TVCC single-game record and tied the NJCAA record with 13 three-pointers in a 44-point performance in her freshman season. Following Coach Robinson, Junior Shakira Austin transferred to Ole Miss from Maryland. At Maryland, Austin broke the school's single-season blocks record with 89 her freshman season. She was also on the 2019 All-Big Ten Freshman and Defensive Teams and 2020 All-Big Ten Second Team. Coming out of high school, Austin was a McDonald's All-American and ranked as the #4 overall prospect in the 2018 class. Austin will join freshman signees Jacorriah Bracey and Madison Scott as the third five-star prospect on the Rebels' roster. Austin will also join freshman signee Madison Scott as the first two McDonald's All-Americans in Ole Miss history.

== Preseason ==
=== SEC media poll ===
The SEC media poll was released on November 17, 2020 with the Rebels selected to finish in eleventh place in the SEC.

Media poll
Predicted finish	Team
1	South Carolina
2	Kentucky
3	Texas A&M
4	Arkansas
5	Mississippi State
6	Tennessee
7	LSU
8	Alabama
9	Georgia
10	Missouri
11	Ole Miss
12	Florida
13	Vanderbilt
14	Auburn

=== Preseason All-SEC teams ===
The Rebels had one player selected to the preseason all-SEC teams.

Second team

Shakira Austin

== Roster ==
2020–21 Ole Miss Rebels women's basketball team
Players
Coaches

Pos.	#	Name	Height	Year	Previous school	Hometown
F	0	Shakira Austin	6 ft 5 in (1.96 m)	Jr	Riverdale Baptist School; Maryland	Fredericksburg, VA
G	1	Sarah Dumitrescu (injured)	6 ft 0 in (1.83 m)	RS Fr	IMG Academy	Bucharest, Romania
G	2	Mimi Reid	5 ft 8 in (1.73 m)	RS Jr	The Patrick School	Bronx, NY
G	3	Donnetta Johnson	5 ft 11 in (1.8 m)	RS So	Baldwin HS; Georgia	Queens, NY
G	4	Valerie Nesbitt	5 ft 8 in (1.73 m)	Sr	Chipola College	Nassau, Bahamas
F	5	Snudda Collins	6 ft 1 in (1.85 m)	Fr	Brookhaven HS	Brookhaven, MS
G	12	Jordan Berry	5 ft 7 in (1.7 m)	So	Mount Carmel Academy	New Orleans, LA
F	15	Caitlin McGee	6 ft 1 in (1.85 m)	RS Fr	Sandalwood HS	Jacksonville, FL
G	21	Taylor Smith	5 ft 8 in (1.73 m)	Jr	Marietta HS	Marietta, GA
F	22	Aleah Sorrentino (redshirt)	6 ft 3 in (1.91 m)	Fr	Florida Preparatory Academy	Palm Bay, FL
G	23	Jacorriah Bracey	6 ft 1 in (1.85 m)	Fr	Thomas E. Edwards, Sr. HS	Drew, MS
F	24	Madison Scott	6 ft 1 in (1.85 m)	Fr	Bishop McNamara HS	Indian Head, MD
G	25	Tiya Douglas	5 ft 9 in (1.75 m)	So	Northside HS; Trinity Valley CC	Fort Smith, AR
F	32	Iyanla Kitchens	6 ft 2 in (1.88 m)	Jr	Arabia Mountain HS	Lithonia, GA
C	40	Andeija Puckett (injured)	6 ft 2 in (1.88 m)	RS Jr	Griffin HS; Cincinnati	Griffin, GA

Head coach

- Yolett McPhee-McCuin (Rhode Island)

Assistant coach(es)

- Chris Ayers (Florida A&M)
- Armintie Herrington (Mississippi)
- Shay Robinson (Central Florida)

Legend

- (C) Team captain
- (S) Suspended
- (I) Ineligible
- (W) Walk-on
- Injured
- Current redshirt

Roster

== Schedule ==
Date time, TV	Rank^{#}	Opponent^{#}	Result	Record	High points	High rebounds	High assists	Site (attendance) city, state
Non-conference regular season
November 25, 2020*; 6:00 pm, SECN+		Northwestern State	Canceled due to COVID-19					The Pavilion at Ole Miss; Oxford, MS
November 30, 2020*; 6:00 pm, SECN+		McNeese State	W 99–44	1–0	23 – Collins	6 – Tied	9 – Reid	The Pavilion at Ole Miss (834); Oxford, MS
December 3, 2020*; 7:30 pm, SECN		Kansas; Big 12/SEC Women's Challenge	W 70–53	2–0	21 – Johnson	10 – Scott	4 – Tied	The Pavilion at Ole Miss (840); Oxford, MS
December 8, 2020*; 6:00 pm, SECN+		Alcorn State	W 104–48	3–0	15 – Collins	7 – Tied	6 – Nesbitt	The Pavilion at Ole Miss (850); Oxford, MS
December 12, 2020*; 1:00 pm, SECN+		Mississippi Valley State	W 86–46	4–0	19 – Austin	8 – Scott	7 – Reid	The Pavilion at Ole Miss (888); Oxford, MS
December 15, 2020*; 6:00 pm, SECN+		Jackson State	W 89–65	5–0	22 – Austin	12 – Austin	6 – Johnson	The Pavilion at Ole Miss; Oxford, MS
December 19, 2020*; 11:00 am, CBSSN		at George Mason	W 64–34	6–0	24 – Austin	9 – Scott	3 – Reid	EagleBank Arena; Fairfax, VA
December 21, 2020*; 6:00 pm, SECN+		Jacksonville State	Canceled due to COVID-19					The Pavilion at Ole Miss; Oxford, MS
SEC regular season
January 4, 2021; 3:00 pm, SECN+		LSU	L 69–77 ^{OT}	6–1 (0–1)	20 – Austin	7 – Kitchens	10 – Reid	The Pavilion at Ole Miss; Oxford, MS
January 7, 2021; 6:00 pm, SECN+		Auburn	W 62–58	7–1 (1–1)	25 – Austin	10 – Austin	6 – Tied	The Pavilion at Ole Miss; Oxford, MS
January 10, 2021; 5:00 pm, SECN		at No. 14 Mississippi State	L 56–60	7–2 (1–2)	25 – Johnson	11 – Austin	3 – Nesbitt	Humphrey Coliseum; Starkville, MS
January 14, 2021; 6:00 pm, SECN+		Missouri	L 77–86	7–3 (1–3)	26 – Austin	10 – Austin	9 – Reid	The Pavilion at Ole Miss; Oxford, MS
January 17, 2021; 2:00 pm, SECN		at Georgia	L 57–73	7–4 (1–4)	13 – Austin	6 – Austin	3 – Nesbitt	Stegeman Coliseum; Athens, GA
January 24, 2021; 2:00 p, SECN+		Florida	L 68–78	7–5 (1–5)	18 – Nesbitt	7 – Austin	7 – Nesbitt	The Pavilion at Ole Miss; Oxford, MS
January 28, 2021; 6:00 pm, SECN+		at No. 20 Tennessee	L 67–68	7–6 (1–6)	19 – Johnson	6 – Austin	4 – Nesbitt	Thompson–Boling Arena; Knoxville, TN
January 31, 2021; 1:00 pm, SECN+		at LSU	L 66–75 ^{OT}	7–7 (1–7)	18 – Johnson	16 – Scott	3 – Nesbitt	Pete Maravich Assembly Center; Baton Rouge, LA
February 4, 2021; 6:00 pm, SECN+		No. 15 Kentucky	W 72–60	8–7 (2–7)	21 – Austin	12 – Austin	4 – Tied	The Pavilion at Ole Miss; Oxford, MS
February 11, 2021; 6:00 pm, SECN+		at Alabama	W 67–62	9–7 (3–7)	25 – Austin	13 – Austin	4 – Johnson	Coleman Coliseum; Tuscaloosa, AL
February 14, 2021; 3:00 pm, SECN		Mississippi State	Canceled due to winter storm.					The Pavilion at Ole Miss; Oxford, MS
February 19, 2021; 6:00 pm		at No. 18 Arkansas	L 74–84	9–8 (3–8)	17 – Tied	11 – Austin	2 – Tied	Bud Walton Arena; Fayetteville, AR
February 21, 2021; 3:00 pm, SECN		No. 5 Texas A&M	L 55–66	9–9 (3–9)	16 – Austin	10 – Austin	7 – Reid	The Pavilion at Ole Miss; Oxford, MS
February 25, 2021; Noon, SECN+		at No. 5 South Carolina	L 43–68	9–10 (3–10)	22 – Austin	8 – Johnson	5 – Reid	Colonial Life Arena; Columbia, SC
February 28, 2021; 11:00 am, SECN		at No. 19 Kentucky	W 73–69	10–10 (4–10)	22 – Austin	12 – Austin	5 – Nesbitt	Memorial Coliseum; Lexington, KY
SEC Tournament
March 4, 2021; 7:30 pm, SECN	(11)	vs. (6) No. 13 Arkansas; Second Round	W 69–60	11–10	29 – Austin	13 – Austin	3 – Tied	Bon Secours Wellness Arena (912); Greenville, SC
March 5, 2021; 7:30 pm, SECN	(11)	vs. (3) No. 14 Tennessee; Quarterfinals	L 72–77	11–11	20 – Johnson	7 – Austin	9 – Reid	Bon Secours Wellness Arena; Greenville, SC
WNIT
March 19, 2021; 5:00 pm, FloHoops		vs. Samford; First Round – Memphis Regional	W 64–45	12–11	23 – Austin	12 – Austin	7 – Reid	My Town Movers Fieldhouse; Collierville, TN
March 20, 2021; 8:00 pm, FloHoops		vs. Tulane; Second Round – Memphis Regional	W 72–61	13–11	24 – Austin	13 – Austin	5 – Reid	My Town Movers Fieldhouse; Collierville, TN
March 22, 2021; 7:00 pm, FloHoops		vs. Colorado; Quarterfinals – Memphis Regional	W 65–56	14–11	15 – Johnson	12 – Scott	4 – Reid	My Town Movers Fieldhouse; Collierville, TN
March 26, 2021; 7:00 pm, FloHoops		vs. Northern Iowa; Semifinals	W 60–50	15–11	18 – Austin	11 – Scott	6 – Reid	My Town Movers Fieldhouse; Collierville, TN
March 28, 2021; 1:00 pm, FloHoops		vs. Rice; Championship Game	L 58–71	15–12	25 – Austin	9 – Tied	4 – Nesbitt	My Town Movers Fieldhouse; Collierville, TN
*Non-conference game. ^{#}Rankings from AP Poll. (#) Tournament seedings in parentheses. All times are in Central Time.

== See also ==
- 2020–21 Ole Miss Rebels men's basketball team
