= Providence Christian Academy (Murfreesboro, Tennessee) =

Location
- 410 Dejarnette Ln; Murfreesboro, Tennessee 37130; United States; 35.886194°N 86.371253°W

Information
- Type: Private Christian
- Religious affiliation: Non-denominational Christian
- Established: 1997
- Head of School: Dr. Andrew Sheets
- Staff: Head of Rhetoric School- Robert Scherrei, Head of Logic School- Trina Shelton, Head of Lower School- Libra Lukasick
- Grades: Pre-K-12
- Gender: coeducational
- Enrollment: 793
- Average class size: 17
- Student to teacher ratio: 1:17
- Campus size: 37 acres (150,000 m^{2})
- Campus type: suburban
- Colours: Navy and Gold
- Slogan: "Esse Quam Videri"
- Athletics conference: TSSAA
- Mascot: Lion
- Website: Providence Christian Academy

Providence Christian Academy (PCA) is an inter-denominational Pre-K – 12th grade independent classical school in Murfreesboro, Tennessee. Providence Christian Academy offers a classical education with a Christian worldview. The school opened in 1997. It is a member of Tennessee Association of Independent Schools and Southern Association of Independent Schools.
