= 2020–21 Troy Trojans women's basketball team =

Intercollegiate basketball season

2020–21 Troy Trojans women's basketball

Sun Belt East Division champions Sun Belt Tournament champions

NCAA tournament, first round
- Conference: Sun Belt Conference
- Record: 22–6 (15–2 Sun Belt)
- Head coach: Chanda Rigby (9th season)
- Assistant coaches: Jennifer Graf; Courtney Simmons; Neil Harrow
- Home arena: Trojan Arena

2020–21 Sun Belt Conference women's basketball standings
	Conf.				Overall
Team	W		L	PCT	W		L	PCT
East
Troy †	15	–	2	.882	22	–	6	.786
Georgia State	9	–	7	.563	13	–	11	.542
Appalachian State	10	–	8	.556	15	–	12	.556
South Alabama	9	–	9	.500	13	–	13	.500
Georgia Southern	5	–	9	.357	11	–	13	.458
Coastal Carolina	0	–	13	.000	3	–	15	.167
West
Louisiana	13	–	1	.929	16	–	7	.696
UT Arlington	11	–	4	.733	13	–	7	.650
Little Rock	9	–	7	.563	15	–	11	.577
Texas State	7	–	8	.467	11	–	11	.500
Arkansas State	4	–	10	.286	9	–	12	.429
Louisiana–Monroe	1	–	15	.063	2	–	20	.091
† 2021 Sun Belt tournament winner

The 2020–21 Troy Trojans women's basketball team represented Troy University during the 2020–21 NCAA Division I women's basketball season. The basketball team, led by ninth-year head coach Chanda Rigby, played all home games at the Trojan Arena along with the Troy Trojans men's basketball team. They were members of the Sun Belt Conference.

As East Division champs, the Trojans entered the Sun Belt Tournament as the No. 1 seed from the East. Defeating Louisiana in the finals of the tournament, the Trojans captured their first Sun Belt Tournament title since 2017.

== Previous season ==
The Trojans finished the 2019–20 season 25–4, 16–2 in Sun Belt play to finish conference regular season champions. They made it to the 2019-20 Sun Belt Conference women's basketball tournament where they received a first round bye and were scheduled to play Louisiana in the Quarterfinals. However, before the game could commence, the remainder of the tournament as well as all postseason play was cancelled due to the COVID-19 pandemic.

== Offseason ==
=== Departures ===
Name	Number	Pos.	Height	Year	Hometown	Notes
Kayla Robinson	1	G	5'5"	Senior	Savannah, Georgia	Graduated
Shawnta Shaw	2	G/F	5'2"	Sophomore	Nashville, Tennessee	Transfer to Jacksonville State
Jasmine LeBlanc	11	G	5'10"	Senior	Breaux Bridge, Louisiana	Graduated
Harriet Winchester	12	G	5'11"	Senior	Safford, Alabama	Graduated
Japonica James	20	F	5'11"	Senior	Mobile, Alabama	Graduated
Kate Rodgers	32	F	6'2"	Senior	Birmingham, Alabama	Graduated
Amber Rivers	40	F	6'2"	Senior	Birmingham, Alabama	Graduated

=== Transfers ===
Name	Number	Pos.	Height	Year	Hometown	Old School
Dominique Camp	1	G	5'9"	Sophomore	Dayton, Ohio	Sinclair CC
Felmas Koranga	2	F	6'1"	Junior	Nakuru, Kenya	Tyler JC
Agustina Talasimov	3	F	6'1"	Sophomore	Lloret de Mar, Spain	Jefferson College

=== Recruiting ===
College recruiting information
Name	Hometown	School	Height	Weight	Commit date
Janiah Ellis; Guard	Thomasville, GA	Colquitt County HS	5 ft 9 in (1.75 m)	N/A	Sep 14, 2019
Janiah Ellis; Guard	Recruit ratings: No ratings found				
Samira Moore; Forward	Troy, AL	Charles Henderson HS	6 ft 0 in (1.83 m)	N/A	Jun 14, 2019
Samira Moore; Forward	Recruit ratings: No ratings found				
Sharonica Hartsfield; Guard	Oklahoma City, OK	Charles Henderson HS	5 ft 5 in (1.65 m)	N/A	Sep 1, 2019
Sharonica Hartsfield; Guard	Recruit ratings: No ratings found				
Jelissa Reese; Guard	Cordele, GA	Americus Sumter HS	5 ft 9 in (1.75 m)	N/A	Sep 14, 2019
Jelissa Reese; Guard	Recruit ratings: No ratings found				
Kennedi White; Forward	Powder Springs, GA	Hillgrove HS	6 ft 1 in (1.85 m)	N/A	Sep 14, 2019
Kennedi White; Forward	Recruit ratings: No ratings found				
Overall recruit ranking:
Note: In many cases, Scout, Rivals, 247Sports, On3, and ESPN may conflict in their listings of height and weight.; In these cases, the average was taken. ESPN grades are on a 100-point scale.; Sources: "Troy 2020-21 Basketball Commits". ESPN.; "2020-21 Team Ranking". Rivals.com.

== Roster ==
2020–21 Troy Trojans women's basketball team
Players
Coaches

Pos.	#	Name	Height	Year	Previous school	Hometown
G	0	Emely Rosario	5 ft 6 in (1.68 m)	Sr	Marist HS; Kilgore College	Bronx, NY
G	1	Dominique Camp	5 ft 9 in (1.75 m)	So	Lakota West HS; Sinclair CC	Dayton, OH
F	2	Felmas Koranga	6 ft 1 in (1.85 m)	Jr	Tyler JC	Nakuru, Kenya
F	3	Agustina Talasimov	5 ft 9 in (1.75 m)	So	Jefferson College	Lloret de Mar, Spain
G	4	Jasmine Robinson	5 ft 6 in (1.68 m)	Sr	Richmond County HS	Augusta, GA
F	5	Tyasia Moore	6 ft 0 in (1.83 m)	Sr	Forestville Military Academy; Trinity Valley CC	Washington, D.C.
G	10	Janiah Sandifer	5 ft 7 in (1.7 m)	Sr	Pearl–Cohn HS	Nashville, TN
G	11	Janiah Ellis	5 ft 9 in (1.75 m)	Fr	Colquitt County HS	Thomasville, GA
G	14	Tiyah Johnson	5 ft 10 in (1.78 m)	Sr	Central HS; Shelton State CC	Phenix City, AL
F	15	Samira Moore	6 ft 0 in (1.83 m)	Fr	Charles Henderson HS	Troy, AL
F	21	Jhileiya Dunlap	6 ft 2 in (1.88 m)	Sr	Dreher HS; Ole Miss	Columbia, SC
G	22	Sharonica Hartsfield	5 ft 5 in (1.65 m)	Fr	Putnam City West HS	Oklahoma City, OK
G	23	Jelissa Reese	5 ft 9 in (1.75 m)	Fr	Americus Sumter HS	Cordele, GA
F	24	Kennedi White	6 ft 1 in (1.85 m)	Fr	Hillgrove HS	Powder Springs, GA
F	25	Alexus Dye	6 ft 0 in (1.83 m)	Sr	Wenonah HS; Gulf Coast SC	Birmingham, AL

Head coach

- Chanda Rigby (Nova Southeastern)

Assistant coach(es)

- Jennifer Graf (Northwestern State)
- Courtney Simmons (Louisville)
- Neil Harrow (West–Scotland)

Legend

- (C) Team captain
- (S) Suspended
- (I) Ineligible
- (W) Walk-on
- Injured
- Current redshirt

Roster

== Schedule and results ==
Date time, TV	Rank^{#}	Opponent^{#}	Result	Record	High points	High rebounds	High assists	Site city, state
Non-conference Regular Season
11/27/2020*; 6:00 p.m.		vs. Southeastern Louisiana; Lady Eagle Thanksgiving Classic	W 81–69	1–0	19 – Johnson	12 – Dye	8 – Rosario	Reed Green Coliseum; Hattiesburg, MS
11/28/2020*; 2:00 p.m.		vs. Alabama A&M; Lady Eagles Thanksgiving Classic	L 69–80	1–1	17 – Robinson	12 – Dye	4 – Rosario	Reed Green Coliseum; Hattiesburg, MS
12/07/2020*; 6:00 p.m.		LaGrange College	W 131–57	2–1	30 – Johnson	9 – Johnson	6 – Hartsfield	Trojan Arena (751); Troy, AL
12/09/2020*; 12:00 p.m.		Chattanooga	W 95–74	3–1	19 – Johnson	14 – Dye	10 – Hartsfield	Trojan Arena (773); Troy, AL
12/14/2020*; 7:00 p.m., SECN+		at No. 13 Mississippi State	L 76–103	3–2	20 – Dye	11 – Dye	4 – Rosario	Humphrey Coliseum (1,000); Starkville, MS
12/17/2020*; 6:30 p.m.		at Middle Tennessee	L 76–92	3–3	30 – Dye	10 – Dye	5 – Hartsfield	Murphy Center (100); Murfreesboro, TN
12/20/2020*; 6:00 p.m., ESPN+		Martin Methodist	W 90–71	4–3	19 – Sandifer	11 – Koranga	5 – Robinson	Trojan Arena (767); Troy, AL
Conference regular season
01/01/2021; 6:00 p.m., ESPN+		Appalachian State	L 66–78	4–4 (0–1)	15 – Dye	9 – Koranga	3 – Rosario	Trojan Arena (752); Troy, AL
01/02/2021; 4:00 p.m., ESPN+		Appalachian State	W 85–65	5–4 (1–1)	22 – Moore	14 – Koranga	5 – Hartsfield	Trojan Arena (773); Troy, AL
01/15/2021; 6:00 p.m., ESPN+		Georgia Southern	W 87–70	6–4 (2–1)	17 – Dye	12 – Dye	6 – Hartsfield	Trojan Arena (891); Troy, AL
01/16/2021; 4:00 p.m., ESPN+		Georgia Southern	W 82–69	7–4 (3–1)	16 – Robinson	16 – Dye	3 – Rosario	Trojan Arena (822); Troy, AL
01/22/2021; 6:00 p.m., ESPN+		Coastal Carolina	W 104–59	8–4 (4–1)	24 – Johnson	13 – Dye	6 – Robinson	Trojan Arena (877); Troy, AL
01/23/2021; 4:00 p.m., ESPN+		Coastal Carolina	W 84–53	9–4 (5–1)	15 – Koranga	14 – Dye	4 – Rosario	Trojan Arena (846); Troy, AL
01/29/2021; 5:00 p.m., ESPN+		at Appalachian State	W 80–60	10–4 (6–1)	17 – Johnson	11 – Dye	4 – Robinson	Holmes Center (50); Boone, NC
01/30/2021; 3:00 p.m., ESPN+		at Appalachian State	W 74–52	11–4 (7–1)	14 – Johnson	20 – Dye	3 – Robinson	Holmes Center (50); Boone, NC
02/05/2021; 5:00 p.m., ESPN+		at Georgia Southern	L 91–96	11–5 (7–2)	33 – Robinson	15 – Koranga	4 – Sandifer	Hanner Fieldhouse (188); Statesboro, GA
02/06/2021; 3:00 p.m., ESPN+		at Georgia Southern	W 92–83	12–5 (8–2)	21 – Sandifer	19 – Dye	5 – Robinson	Hanner Fieldhouse (433); Statesboro, GA
02/11/2021; 6:00 p.m., ESPN+		South Alabama	W 85–45	13–5 (9–2)	21 – Johnson	11 – Dye	5 – Robinson	Trojan Arena (1,187); Troy, AL
02/13/2021; 4:00 p.m., ESPN+		at South Alabama	W 84–77	14–5 (10–2)	17 – Dye	18 – Dye	5 – Robinson	Mitchell Center (508); Mobile, AL
02/16/2021; 2:00 p.m., ESPN+		at Georgia State	W 91–70	15–5 (11–2)	20 – Moore	10 – Moore	6 – Hartsfield	GSU Sports Arena (391); Atlanta, GA
02/19/2021; 6:00 p.m., ESPN+		Georgia State	W 79–60	16–5 (12–2)	15 – Robinson	15 – Dye	6 – Robinson	Trojan Arena (846); Troy, AL
02/20/2021; 4:00 p.m., ESPN+		Georgia State	W 84–78	17–5 (13–2)	18 – Robinson	15 – Dye	5 – Robinson	Trojan Arena (902); Troy, AL
02/26/2021; 5:00 p.m., ESPN+		at Coastal Carolina	W 97–82	18–5 (14–2)	23 – Dye	12 – Dye	6 – Hartsfield	HTC Center (113); Conway, SC
02/27/2021; 3:00 p.m., ESPN+		at Coastal Carolina	W 103–89	19–5 (15–2)	21 – Johnson	19 – Koranga	10 – Robinson	HTC Center (84); Conway, SC
Sun Belt Tournament
03/06/2021; 11:00 am, ESPN+	(E1)	vs. (W4) Texas State; Quarterfinals	W 103–90	20–5	37 – Dye	19 – Koranga	9 – Robinson	Pensacola Bay Center; Pensacola, FL
03/07/2021; 11:00 am, ESPN+	(E1)	vs. (E3) Appalachian State; Semifinals	W 66–63	21–5	20 – Dye	13 – Dye	3 – Rosario	Pensacola Bay Center; Pensacola, FL
03/08/2021; 1:00 pm, ESPNU	(E1)	vs. (W1) Louisiana; Finals	W 73–65	22–5	17 – Robinson	22 – Koranga	9 – Robinson	Pensacola Bay Center; Pensacola, FL
NCAA tournament
03/22/2021; 5:00 pm, ESPN2	(15)	vs. (2) No. 4 Texas A&M; First Round	L 80–84	22–6	26 – Dye	11 – Tied	5 – Robinson	Frank Erwin Center; Austin, TX
*Non-conference game. ^{#}Rankings from AP Poll. (#) Tournament seedings in parentheses. All times are in Central Time.

== See also ==
- 2020–21 Troy Trojans men's basketball team
