= 2020–21 Texas State Bobcats women's basketball team =

Intercollegiate basketball season

2020–21 Texas State Bobcats women's basketball
- Conference: Sun Belt Conference
- Record: 11–11 (7–8 Sun Belt)
- Head coach: Zenarae Antoine (10th season)
- Assistant coaches: Nathan Teymer; Jericka Jenkins; Deidra Johnson
- Home arena: Strahan Arena

2020–21 Sun Belt Conference women's basketball standings
	Conf.				Overall
Team	W		L	PCT	W		L	PCT
East
Troy †	15	–	2	.882	22	–	6	.786
Georgia State	9	–	7	.563	13	–	11	.542
Appalachian State	10	–	8	.556	15	–	12	.556
South Alabama	9	–	9	.500	13	–	13	.500
Georgia Southern	5	–	9	.357	11	–	13	.458
Coastal Carolina	0	–	13	.000	3	–	15	.167
West
Louisiana	13	–	1	.929	16	–	7	.696
UT Arlington	11	–	4	.733	13	–	7	.650
Little Rock	9	–	7	.563	15	–	11	.577
Texas State	7	–	8	.467	11	–	11	.500
Arkansas State	4	–	10	.286	9	–	12	.429
Louisiana–Monroe	1	–	15	.063	2	–	20	.091
† 2021 Sun Belt tournament winner

The 2020–21 Texas State Bobcats women's basketball team represented Texas State University during the 2020–21 NCAA Division I women's basketball season. The basketball team, led by tenth-year head coach Zenarae Antoine, played all home games at the Strahan Arena in San Marcos, Texas, along with the Texas State Bobcats men's basketball team. They were members of the Sun Belt Conference.

== Previous season ==
The Bobcats finished the 2019–20 season 13–17, 6–12 in Sun Belt play, to finish tenth in the conference. They made it to the 2019–20 Sun Belt Conference women's basketball tournament where they were defeated by UT Arlington in the first round. Following the season, all conference tournaments as well as all postseason play was cancelled due to the COVID-19 pandemic.

== Offseason ==
=== Departures ===
Name	Number	Pos.	Height	Year	Hometown	Notes
Jayla Johnson	00	F	6' 1"	Junior	Dallas, TX	Transferred to Eastern Kentucky
Brooke Holle	24	G	5' 7"	Senior	Austin, TX	Graduated
Bailey Holle	33	G	5' 7"	Senior	Austin, TX	Graduated

=== Transfers ===
Name	Number	Pos.	Height	Year	Hometown	Previous school
Tianna Eaton	23	G	5' 10"	Redshirt junior	Walnut, CA	UC Riverside
Gabby Standifer	33	F/G	5' 11"	Graduate student	The Colony, TX	Fresno State

=== Recruiting ===
College recruiting information
Name	Hometown	School	Height	Weight	Commit date
Presley Bennett; Guard	Austin, TX	Westlake HS	5 ft 7 in (1.70 m)	N/A	Jun 20, 2019
Presley Bennett; Guard	Recruit ratings: No ratings found				
Sierra Dickson; Guard	Carrollton, TX	Hebron HS	5 ft 7 in (1.70 m)	N/A	Jul 5, 2019
Sierra Dickson; Guard	Recruit ratings: No ratings found				
Nicole Leff; Forward	Cedar Park, TX	Cedar Park HS	6 ft 1 in (1.85 m)	N/A	
Nicole Leff; Forward	Recruit ratings: No ratings found				
Overall recruit ranking:
Note: In many cases, Scout, Rivals, 247Sports, On3, and ESPN may conflict in their listings of height and weight.; In these cases, the average was taken. ESPN grades are on a 100-point scale.; Sources: "Texas State 2020-21 Basketball Commits". ESPN.; "2020-21 Team Ranking". Rivals.com.

== Roster ==
2020–21 Texas State Bobcats women's basketball team
Players
Coaches

Pos.	#	Name	Height	Year	Previous school	Hometown
G	1	Avionne Alexander	5 ft 8 in (1.73 m)	Sr	Sunnyvale HS	Sunnyvale, TX
G	2	Presley Bennett	5 ft 7 in (1.7 m)	Fr	Westlake HS	Austin, TX
G	3	Kennedy Taylor	5 ft 3 in (1.6 m)	Jr	Lincoln HS	Dallas, TX
G	4	Sierra Dickson	5 ft 7 in (1.7 m)	Fr	Hebron HS	Carrollton, TX
G	5	Jessica Paz y Puente	5 ft 9 in (1.75 m)	So	Tom C. Clark HS	San Antonio, TX
G	13	Keslyn King	5 ft 8 in (1.73 m)	So	Mansfield HS	Burleson, TX
G	15	Ja'Kayla King	5 ft 8 in (1.73 m)	Jr	Robert E. Lee HS	Tyler, TX
F	20	Chelsea Johnson	6 ft 1 in (1.85 m)	So	Loyola College Prep	Shreveport, LA
G	23	Tianna Easton	5 ft 10 in (1.78 m)	RS Jr	Rowland HS; UC Riverside	Walnut, CA
F	25	Lauryn Thompson	6 ft 1 in (1.85 m)	RS So	Mansfield Timberview HS; VCU	Arlington, TX
F	32	Da'Nasia Hood	6 ft 1 in (1.85 m)	Jr	Wagner HS	San Antonio, TX
G/F	33	Gabby Standifer	5 ft 11 in (1.8 m)	Sr	Argyle HS	The Colony, TX
F	40	Nicole Leff	6 ft 1 in (1.85 m)	Fr	Cedar Park HS	Cedar Park, TX
C	55	Jaeda Reed	6 ft 1 in (1.85 m)	Jr	Eisenhower HS	Lawton, OK

Head coach

- Zenarae Antoine (Ohio)

Assistant coach(es)

- Nathan Teymer (Georgia Southwestern State)
- Jericka Jenkins (Texas State)
- Deidra Johnson (Oklahoma State)

Legend

- (C) Team captain
- (S) Suspended
- (I) Ineligible
- (W) Walk-on
- Injured
- Current redshirt

Roster
Last update: October 21, 2024

== Schedule and results ==
Date time, TV	Rank^{#}	Opponent^{#}	Result	Record	High points	High rebounds	High assists	Site city, state
Non-conference regular season
November 28, 2020*; 12:00 p.m.		at New Orleans	L 64–67	0–1	16 – Hood	12 – Hood	4 – Taylor	Lakefront Arena (337); New Orleans, LA
December 3, 2020*; 7:00 p.m., ESPN+		at SMU	W 74–70 ^{OT}	1–1	25 – Hood	9 – Hood	4 – Taylor	Moody Coliseum (324); University Park, TX
December 13, 2020*; 2:00 p.m., FSOK		at Oklahoma	L 40–52	1–2	18 – Hood	10 – Thompson	2 – Alexander	Lloyd Noble Center (597); Norman, OK
December 16, 2020*; 7:00 p.m.		at Texas A&M–Corpus Christi	W 56–46	2–2	14 – Taylor	12 – Thompson	8 – Taylor	Dugan Wellness Center (141); Corpus Christi, TX
December 19, 2020*; 4:00 p.m., ESPN+		Lamar	W 69–53	3–2	22 – Hood	9 – Thompson	4 – Alexander	Strahan Arena (571); San Marcos, TX
Conference regular season
January 1, 2021; 4:00 p.m., ESPN+		Louisiana	W 71–63	4–2 (1–0)	25 – Thompson	8 – Thompson	9 – Taylor	Strahan Arena (576); San Marcos, TX
January 2, 2021; 4:00 p.m., ESPN+		Louisiana	L 41–67	4–3 (1–1)	10 – Taylor	9 – Hood	4 – Taylor	Strahan Arena (549); San Marcos, TX
January 8, 2021; 6:00 p.m., ESPN+		at Arkansas State	L 53–54	4–4 (1–2)	11 – Taylor	8 – Hood	5 – Taylor	First National Bank Arena (218); Jonesboro, AR
January 9, 2021; 4:00 p.m., ESPN+		at Arkansas State	L 54–70	4–5 (1–3)	15 – Thompson	9 – Taylor	4 – Alexander	First National Bank Arena (303); Jonesboro, AR
January 22, 2021; 4:00 p.m., ESPN+		Louisiana–Monroe	W 74–52	5–5 (2–3)	23 – Hood	9 – Bowie	6 – Alexander	Strahan Arena (559); San Marcos, TX
January 23, 2021; 4:00 p.m., ESPN+		Louisiana–Monroe	W 64–50	6–5 (3–3)	23 – Thompson	11 – Thompson	12 – Taylor	Strahan Arena (532); San Marcos, TX
January 29, 2021; 6:00 p.m., ESPN+		at Louisiana	L 64–66	6–6 (3–4)	17 – Hood	8 – Hood	8 – Taylor	Cajundome (114); Lafayette, LA
January 30, 2021; 4:00 p.m., ESPN+		at Louisiana	L 60–66	6–7 (3–5)	18 – Hood	8 – Hood	7 – Taylor	Cajundome (151); Lafayette, LA
February 2, 2021; 6:00 p.m., ESPN+		Little Rock	W 51–44	7–7 (4–5)	16 – Hood	12 – Thompson	4 – Taylor	Strahan Arena (503); San Marcos, TX
February 5, 2021; 6:30 p.m., ESPN+		at Little Rock	L 51–62	7–8 (4–6)	12 – Hood	5 – King	2 – Taylor	Jack Stephens Center (292); Little Rock, AR
February 6, 2021; 4:00 p.m., ESPN+		at Little Rock	L 49–63	7–9 (4–7)	14 – Bowie	7 – Bowie	6 – Taylor	Jack Stephens Center (305); Little Rock, AR
February 12, 2021; 2:00 p.m., ESPN+		UT Arlington	W 66–45	8–9 (5–7)	25 – Hood	9 – Bowie	8 – Taylor	Strahan Arena (502); San Marcos, TX
February 13, 2021; 2:00 p.m., ESPN+		at UT Arlington	L 43–51	8–10 (5–8)	10 – Taylor	9 – Thompson	3 – Taylor	College Park Center (624); Arlington, TX
February 19, 2021; 4:00 p.m., ESPN+		Arkansas State	Cancelled due to weather concerns					Strahan Arena; San Marcos, TX
February 20, 2021; 4:00 p.m., ESPN+		Arkansas State	Cancelled due to weather concerns					Strahan Arena; San Marcos, TX
February 26, 2021; 6:00 p.m., ESPN+		at Louisiana–Monroe	W 85–62	9–10 (6–8)	13 – Thompson	7 – Thompson	5 – Alexander	Fant–Ewing Coliseum; Monroe, LA
February 27, 2021; 4:00 p.m., ESPN+		at Louisiana–Monroe	W 68–56	10–10 (7–8)	20 – Taylor	7 – Bowie	4 – Alexander	Fant–Ewing Coliseum (654); Monroe, LA
Sun Belt tournament
March 5, 2021; 11:30 am, ESPN+	(W4)	vs. (E5) Georgia Southern; First round	W 94–61	11–10	19 – Bowie	5 – Eaton	8 – Alexander	Hartsell Arena (200); Pensacola, FL
March 6, 2021; 11:00 am, ESPN+	(W4)	vs. (E1) Troy; Quarterfinals	L 90–103	11–11	28 – Taylor	6 – Alexander	5 – Taylor	Pensacola Bay Center; Pensacola, FL
*Non-conference game. ^{#}Rankings from AP poll. (#) Tournament seedings in parentheses. All times are in Central.

== See also ==
- 2020–21 Texas State Bobcats men's basketball team
