= 2020–21 Georgia Southern Eagles women's basketball team =

Intercollegiate basketball season

2020–21 Georgia Southern Eagles women's basketball
- Conference: Sun Belt Conference
- Record: 11–13 (5–9 Sun Belt)
- Head coach: Anita Howard (2nd season)
- Assistant coaches: Deont'a McChester; Coretta Brown; Chris Straker
- Home arena: Hanner Fieldhouse

2020–21 Sun Belt Conference women's basketball standings
	Conf.				Overall
Team	W		L	PCT	W		L	PCT
East
Troy †	15	–	2	.882	22	–	6	.786
Georgia State	9	–	7	.563	13	–	11	.542
Appalachian State	10	–	8	.556	15	–	12	.556
South Alabama	9	–	9	.500	13	–	13	.500
Georgia Southern	5	–	9	.357	11	–	13	.458
Coastal Carolina	0	–	13	.000	3	–	15	.167
West
Louisiana	13	–	1	.929	16	–	7	.696
UT Arlington	11	–	4	.733	13	–	7	.650
Little Rock	9	–	7	.563	15	–	11	.577
Texas State	7	–	8	.467	11	–	11	.500
Arkansas State	4	–	10	.286	9	–	12	.429
Louisiana–Monroe	1	–	15	.063	2	–	20	.091
† 2021 Sun Belt tournament winner

The 2020–21 Georgia Southern Eagles women's basketball team represented Georgia Southern University during the 2020–21 NCAA Division I women's basketball season. The basketball team, led by first-year head coach Anita Howard, played all home games at the Hanner Fieldhouse along with the Georgia Southern Eagles men's basketball team. They were members of the Sun Belt Conference.

== Previous season ==
The Eagles finished the 2019–20 season 10–20, 7–11 in Sun Belt play to finish ninth place in the conference. They made it to the 2019-20 Sun Belt Conference women's basketball tournament where they were defeated by Louisiana in the First Round. Shortly after their elimination, the remainder of the tournament as well as all postseason play was cancelled due to the COVID-19 pandemic.

== Offseason ==
=== Departures ===
Name	Number	Pos.	Height	Year	Hometown	Notes
Alexis Brown	4	G	5'6"	Senior	Madison, Georgia	Graduated
Nakol Franks	13	G/F	5'7"	Senior	Greenville, South Carolina	Graduated
Lola Lovitt	14	G	5'10"	Redshirt Freshman	Wilmington, North Carolina	Transferred to Young Harris
Amira Atwater	15	G	5'6"	Senior	Douglasville, Georgia	Graduated
Nikki McDonald	25	G	6'0"	Graduate Student	Atlanta, Georgia	Graduated
Hailey Dias–Allen	32	F	6'2"	Senior	Greensboro, North Carolina	Graduated
Victoria Stavropoulos	33	F	6'0"	Senior	Orland Park, Illinois	Graduated
La'Tia Fils–Aime'	44	F	6'1"	Redshirt Junior	Daleville, Alabama	Retired

=== Transfers ===
Name	Number	Pos.	Height	Year	Hometown	Old School
A'Tyanna Gaulden	0	G	5'7"	Senior	Ocilla, Georgia	Arkansas
Shondell Vickers	30	F	6'2"	Sophomore	Waycross, Georgia	Florida Southwestern State

=== Recruiting ===
College recruiting information
Name	Hometown	School	Height	Weight	Commit date
Daeja Holmes; Guard	Fresno, CA	Herbert Hoover HS	5 ft 9 in (1.75 m)	N/A	May 1, 2020
Daeja Holmes; Guard	Recruit ratings: No ratings found				
Terren Ward; Guard/forward	Jesup, GA	Wayne County HS	5 ft 11 in (1.80 m)	N/A	Apr 21, 2020
Terren Ward; Guard/forward	Recruit ratings: No ratings found				
Lacy Robins; Guard	Statesboro, GA	Statesboro HS	6 ft 0 in (1.83 m)	N/A	Sep 13, 2019
Lacy Robins; Guard	Recruit ratings: No ratings found				
Simone James; Guard/forward	San Diego, CA	Christian HS	5 ft 10 in (1.78 m)	N/A	Oct 2, 2019
Simone James; Guard/forward	Recruit ratings: No ratings found				
Lydia Freeman; Center	Atlanta, GA	Westlake HS	6 ft 5 in (1.96 m)	N/A	Sep 29, 2019
Lydia Freeman; Center	Recruit ratings: No ratings found				
Overall recruit ranking:
Note: In many cases, Scout, Rivals, 247Sports, On3, and ESPN may conflict in their listings of height and weight.; In these cases, the average was taken. ESPN grades are on a 100-point scale.; Sources: "Georgia Southern 2020-21 Basketball Commits". ESPN.; "2020-21 Team Ranking". Rivals.com.

== Roster ==
2020–21 Georgia Southern Eagles women's basketball team
Players
Coaches

Pos.	#	Name	Height	Year	Previous school	Hometown
G	0	A'Tyanna Gaulden	5 ft 7 in (1.7 m)	Sr	Americus Sumter HS; Arkansas	Ocilla, GA
G	1	Jordan Strange	5 ft 7 in (1.7 m)	Jr	AC Flora HS	Columbia, SC
G	2	Daeja Holmes	5 ft 9 in (1.75 m)	Fr	Herbert Hoover HS	Fresno, CA
G/F	3	Terren Ward	5 ft 11 in (1.8 m)	Fr	Wayne County HS	Jesup, GA
F	5	Tsubasa Nisbet	6 ft 0 in (1.83 m)	Jr	Burnside HS	Christchurch, New Zealand
G	10	Mya Burns	6 ft 0 in (1.83 m)	So	North Augusta HS	North Augusta, SC
G	11	Lacy Robins	6 ft 0 in (1.83 m)	Fr	Statesboro HS	Statesboro, GA
G	12	Jaiden Hamilton	5 ft 9 in (1.75 m)	So	Laney HS	Augusta, GA
G	22	Ja'Nya Love–Hill	5 ft 6 in (1.68 m)	So	Carver HS	Columbus, GA
G	23	Tatum Barber	5 ft 10 in (1.78 m)	Sr	Liberty Christian	Dallas, TX
F	30	Shondell Vickers	6 ft 2 in (1.88 m)	So	Ware County HS; Florida Southwestern State	Waycross, GA
G/F	33	Simone James	5 ft 10 in (1.78 m)	Fr	Christian HS	San Diego, CA
F	41	Eden Johnson	6 ft 2 in (1.88 m)	RS Fr	Haines City HS; Fordham	Kissimmee, FL
F/C	42	Sarah Moore	6 ft 1 in (1.85 m)	Sr	Middleton HS	Tampa, FL
C	55	Lydia Freeman	6 ft 5 in (1.96 m)	Fr	Westlake HS	Atlanta, GA

Head coach

- Anita Howard (Armstrong State)

Assistant coach(es)

- Deont'a McChester (Tennessee State)
- Coretta Brown (North Carolina)
- Chris Straker (San Diego State)

Legend

- (C) Team captain
- (S) Suspended
- (I) Ineligible
- (W) Walk-on
- Injured
- Current redshirt

Roster
Last update: 9 December 2020

== Schedule and results ==
Date time, TV	Rank^{#}	Opponent^{#}	Result	Record	High points	High rebounds	High assists	Site city, state
Non-conference Regular Season
11/25/2020*; 3:00 p.m., ESPN+		at Jacksonville State	L 58–70	0–1	25 – Gaulden	12 – Vickers	3 – Gaulden	Pete Mathews Coliseum (256); Jacksonville, AL
12/28/2020*; 6:00 p.m.		at Augusta	W 76–63	1–1	13 – Vickers	13 – Vickers	4 – Love–Hill	Christenberry Fieldhouse (50); Augusta, GA
12/03/2020*; 6:00 p.m., ESPN+		Furman	L 58–73	1–2	10 – Gaulden	4 – Gaulden	5 – Holmes	Hanner Fieldhouse (151); Statesboro, GA
12/12/2020*; 12:00 p.m., ESPN+		Coastal Georgia	W 118–48	2–2	15 – James	12 – Vickers	4 – Ward	Hanner Fieldhouse (125); Stateboro, GA
12/18/2020*; 12:00 p.m., ESPN+		Georgia Southwestern	W 90–69	3–2	12 – Gaulden	9 – Ward	2 – Vickers	Hanner Fieldhouse (107); Stateboro, GA
12/20/2020*; 3:00 p.m.		vs. Chattanooga; Georgia State Holiday Classic	L 87–96	3–3	16 – Hamilton	8 – Ward	4 – Gaulden	GSU Sports Arena (381); Atlanta, GA
12/21/2020*; 1:00 p.m.		vs. Western Carolina; Georgia State Holiday Classic	W 89–61	4–3	19 – Gaulden	8 – TEAM	4 – Holmes	GSU Sports Arena (442); Atlanta, GA
Conference Regular Season
01/01/2021; 2:00 p.m., ESPN+		at South Alabama	L 65–71	4–4 (0–1)	12 – Vickers	15 – Vickers	4 – Vickers	Mitchell Center (270); Mobile, AL
01/02/2021; 2:00 p.m., ESPN+		at South Alabama	W 78–71	5–4 (1–1)	15 – Gaulden	9 – Vickers	4 – Vickers	Mitchell Center (316); Mobile, AL
01/08/2021; 6:00 p.m., ESPN+		Appalachian State	W 87–56	6–4 (2–1)	16 – Hamilton	6 – Vickers	3 – Hamilton	Hanner Fieldhouse (231); Statesboro, GA
01/09/2021; 4:00 p.m., ESPN+		Appalachian State	L 58–70	6–5 (2–2)	16 – Barber	6 – Barber	2 – Barber	Hanner Fieldhouse (213); Statesboro, GA
01/15/2021; 7:00 p.m., ESPN+		at Troy	L 70–87	6–6 (2–3)	18 – James	8 – TEAM	6 – Barber	Trojan Arena (891); Troy, AL
01/16/2021; 5:00 p.m., ESPN+		at Troy	L 69–82	6–7 (2–4)	22 – Gaulden	8 – Vickers	5 – Gaulden	Trojan Arena (822); Troy, AL
01/22/2021; 6:00 p.m., ESPN+		South Alabama	L 58–59	6–8 (2–5)	18 – Holmes	9 – Vickers	3 – Gaulden	Hanner Fieldhouse (257); Statesboro, GA
01/23/2021; 4:00 p.m., ESPN+		South Alabama	W 68–56	7–8 (3–5)	11 – Holmes	7 – Ward	2 – Gaulden	Hanner Fieldhouse (203); Statesboro, GA
02/05/2021; 6:00 p.m., ESPN+		Troy	W 96–91	8–8 (4–5)	20 – Johnson	15 – Ward	5 – Gaulden	Hanner Fieldhouse (188); Statesboro, GA
02/06/2021; 4:00 p.m., ESPN+		Troy	L 83–92	8–9 (4–6)	20 – Ward	9 – Ward	6 – Gaulden	Hanner Fieldhouse (433); Statesboro, GA
02/11/2021; 6:00 p.m., ESPN+		Georgia State	W 77–69	9–9 (5–6)	17 – Barber	9 – TEAM	2 – Holmes	Hanner Fieldhouse (244); Statesboro, GA
02/13/2021; 2:00 p.m., ESPN+		at Georgia State	L 66–71	9–10 (5–7)	15 – Burns	8 – Burns	5 – Love–Hill	GSU Sports Arena (619); Atlanta, GA
02/16/2021; 4:00 p.m., ESPN+		Coastal Carolina	Cancelled due to weather concerns					Hanner Fieldhouse; Statesboro, GA
02/19/2021; 6:00 p.m., ESPN+		Coastal Carolina	Cancelled due to weather concerns					Hanner Fieldhouse; Statesboro, GA
Non-conference Regular Season
02/20/2021*; 3:00 p.m., ESPN+		North Carolina Central	W 84–60	10–10	13 – Ward	10 – Moore	4 – Robins	Hanner Fieldhouse (122); Statesboro, GA
02/21/2021*; 2:00 p.m., ESPN+		North Carolina Central	W 73–65	11–10	19 – Holmes	15 – Moore	7 – Love-Hill	Hanner Fieldhouse (76); Statesboro, GA
Conference Regular Season
02/26/2021; 6:00 p.m., ESPN+		at Appalachian State	L 66–77	11–11 (5–8)	12 – Ward	6 – Burns	3 – Moore	Holmes Center (47); Boone, NC
02/27/2021; 4:00 p.m., ESPN+		at Appalachian State	L 78–81	11–12 (5–9)	26 – Ward	10 – Moore	3 – Ward	Holmes Center (86); Boone, NC
Sun Belt Tournament
03/05/2021; 12:30 pm, ESPN+	(E5)	vs. (W4) Texas State; First Round	L 61–94	11–13	12 – Holmes	7 – TEAM	3 – Hamilton	Hartsell Arena (200); Pensacola, FL
*Non-conference game. ^{#}Rankings from AP Poll. (#) Tournament seedings in parentheses. All times are in Eastern Time.

== See also ==
- 2020–21 Georgia Southern Eagles men's basketball team
