= 2021 Sun Belt Conference women's basketball tournament =

- Classification: Division I
- Season: 2020–21
- Teams: 12
- Site: Pensacola Bay Center, Hartsell Arena; Pensacola, Florida
- Champions: Troy (3rd title)
- Winning coach: Chanda Rigby (9th title)
- MVP: Alexus Dye (Troy)
- Television: ESPN+, ESPNU

2020–21 Sun Belt Conference women's basketball standings
	Conf.				Overall
Team	W		L	PCT	W		L	PCT
East
Troy †	15	–	2	.882	22	–	6	.786
Georgia State	9	–	7	.563	13	–	11	.542
Appalachian State	10	–	8	.556	15	–	12	.556
South Alabama	9	–	9	.500	13	–	13	.500
Georgia Southern	5	–	9	.357	11	–	13	.458
Coastal Carolina	0	–	13	.000	3	–	15	.167
West
Louisiana	13	–	1	.929	16	–	7	.696
UT Arlington	11	–	4	.733	13	–	7	.650
Little Rock	9	–	7	.563	15	–	11	.577
Texas State	7	–	8	.467	11	–	11	.500
Arkansas State	4	–	10	.286	9	–	12	.429
Louisiana–Monroe	1	–	15	.063	2	–	20	.091
† 2021 Sun Belt tournament winner

The 2021 Sun Belt Conference women's basketball tournament was the postseason women's basketball tournament for the Sun Belt Conference that took place March 5–8, 2021, at the Pensacola Bay Center for majority of the games and a few First round and Quarterfinal matchups at Hartsell Arena on the campus of Pensacola State College, both in Pensacola, Florida. All games were broadcast on ESPN+, and the championship game was televised on ESPNU.

== Format ==
All 12 teams were eligible for the tournament. Seeding was decided by divisions – the top two teams with the best overall conference records in each division received first-round byes. The remaining seeds were determined based on division finish. In the event of a tie for a particular seed, the seed was determined within each division.

The #1 seeds of each division faced the winner of the game between the #4 seed from the opposite division and the #5 seed from the team's same division in the quarterfinal round. Similarly, the #2 seeds of each division faced the winner of the #3 seed from the opposite division and the #6 seed from the same division. The semifinal round featured the winner of the #1 seeds' quarterfinal games against the winner of the game featuring the #2 seeds from the opposite division.

== Seeds ==
East Division
Seed	School	Conference	Overall	Tiebreaker
1	Troy ‡	15–2	19–5	
2	Georgia State	9–7	13–10	
3	Appalachian State	10–8	13–11	
4	South Alabama	9–9	12–12	
5	Georgia Southern	5–9	11–12	
6	Coastal Carolina	0–13	3–14	
West Division
Seed	School	Conference	Overall	Tiebreaker
1	Louisiana ‡	13–1	14–5	
2	UT Arlington	11–4	13–6	
3	Little Rock	9–7	13–10	
4	Texas State	7–8	10–10	
5	Arkansas State	4–10	9–11	
6	Louisiana–Monroe	1–15	3–19	
‡ – Sun Belt regular season division champions. Overall records are as of the end of the regular season.

== Schedule ==
Game	Time*	Matchup^{#}	Television	Score
First round - Friday, March 5
1	12:00 pm	#3W Appalachian State vs. #6W Louisiana–Monroe	ESPN+	70–60
2	12:30 pm	#4W Texas State vs. #5E Georgia Southern	ESPN+	94–61
3	2:30 pm	#3W Little Rock vs. #6E Coastal Carolina	ESPN+	75–64
4	3:00 pm	#4E South Alabama vs. #5W Arkansas State	ESPN+	73–64
Quarterfinals - Saturday, March 6
5	12:00 pm	#4W Texas State vs. #1E Troy	ESPN+	103–90
6	12:30 pm	#3E Appalachian State vs. #2W UT Arlington	ESPN+	54–46
7	2:30 pm	#4E South Alabama vs. #1W Louisiana	ESPN+	65–46
8	3:00 pm	#3W Little Rock vs. #2E Georgia State	ESPN+	75–68
Semifinals - Sunday March 7
9	12:00 pm	#3E Appalachian State vs. #1E Troy	ESPN+	66–63
10	2:30 pm	#3W Little Rock vs. #1W Louisiana	ESPN+	58–48
Championship Game - Monday, March 8
11	2:00 pm	#1E Troy vs. #1W Louisiana	ESPNU	73–65

*Game times in Eastern Time. #Rankings denote tournament seeding.

== Bracket ==
First round March 5, 2021; ESPN+
4W	Texas State	94
5E	Georgia Southern	61
3E	Appalachian State	70
6W	Louisiana–Monroe	60
3W	Little Rock	75
6E	Coastal Carolina	64
4E	South Alabama	73
5W	Arkansas State	64

Quarterfinals; March 6, 2021; ESPN+
4W	Texas State	90
1E	Troy	103
2W	UT Arlington	46
3E	Appalachian State	56
3W	Little Rock	75
2E	Georgia State	68
1W	Louisiana	65
4E	South Alabama	46

Semifinals; March 7, 2021; ESPN+
1E	Troy	66
3E	Appalachian State	63
3W	Little Rock	48
1W	Louisiana	58

Championship; March 8, 2021; ESPNU
1E	Troy	73
1W	Louisiana	65

== See also ==
2021 Sun Belt Conference men's basketball tournament
