= 2020–21 UT Arlington Mavericks women's basketball team =

Intercollegiate basketball season

2020–21 UT Arlington Mavericks women's basketball
- Conference: Sun Belt Conference
- Record: 13–7 (11–4 Sun Belt)
- Head coach: Shereka Wright (1st season)
- Assistant coaches: Gerald Ewing; Rosalyn Tindel; Sean Ehlbeck
- Home arena: College Park Center

2020–21 Sun Belt Conference women's basketball standings
	Conf.				Overall
Team	W		L	PCT	W		L	PCT
East
Troy †	15	–	2	.882	22	–	6	.786
Georgia State	9	–	7	.563	13	–	11	.542
Appalachian State	10	–	8	.556	15	–	12	.556
South Alabama	9	–	9	.500	13	–	13	.500
Georgia Southern	5	–	9	.357	11	–	13	.458
Coastal Carolina	0	–	13	.000	3	–	15	.167
West
Louisiana	13	–	1	.929	16	–	7	.696
UT Arlington	11	–	4	.733	13	–	7	.650
Little Rock	9	–	7	.563	15	–	11	.577
Texas State	7	–	8	.467	11	–	11	.500
Arkansas State	4	–	10	.286	9	–	12	.429
Louisiana–Monroe	1	–	15	.063	2	–	20	.091
† 2021 Sun Belt tournament winner

The 2020–21 UT Arlington Mavericks women's basketball team represented the University of Texas at Arlington during the 2020–21 NCAA Division I women's basketball season. The Mavericks, led by first-year head coach Shereka Wright, played all home games at the College Park Center in Arlington, Texas. They were members of the Sun Belt Conference.

The Mavericks finished the season with a 13–7 overall record, 11–4 in Sun Belt play, to finish in second place in the West Division. As the second seed from the West in the Sun Belt tournament, they earned a bye into the second round where they lost to Appalachian State. The Mavericks were not invited to the NCAA tournament or the WNIT.

== Previous season ==
The Mavericks, led by Krista Gerlich, finished the 2019–20 season 21–11, 14–4 in Sun Belt play, to finish third in the conference. They made it to the 2019–20 Sun Belt Conference women's basketball tournament where they defeated Texas State in the first round before losing to South Alabama in the quarterfinals. Following the season, all conference tournaments as well as all postseason play was cancelled due to the COVID-19 pandemic. This was also Gerlich's last season at the helm of the program as she took on the position of head coach at Texas Tech following the season. Gerlich left the program as the winningest coach in women's basketball program history.

== Offseason ==
=== Departures ===
Name	Number	Pos.	Height	Year	Hometown	Notes
Katie Mayhue	1	G	5' 10"	Sophomore	Albany, OR	Retired
Marie Benson	12	F	6' 1"	Senior	Waco, TX	Graduated
Aysia Evans	24	G	5' 6"	Senior	Tulsa, OK	Graduated

=== Transfers ===
Name	Number	Pos.	Height	Year	Hometown	Previous school
Shyia Smith	34	F	5' 11"	Junior	Idabel, OK	Wichita State

=== Recruiting ===
College recruiting information
Name	Hometown	School	Height	Weight	Commit date
Michala Pullen-Monroe; Guard	Waco, TX	Crowley HS	5 ft 8 in (1.73 m)	N/A	
Michala Pullen-Monroe; Guard	Recruit ratings: No ratings found				
Overall recruit ranking:
Note: In many cases, Scout, Rivals, 247Sports, On3, and ESPN may conflict in their listings of height and weight.; In these cases, the average was taken. ESPN grades are on a 100-point scale.; Sources: "UT Arlington 2020-21 Basketball Commits". ESPN.; "2020-21 Team Ranking". Rivals.com.

== Roster ==
2020–21 UT Arlington Mavericks women's basketball team
Players
Coaches

Pos.	#	Name	Height	Year	Previous school	Hometown
G	2	Michala Pullen-Monroe	5 ft 8 in (1.73 m)	Fr	Crowley HS	Waco, TX
C	3	Misty Dossey	6 ft 5 in (1.96 m)	Jr	Comanche HS	Comanche, OK
G	5	Jordynn Hernandez	5 ft 8 in (1.73 m)	RS Sr	McKinney Boyd HS; Collin College	McKinney, TX
G	20	Claire Chastain	6 ft 0 in (1.83 m)	Jr	Dale HS	Shawnee, OK
G	21	Terryn Hilton	5 ft 9 in (1.75 m)	Jr	Owasso High School	Owasso, OK
G	23	Camryn Hawkins	5 ft 10 in (1.78 m)	Jr	Rio Rancho HS	Albuquerque, NM
F	31	Bre Wickware	6 ft 1 in (1.85 m)	RS Sr	Guyer HS; Indiana	Denton, TX
G	33	Barbara Benson	5 ft 11 in (1.8 m)	Sr	Midway HS; UTSA	Waco, TX
F	34	Shyia Smith	5 ft 11 in (1.8 m)	Jr	Idabel HS; Wichita State	Idabel, OK
C	40	Michaela Wright	6 ft 5 in (1.96 m)	Sr	Father Tolton Catholic HS	Columbia, MO
G	41	Katie Ferrell	6 ft 1 in (1.85 m)	Jr	Plano HS	Plano, TX
F	45	Emma Halverson	6 ft 3 in (1.91 m)	Jr	Plano HS	Plano, TX

Head coach

- Shereka Wright (Purdue)

Assistant coach(es)

- Gerald Ewing (Cal State Dominguez Hills)
- Rosalyn Tindel (Midwestern State)
- Sean Ehlbeck (Maryland)

Legend

- (C) Team captain
- (S) Suspended
- (I) Ineligible
- (W) Walk-on
- Injured
- Current redshirt

Roster
Last update: September 5, 2024

== Schedule and results ==
Date time, TV	Rank^{#}	Opponent^{#}	Result	Record	High points	High rebounds	High assists	Site city, state
Non-conference regular season
November 25, 2020*; 11:00 a.m.		Texas A&M–Commerce	W 74–45	1–0	21 – Wickware	11 – Ferrell	6 – Ferrell	College Park Center (624); Arlington, TX
December 8, 2020*; 6:30 p.m.		at Stephen F. Austin	L 57–79	1–1	19 – Smith	8 – TEAM	3 – Hernandez	William R. Johnson Coliseum (464); Nacogdoches, TX
December 13, 2020*; 2:00 p.m.		St. Edward's	W 78–64	2–1	15 – Smith	8 – Smith	10 – Ferrell	College Park Center (624); Arlington, TX
December 19, 2020*; 5:30 p.m.		vs. North Texas; South Padre Island Classic	L 56–74	2–2	14 – Hawkins	8 – Halverson	4 – Hernandez	UTRGV Fieldhouse; Edinburg, TX
Conference regular season
January 1, 2021; 1:00 p.m., ESPN+		Little Rock	L 56–57	2–3 (0–1)	21 – Smith	5 – Hernandez	5 – Milton	College Park Center (624); Arlington, TX
January 2, 2021; 4:00 p.m., ESPN+		Little Rock	W 59–54	3–3 (1–1)	15 – Wickware	6 – Smith	5 – Milton	College Park Center (624); Arlington, TX
January 8, 2021; 6:00 p.m., ESPN+		Louisiana–Monroe	W 82–37	4–3 (2–1)	24 – Milton	8 – Dossey	7 – Ferrell	College Park Center (624); Arlington, TX
January 9, 2021; 4:00 p.m., ESPN+		Louisiana–Monroe	W 61–37	5–3 (3–1)	25 – Wickware	11 – Wickware	6 – Ferrell	College Park Center (624); Arlington, TX
January 22, 2021; 6:30 p.m., ESPN+		at Little Rock	W 55–50	6–3 (4–1)	13 – Milton	7 – Halverson	5 – Milton	Jack Stephens Center (376); Little Rock, AR
January 23, 2021; 4:00 p.m., ESPN+		at Little Rock	L 40–47	6–4 (4–2)	14 – Hernandez	7 – Milton	2 – Milton	Jack Stephens Center (331); Little Rock, AR
January 29, 2021; 6:00 p.m., ESPN+		Arkansas State	W 62–43	7–4 (5–2)	12 – Milton	7 – Smith	8 – Milton	College Park Center (624); Arlington, TX
January 30, 2021; 4:00 p.m., ESPN+		Arkansas State	W 80–71	8–4 (6–2)	20 – Wickware	7 – Smith	9 – Ferrell	College Park Center (624); Arlington, TX
February 5, 2021; 6:00 p.m., ESPN+		at Louisiana–Monroe	W 72–60	9–4 (7–2)	16 – Smtih	5 – Ferrell	5 – Ferrell	Fant–Ewing Coliseum (652); Monroe, LA
February 6, 2021; 4:00 p.m., ESPN+		at Louisiana–Monroe	W 64–39	10–4 (8–2)	18 – Wickware	10 – Smith	7 – Ferrell	Fant–Ewing Coliseum (637); Monroe, LA
February 8, 2021; 4:00 p.m., ESPN+		at Louisiana	L 48–57	10–5 (8–3)	16 – Smith	9 – Smith	6 – Ferrell	Cajundome (192); Lafayette, LA
February 12, 2021; 2:00 p.m., ESPN+		at Texas State	L 45–66	10–6 (8–4)	11 – Wickware	5 – Milton	4 – Ferrell	Strahan Arena (502); San Marcos, TX
February 13, 2021; 4:00 p.m., ESPN+		Texas State	W 51–43	11–6 (9–4)	12 – Wickware	8 – Wickware	5 – Ferrell	College Park Center (624); Arlington, TX
February 19, 2021; 6:00 p.m., ESPN+		Louisiana	Cancelled due to weather concerns					College Park Center; Arlington, TX
February 20, 2021; 4:00 p.m., ESPN+		Louisiana	Cancelled due to weather concerns					College Park Center; Arlington, TX
February 26, 2021; 6:00 p.m., ESPN+		at Arkansas State	W 60–40	12–6 (10–4)	17 – Hawkins	8 – Wickware	4 – Milton	First National Bank Arena (342); Jonesboro, AR
February 27, 2021; 4:00 p.m., ESPN+		at Arkansas State	W 75–64	13–6 (11–4)	18 – Milton	7 – Wright	6 – Milton	First National Bank Arena (367); Jonesboro, AR
Sun Belt tournament
March 6, 2021; 11:30 a.m., ESPN+	(W2)	vs. (E3) Appalachian State; Quarterfinals	L 46–54	13–7	13 – Milton	7 – Benson	3 – Milton	Hartsell Arena; Pensacola, FL
*Non-conference game. ^{#}Rankings from AP poll. (#) Tournament seedings in parentheses. All times are in Central.

== See also ==
- 2020–21 UT Arlington Mavericks men's basketball team
