= 2020–21 Little Rock Trojans women's basketball team =

Intercollegiate basketball season

2020–21 Little Rock Trojans women's basketball
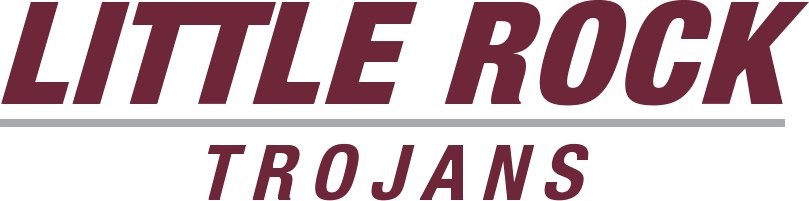
- Conference: Sun Belt Conference
- Record: 15–11 (9–7 Sun Belt)
- Head coach: Joe Foley (18th season)
- Assistant coaches: Alicia Cash; Steve Wiedower; Bobby Brasel
- Home arena: Jack Stephens Center

2020–21 Sun Belt Conference women's basketball standings
	Conf.				Overall
Team	W		L	PCT	W		L	PCT
East
Troy †	15	–	2	.882	22	–	6	.786
Georgia State	9	–	7	.563	13	–	11	.542
Appalachian State	10	–	8	.556	15	–	12	.556
South Alabama	9	–	9	.500	13	–	13	.500
Georgia Southern	5	–	9	.357	11	–	13	.458
Coastal Carolina	0	–	13	.000	3	–	15	.167
West
Louisiana	13	–	1	.929	16	–	7	.696
UT Arlington	11	–	4	.733	13	–	7	.650
Little Rock	9	–	7	.563	15	–	11	.577
Texas State	7	–	8	.467	11	–	11	.500
Arkansas State	4	–	10	.286	9	–	12	.429
Louisiana–Monroe	1	–	15	.063	2	–	20	.091
† 2021 Sun Belt tournament winner

The 2020–21 Little Rock Trojans women's basketball team represented the University of Arkansas at Little Rock during the 2020–21 NCAA Division I women's basketball season. The basketball team, led by eighteenth-year head coach Joe Foley, played all home games at the Jack Stephens Center along with the Little Rock Trojans men's basketball team. They were members of the Sun Belt Conference.

== Previous season ==
The Trojans finished the 2019–20 season 12–19, 9–9 in Sun Belt play to finish sixth in the conference. They made it to the 2019-20 Sun Belt Conference women's basketball tournament where they defeated Appalachian State in the First Round before being defeated by Louisiana in the Quarterfinals. Following the season, all conference tournaments as well as all postseason play was cancelled due to the COVID-19 pandemic.

== Offseason ==
=== Departures ===
Name	Number	Pos.	Height	Year	Hometown	Notes
Skyla Knight	1	G	5'7"	Freshman	Hoover, AL	Transfer to Butler
Kiana Anderson	4	F	6'1"	Freshman	New Orleans, Louisiana	Retired
Tori Lasker	5	G	5'7"	Junior	Mayflower, Arkansas	Transfer to Drury
Sydney Chastain	12	G	5'7"	Senior	Oklahoma City, Oklahoma	Graduated
Kyra Collier	23	G	5'9"	Senior	North Little Rock, Arkansas	Graduated
Nicole Hemphill	32	F	6'0"	Freshman	San Antonio, Texas	Retired

=== Transfers ===
Name	Number	Pos.	Height	Year	Hometown	Old School
Dariel Johnson	13	F	6'1"	Junior	Pasadena, California	Pasadena City College
Bre'Amber Scott	23	G	5'11"	Redshirt Junior	Little Rock, Arkansas	Mississippi State
Maya Caicedo	24	G	5'3"	Junior	Buga, Colombia	New Mexico JC

=== Recruiting ===
College recruiting information
Name	Hometown	School	Height	Weight	Commit date
De'Mya Young; Guard	Manor, TX	Manor HS	5 ft 9 in (1.75 m)	N/A	Nov 18, 2019
De'Mya Young; Guard	Recruit ratings: No ratings found				
Mekayla Holley; Guard	Carrollton, TX	Creekview HS	5 ft 7 in (1.70 m)	N/A	Nov 15, 2019
Mekayla Holley; Guard	Recruit ratings: No ratings found				
Tia Harvey; Guard	Sachse, TX	Sachse HS	5 ft 9 in (1.75 m)	N/A	Nov 15, 2019
Tia Harvey; Guard	Recruit ratings: No ratings found				
Paloma Iradier; Forward	Santander, Spain	IES Feria del Atlantico	6 ft 3 in (1.91 m)	N/A	
Paloma Iradier; Forward	Recruit ratings: No ratings found				
Trinitee Alexander; Forward	Everman, TX	Everman HS	5 ft 11 in (1.80 m)	N/A	May 1, 2020
Trinitee Alexander; Forward	Recruit ratings: No ratings found				
Overall recruit ranking:
Note: In many cases, Scout, Rivals, 247Sports, On3, and ESPN may conflict in their listings of height and weight.; In these cases, the average was taken. ESPN grades are on a 100-point scale.; Sources: "Little Rock 2020-21 Basketball Commits". ESPN.; "2020-21 Team Ranking". Rivals.com.

== Roster ==
2020–21 Little Rock Trojans women's basketball team
Players
Coaches

Pos.	#	Name	Height	Year	Previous school	Hometown
G	2	Ky'lie Scott	5 ft 9 in (1.75 m)	So	Denton HS	Denton, TX
G	5	De'Mya Young	5 ft 9 in (1.75 m)	Fr	Manor HS	Manor, TX
F	10	Krystan Vornes	6 ft 2 in (1.88 m)	Sr	Osceola HS; Tulsa	Osceola, AR
G	11	Mekayla Holley	5 ft 7 in (1.7 m)	Fr	Creekview HS	Carrollton, TX
G	12	Tia Harvey	5 ft 9 in (1.75 m)	Fr	Sachse HS	Sachse, TX
F	13	Dariel Johnson	6 ft 1 in (1.85 m)	Jr	Pasadena HS; Pasadena City College	Pasadena, CA
F	15	Paloma Iradier	6 ft 3 in (1.91 m)	Fr	IES Feria del Atlantico	Santander, Spain
G	23	Bre'Amber Scott	5 ft 11 in (1.8 m)	RS Jr	Central HS; Mississippi State	Little Rock, AR
G	24	Mayra Caicedo	5 ft 3 in (1.6 m)	Jr	San Vincente de Paul HS; New Mexico JC	Buga, Colombia
F	25	Alayzha Knapp	6 ft 2 in (1.88 m)	So	Union HS	Tulsa, OK
F	31	Brianna Crane	6 ft 0 in (1.83 m)	RS Jr	Ramsay HS; Murray State	Birmingham, AL
F	33	Trinitee Alexander	5 ft 11 in (1.8 m)	Fr	Everman HS	Everman, TX
F	34	Angelique Francis	5 ft 11 in (1.8 m)	So	MacArthur HS	Irving, TX
F	35	Teal Battle	6 ft 1 in (1.85 m)	Sr	White Station HS	Millington, TX

Head coach

- Joe Foley (Central Arkansas)

Assistant coach(es)

- Alicia Cash (Little Rock)
- Steve Wiedower (Central Arkansas)
- Bobby Brasel (UT Permian Basin)

Legend

- (C) Team captain
- (S) Suspended
- (I) Ineligible
- (W) Walk-on
- Injured
- Current redshirt

Roster
Last update: December 11, 2020

== Schedule and results ==
Date time, TV	Rank^{#}	Opponent^{#}	Result	Record	High points	High rebounds	High assists	Site city, state
Non-conference Regular Season
11/28/2020*; 2:00 p.m.		Rice	L 54–66	0–1	19 – B. Scott	5 – Caicedo	6 – Caicedo	Jack Stephens Center (222); Little Rock, AR
12/01/2020*; 7:00 p.m., ESPN+		at Memphis	W 61–52	1–1	18 – Crane	17 – Johnson	10 – Caicedo	Elma Roane Fieldhouse (75); Memphis, TN
12/05/2020*; 2:00 p.m., ESPN+		Vanderbilt	W 82–74	2–1	28 – B. Scott	7 – Vornes	14 – Caicedo	Jack Stephens Center (353); Little Rock, AR
12/10/2020*; 6:30 p.m., ESPN+		No. 10 Texas A&M	L 56–79	2–2	21 – B. Scott	12 – Vornes	7 – Caicedo	Jack Stephens Center (408); Little Rock, AR
12/13/2020*; 2:00 p.m., ESPN+		Western Kentucky	W 63–47	3–2	21 – Battle	15 – Vornes	5 – B. Scott	Jack Stephens Center (305); Little Rock, AR
12/16/2020*; 7:00 p.m.		vs. Central Arkansas	W 60–50	4–2	24 – B. Scott	6 – Johnson	6 – Caicedo	Farris Center (256); Conway, AR
12/19/2020*; 2:00 p.m., ESPN+		No. 12 Arkansas	L 70–80	4–3	27 – Crane	13 – Vornes	10 – Caicedo	Jack Stephens Center (1,061); Little Rock, AR
Conference Regular Season
01/01/2021; 1:00 p.m., ESPN+		at UT Arlington	W 57–56	5–3 (1–0)	27 – B. Scott	5 – Vornes	4 – Caicedo	College Park Center (624); Arlington, TX
01/02/2021; 4:00 p.m., ESPN+		at UT Arlington	L 54–59	5–4 (1–1)	16 – B. Scott	10 – Vornes	3 – B. Scott	College Park Center (624); Arlington, TX
01/22/2021; 6:30 p.m., ESPN+		UT Arlington	L 50–55	5–5 (1–2)	19 – K. Scott	10 – Vornes	4 – Caicedo	Jack Stephens Center (376); Little Rock, AR
01/23/2021; 4:00 p.m., ESPN+		UT Arlington	W 47–40	6–5 (2–2)	18 – Knapp	16 – Vornes	11 – Caicedo	Jack Stephens Center (331); Little Rock, AR
01/25/2021; 5:30 p.m., ESPN+		Louisiana	L 45–54	6–6 (2–3)	17 – K. Scott	11 – Vornes	4 – Caicedo	Jack Stephens Center (232); Little Rock, AR
01/29/2021; 2:00 p.m., ESPN+		Louisiana–Monroe	W 71–36	7–6 (3–3)	23 – K. Scott	10 – Vornes	17 – Caicedo	Jack Stephens Center (226); Little Rock, AR
01/30/2021; 1:00 p.m., ESPN+		Louisiana–Monroe	W 67–42	8–6 (4–3)	23 – Vornes	11 – Vornes	7 – Caicedo	Jack Stephens Center; Little Rock, AR
02/02/2021; 6:00 p.m., ESPN+		at Texas State	L 44–51	8–7 (4–4)	11 – Battle	7 – Francis	3 – Caicedo	Strahan Arena (503); San Marcos, TX
02/05/2021; 6:30 p.m., ESPN+		Texas State	W 62–51	9–7 (5–4)	20 – Battle	13 – Vornes	5 – Battle	Jack Stephens Center (292); Little Rock, AR
02/06/2021; 4:00 p.m., ESPN+		Texas State	W 63–49	10–7 (6–4)	18 – K. Scott	6 – Vornes	8 – Caicedo	Jack Stephens Center (305); Little Rock, AR
02/12/2021; 5:00 p.m., ESPN+		at Arkansas State	W 70–63	11–7 (7–4)	14 – Vornes	8 – Francis	6 – Harvey	First National Bank Arena; Jonesboro, AR
02/13/2021; 2:00 p.m., ESPN+		Arkansas State	W 60–56 ^{OT}	12–7 (8–4)	25 – Battle	11 – Battle	9 – Caicedo	Jack Stephens Center; Little Rock, AR
02/21/2021; 1:00 p.m., ESPN+		at Louisiana–Monroe	W 66–46	13–7 (9–4)	21 – Vornes	13 – Vornes	8 – Caicedo	Fant–Ewing Coliseum; Monroe, LA
02/22/2021; 1:00 p.m., ESPN+		at Louisiana–Monroe	L 44–62	13–8 (9–5)	14 – Battle	7 – Vornes	5 – Caicedo	Fant–Ewing Coliseum; Monroe, LA
02/26/2021; 6:00 p.m., ESPN+		at Louisiana	L 52–63	13–9 (9–6)	15 – Battle	12 – Vornes	4 – Harvey	Cajundome (179); Lafayette, LA
02/27/2021; 4:00 p.m., ESPN+		at Louisiana	L 32–60	13–10 (9–7)	16 – Battle	10 – Vornes	2 – Francis	Cajundome (390); Lafayette, LA
Sun Belt Tournament
03/05/2021; 1:30 pm, ESPN+	(W3)	vs. (E6) Coastal Carolina; First Round	W 75–64	14–10	17 – Battle	12 – Francis	9 – Caicedo	Pensacola Bay Center; Pensacola, FL
03/06/2021; 2:00 pm, ESPN+	(W3)	vs. (E2) Georgia State; Quarterfinals	W 75–68	15–10	25 – Battle	10 – Francis	10 – Caicedo	Hartsell Arena; Pensacola, FL
03/06/2021; 2:00 pm, ESPN+	(W3)	vs. (W1) Louisiana; Semifinals	L 48–58	15–11	11 – Scott	7 – Francis	6 – Caicedo	Pensacola Bay Center; Pensacola, FL
*Non-conference game. ^{#}Rankings from AP Poll. (#) Tournament seedings in parentheses. All times are in Central Time.

== See also ==
- 2020–21 Little Rock Trojans men's basketball team
