= 2020–21 Georgia State Panthers women's basketball team =

Intercollegiate basketball season

2020–21 Georgia State Panthers women's basketball
- Conference: Sun Belt Conference
- Record: 13–11 (9–7 Sun Belt)
- Head coach: Gene Hill (3rd season)
- Assistant coaches: Sherill Baker; A. G. Hall; Tiffany Morton
- Home arena: GSU Sports Arena

2020–21 Sun Belt Conference women's basketball standings
	Conf.				Overall
Team	W		L	PCT	W		L	PCT
East
Troy †	15	–	2	.882	22	–	6	.786
Georgia State	9	–	7	.563	13	–	11	.542
Appalachian State	10	–	8	.556	15	–	12	.556
South Alabama	9	–	9	.500	13	–	13	.500
Georgia Southern	5	–	9	.357	11	–	13	.458
Coastal Carolina	0	–	13	.000	3	–	15	.167
West
Louisiana	13	–	1	.929	16	–	7	.696
UT Arlington	11	–	4	.733	13	–	7	.650
Little Rock	9	–	7	.563	15	–	11	.577
Texas State	7	–	8	.467	11	–	11	.500
Arkansas State	4	–	10	.286	9	–	12	.429
Louisiana–Monroe	1	–	15	.063	2	–	20	.091
† 2021 Sun Belt tournament winner

The 2020–21 Georgia State Panthers women's basketball team represented Georgia State University during the 2020–21 NCAA Division I women's basketball season. The basketball team, led by third-year head coach Gene Hill, played all home games at the GSU Sports Arena along with the Georgia State Panthers men's basketball team. They were members of the Sun Belt Conference.

== Previous season ==
The Panthers finished the 2019–20 season 8–21, 5–13 in Sun Belt play to finish eleventh in the conference. They failed to make it to the 2019-20 Sun Belt Conference women's basketball tournament. Following the season, all conference tournaments as well as all postseason play was cancelled due to the COVID-19 pandemic.

== Offseason ==
=== Departures ===
Name	Number	Pos.	Height	Year	Hometown	Notes
Allison Johnson	0	F	6'0"	Graduate Student	Norcross, GA	Graduated
Emma Drash	5	G	5'5"	Freshman	Atlanta, Georgia	Retired
Jada Lewis	13	G	5'7"	Redshirt Junior	Powder Springs, Georgia	Transfer to Mercer
Madison Ervin	15	G	5'7"	Senior	Morganton, North Carolina	Graduated
Shaquanda Miller-McCray	30	C	6'3"	Senior	Horatio, South Carolina	Graduated

=== Transfers ===
Name	Number	Pos.	Height	Year	Hometown	Old School
Deasia Merrill	0	F	6'1"	Redshirt Freshman	Villa Rica, Georgia	Kentucky
Elexus Bell	30	C	6'1"	Junior	Carrollton, Georgia	Southern Union State CC

=== Recruiting ===
College recruiting
Name	Hometown	School	Height	Weight	Commit date
Ciara Smith; Guard	Atlanta, GA	Riverwood Charter	5 ft 9 in (1.75 m)	N/A	
Ciara Smith; Guard	Recruit ratings: No ratings found				
Overall recruit ranking:
Note: In many cases, Scout, Rivals, 247Sports, On3, and ESPN may conflict in their listings of height and weight.; In these cases, the average was taken. ESPN grades are on a 100-point scale.; Sources: "Georgia State 2020-21 Basketball Commits". ESPN.; "2020-21 Team Ranking". Rivals.com.

== Roster ==
2020–21 Georgia State Panthers women's basketball team
Players
Coaches

Pos.	#	Name	Height	Year	Previous school	Hometown
F	0	Deasia Merrill	6 ft 1 in (1.85 m)	RS Fr	Villa Ricca HS; Kentucky	Villa Rica, GA
G	1	Moriah Taylor	5 ft 4 in (1.63 m)	So	Hartselle HS	Hartselle, AL
G	2	Kennedy Powell	5 ft 8 in (1.73 m)	So	Roswell HS	Roswell, GA
F	4	Joelle Johnson	5 ft 11 in (1.8 m)	So	Male HS	Louisville, KY
G	5	Ciara Smith	5 ft 9 in (1.75 m)	Fr	Riverwood Charter	Atlanta, GA
G	10	Kamryn Dziak	5 ft 8 in (1.73 m)	So	Steele HS	Amherst, OH
G/F	11	Taylor Hosendove	6 ft 1 in (1.85 m)	Jr	Westlake HS; Clemson	Los Angeles, CA
G	12	Tehya Lyons	5 ft 7 in (1.7 m)	RS So	Norcross HS; Pittsburgh	Norcross, GA
G	14	Ashley Foster	5 ft 8 in (1.73 m)	Jr	Eagle's Landing HS	McDonough, GA
G	21	Taniyah Worth	6 ft 0 in (1.83 m)	RS So	Flowery Branch HS; Alabama	Flowery Branch, GA
C	30	Elexus Bell	6 ft 1 in (1.85 m)	Jr	Carrollton HS; Southern Union State CC	Carrollton, GA
G	32	Taylor Henderson	5 ft 10 in (1.78 m)	So	Center Point HS	Birmingham, AL
F/C	33	Rakeah Williams	6 ft 1 in (1.85 m)	Sr	Westlake HS	Atlanta, GA
F	35	Hannah Sadler	6 ft 3 in (1.91 m)	RS So	Parkview HS	Lilburn, GA

Head coach

- Gene Hill (Coker)

Assistant coach(es)

- Sherill Baker (Georgia)
- A. G. Hall (North Carolina Central)
- Tiffany Morton (UW–Whitewater)

Legend

- (C) Team captain
- (S) Suspended
- (I) Ineligible
- (W) Walk-on
- Injured
- Current redshirt

Roster
Last update: 11 December 2020

== Schedule and results ==
Date time, TV	Rank^{#}	Opponent^{#}	Result	Record	High points	High rebounds	High assists	Site city, state
Non-conference Regular Season
11/25/2020*; 12:00 p.m., ACCN+		at Georgia Tech	L 38–62	0–1	7 – Hosendove	10 – Hosendove	2 – Taylor	McCamish Pavilion (1,200); Atlanta, GA
12/02/2020*; 6:00 p.m., ESPN+		at Tennessee State	W 88–83 ^{OT}	1–1	18 – Hosendove	16 – Hosendove	6 – Worth	Gentry Complex (139); Nashville, TN
12/06/2020*; 2:00 p.m., ESPN+		Furman	W 78–59	2–1	17 – Dziak	7 – Hosendove	7 – Lyons	GSU Sports Arena (489); Atlanta, GA
12/13/2020*; 2:00 p.m., ESPN+		Life	W 93–49	3–1	17 – Taylor	9 – Johnson	6 – Lyons	GSU Sports Arena (438); Atlanta, GA
12/17/2020*; 7:00 p.m., SECN+		at Georgia	L 51–85	3–2	15 – Hosendove	10 – TEAM	2 – Hosendove	Stegeman Coliseum (573); Athens, GA
12/20/2020*; 1:00 p.m., ESPN+		Western Carolina; GSU Holiday Classic	W 74–61	4–2	11 – Hosendove	10 – Hosendove	3 – Foster	GSU Sports Arena (482); Atlanta, GA
12/21/2020*; 3:00 p.m., ESPN+		Chattanooga; GSU Holiday Classic	L 70–73 ^{OT}	4—3	22 – Hosendove	7 – Sadler	4 – Henderson	GSU Sports Arena (337); Atlanta, GA
Conference Regular Season
01/15/2021; 6:00 p.m., ESPN+		at Coastal Carolina	W 73–55	5–3 (1–0)	17 – Worth	9 – Hosendove	5 – Hosendove	HTC Center (71); Conway, SC
01/16/2021; 4:00 p.m., ESPN+		at Coastal Carolina	W 76–65	6–3 (2–0)	16 – Worth	9 – Hosendove	5 – Hosendove	HTC Center (63); Conway, SC
01/22/2021; 6:00 p.m., ESPN+		Appalachian State	L 68–71	6–4 (2–1)	19 – Sadler	6 – Hosendove	5 – Dziak	GSU Sports Arena (488); Atlanta, GA
01/23/2021; 2:00 p.m., ESPN+		Appalachian State	L 56–66	6–5 (2–2)	17 – Johnson	6 – TEAM	3 – Lyons	GSU Sports Arena (445); Atlanta, GA
01/28/2021; 7:00 p.m., ESPN+		at South Alabama	W 47–41	7–5 (3–2)	12 – Sadler	11 – Hosendove	5 – Henderson	Mitchell Center (357); Mobile, AL
01/29/2021; 5:00 p.m., ESPN+		at South Alabama	L 46–58	7–6 (3–3)	8 – Dziak	9 – Hosendove	3 – Foster	Mitchell Center (309); Mobile, AL
02/05/2021; 6:00 p.m., ESPN+		at Appalachian State	W 72–62	8–6 (4–3)	18 – Hosendove	6 – Worth	3 – Dziak	Holmes Center (55); Boone, NC
02/06/2021; 4:00 p.m., ESPN+		at Appalachian State	W 50–48	9–6 (5–3)	10 – Hosendove	13 – Hosendove	3 – Henderson	Holmes Center (55); Boone, NC
02/11/2021; 6:00 p.m., ESPN+		at Georgia Southern	L 69–77	9–7 (5–4)	28 – Hosendove	12 – Hosendove	5 – Henderson	Hanner Fieldhouse (244); Statesboro, GA
02/13/2021; 2:00 p.m., ESPN+		Georgia Southern	W 71–66	10–7 (6–4)	11 – Foster	7 – Hosendove	2 – Dziak	GSU Sports Arena (619); Atlanta, GA
02/16/2021; 2:00 p.m., ESPN+		Troy	L 70–91	10–8 (6–5)	15 – Hosendove	7 – Hosendove	5 – Henderson	GSU Sports Arena (391); Atlanta, GA
02/19/2021; 7:00 p.m., ESPN+		at Troy	L 60–79	10–9 (6–6)	17 – Hosendove	12 – Hosendove	2 – Henderson	Trojan Arena (846); Troy, AL
02/20/2021; 5:00 p.m., ESPN+		at Troy	L 78–84	10–10 (6–7)	18 – Sadler	16 – Hosendove	3 – Henderson	Trojan Arena (902); Troy, AL
02/23/2021; 2:00 p.m., ESPN+		Coastal Carolina	W 73–68	11–10 (7–7)	16 – Worth	5 – Hosendove	5 – Henderson	GSU Sports Arena (371); Atlanta, GA
02/26/2021; 6:00 p.m., ESPN+		South Alabama	W 60–45	12–10 (8–7)	11 – Taylor	9 – Hosendove	5 – Henderson	GSU Sports Arena (449); Atlanta, GA
02/27/2021; 2:00 p.m., ESPN+		South Alabama	W 76–64	13–10 (9–7)	16 – Hosendove	13 – TEAM	7 – Hosendove	GSU Sports Arena (525); Atlanta, GA
Sun Belt Tournament
03/06/2021; 3:00 pm, ESPN+	(E2)	vs. (W3) Little Rock; Quarterfinals	L 68–75	13–11	14 – Hosendove	13 – Hosendove	6 – Hosendove	Hartsell Arena; Pensacola, FL
*Non-conference game. ^{#}Rankings from AP Poll. (#) Tournament seedings in parentheses. All times are in Eastern Time.

== See also ==
- 2020–21 Georgia State Panthers men's basketball team
