= 2020–21 Louisiana Ragin' Cajuns women's basketball team =

Intercollegiate basketball season

2020–21 Louisiana Ragin' Cajuns women's basketball

Women's NIT, Consolation First Round Sun Belt Regular Season Champions Sun Belt West Division champions
- Conference: Sun Belt Conference
- Record: 16–8 (13–1 Sun Belt)
- Head coach: Garry Brodhead (9th season)
- Assistant coaches: Deacon Jones; Amber Gregg; Valerie Huizar
- Home arena: Cajundome

2020–21 Sun Belt Conference women's basketball standings
	Conf.				Overall
Team	W		L	PCT	W		L	PCT
East
Troy †	15	–	2	.882	22	–	6	.786
Georgia State	9	–	7	.563	13	–	11	.542
Appalachian State	10	–	8	.556	15	–	12	.556
South Alabama	9	–	9	.500	13	–	13	.500
Georgia Southern	5	–	9	.357	11	–	13	.458
Coastal Carolina	0	–	13	.000	3	–	15	.167
West
Louisiana	13	–	1	.929	16	–	7	.696
UT Arlington	11	–	4	.733	13	–	7	.650
Little Rock	9	–	7	.563	15	–	11	.577
Texas State	7	–	8	.467	11	–	11	.500
Arkansas State	4	–	10	.286	9	–	12	.429
Louisiana–Monroe	1	–	15	.063	2	–	20	.091
† 2021 Sun Belt tournament winner

The 2020–21 Louisiana Ragin' Cajuns women's basketball team represented the University of Louisiana at Lafayette during the 2020–21 NCAA Division I women's basketball season. The Ragin' Cajuns, led by ninth-year head coach Garry Brodhead, played all home games at the Cajundome along with the Louisiana Ragin' Cajuns men's basketball team. They were members of the Sun Belt Conference.

For the first time ever, the Cajuns women’s basketball team captured the West Division championship as well as the Regular Season championship. Following their loss in the finals of the Conference tournament, the Cajuns were one of nine automatic bids to the WNIT.

== Previous season ==
The Ragin' Cajuns finished the 2019–20 season 19-12, 10–8 in Sun Belt play to finish in fourth place in the conference. They made it to the 2019-20 Sun Belt Conference women's basketball tournament where the defeated Georgia Southern and Little Rock before all post-season play, including the finale of the Sun Belt Tournament, was cancelled due to the COVID-19 pandemic.

== Offseason ==
=== Departures ===
Name	Number	Pos.	Height	Year	Hometown	Notes
Jazmine Thomas	3	G	5'7"	Junior	Vivian, Louisiana	Retired
Kendall Bess	22	F	6'1"	Senior	Richmond, Texas	Graduated
Jazmyn Womack	25	G/F	5'11"	Sophomore	Ponchatoula, Louisiana	Transferred to Nicholls

=== Transfers ===
Name	Number	Pos.	Height	Year	Hometown	Old School
Destiny McAfee	14	G	5'9"	Junior	Longview, Texas	Weatherford College

=== Recruiting ===
College recruiting information
Name	Hometown	School	Height	Weight	Commit date
Tamera Johnson; Forward	Lafayette, LA	Lafayette Christian Academy	5 ft 11 in (1.80 m)	N/A	Nov 13, 2019
Tamera Johnson; Forward	Recruit ratings: No ratings found				
Lafaedria Green; Forward	Monroe, LA	Ouachita Parish HS	6 ft 1 in (1.85 m)	N/A	Apr 16, 2020
Lafaedria Green; Forward	Recruit ratings: No ratings found				
Overall recruit ranking:
Note: In many cases, Scout, Rivals, 247Sports, On3, and ESPN may conflict in their listings of height and weight.; In these cases, the average was taken. ESPN grades are on a 100-point scale.; Sources: "Louisiana 2020-21 Basketball Commits". ESPN.; "2020-21 Team Ranking". Rivals.com.

== Roster ==
2020–21 Louisiana Ragin' Cajuns women's basketball team
Players
Coaches

Pos.	#	Name	Height	Year	Previous school	Hometown
G	0	Alexandria Goodly	5 ft 5 in (1.65 m)	So	St. Louis Catholic HS	Lake Charles, LA
F	1	Kimberly Burton	5 ft 11 in (1.8 m)	Sr	Red River HS	Coushatta, LA
G	2	Brandi Williams	5 ft 6 in (1.68 m)	Jr	Barbe HS	Lake Charles, LA
G	3	Makayia Hallmon	5 ft 3 in (1.6 m)	So	Red River HS	Coushatta, LA
F	5	Tamera Johnson	5 ft 11 in (1.8 m)	Fr	Lafayette Christian Academy	Lafayette, LA
G/F	11	Skyler Goodwin	5 ft 8 in (1.73 m)	Sr	Parkview Baptist HS	Baton Rouge, LA
G	14	Destiny McAfee	5 ft 9 in (1.75 m)	Jr	Longview HS; Weatherford College	Longview, TX
G	15	Diamond Morrison	5 ft 4 in (1.63 m)	Jr	East View HS	Georgetown, TX
F	20	Caira Wren	5 ft 10 in (1.78 m)	So	McKinley Senior HS	Baton Rouge, LA
F	21	Bre'Yelle Porter	6 ft 2 in (1.88 m)	So	Lafayette Christian Academy	Lafayette, LA
F	23	Kristen Daniels	5 ft 11 in (1.8 m)	RS Jr	Barbe HS; McNeese State	Lake Charles, LA
G/F	24	Jomyra Mathis	5 ft 8 in (1.73 m)	Sr	Landry Walker HS	New Orleans, LA
F	33	Lafaedria Green	6 ft 1 in (1.85 m)	Fr	Ouachita Parish HS	Monroe, LA
F	35	Ty'Reona Doucet	6 ft 1 in (1.85 m)	Sr	Ville Platte HS	Ville Platte, LA

Head coach

- Garry Boadhead (Louisiana)

Assistant coach(es)

- Deacon Jones (Louisiana)
- Amber Gregg (Texas–San Antonio)
- Valerie Huizar (LSU–Shreveport)

Legend

- (C) Team captain
- (S) Suspended
- (I) Ineligible
- (W) Walk-on
- Injured
- Current redshirt

Roster
Last update: 16 November 2020

== Schedule and results ==
Date time, TV	Rank^{#}	Opponent^{#}	Result	Record	High points	High rebounds	High assists	Site city, state
Non-conference Regular Season
12/04/2020*; 6:00 p.m.		North Texas	L 74–84	0–1	18 – Mathis	10 – Doucet	3 – Mathis	Cajundome (141); Lafayette, LA
12/09/2020*; 11:00 a.m., ESPN+		McNeese State; Education Game	W 80–48	1–1	16 – Hallmon	9 – Goodwin	4 – Mathis	Cajundome (206); Lafayette, LA
12/14/2020*; 5:00 p.m., SECN		at LSU	L 57–62	1–2	16 – Williams	10 – Doucet	3 – Doucet	Pete Maravich Assembly Center (729); Baton Rouge, LA
12/16/2020*; 2:00 p.m.		at Rice	L 51–83	1–3	16 – Williams	4 – Mathis	2 – Doucet	Tudor Fieldhouse; Houston, TX
12/20/2020*; 2:00 p.m., CST/ESPN+		at Louisiana Tech	L 65–68	1–4	17 – Johnson	7 – Doucet	5 – Mathis	Thomas Assembly Center (1,200); Ruston, LA
Conference Regular Season
01/01/2021; 4:00 p.m., ESPN+		at Texas State	L 63–71	1–5 (0–1)	20 – Williams	7 – Burton	4 – Goodly	Strahan Arena (576); San Marcos, TX
01/02/2021; 4:00 p.m., ESPN+		at Texas State	W 67–41	2–5 (1–1)	18 – Williams	8 – Goodwin	2 – Goodly	Strahan Arena (549); San Marcos, TX
01/22/2021; 6:00 p.m., ESPN+		at Arkansas State	W 67–65 ^{OT}	3–5 (2–1)	17 – Mathis	12 – Doucet	7 – Mathis	First National Bank Arena (506); Jonesboro, AR
01/23/2021; 4:00 p.m., ESPN+		at Arkansas State	W 70–58	4–5 (3–1)	18 – Williams	10 – Mathis	5 – Wren	First National Bank Arena (519); Jonesboro, AR
01/25/2021; 5:30 p.m., ESPN+		at Little Rock	W 54–45	5–5 (4–1)	14 – McAfee	12 – Doucet	4 – Mathis	Jack Stephens Center (232); Little Rock, AR
01/29/2021; 6:00 p.m., ESPN+		Texas State; Rally Program Appreciation	W 66–64	6–5 (5–1)	14 – Doucet	9 – Doucet	3 – Goodwin	Cajundome (114); Lafayette, LA
01/30/2021; 2:00 p.m., ESPN+		Texas State; Faculty/Staff Appreciation	W 66–60	7–5 (6–1)	15 – Doucet	9 – Doucet	4 – Goodly	Cajundome (151); Lafayette, LA
02/05/2021; 6:00 p.m., ESPN+		Arkansas State; NGWSD Celebration	W 52–49	8–5 (7–1)	13 – Goodwin	11 – Doucet	2 – Goodly	Cajundome (118); Lafayette, LA
02/06/2021; 2:00 p.m., ESPN+		Arkansas State; Pink Day	W 73–61	9–5 (8–1)	24 – Goodwin	10 – Burton	4 – Doucet	Cajundome (279); Lafayette, LA
02/08/2021; 4:00 p.m., ESPN+		UT Arlington; Cancer Colors Night	W 57–48	10–5 (9–1)	21 – Doucet	8 – Doucet	3 – Mathis	Cajundome (192); Lafayette, LA
02/11/2021; 3:00 p.m., ESPN+		Louisiana–Monroe; Throwback Thursday/First Responders Night	W 65–51	11–5 (10–1)	24 – Hallmon	7 – Burton	3 – Goodwin	Cajundome (183); Lafayette, LA
02/13/2021; 1:00 p.m., ESPN+		at Louisiana–Monroe	W 64–59	12–5 (11–1)	32 – Williams	6 – Goodwin	2 – Goodly	Fant–Ewing Coliseum; Monroe, LA
02/19/2021; 7:00 p.m., ESPN+		at UT Arlington	Cancelled due to weather concerns.					College Park Center; Arlington, TX
02/20/2021; 2:00 p.m., ESPN+		at UT Arlington	Cancelled due to weather concerns.					College Park Center; Arlington, TX
02/26/2021; 6:00 p.m., ESPN+		Little Rock; Alumni Weekend	W 63–52	13–5 (12–1)	18 – Goodwin	9 – Doucet	2 – Goodwin	Cajundome (179); Lafayette, LA
02/27/2021; 2:00 p.m., ESPN3		Little Rock; Senior Day/Alumni Weekend	W 60–32	14–5 (13–1)	12 – Mathis	7 – Doucet	3 – Daniels	Cajundome (390); Lafayette, LA
Sun Belt Tournament
03/06/2021; 1:30 pm, ESPN+	(W1)	vs. (E4) South Alabama; Quarterfinals	W 65–46	15–5	17 – Matthis	11 – Doucet	4 – Doucet	Pensacola Bay Center; Pensacola, FL
03/07/2021; 1:30 pm, ESPN+	(W1)	vs. (W3) Little Rock; Semifinals	W 58–48	16–5	16 – Williams	9 – Doucet	3 – Williams	Pensacola Bay Center; Pensacola, FL
03/08/2021; 1:00 pm, ESPNU	(W1)	vs. (E1) Troy; Finals	L 65–73	16–6	14 – Goodwin	10 – Goodwin	5 – Mathis	Pensacola Bay Center; Pensacola, FL
Women's NIT
03/19/2021; 2:00 pm, FloHoops		vs. Colorado; First Round	L 45–68	16–7	12 – Williams	11 – Doucet	1 – Burton	My Town Movers Fieldhouse (300); Memphis, TN
03/20/2021; 11:00 am, FloHoops		vs. UT Martin; Consolation Round 1	L 48–58	16–8	15 – Doucet	8 – Mathis	7 – Mathis	My Town Movers Fieldhouse (300); Memphis, TN
*Non-conference game. ^{#}Rankings from AP Poll. (#) Tournament seedings in parentheses. All times are in Central Time.

== See also ==
- 2020–21 Louisiana Ragin' Cajuns men's basketball team
