= 2020–21 Arkansas State Red Wolves women's basketball team =

Intercollegiate basketball season

2020–21 Arkansas State Red Wolves women's basketball
- Conference: Sun Belt Conference
- Record: 9–12 (4–10 Sun Belt)
- Head coach: Matt Daniel (Resigned)
- Assistant coaches: Destinee Rogers; Weston Jameson; Lizzie Nessling
- Home arena: First National Bank Arena

2020–21 Sun Belt Conference women's basketball standings
	Conf.				Overall
Team	W		L	PCT	W		L	PCT
East
Troy †	15	–	2	.882	22	–	6	.786
Georgia State	9	–	7	.563	13	–	11	.542
Appalachian State	10	–	8	.556	15	–	12	.556
South Alabama	9	–	9	.500	13	–	13	.500
Georgia Southern	5	–	9	.357	11	–	13	.458
Coastal Carolina	0	–	13	.000	3	–	15	.167
West
Louisiana	13	–	1	.929	16	–	7	.696
UT Arlington	11	–	4	.733	13	–	7	.650
Little Rock	9	–	7	.563	15	–	11	.577
Texas State	7	–	8	.467	11	–	11	.500
Arkansas State	4	–	10	.286	9	–	12	.429
Louisiana–Monroe	1	–	15	.063	2	–	20	.091
† 2021 Sun Belt tournament winner

The 2020–21 Arkansas State Red Wolves women's basketball team represented Arkansas State University during the 2020–21 NCAA Division I women's basketball season. The team finished the season with interim head coach and former assistant Destinee Rogers after second-year head coach Matt Daniel resigned on December 13, 2021. The team played all home games at the First National Bank Arena in Jonesboro, Arkansas along with the university's men's basketball team. They were members of the Sun Belt Conference.

== Previous season ==
The Red Wolves finished the 2019–20 season 11–19, 8–10 in Sun Belt play, to finish in a tie with Appalachian State for seventh place in the conference. They made it to the 2020 Sun Belt Conference women's basketball tournament where they were defeated by South Alabama in the first round. Following the season, all conference tournaments, as well as all postseason play, was cancelled due to the COVID-19 pandemic.

== Offseason ==
=== Departures ===
Name	Number	Pos.	Height	Year	Hometown	Notes
Jada Ford	0	G	5' 9"	Senior	Muskogee, OK	Graduated
Starr Taylor	2	G	5' 6"	Senior	Jonesboro, AR	Graduated
Payton Tennison	5	G	5' 11"	Senior	Valley Springs, AR	Graduated
Shameka Tubbs	21	F	6' 0"	Redshirt junior	Tuscaloosa, AL	Transferred to Sam Houston State
Maggie Mahan	22	G	5' 9"	Junior	Center Ridge, AR	Retired
Madison Heckert	50	F	6' 4"	Senior	Atwood, TN	Graduated

=== Transfers ===
Name	Number	Pos.	Height	Year	Hometown	Old School
Jordyn Brown	5	G	5' 8"	Junior	Clovis, CA	Fresno City College
Seynabou Thiam	21	F/C	6' 6"	Sophomore	Dakar, Senegal	McLennan CC
Karolina Szydlowska	24	F	6' 0"	Junior	Wrocław, Poland	Seward County CC

=== Recruiting ===
College recruiting information
Name	Hometown	School	Height	Weight	Commit date
Hilani Cantone; Guard	Apopka, FL	Apopka HS	5 ft 8 in (1.73 m)	N/A	Oct 4, 2019
Hilani Cantone; Guard	Recruit ratings: No ratings found				
Victoria Dames; Guard/F	Loganville, GA	Grayson HS	6 ft 0 in (1.83 m)	N/A	Aug 18, 2019
Victoria Dames; Guard/F	Recruit ratings: No ratings found				
Mattie Hatcher; Guard	Little Rock, AR	Pulaski Academy	5 ft 5 in (1.65 m)	N/A	
Mattie Hatcher; Guard	Recruit ratings: No ratings found				
Overall recruit ranking:
Note: In many cases, Scout, Rivals, 247Sports, On3, and ESPN may conflict in their listings of height and weight.; In these cases, the average was taken. ESPN grades are on a 100-point scale.; Sources: "Arkansas State 2020-21 Basketball Commits". ESPN.; "2020-21 Team Ranking". Rivals.com.

== Roster ==
2020–21 Arkansas State Red Wolves women's basketball team
Players
Coaches

Pos.	#	Name	Height	Year	Previous school	Hometown
G	1	Jireh Washington	5 ft 9 in (1.75 m)	Jr	Central HS	Memphis, TN
G	2	Hilani Cantone	5 ft 8 in (1.73 m)	Fr	Apopka HS	Apopka, FL
G	3	Morgan Wallace	5 ft 10 in (1.78 m)	Sr	Pulaski Academy	Little Rock, AR
G	4	Mya Love	5 ft 8 in (1.73 m)	So	Nettleton HS	Jonesboro, AR
G	5	Jordyn Brown	5 ft 8 in (1.73 m)	Jr	Clovis North HS; Fresno City College	Clovis, CA
G	10	Jada Stinson	5 ft 8 in (1.73 m)	RS Jr	Elizabethtown HS; Memphis	Elizabethtown, KY
G/F	11	Victoria Dames	6 ft 0 in (1.83 m)	Fr	Grayson HS	Loganville, GA
G	12	Mattie Hatcher	5 ft 5 in (1.65 m)	RS Fr	Pulaski Academy	Little Rock, AR
F	13	Talia Roldan	6 ft 4 in (1.93 m)	RS Jr	Andrean HS; UAB	Merrillville, IN
G	14	Hailee Erickson	5 ft 5 in (1.65 m)	Sr	Alton HS; Three Rivers College	Alton, MO
F/C	21	Seynabou Thiam	6 ft 6 in (1.98 m)	So	Galandou Diouf HS; McLennan CC	Dakar, Senegal
F	23	Trinitee Jackson	6 ft 3 in (1.91 m)	Jr	Christian County HS	Hopkinsville, KY
F	24	Karolina Szydlowska	6 ft 0 in (1.83 m)	Jr	Seward County CC	Wrocław, Poland
F	25	Kayla Williams	6 ft 1 in (1.85 m)	RS Sr	Overton HS; Wichita State	Memphis, TN
F	35	Peyton Martin	5 ft 11 in (1.8 m)	Sr	Watson Chapel HS	Pine Bluff, AR

Head coach

- Matt Daniel (Harding)

Assistant coach(es)

- Destinee Rogers (Arkansas State)
- Weston Jameson (Southern Arkansas)
- Lizzie Nessling (Saint Mary)

Legend

- (C) Team captain
- (S) Suspended
- (I) Ineligible
- (W) Walk-on
- Injured
- Current redshirt

Roster
Last update: December 11, 2020

== Schedule and results ==
Date time, TV	Rank^{#}	Opponent^{#}	Result	Record	High points	High rebounds	High assists	Site city, state
Non-conference regular season
November 27, 2020*; 6:00 p.m., ESPN+		Arkansas–Pine Bluff	L 68–85	0–1	15 – Wallace	8 – Wallace	6 – Stinson	First National Bank Arena (422); Jonesboro, AR
December 2, 2020*; 5:00 p.m., ESPN+		SIU–Edwardsville	W 80–73	1–1	28 – Martin	8 – Martin	8 – Wallace	First National Bank Arena (338); Jonesboro, AR
December 11, 2020*; 5:00 p.m., ESPN+		Williams Baptist	W 96–46	2–1	21 – Stinson	9 – Martin	5 – Washington	First National Bank Arena; Jonesboro, AR
December 15, 2020*; 6:00 p.m., ESPN+		Champion Christian	W 93–49	3–1	12 – Stinson	18 – Thiam	5 – Cantone	First National Bank Arena (207); Jonesboro, AR
December 17, 2020*; 6:00 p.m., ESPN+		Champion Christian	W 88–38	4–1	13 – Love	8 – Stinson	6 – Stinson	First National Bank Arena (189); Jonesboro, AR
January 4, 2021*; 6:00 p.m., ESPN+		Central Baptist	W 85–39	5–1	19 – Martin	11 – Szydlowska	6 – Washington	First National Bank Arena (172); Jonesboro, AR
Conference regular season
January 8, 2021; 6:00 p.m., ESPN+		Texas State	W 54–53	6–1 (1–0)	12 – Wallace	10 – Jackson	3 – Wallace	First National Bank Arena (218); Jonesboro, AR
January 9, 2021; 4:00 p.m., ESPN+		Texas State	W 70–54	7–1 (2–0)	18 – Martin	10 – Wallace	3 – Wallace	First National Bank Arena (303); Jonesboro, AR
January 15, 2021; 6:00 p.m., ESPN+		at Louisiana–Monroe	W 64–50	8–1 (3–0)	24 – Washington	10 – Jackson	4 – Stinson	Fant–Ewing Coliseum (665); Monroe, LA
January 16, 2021; 4:00 p.m., ESPN+		at Louisiana–Monroe	W 59–44	9–1 (4–0)	17 – Washington	9 – Martin	4 – Wallace	Fant–Ewing Coliseum (718); Monroe, LA
January 22, 2021; 6:00 p.m., ESPN+		Louisiana	L 65–67 ^{OT}	9–2 (4–1)	21 – Love	14 – Wallace	3 – Stinson	First National Bank Arena (506); Jonesboro, AR
January 23, 2021; 4:00 p.m., ESPN+		Louisiana	L 58–70	9–3 (4–2)	12 – Szydlowska	10 – Wallace	8 – Stinson	First National Bank Arena (519); Jonesboro, AR
January 29, 2021; 6:00 p.m., ESPN+		at UT Arlington	L 43–62	9–4 (4–3)	14 – Wallace	9 – Wallace	3 – Stinson	College Park Center (624); Arlington, TX
January 30, 2021; 4:00 p.m., ESPN+		at UT Arlington	L 71–80	9–5 (4–4)	24 – Stinson	14 – Wallace	5 – Wallace	College Park Center (624); Arlington, TX
February 5, 2021; 6:00 p.m., ESPN+		at Louisiana	L 49–52	9–6 (4–5)	16 – Stinson	16 – Szydlowska	2 – Wallace	Cajundome (118); Lafayette, LA
February 6, 2021; 2:00 p.m., ESPN+		at Louisiana	L 61–73	9–7 (4–6)	19 – Martin	6 – Szydlowska	4 – Wallace	Cajundome (279); Lafayette, LA
February 12, 2021; 5:00 p.m., ESPN+		Little Rock	L 63–70	9–8 (4–7)	17 – Szydlowska	10 – Wallace	4 – Wallace	First National Bank Arena; Jonesboro, AR
February 13, 2021; 2:00 p.m., ESPN+		at Little Rock	L 56–60 ^{OT}	9–9 (4–8)	13 – Jackson	8 – Wallace	3 – Wallace	Jack Stephens Center; Little Rock, AR
February 19, 2021; 4:00 p.m., ESPN+		at Texas State	Cancelled due to weather concerns					Strahan Arena; San Marcos, TX
February 20, 2021; 4:00 p.m., ESPN+		at Texas State	Cancelled due to weather concerns					Strahan Arena; San Marcos, TX
February 26, 2021; 6:00 p.m., ESPN+		UT Arlington	L 40–60	9–10 (4–9)	13 – Stinson	9 – Martin	3 – Stinson	First National Bank Arena (342); Jonesboro, AR
February 27, 2021; 4:00 p.m., ESPN+		UT Arlington	L 64–75	9–11 (4–10)	17 – Jackson	12 – Jackson	3 – Stinson	First National Bank Arena (367); Jonesboro, AR
Sun Belt tournament
March 5, 2021; 2:00 p.m., ESPN+	(W5)	vs. (E4) South Alabama; First round	L 64–73	9–12	16 – Szydlowska	7 – Szydlowska	5 – Stinson	Hartsell Arena (166); Pensacola, FL
*Non-conference game. ^{#}Rankings from AP poll. (#) Tournament seedings in parentheses. All times are in Central.

== See also ==
- 2020–21 Arkansas State Red Wolves men's basketball team
