= 2020–21 Louisiana–Monroe Warhawks women's basketball team =

Intercollegiate basketball season

2020–21 Louisiana–Monroe Warhawks women's basketball
- Conference: Sun Belt Conference
- Record: 3–20 (1–15 Sun Belt)
- Head coach: Brooks Donald-Williams (1st season)
- Assistant coaches: Christie Sides; Jessica Barber; Amber Donnes
- Home arena: Fant–Ewing Coliseum

2020–21 Sun Belt Conference women's basketball standings
	Conf.				Overall
Team	W		L	PCT	W		L	PCT
East
Troy †	15	–	2	.882	22	–	6	.786
Georgia State	9	–	7	.563	13	–	11	.542
Appalachian State	10	–	8	.556	15	–	12	.556
South Alabama	9	–	9	.500	13	–	13	.500
Georgia Southern	5	–	9	.357	11	–	13	.458
Coastal Carolina	0	–	13	.000	3	–	15	.167
West
Louisiana	13	–	1	.929	16	–	7	.696
UT Arlington	11	–	4	.733	13	–	7	.650
Little Rock	9	–	7	.563	15	–	11	.577
Texas State	7	–	8	.467	11	–	11	.500
Arkansas State	4	–	10	.286	9	–	12	.429
Louisiana–Monroe	1	–	15	.063	2	–	20	.091
† 2021 Sun Belt tournament winner As of July 7, 2024; Rankings from AP poll

The 2020–21 Louisiana–Monroe Warhawks women's basketball team represented the University of Louisiana at Monroe during the 2020–21 NCAA Division I women's basketball season. The basketball team, led by first-year head coach Brooks Donald Williams, played all home games at the Fant–Ewing Coliseum along with the Louisiana–Monroe Warhawks men's basketball team. They were members of the Sun Belt Conference.

== Previous season ==
The Warhawks finished the 2019–20 season 3–26, 1–17 in Sun Belt play to finish eleventh in the conference. They failed to make it to the 2019-20 Sun Belt Conference women's basketball tournament. Following the season, all conference tournaments as well as all postseason play was cancelled due to the COVID-19 pandemic.

== Offseason ==
=== Departures ===
Name	Number	Pos.	Height	Year	Hometown	Notes
Amber Thompson	1	G	5'9"	Senior	Dyersburg, Tennessee	Graduated
Destini Lunsford	13	G	5'7"	Senior	Corsicana, Texas	Graduated
Lauren Fitch	22	G	5'6"	Senior	Decauter, Alabama	Graduated
Jamie Means	35	F	6'1"	Sophomore	Little Elm, Texas	Retired

=== Transfers ===
Name	Number	Pos.	Height	Year	Hometown	Old School
Kierra Brimzly	25	G	5'9"	Redshirt Junior	Natchitoches, Louisiana	Tyler JC

=== Recruiting ===
College recruiting information
Name	Hometown	High school / college	Height	Weight	Commit date
Morgan Hill; Forward	Houston, TX	Cypress Creek HS	6 ft 3 in (1.91 m)	N/A	Nov 19, 2019
Morgan Hill; Forward	Star ratings: Rivals: N/A 247Sports: N/A				
Gracen Williams; Guard	McKinney, TX	Homeschool of Dallas	5 ft 7 in (1.70 m)	N/A	Jul 15, 2019
Gracen Williams; Guard	Star ratings: Rivals: N/A 247Sports: N/A				
Kyren Whittington; Guard	Folsom, LA	Northlake Christian	5 ft 9 in (1.75 m)	N/A	Sep 1, 2019
Kyren Whittington; Guard	Star ratings: Rivals: N/A 247Sports: N/A				
Tequaza "Qua" Chambers; Guard	Plain Dealing, LA	Benton HS	5 ft 8 in (1.73 m)	N/A	Apr 15, 2020
Tequaza "Qua" Chambers; Guard	Star ratings: Rivals: N/A 247Sports: N/A				
Tasionna McDowell; Guard/forward	Delhi, LA	Delhi HS	6 ft 1 in (1.85 m)	N/A	Nov 14, 2019
Tasionna McDowell; Guard/forward	Star ratings: Rivals: N/A 247Sports: N/A				
Sadie Williams; Guard	Gonzales, LA	East Ascension HS	5 ft 10 in (1.78 m)	N/A	Aug 31, 2019
Sadie Williams; Guard	Star ratings: Rivals: N/A 247Sports: N/A				
Hannah Edwards; Center	Birmingham, AL	Oak Mountain HS	6 ft 6 in (1.98 m)	N/A	Sep 30, 2019
Hannah Edwards; Center	Star ratings: Rivals: N/A 247Sports: N/A				
Overall recruiting rankings:
Note: In many cases, Scout, Rivals, 247Sports, and ESPN may conflict in their listings of height and weight.; In these cases, the average was taken. ESPN grades are on a 100-point scale.; Sources: "Louisiana–Monroe 2020-21 Basketball Commits". ESPN.com.; "2020-21 Team Ranking". Rivals.com.

== Roster ==
2020–21 Louisiana–Monroe Warhawks women's basketball team
Players
Coaches

Pos.	#	Name	Height	Year	Previous school	Hometown
G	2	Gara Beth Self	5 ft 8 in (1.73 m)	So	Ingomar HS	New Albany, MS
G	3	Linda van Schaik	5 ft 10 in (1.78 m)	So	Orange Angels Academy	South Holland, Netherlands
F	4	Kierra Crockett	6 ft 0 in (1.83 m)	RS Sr	North Farmington Hills High School; Independence CC	Farmington Hills, MI
G	10	Maddi Gatte	5 ft 9 in (1.75 m)	Jr	Iota HS; Southwest CC	Egan, LA
G/F	11	Whitney Goins	6 ft 0 in (1.83 m)	Sr	Anacoco HS	Anacoco, LA
F	12	Morgan Hill	6 ft 3 in (1.91 m)	Fr	Cypress Creek HS	Houston, TX
G	13	Gracen Williams	5 ft 7 in (1.7 m)	Fr	Homeschool of Dallas	McKinney, TX
G	21	Kyren Whittington	5 ft 9 in (1.75 m)	Fr	Northlake Christian	Folsom, LA
G	22	Qua Chambers	5 ft 8 in (1.73 m)	Fr	Benton HS	Plain Dealing, LA
G/F	23	Tasionna McDowell	6 ft 1 in (1.85 m)	Fr	Delhi HS	Delhi, LA
C	24	Diamond Brooks	6 ft 2 in (1.88 m)	Sr	Jewel M. Sumner HS	Kentwood, LA
G	25	Kierra Brimzy	5 ft 9 in (1.75 m)	RS Jr	Natchitoches Central HS; Tyler JC	Natchitoches, LA
G	32	Sadie Williams	5 ft 10 in (1.78 m)	Fr	East Ascension HS	Gonzales, LA
C	40	Hannah Edwards	6 ft 6 in (1.98 m)	Fr	Oak Mountain HS	Birmingham, AL

Head coach

- Brooks Donald-Williams (Mississippi State)

Assistant coach(es)

- Christie Sides (Louisiana Tech)
- Jessica Barber (Mobile)
- Amber Donnes (McNeese State)

Legend

- (C) Team captain
- (S) Suspended
- (I) Ineligible
- (W) Walk-on
- Injured
- Current redshirt

Roster
Last update: 12 December 2020

== Schedule and results ==
Date time, TV	Rank^{#}	Opponent^{#}	Result	Record	High points	High rebounds	High assists	Site city, state
Non-conference Regular Season
12/03/2020*; 5:30 p.m., SECN		at No. 16 Arkansas	L 50–103	0–1	11 – Goins	11 – Crockett	3 – G. Williams	Bud Walton Arena (1,366); Fayetteville, AR
12/06/2020*; 2:00 p.m., ESPN+		Louisiana College	W 96–48	1–1	15 – Brimzy	12 – McDowell	5 – G. Williams	Fant–Ewing Coliseum (797); Monroe, LA
12/10/2020*; 6:00 p.m., ESPN+		Grambling State	L 42–66	1–2	11 – Brimzy	9 – Crockett	2 – Self	Fant–Ewing Coliseum (738); Monroe, LA
12/12/2020*; 1:00 p.m.		vs. Northwestern State	W 68–55	2–2	24 – Brimzy	13 – Crockett	5 – Self	Prather Coliseum (419); Natchitoches, LA
12/15/2020*; 6:00 p.m., ESPN+		Mississippi Valley State	L 51–53	2–3	16 – van Schaik	9 – Brooks	4 – Self	Fant–Ewing Coliseum (716); Monroe, LA
12/17/2020*; 6:30 p.m., CUSA.TV		at Louisiana Tech	L 45–63	2–4	16 – Brimzy	7 – Crockett	2 – Self	Thomas Assembly Center (1,200); Ruston, LA
Conference Regular Season
01/08/2021; 6:00 p.m., ESPN+		at UT Arlington	L 37–82	2–5 (0–1)	16 – Brimzy	8 – Crockett	2 – Self	College Park Center (624); Arlington, TX
01/09/2021; 4:00 p.m., ESPN+		at UT Arlington	L 37–61	2–6 (0–2)	10 – Brooks	15 – Crockett	4 – Self	College Park Center (624); Arlington, TX
01/15/2021; 6:00 p.m., ESPN+		Arkansas State	L 50–64	2–7 (0–3)	13 – Brimzy	4 – Crockett	5 – G. Williams	Fant–Ewing Coliseum (665); Monroe, LA
01/16/2021; 4:00 p.m., ESPN+		Arkansas State	L 44–59	2–8 (0–4)	10 – Goins	14 – Crockett	4 – G. Williams	Fant–Ewing Coliseum (718); Monroe, LA
01/22/2021; 4:00 p.m., ESPN+		at Texas State	L 52–74	2–9 (0–5)	16 – Brimzy	8 – Crockett	2 – van Schaik	Strahan Arena (559); San Marcos, TX
01/23/2021; 4:00 p.m., ESPN+		at Texas State	L 50–64	2–10 (0–6)	24 – Brimzy	8 – Crockett	3 – Goins	Strahan Arena (532); San Marcos, TX
01/29/2021; 2:00 p.m., ESPN+		at Little Rock	L 36–71	2–11 (0–7)	12 – Goins	8 – Crockett	2 – Crockett	Jack Stephens Center (226); Little Rock, AR
01/30/2021; 1:00 p.m., ESPN+		at Little Rock	L 42–67	2–12 (0–8)	17 – Goins	5 – Brooks	2 – Self	Jack Stephens Center; Little Rock, AR
02/05/2021; 6:00 p.m., ESPN+		UT Arlington	L 60–72	2–13 (0–9)	22 – Brimzy	8 – Crockett	5 – Self	Fant–Ewing Coliseum (652); Monroe, LA
02/06/2021; 4:00 p.m., ESPN+		UT Arlington	L 39–64	2–14 (0–10)	15 – van Schaik	10 – Crockett	3 – Self	Fant–Ewing Coliseum (637); Monroe, LA
02/11/2021; 3:00 p.m., ESPN+		at Louisiana	L 51–65	2–15 (0–11)	11 – Hill	10 – Crockett	5 – G. Williams	Cajundome (183); Lafayette, LA
02/13/2021; 1:00 p.m., ESPN+		Louisiana	L 59–64	2–16 (0–12)	23 – Brimzy	10 – Hill	6 – van Schaik	Fant–Ewing Coliseum; Monroe, LA
02/15/2021; 6:00 p.m., ESPN+		at Arkansas State	Cancelled due to weather concerns					First National Bank Arena; Jonesboro, AR
02/21/2021; 1:00 p.m., ESPN+		Little Rock	L 46–66	2–17 (0–13)	16 – Brimzy	6 – Crockett	3 – G. Williams	Fant–Ewing Coliseum; Monroe, LA
02/22/2021; 1:00 p.m., ESPN+		Little Rock	W 66–42	3–17 (1–13)	19 – van Schaik	8 – van Schaik	8 – G. Williams	Fant–Ewing Coliseum; Monroe, LA
02/26/2021; 6:00 p.m., ESPN+		Texas State	L 62–85	3–18 (1–14)	16 – Self	6 – TEAM	4 – Brimzy	Fant–Ewing Coliseum; Monroe, LA
02/27/2021; 4:00 p.m., ESPN3		Texas State	L 56–68	3–19 (1–15)	15 – Brimzy	7 – Goins	7 – Brimzy	Fant–Ewing Coliseum (654); Monroe, LA
Sun Belt Tournament
03/05/2021; 11:00 am, ESPN+	(W6)	vs. (E3) Appalachian State; First Round	L 60–70	3–20	22 – Brimzy	8 – Brooks	3 – Goins	Pensacola Bay Center; Pensacola, FL
*Non-conference game. ^{#}Rankings from AP Poll. (#) Tournament seedings in parentheses. All times are in Central Time.

== See also ==
- 2020–21 Louisiana–Monroe Warhawks men's basketball team
