= 2020–21 Coastal Carolina Chanticleers women's basketball team =

Intercollegiate basketball season

2020–21 Coastal Carolina Chanticleers women's basketball
- Conference: Sun Belt Conference
- Record: 3–15 (0–13 Sun Belt)
- Head coach: Jaida Williams (7th season)
- Assistant coaches: Vanessa Taylor; AJ Jordan; Torrie Cash
- Home arena: HTC Center

2020–21 Sun Belt Conference women's basketball standings
	Conf.				Overall
Team	W		L	PCT	W		L	PCT
East
Troy †	15	–	2	.882	22	–	6	.786
Georgia State	9	–	7	.563	13	–	11	.542
Appalachian State	10	–	8	.556	15	–	12	.556
South Alabama	9	–	9	.500	13	–	13	.500
Georgia Southern	5	–	9	.357	11	–	13	.458
Coastal Carolina	0	–	13	.000	3	–	15	.167
West
Louisiana	13	–	1	.929	16	–	7	.696
UT Arlington	11	–	4	.733	13	–	7	.650
Little Rock	9	–	7	.563	15	–	11	.577
Texas State	7	–	8	.467	11	–	11	.500
Arkansas State	4	–	10	.286	9	–	12	.429
Louisiana–Monroe	1	–	15	.063	2	–	20	.091
† 2021 Sun Belt tournament winner

The 2020–21 Coastal Carolina Chanticleers women's basketball team represented Coastal Carolina University during the 2020–21 NCAA Division I women's basketball season. The basketball team, led by seventh-year head coach Jaida Williams, played all home games at the HTC Center along with the Coastal Carolina Chanticleers men's basketball team. They were members of the Sun Belt Conference.

== Previous season ==
The Chanticleers finished the 2019–20 season 25–4, 15–3 in Sun Belt play to finish second in the conference. They made it to the 2019-20 Sun Belt Conference women's basketball tournament where they received a first round bye and were scheduled to play South Alabama in the Quarterfinals. However, before the game could commence, the remainder of the tournament as well as all postseason play was cancelled due to the COVID-19 pandemic.

== Offseason ==
=== Departures ===
Name	Number	Pos.	Height	Year	Hometown	Notes
Torrie Cash	3	G	5'6"	Senior	Pittsburgh, Pennsylvania	Graduated
Zacharyia Esmon	22	G	5'9"	Junior	Franklin, Tennessee	Retired
Caitlin Roche	23	G	5'8"	Senior	Montvale, New Jersey	Graduated
Naheria Hamilton	30	G	5'11"	Senior	Safford, Alabama	Graduated
DJ Williams	32	G	5'10"	Senior	Moreno Valley, California	Graduated

=== Transfers ===
Name	Number	Pos.	Height	Year	Hometown	Old School
Deaja Richardson	5	G	5'9"	Sophomore	Kernersville, NC	Tennessee State
Tyra Brown	12	G	5'6"	Junior	St. Louis, MO	Jefferson College
Olivia Smith	15	G	6'0"	Graduate Student	Raleigh, NC	North Carolina
Ashley Saintigene	23	F	6'1"	Graduate Student	Lauderdale Lakes, FL	Marshall

=== Recruiting ===
College recruiting information
Name	Hometown	School	Height	Weight	Commit date
Brali Simmons; Guard	Memphis, TN	St. Agnes Academy	5 ft 8 in (1.73 m)	N/A	Aug 6, 2020
Brali Simmons; Guard	Recruit ratings: No ratings found				
Marieme Diouf; Guard	Rufisque, Senegal	Greenforest Academy	5 ft 7 in (1.70 m)	N/A	Apr 27, 2020
Marieme Diouf; Guard	Recruit ratings: No ratings found				
Overall recruit ranking:
Note: In many cases, Scout, Rivals, 247Sports, On3, and ESPN may conflict in their listings of height and weight.; In these cases, the average was taken. ESPN grades are on a 100-point scale.; Sources: "Coastal Carolina 2020-21 Basketball Commits". ESPN.; "2020-21 Team Ranking". Rivals.com.

== Roster ==
2020–21 Coastal Carolina Chanticleers women's basketball team
Players
Coaches

Pos.	#	Name	Height	Year	Previous school	Hometown
G	0	Alana Denson	5 ft 7 in (1.7 m)	So	Forest Park HS	Atlanta, GA
G	1	Brali Simmons	5 ft 8 in (1.73 m)	Fr	St. Agnes Academy	Memphis, TN
G	3	Marieme Diouf	5 ft 7 in (1.7 m)	Fr	Greenforest Academy	Rufisque, Senegal
G	4	Tiarra Davis	5 ft 6 in (1.68 m)	Sr	Holy Names Catholic HS	Windsor, Ontario
G	5	Deaja Richardson	5 ft 9 in (1.75 m)	So	Westridge Academy; Tennessee State	Kernersville, NC
C	10	Janeen Camp	6 ft 5 in (1.96 m)	Jr	TPLS Christian; Towson	Portsmouth, VA
G	11	Kiara Norman	5 ft 4 in (1.63 m)	Sr	Norfolk Christian HS	Virginia Beach, VA
G	12	Tyra Brown	5 ft 6 in (1.68 m)	Jr	Pattonville HS; Jefferson College	St. Louis, MO
G	14	Kaylin West	5 ft 7 in (1.7 m)	Sr	Liberty IMG Academy	Bethlehem, PA
G	15	Olivia Smith	6 ft 0 in (1.83 m)	Sr	Cardinal Gibbons HS; North Carolina	Raleigh, NC
F	20	Janae Camp	6 ft 1 in (1.85 m)	Sr	TPLS Christian Academy	Portsmouth, VA
F	21	Aja Blount	5 ft 11 in (1.8 m)	Jr	Northhampton IMG Academy	Northampton, PA
F	23	Ashley Saintigene	6 ft 1 in (1.85 m)	Sr	Northeast HS; Marshall	Lauderdale Lakes, FL
C	33	Bailey Lewis	6 ft 5 in (1.96 m)	So	Liberty Christian	Sanger, TX
F	54	Alise Davis	5 ft 11 in (1.8 m)	Sr	Tampa Catholic HS	Tampa, FL

Head coach

- Jaida Williams (Cal Poly Pomona)

Assistant coach(es)

- Vanessa Taylor (Hampton)
- AJ Jordan (Coastal Carolina)
- Torrie Cash (Coastal Carolina)

Legend

- (C) Team captain
- (S) Suspended
- (I) Ineligible
- (W) Walk-on
- Injured
- Current redshirt

Roster
Last update: 11 December 2020

== Schedule and results ==
Date time, TV	Rank^{#}	Opponent^{#}	Result	Record	High points	High rebounds	High assists	Site city, state
Non-conference Regular Season
11/28/2020*; 1:00 p.m., ESPN+		South Carolina State	W 85–56	1–0	17 – Blount	8 – Blount	7 – Brown	HTC Center (121); Conway, SC
12.06/2020*; 2:00 p.m., ACCN+		at No. 8 NC State	L 46–98	1–1	13 – Blount	9 – Blount	3 – Brown	Reynolds Coliseum (25); Raleigh, NC
12/10/2020*; 6:00 p.m., ESPN+		UNC Pembroke	W 67–59	2–1	29 – Blount	11 – Blount	3 – Denson	HTC Center (93); Conway, SC
12/11/2020*; 6:00 p.m., ESPN+		UNC Pembroke	W 66–60	3–1	14 – Brown	11 – Jana. Camp	5 – Denson	HTC Center (83); Conway, SC
Conference Regular Season
01/08/2021; 6:00 p.m., ESPN+		at South Alabama	L 57–68	3–2 (0–1)	11 – Blount	9 – Saintgene	4 – West	Mitchell Center (265); Mobile, AL
01/09/2021; 3:00 p.m., ESPN+		at South Alabama	L 52–55	3–3 (0–2)	10 – Davis	10 – Saintgene	5 – Brown	Mitchell Center (288); Mobile, AL
01/15/2021; 6:00 p.m., ESPN+		Georgia State	L 55–73	3–4 (0–3)	15 – Richardson	11 – Blount	3 – Denson	HTC Center (71); Conway, SC
01/16/2021; 4:00 p.m., ESPN+		Georgia State	L 65–76	3–5 (0–4)	18 – Richardson	10 – Blount	4 – Denson	HTC Center (63); Conway, SC
01/22/2021; 7:00 p.m., ESPN+		at Troy	L 59–104	3–6 (0–5)	17 – Blount	10 – Jana. Camp	6 – West	Trojan Arena (877); Troy, AL
01/23/2021; 5:00 p.m., ESPN+		at Troy	L 53–84	3–7 (0–6)	19 – Blount	6 – West	6 – Brown	Trojan Arena (846); Troy, AL
02/06/2021; 1:00 p.m., ESPN+		South Alabama	L 75–95	3–8 (0–7)	17 – Richardson	7 – Jana. Camp	4 – Brown	HTC Center (73); Conway, SC
02/07/2021; 1:00 p.m., ESPN+		South Alabama	L 56–61	3–9 (0–8)	19 – Blount	11 – Jana. Camp	3 – Richardson	HTC Center (83); Conway, SC
02/10/2021; 6:00 p.m., ESPN+		Appalachian State	L 58–72	3–10 (0–9)	30 – Blount	11 – Blount	3 – Brown	HTC Center (63); Conway, SC
02/13/2021; 4:00 p.m., ESPN+		at Appalachian State	L 65–79	3–11 (0–10)	27 – Richardson	12 – Blount	4 – West	Holmes Center (25); Boone, NC
02/16/2021; 4:00 p.m., ESPN+		Georgia Southern	Cancelled due to weather concerns					HTC Center; Conway, SC
02/19/2021; 6:00 p.m., ESPN+		at Georgia Southern	Cancelled due to weather concerns					Hanner Fieldhouse; Statesboro, GA
02/20/2021; 4:00 p.m., ESPN+		at Georgia Southern	Cancelled due to weather concerns					Hanner Fieldhouse; Statesboro, GA
02/23/2021; 2:00 p.m., ESPN+		at Georgia State	L 68–73	3–12 (0–11)	21 – Richardson	19 – Blount	4 – Brown	GSU Sports Arena (371); Atlanta, GA
02/26/2021; 6:00 p.m., ESPN+		Troy	L 82–97	3–13 (0–12)	20 – West	10 – Blount	5 – West	HTC Center (113); Conway, SC
02/27/2021; 4:00 p.m., ESPN+		Troy	L 89–103	3–14 (0–13)	27 – Richardson	9 – Blount	5 – West	HTC Center (84); Conway, SC
Sun Belt Tournament
03/05/2021; 2:30 pm, ESPN+	(E6)	vs. (W3) Little Rock; First Round	L 64–75	3–15	18 – Richardson	9 – Jana. Camp	6 – Brown	Pensacola Bay Center; Pensacola, FL
*Non-conference game. ^{#}Rankings from AP Poll. (#) Tournament seedings in parentheses. All times are in Eastern Time.

== See also ==
- 2020–21 Coastal Carolina Chanticleers men's basketball team
