= 2020–21 Appalachian State Mountaineers women's basketball team =

Intercollegiate basketball season

2020–21 Appalachian State Mountaineers women's basketball
- Conference: Sun Belt Conference
- Record: 15–12 (10–8 Sun Belt)
- Head coach: Angel Elderkin (7th season)
- Assistant coaches: Sam Pierce Jr.; Kate Dempsey; Cristina Centeno
- Home arena: Holmes Center

2020–21 Sun Belt Conference women's basketball standings
	Conf.				Overall
Team	W		L	PCT	W		L	PCT
East
Troy †	15	–	2	.882	22	–	6	.786
Georgia State	9	–	7	.563	13	–	11	.542
Appalachian State	10	–	8	.556	15	–	12	.556
South Alabama	9	–	9	.500	13	–	13	.500
Georgia Southern	5	–	9	.357	11	–	13	.458
Coastal Carolina	0	–	13	.000	3	–	15	.167
West
Louisiana	13	–	1	.929	16	–	7	.696
UT Arlington	11	–	4	.733	13	–	7	.650
Little Rock	9	–	7	.563	15	–	11	.577
Texas State	7	–	8	.467	11	–	11	.500
Arkansas State	4	–	10	.286	9	–	12	.429
Louisiana–Monroe	1	–	15	.063	2	–	20	.091
† 2021 Sun Belt tournament winner

The 2020–21 Appalachian State Mountaineers women's basketball team represented Appalachian State University during the 2020–21 NCAA Division I women's basketball season. The basketball team, led by second-year head coach Dustin Kerns, played all home games at the Holmes Center along with the Appalachian State Mountaineers men's basketball team. They were members of the Sun Belt Conference.

== Previous season ==
The Mountaineers finished the 2019–20 season 11–19, 8–10 in Sun Belt play to finish eighth place in the conference. They made it to the 2019-20 Sun Belt Conference women's basketball tournament where they were defeated by Little Rock in the First Round. Shortly after their elimination, the remainder of the tournament as well as all postseason play was cancelled due to the COVID-19 pandemic.

== Offseason ==
=== Departures ===
Name	Number	Pos.	Height	Year	Hometown	Notes
Nicola Mathews	4	G	5'8"	Senior	Adelaide, Australia	Graduated
Armani Hampton	14	G/F	5'11"	Senior	Winston–Salem, North Carolina	Graduated
Ashley Polacek	23	G	5'5"	Redshirt Senior	Ottawa, Canada	Graduated
Bayley Plummer	42	C/F	6'4"	Senior	Thomasville, North Carolina	Graduated

=== Recruiting ===
College recruiting information
Name	Hometown	School	Height	Weight	Commit date
Dane Bertolina; Guard	Charlotte, NC	Charlotte Catholic HS	5 ft 10 in (1.78 m)	N/A	Jan 25, 2019
Dane Bertolina; Guard	Recruit ratings: No ratings found				
Faith Alston; Guard	Centerville, VA	Paul VI Catholic HS	5 ft 7 in (1.70 m)	N/A	Aug 7, 2019
Faith Alston; Guard	Recruit ratings: No ratings found				
Overall recruit ranking:
Note: In many cases, Scout, Rivals, 247Sports, On3, and ESPN may conflict in their listings of height and weight.; In these cases, the average was taken. ESPN grades are on a 100-point scale.; Sources: "Appalachian State 2020-21 Basketball Commits". ESPN.; "2020-21 Team Ranking". Rivals.com.

== Roster ==
2020–21 Appalachian State Mountaineers women's basketball team
Players
Coaches

Pos.	#	Name	Height	Year	Previous school	Hometown
PF	1	Maya Calder	6 ft 0 in (1.83 m)	Sr	National Christian	Landover, MD
F	1	A'Lea Gilbert	6 ft 0 in (1.83 m)	RS Fr	South Mecklenburg HS	Charlotte, NC
G	3	Tierra Wilson	5 ft 8 in (1.73 m)	RS Jr	RJ Reynolds HS	Winston–Salem, NC
G	4	Dane Bertolina	5 ft 10 in (1.78 m)	Fr	Charlotte Catholic HS	Charlotte, NC
G	5	Pre Stanley	5 ft 9 in (1.75 m)	Sr	Rockledge HS	Rockledge, FL
G	10	Michaela Porter	5 ft 10 in (1.78 m)	Sr	Obama Academy	Pittsburgh, PA
G	11	Faith Alston	5 ft 7 in (1.7 m)	Fr	Paul VI Catholic HS	Centerville, VA
F	15	Emma Newton	5 ft 9 in (1.75 m)	RS So	Asheville Christian	Asheville, NC
G	20	Brooke Bigott	5 ft 10 in (1.78 m)	Jr	Seven Lakes HS	Katy, TX
G	23	Zahra Daniel	5 ft 9 in (1.75 m)	Sr	Miami Central HS	Miami, FL
G	24	Janay Sanders	5 ft 10 in (1.78 m)	RS So	Mallard Creek HS	Charlotte, NC
	30	Lainey Gosnell	6 ft 1 in (1.85 m)	Sr	Habersham Central HS	Demorest, GA
F	44	Haile McDonald	6 ft 2 in (1.88 m)	Jr	Millbrook HS	Winchester, VA
F	50	Jackie Christ	6 ft 3 in (1.91 m)	So	Dominion HS	Sterling, VA

Head coach

- Angel Elderkin (Southern Maine)

Assistant coach(es)

- Sam Pierce Jr. (Slippery Rock)
- Kate Dempsey (Wofford)
- Cristina Centeno (Siena)

Legend

- (C) Team captain
- (S) Suspended
- (I) Ineligible
- (W) Walk-on
- Injured
- Current redshirt

Roster
Last update: 10 December 2020

== Schedule and results ==
Date time, TV	Rank^{#}	Opponent^{#}	Result	Record	High points	High rebounds	High assists	Site city, state
Non-conference Regular Season
11/25/2020*; 2:00 p.m., ESPN+		Charlotte	W 74–68	1–0	20 – Stanley	11 – Porter	7 – Stanley	Holmes Center; Boone, NC
11/29/2020*; 2:00 p.m., ESPN+		UNC Asheville	W 70–60	2–0	25 – Stanley	13 – Gosnell	2 – Porter	Holmes Center (25); Boone, NC
12/04/2020*; 4:00 p.m., ACC Network		at Virginia Tech	L 59–84	2–1	17 – Stanley	9 – TEAM	7 – Alston	Cassell Coliseum (250); Blacksburg, VA
12/11/2020*; 6:00 p.m., ESPN+		Davidson	L 64–67	2–2	26 – Stanley	10 – Gosnell	3 – Bigott	Holmes Center (25); Boone, NC
12/20/2020*; 2:00 p.m., ESPN+		at East Tennessee State	W 69–66	3–2	16 – Stanley	7 – Porter	3 – Stanley	J. Madison Brooks Gymnasium; Johnson City, TN
12/22/2020*; 12:00 p.m., SECN+		at RV Georgia	L 44–107	3–3	12 – Gosnell	5 – Gosnell	2 – Sanders	Stegeman Coliseum (625); Athens, GA
Conference Regular Season
01/01/2021; 7:00 p.m., ESPN+		at Troy	W 78–66	4–3 (1–0)	24 – Stanley	14 – Porter	7 – Stanley	Trojan Arena (752); Troy, AL
01/02/2021; 5:00 p.m., ESPN+		at Troy	L 65–85	4–4 (1–1)	13 – Gosnell	7 – Porter	5 – Alston	Trojan Arena (773); Troy, AL
01/08/2021; 6:00 p.m., ESPN+		at Georgia Southern	L 56–87	4–5 (1–2)	13 – Porter	7 – Porter	6 – Alston	Hanner Fieldhouse (231); Statesboro, GA
01/09/2021; 4:00 p.m., ESPN+		at Georgia Southern	W 70–58	5–5 (2–2)	17 – Bigott	11 – Bigott	4 – Stanley	Hanner Fieldhouse (213); Statesboro, GA
01/15/2021; 6:00 p.m., ESPN+		South Alabama	L 63–66	5–6 (2–3)	18 – Stanley	10 – Gosnell	3 – Stanley	Holmes Center (55); Boone, NC
01/16/2021; 4:00 p.m., ESPN+		South Alabama	W 71–52	6–6 (3–3)	16 – Porter	9 – Porter	4 – Stanley	Holmes Center (50); Boone, NC
01/22/2021; 6:00 p.m., ESPN+		at Georgia State	W 71–68	7–6 (4–3)	26 – Stanley	8 – Stanley	3 – Stanley	GSU Sports Arena (488); Atlanta, GA
01/23/2021; 2:00 p.m., ESPN+		at Georgia State	W 66–56	8–6 (5–3)	29 – Stanley	13 – Porter	3 – Stanley	GSU Sports Arena (445); Atlanta, GA
01/29/2021; 6:00 p.m., ESPN+		Troy	L 60–80	8–7 (5–4)	18 – Gosnell	7 – Porter	5 – Bigott	Holmes Center (50); Boone, NC
01/30/2021; 2:00 p.m., ESPN+		Troy	L 52–74	8–8 (5–5)	15 – Sanders	7 – Calder	2 – Alston	Holmes Center (50); Boone, NC
02/05/2021; 6:00 p.m., ESPN+		Georgia State	L 62–72	8–9 (5–6)	21 – Gosnell	8 – Gosnell	3 – Alston	Holmes Center (55); Boone, NC
02/06/2021; 4:00 p.m., ESPN+		Georgia State	L 48–50	8–10 (5–7)	14 – Gosnell	10 – Gosnell	4 – Stanley	Holmes Center (55); Boone, NC
02/10/2021; 6:00 p.m., ESPN+		at Coastal Carolina	W 72–58	9–10 (6–7)	23 – Bigott	9 – Porter	5 – Sanders	HTC Center (63); Conway, SC
02/13/2021; 4:00 p.m., ESPN+		Coastal Carolina	W 79–65	10–10 (7–7)	16 – Gosnell	8 – Stanley	4 – Stanley	Holmes Center (25); Boone, NC
02/19/2021; 6:00 p.m., ESPN+		at South Alabama	L 51–56	10–11 (7–8)	16 – Sanders	12 – Gosnell	4 – Alston	Mitchell Center (334); Mobile, AL
02/20/2021; 3:00 p.m., ESPN+		at South Alabama	W 58–56	11–11 (8–8)	17 – Stanley	8 – Stanley	2 – Porter	Mitchell Center (343); Mobile, AL
02/26/2021; 6:00 p.m., ESPN+		Georgia Southern	W 77–66	12–11 (9–8)	18 – Stanley	10 – Gosnell	6 – Stanley	Holmes Center (47); Boone, NC
02/27/2021; 4:00 p.m., ESPN+		Georgia Southern	W 81–78	13–11 (10–8)	23 – Gosnell	9 – Gosnell	4 – Stanley	Holmes Center (86); Boone, NC
Sun Belt Tournament
03/05/2021; 12:00 pm, ESPN+	(E3)	vs. (W6) Louisiana–Monroe; First Round	W 70–60	14–11	14 – Porter	9 – Gosnell	7 – Alston	Pensacola Bay Center; Pensacola, FL
03/06/2021; 12:30 pm, ESPN+	(E3)	vs. (W2) UT Arlington; Quarterfinals	W 54–46	15–11	24 – Stanley	9 – Bigott	2 – Stanley	Hartsell Arena (148); Pensacola, FL
03/07/2021; 12:00 pm, ESPN+	(E3)	vs. (E1) Troy; Semifinals	L 63–66	15–12	29 – Stanley	14 – Stanley	3 – Alston	Pensacola Bay Center; Pensacola, FL
*Non-conference game. ^{#}Rankings from AP Poll. (#) Tournament seedings in parentheses. All times are in Eastern Time.

== See also ==
- 2020–21 Appalachian State Mountaineers men's basketball team
