= 2020–21 South Alabama Jaguars women's basketball team =

Intercollegiate basketball season

2020–21 South Alabama Jaguars women's basketball
- Conference: Sun Belt Conference
- Record: 13–13 (9–9 Sun Belt)
- Head coach: Terry Fowler (7th season)
- Assistant coaches: Dan Presel; Rachel Travis; Mansa El
- Home arena: Mitchell Center

2020–21 Sun Belt Conference women's basketball standings
	Conf.				Overall
Team	W		L	PCT	W		L	PCT
East
Troy †	15	–	2	.882	22	–	6	.786
Georgia State	9	–	7	.563	13	–	11	.542
Appalachian State	10	–	8	.556	15	–	12	.556
South Alabama	9	–	9	.500	13	–	13	.500
Georgia Southern	5	–	9	.357	11	–	13	.458
Coastal Carolina	0	–	13	.000	3	–	15	.167
West
Louisiana	13	–	1	.929	16	–	7	.696
UT Arlington	11	–	4	.733	13	–	7	.650
Little Rock	9	–	7	.563	15	–	11	.577
Texas State	7	–	8	.467	11	–	11	.500
Arkansas State	4	–	10	.286	9	–	12	.429
Louisiana–Monroe	1	–	15	.063	2	–	20	.091
† 2021 Sun Belt tournament winner

The 2020–21 South Alabama Jaguars women's basketball team represented the University of South Alabama during the 2020–21 NCAA Division I women's basketball season. The basketball team, led by seventh-year head coach Terry Fowler, played all home games at the Mitchell Center along with the South Alabama Jaguars men's basketball team. They were members of the Sun Belt Conference.

== Previous season ==
The Jaguars finished the 2019–20 season 16–16, 9–9 in Sun Belt play to finish fifth place in the conference. They made it to the 2019-20 Sun Belt Conference women's basketball tournament where they defeated Arkansas State in the First Round and UT Arlington in the Quarterfinals. Following their victory, the remainder of the tournament as well as all postseason play was cancelled due to the COVID-19 pandemic.

== Offseason ==
=== Departures ===
Name	Number	Pos.	Height	Year	Hometown	Notes
Shaforia Kines	2	G	5'5"	Senior	Birmingham, Alabama	Graduated
Emerald Hart	5	G	5'9"	Senior	Riviera Beach, Florida	Graduated
Demaya Telemaque	12	G	5'8"	Sophomore	Houston, Texas	Transferred to Sam Houston State
Jala Buster	23	G/F	5'10"	Sophomore	Houston, Texas	Retired
Kennedi Center	25	F	6'0"	Senior	New Braunfels, Texas	Graduated

=== Recruiting ===
College recruiting information
Name	Hometown	School	Height	Weight	Commit date
Serin Dunne; Guard	Colorado Springs, CO	Mesa Ridge HS	5 ft 7 in (1.70 m)	N/A	Nov 15, 2019
Serin Dunne; Guard	Recruit ratings: No ratings found				
Janelle Jones; Guard	Pensacola, FL	Washington HS	5 ft 9 in (1.75 m)	N/A	Apr 30, 2019
Janelle Jones; Guard	Recruit ratings: No ratings found				
Overall recruit ranking:
Note: In many cases, Scout, Rivals, 247Sports, On3, and ESPN may conflict in their listings of height and weight.; In these cases, the average was taken. ESPN grades are on a 100-point scale.; Sources: "South Alabama 2020-21 Basketball Commits". ESPN.; "2020-21 Team Ranking". Rivals.com.

== Roster ==
2020–21 South Alabama Jaguars women's basketball team
Players
Coaches

Pos.	#	Name	Height	Year	Previous school	Hometown
G	2	Serin Dunne	5 ft 7 in (1.7 m)	Fr	Mesa Ridge HS	Colorado Springs, CO
G	3	Jayla Morrow	5 ft 8 in (1.73 m)	Sr	Wenonah HS	Birmingham, AL
G	4	Mahogany Vaught	5 ft 6 in (1.68 m)	Jr	Olive Branch HS	Olive Branch, MS
G	10	Janelle Jones	5 ft 9 in (1.75 m)	Fr	Booker T. Washington HS	Pensacola, FL
G	14	Savannah Jones	6 ft 0 in (1.83 m)	RS Sr	St. Martin HS	Ocean Springs, MS
F	21	Casey Ferguson	5 ft 11 in (1.8 m)	RS Jr	D'Iberville HS	Biloxi, MS
F	22	Jaylen Mallard	6 ft 2 in (1.88 m)	So	EStem Public Charter	Little Rock, AR
C	34	Ashanti Lavergne	6 ft 2 in (1.88 m)	RS Fr	Scotlandville Magnet HS	Baton Rouge, LA
F/C	35	Antoinette Lewis	6 ft 1 in (1.85 m)	Sr	Harding Academy	Memphis, TN
G	45	Devyn Lowe	5 ft 7 in (1.7 m)	RS Jr	Woodstock HS	Woodstock, GA

Head coach

- Terry Fowler (Lane College)

Assistant coach(es)

- Dan Presel (Spring Hill)
- Rachel Travis (Northwest)
- Mansa El (Houston)

Legend

- (C) Team captain
- (S) Suspended
- (I) Ineligible
- (W) Walk-on
- Injured
- Current redshirt

Roster
Last update: 10 December 2020

== Schedule and results ==
Date time, TV	Rank^{#}	Opponent^{#}	Result	Record	High points	High rebounds	High assists	Site city, state
Non-conference Regular Season
11/25/2020*; 12:00 p.m.		Mobile	W 70–40	1–0	13 – Lewis	13 – Jones	4 – Lewis	Mitchell Center (405); Mobile, AL
12/01/2020*; 12:00 p.m.		Tulane	L 73–77	1–1	22 – Lowe	12 – Lewis	4 – Lowe	Mitchell Center (263); Mobile, AL
12/05/2020*; 7:00 p.m.		Nicholls	W 74–66	2–1	23 – Lewis	8 – Lewis	6 – Lowe	Mitchell Center (309); Mobile, Al
12/08/2020*; 12:00 p.m.		William Carey	W 65–40	3–1	14 – Vaught	7 – Davis	4 – Morrow	Mitchell Center (271); Mobile, AL
12/13/2020*; 3:00 p.m.		at Auburn	L 66–74	3–2	15 – Lewis	15 – Lewis	6 – Vaught	Auburn Arena (520); Auburn, AL
12/20/2020*; 12:00 p.m.		at New Orleans	L 64–74	3–3	14 – Lowe	9 – Lewis	4 – Vaught	Lakefront Arena (278); New Orleans, LA
Conference Regular Season
01/01/2021; 1:00 p.m., ESPN+		Georgia Southern	W 71–65	4–3 (1–0)	22 – Lowe	8 – Mallard	5 – Vaught	Mitchell Center (270); Mobile, AL
01/02/2021; 2:00 p.m., ESPN+		Georgia Southern	L 71–78	4–4 (1–1)	18 – Lewis	7 – Lewis	4 – Vaught	Mitchell Center (316); Mobile, AL
01/08/2021; 5:00 p.m., ESPN+		Coastal Carolina	W 68–57	5–4 (2–1)	20 – Vaught	15 – Lewis	5 – Vaught	Mitchell Center (265); Mobile, AL
01/09/2021; 2:00 p.m., ESPN+		Coastal Carolina	W 55–52	6–4 (3–1)	13 – Lewis	8 – Lewis	5 – Vaught	Mitchell Center (288); Mobile, AL
01/15/2021; 5:00 p.m., ESPN+		at Appalachian State	W 66–63	7–4 (4–1)	18 – Jones	10 – Lewis	2 – Morrow	Holmes Center (55); Boone, NC
01/16/2021; 3:00 p.m., ESPN+		at Appalachian State	L 52–71	7–5 (4–2)	24 – Lowe	10 – Lewis	4 – Vaught	Holmes Center (50); Boone, NC
01/22/2021; 5:00 p.m., ESPN+		at Georgia Southern	W 59–58	8–5 (5–2)	16 – Vaught	10 – Jones	2 – Morrow	Hanner Fieldhouse (257); Statesboro, GA
01/23/2021; 3:00 p.m., ESPN+		at Georgia Southern	L 56–68	8–6 (5–3)	17 – Jones	9 – Lewis	3 – Lewis	Hanner Fieldhouse (203); Statesboro, GA
01/28/2021; 6:00 p.m., ESPN+		Georgia State	L 41–47	8–7 (5–4)	12 – Morrow	10 – Lewis	3 – Mallard	Mitchell Center (357); Mobile, AL
01/29/2021; 4:00 p.m., ESPN+		Georgia State	W 58–46	9–7 (6–4)	12 – Vaught	10 – Jones	4 – Jones	Mitchell Center (309); Mobile, AL
02/06/2021; 12:00 p.m., ESPN+		at Coastal Carolina	W 95–75	10–7 (7–4)	22 – Jones	9 – Lewis	6 – Vaught	HTC Center (73); Conway, SC
02/07/2021; 12:00 p.m., ESPN+		at Coastal Carolina	W 61–56	11–7 (8–4)	23 – Jones	10 – Jones	5 – Morrow	HTC Center (83); Conway, SC
02/11/2021; 6:00 p.m., ESPN+		at Troy	L 45–85	11–8 (8–5)	12 – Mallard	9 – Jones	4 – Jones	Trojan Arena (1,187); Troy, AL
02/13/2021; 4:00 p.m., ESPN+		Troy	L 77–84	11–9 (8–6)	21 – Jones	13 – Mallard	4 – Vaught	Mitchell Center (508); Mobile, AL
02/19/2021; 6:00 p.m., ESPN+		Appalachian State	W 56–51	12–9 (9–6)	23 – Lewis	8 – Vaught	5 – Vaught	Mitchell Center (334); Mobile, AL
02/20/2021; 4:00 p.m., ESPN+		Appalachian State	L 56–58	12–10 (9–7)	19 – Jones	11 – Lewis	4 – Vaught	Mitchell Center (343); Mobile, AL
02/26/2021; 5:00 p.m., ESPN+		at Georgia State	L 45–60	12–11 (9–8)	15 – Lewis	6 – Lewis	5 – Ferguson	GSU Sports Arena (449); Atlanta, GA
02/27/2021; 1:00 p.m., ESPN+		at Georgia State	L 64–76	12–12 (9–9)	19 – Lewis	10 – Lewis	7 – Vaught	GSU Sports Arena (525); Atlanta, GA
Sun Belt Tournament
03/05/2021; 2:00 pm, ESPN+	(E4)	vs. (W5) Arkansas State; First Round	W 73–64	13–12	16 – Morrow	19 – Lewis	6 – Lewis	Hartsell Arena (166); Pensacola, FL
03/06/2021; 1:30 pm, ESPN+	(E4)	vs. (W1) Louisiana; First Round	L 46–65	13–13	14 – Vaught	11 – Lewis	4 – Lewis	Pensacola Bay Center; Pensacola, FL
*Non-conference game. ^{#}Rankings from AP Poll. (#) Tournament seedings in parentheses. All times are in Central Time.

== See also ==
- 2020–21 South Alabama Jaguars men's basketball team
