= 2020–21 Southeastern Conference women's basketball season =

American collegiate basketball season

2020–21 SEC Women's Basketball Season
- League: NCAA Division I
- Sport: Basketball
- Teams: 14

WNBA Draft

Regular Season
- 2021 SEC Champions: Texas A&M
- Season MVP: Rhyne Howard

Tournament
- Champions: South Carolina
- Runners-up: Georgia
- Finals MVP: Aliyah Boston

Basketball seasons
- ← 2019–20 2021–22 →

2020–21 SEC women's basketball standings
	Conf.				Overall
Team	W		L	PCT	W		L	PCT
No. 4 Texas A&M	13	–	1	.929	25	–	3	.893
No. 6 South Carolina †	14	–	2	.875	26	–	5	.839
No. 13 Tennessee	9	–	4	.692	17	–	8	.680
No. 10 Georgia	10	–	5	.667	20	–	6	.769
No. 15 Arkansas	9	–	6	.600	19	–	8	.704
No. 18 Kentucky	9	–	6	.600	18	–	8	.692
Alabama	8	–	8	.500	16	–	9	.640
LSU	6	–	8	.429	9	–	13	.409
Mississippi State	5	–	7	.417	10	–	9	.526
Missouri	5	–	9	.357	9	–	13	.409
Ole Miss	4	–	10	.286	15	–	12	.556
Florida	3	–	11	.214	12	–	14	.462
Auburn	0	–	15	.000	5	–	19	.208
Vanderbilt^{%}	0	–	3	.000	4	–	4	.500
† 2021 SEC tournament winner % Vanderbilt suspended their season on January 18, 2021; As of March 21, 2021; Rankings from AP poll

The 2020–21 SEC women's basketball season began with practices in November 2020 and was followed by the start of the 2020–21 NCAA Division I women's basketball season in December. Conference play started in late December and will conclude in February, followed by the 2021 SEC women's basketball tournament at the Bon Secours Wellness Arena in Greenville, South Carolina, in March.

== Pre-season ==
=== Pre-season team predictions ===
	Coaches
1.	South Carolina
2.	Kentucky
3.	Texas A&M
4.	Arkansas
5.	Mississippi State
6.	Tennessee
7.	LSU
8.	Alabama
9.	Georgia
10.	Missouri
11.	Ole Miss
12.	Florida
13.	Vanderbilt
14.	Auburn

=== Pre-season All-SEC teams ===
Media	Coaches
**Rhyne Howard Kentucky**	**Howard**
Aliyah Boston South Carolina	Boston
	Chelsea Dungee Arkansas
	Unique Thompson Auburn
	Khayla Pointer LSU
	Rickea Jackson Mississippi State
	Rennia Davis Tennessee
	N'dea Jones Texas A&M

- Coaches select eight players
- Player in bold is choice for SEC Player of the Year

== Head coaches ==
Note: Stats shown are before the beginning of the season. Overall and SEC records are from time at current school.

Team	Head coach	Previous job	Seasons at school	Overall record	SEC record	NCAA Tournaments	NCAA Final Fours	NCAA Championships
Alabama	Kristy Curry	Texas Tech	8th	116–108	38–74	0	0	0
Arkansas	Mike Neighbors	Washington	4th	59–41	19–29	0	0	0
Auburn	Terri Williams-Flournoy	Georgetown	9th	135–119	48–80	3	0	0
Florida	Cameron Newbauer	Belmont	4th	34–57	12–36	0	0	0
Georgia	Joni Taylor	Georgia (asst.)	6th	97–57	44–35	2	0	0
Kentucky	Kyra Elzy	Kentucky (associate HC)	1st	0–0	0–0	0	0	0
LSU	Nikki Fargas	UCLA	10th	167–116	75–69	6	0	0
Mississippi State	Nikki McCray-Penson	Old Dominion	1st	0–0	0–0	0	0	0
Missouri	Robin Pingeton	Illinois State	11th	180–140	64–64	4	0	0
Ole Miss	Yolett McPhee-McCuin	Jacksonville	3rd	16–45	3–29	0	0	0
South Carolina	Dawn Staley	Temple	13th	305–98	138–52	8	2	1
Tennessee	Kellie Harper	Missouri State	2nd	21–10	10–6	0	0	0
Texas A&M	Gary Blair	Arkansas	18th	379–155	73–36	14	1	1
Vanderbilt	Stephanie White	Indiana Fever	5th	42–79	13–51	0	0	0

== Weekly rankings ==
Legend: ██ Increase in ranking. ██ Decrease in ranking. ██ Not ranked the previous week. RV=Received votes. NR=No rank/vote.
		Pre	Wk 2	Wk 3	Wk 4	Wk 5	Wk 6	Wk 7	Wk 8	Wk 9	Wk 10	Wk 11	Wk 12	Wk 13	Wk 14	Wk 15	Wk 16	Wk 17	Wk 18	Final
Alabama	AP					RV	RV	RV	RV	RV										
Alabama	C									RV	RV									
Arkansas	AP	14	16	13	12	11	10	13	17	15	19	16	18	18	16	13	15	15		
Arkansas	C	14	13	12	10	10	13	16	17	18	15	17	18	16	13	16	16			
Auburn	AP																			
Auburn	C																			
Florida	AP																			
Florida	C																			
Georgia	AP			RV	RV	RV	RV	RV	RV			25	24	22	17	16	12	10		
Georgia	C					RV	RV	RV	23	21	25	25	23	19	22	13	12			
Kentucky	AP	11	11	9	9	13	13	10	12	12	15	15	20	17	19	17	18	18		
Kentucky	C	12	9	9	12	11	8	11	12	14	14	18	17	17	19	19	19			
LSU	AP											RV								
LSU	C																			
Mississippi State	AP	6	6	12	13	12	12	14	14	19	21	24	RV	RV						
Mississippi State	C	7	12	13	13	13	15	14	19	19	22	24	RV	RV	RV					
Missouri	AP																			
Missouri	C		RV																	
Ole Miss	AP																			
Ole Miss	C																			
South Carolina	AP	1	1	5	5	5	5	5	5	4	4	2	1	2	5	7	5	6		
South Carolina	C	1	4	4	4	4	4	4	4	3	1	3	3	6	7	5	5			
Tennessee	AP	RV	RV			RV	RV	RV	23	25	20	18	16	21	20	14	14	13		
Tennessee	C	RV				RV	RV	24	RV	22	19	19	21	21	16	15	15			
Texas A&M	AP	13	12	10	10	9	9	8	7	8	8	7	6	5	3	2	4	4		
Texas A&M	C	13	10	10	9	9	7	7	8	7	7	5	5	3	2	4	4			
Vanderbilt	AP																			
Vanderbilt	C																			

== Conference matrix ==
	Alabama	Arkansas	Auburn	Florida	Georgia	Kentucky	LSU	Miss. State	Missouri	Ole Miss	S. Carolina	Tennessee	Texas A&M	Vanderbilt
vs. Alabama	–	0–0	0–0	0–0	0–0	0–0	59–67	78–86	59–74	0–0	77–60	82–56	0–0	56–80
vs. Arkansas	0–0	–	0–0	80–84	0–0	75–64	0–0	0–0	88–91	0–0	0–0	88–73	74–73	0–0
vs. Auburn	0–0	0–0	–	68–54	76–44	0–0	56–43	0–0	0–0	62–58	0–0	0–0	0–0	0–0
vs. Florida	0–0	84–80	54–68	–	68–58	0–0	0–0	68–56	0–0	0–0	75–59	0–0	92–67	0–0
vs. Georgia	0–0	0–0	44–76	58–68	–	0–0	0–0	69–62	0–0	57–73	0–0	66–67	0–0	0–0
vs. Kentucky	0–0	64–75	0–0	0–0	0–0	–	0–0	86–92^{OT}	0–0	0–0	75–70	0–0	77–60	73–80
vs. LSU	67–59	0–0	43–56	0–0	0–0	0–0	–	0–0	0–0	69–77^{OT}	0–0	64–63	61–65	0–0
vs. Miss. State	86–78	0–0	0–0	56–68	62–69	92–86^{OT}	0–0	–	0–0	56–60	0–0	0–0	69–41	0–0
vs. Missouri	74–59	91–88	0–0	0–0	0–0	0–0	0–0	0–0	–	77–86	0–0	0–0	0–0	0–0
vs. Ole Miss	0–0	0–0	58–62	0–0	73–57	0–0	77–69^{OT}	60–56	86–77	–	0–0	0–0	0–0	0–0
vs. South Carolina	60–77	0–0	0–0	59–75	0–0	70–75	0–0	0–0	0–0	0–0	–	0–0	0–0	43–106
vs. Tennessee	56–82	73–88	0–0	0–0	67–66	0–0	63–64	0–0	0–0	0–0	0–0	–	0–0	0–0
vs. Texas A&M	0–0	73–74	0–0	67–92	0–0	60–77	65–61	41–69	0–0	0–0	0–0	0–0	–	0–0
vs. Vanderbilt	80–56	0–0	0–0	0–0	0–0	80–73	0–0	0–0	0–0	0–0	106–43	0–0	0–0	–
Total	4–2	2–3	0–4	1–5	4–1	3–2	3–2	3–3	1–2	1–4	4–0	3–1	4–1	0–3

== Postseason ==
=== SEC tournament ===
- March 3–7 at the Bon Secours Wellness Arena in Greenville, South Carolina. Teams are seeded by conference record, with ties broken by record between the tied teams followed by record against the regular-season champion. Vanderbilt canceled its season after three conference games and, therefore, will not participate in the tournament.

**2021 SEC women's basketball tournament seeds and results**
Seed	School	Conf.	Over.	Tiebreaker	First Round March 3	Second Round March 4	Quarterfinals March 5	Semifinals March 6	Championship March 7
1	‡†**Texas A&M**	13–1	23–2		Bye	Bye	vs. #8 LSU; **W, 77–58**	vs. #4 Georgia; **L, 68–74**	
2	†**South Carolina**	14–2	22–4		Bye	Bye	vs. #7 Alabama; **W, 75–63**	vs. # 3 Tennessee; **W, 67–52**	vs. #4 Georgia; **W, 67–62**
3	†**Tennessee**	9–4	16–7		Bye	Bye	vs. #11 Ole Miss; **W, 77–72**	vs. #2 South Carolina; **L, 52–67**	
4	†**Georgia**	10–5	20–6		Bye	Bye	vs. #5 Kentucky; **W, 78–66**	vs. #1 Texas A&M; **W, 74–68**	vs. #2 South Carolina; **L, 62–67**
5	#**Kentucky**	9–6	17–8	1–0 vs. ARK	Bye	vs. #12 Florida; **W, 73–64**	vs. #4 Georgia; **L, 66–78**		
6	#**Arkansas**	9–6	19–8	0–1 vs. UK	Bye	vs. #11 Ole Miss; **L, 60–69**			
7	#**Alabama**	8–8	16–9		Bye	vs. #10 Missouri; **W, 82–74**	vs. #2 South Carolina; **L, 63–75**		
8	#**LSU**	6–8	9–13		Bye	vs. #9 Mississippi State; **W, 71–62**	vs. #1 Texas A&M; **L, 58–77**		
9	#**Mississippi State**	5–7	10–9		Bye	vs. #8 LSU; **L, 62–71**			
10	#**Missouri**	5–9	9–11		Bye	vs. #7 Alabama; **L, 75–82**			
11	#**Ole Miss**	4–10	11–11		Bye	vs. #6 Arkansas; **W, 69–60**	vs. #3 Tennessee; **L, 72–77**		
12	**Florida**	3–11	11–13		vs. #13 Auburn; **W, 69–62**	vs. #5 Kentucky; **L, 64–73**			
13	**Auburn**	0–15	5–19		vs. #12 Florida; **L, 62–69**				
‡ – SEC regular season champions, and tournament No. 1 seed. † – Received a double-bye in the conference tournament. # – Received a single-bye in the conference tournament. Overall records include all games played in the tournament.

=== NCAA Division I Women's Basketball tournament ===
- March 21–April 4

Seed	Bracket	School	First Round	Second Round	Sweet 16	Elite 8	Final Four
1	HemisFair	South Carolina	vs. #16 Mercer; **W, 79–53**	vs. #8 Oregon State; **W, 59–42**	vs. #5 Georgia Tech; **W, 76–65**	vs. #6 Texas; **W, 62–34**	vs. #1 Stanford; **L, 65–66**
2	Mercado	Texas A&M	vs. #15 Troy; **W, 84–80**	vs. #7 Iowa State; **W, 84–82^{OT}**	vs. #3 Arizona; **L, 59–79**		
3	Alamo	Georgia	vs. #14 Drexel; **W, 60–53**	vs. #6 Oregon; **L, 50–57**			
3	River Walk	Tennessee	vs. #14 Middle Tennessee; **W, 87–62**	vs. #6 Michigan; **L, 55–70**			
4	River Walk	Kentucky	vs. #13 Idaho State; **W, 71–63**	vs. #5 Iowa; **L, 72–86**			
7	HemisFair	Alabama	vs. #10 North Carolina; **W, 80–71**	vs. #2 Maryland; **L, 64–100**			
**# Bids: 6**	W-L (%):	TOTAL: 10–6 (.625)	6–0 (1.000)	2–4 (.333)	1–1 (.500)	1–0 (1.000)	0–1 (.000)

=== Women's National Invitation tournament ===
- March 19–28

School	First Round March 19	Second Round March 20	Quarterfinals March 22	Semifinals March 26	Championship March 28
Missouri	vs. Fresno State; **L, 75–78**				
Ole Miss	vs. Samford; **W, 64–45**	vs. Tulane; **W, 72–61**	vs. Colorado; **W, 65–56**	vs. Northern Iowa; **W, 60–50**	vs. Rice; **L, 58–71**
Florida	vs. Charlotte; **W, 66–65**	vs. Villanova; **L, 57–77**			

==== Consolation games ====
School	First Game March 20
Missouri	vs. Arizona State; **L, 39–50**
