= 2020–21 Charlotte 49ers women's basketball team =

American college basketball season

2020–21 Charlotte 49ers women's basketball
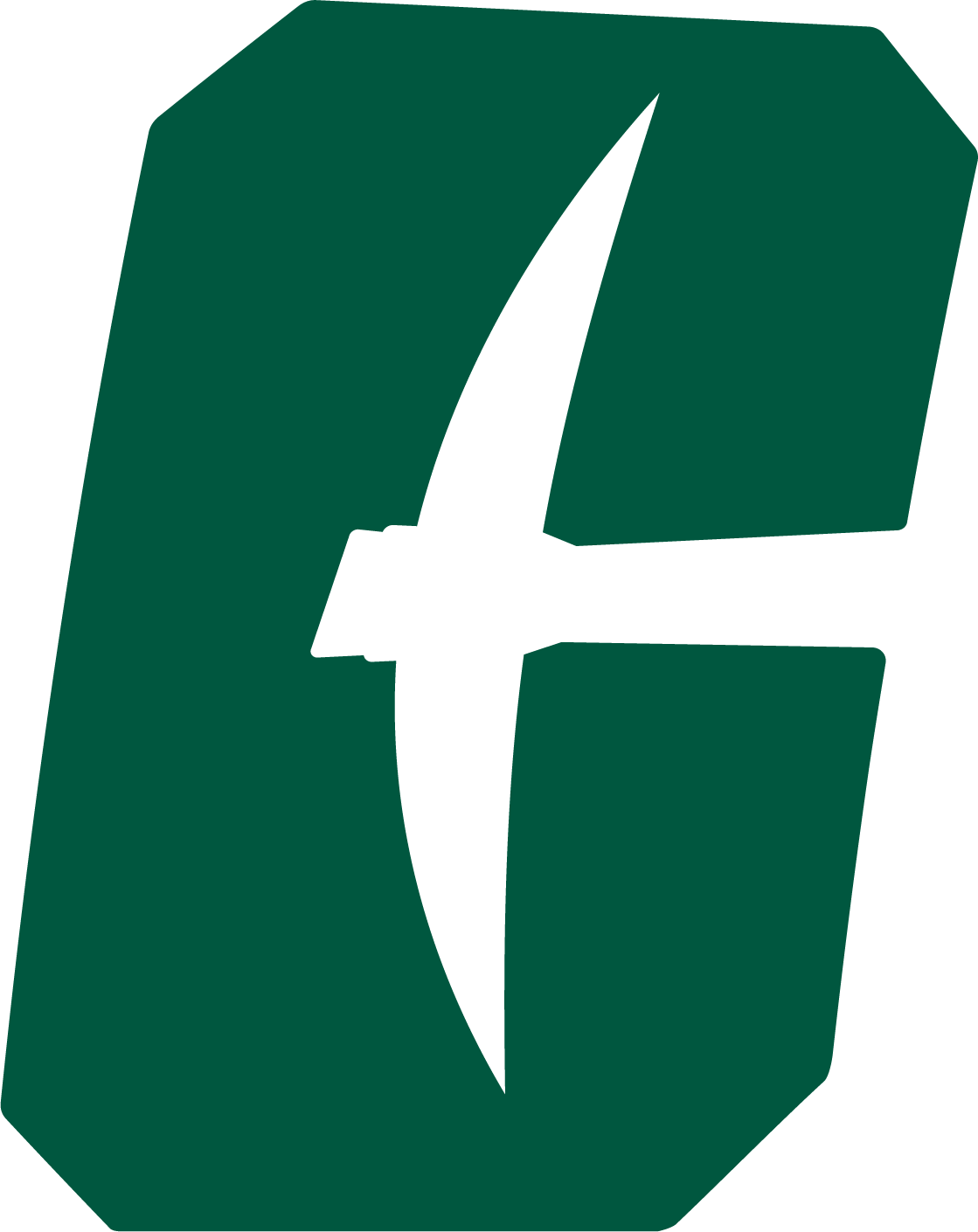

WNIT, First Round
- Conference: Conference USA
- East Division
- Record: 10–12 (9–5 CUSA)
- Head coach: Cara Consuegra (10th season)
- Assistant coaches: Nicole Woods; Tanisha Wright; Cait Wetmore-Banx
- Home arena: Dale F. Halton Arena

2020–21 Conference USA women's basketball standings
	Conf.				Overall
Team	W		L	PCT	W		L	PCT
East
Middle Tennessee †	12	–	4	.750	17	–	8	.680
Charlotte	9	–	5	.643	10	–	12	.455
FIU	8	–	8	.500	15	–	13	.536
Florida Atlantic	8	–	8	.500	11	–	11	.500
Old Dominion	7	–	9	.438	13	–	11	.542
Marshall	7	–	9	.438	8	–	11	.421
Western Kentucky	6	–	10	.375	7	–	16	.304
West
Rice	12	–	2	.857	23	–	4	.852
UTEP	13	–	5	.722	17	–	8	.680
North Texas	10	–	4	.714	13	–	7	.650
Louisiana Tech	8	–	8	.500	14	–	10	.583
Southern Miss	5	–	11	.313	7	–	12	.368
UAB	3	–	11	.214	10	–	13	.435
UTSA	0	–	14	.000	2	–	18	.100
† 2021 C-USA tournament winner As of March 13, 2021; Rankings from AP poll

The 2020–21 Charlotte 49ers women's basketball team represented University of North Carolina at Charlotte during the 2020–21 NCAA Division I women's basketball season. The team was led by tenth-year head coach Cara Consuegra, and played their home games at the Dale F. Halton Arena in Charlotte, North Carolina as a member of Conference USA.

== Schedule and results ==
Date time, TV	Rank^{#}	Opponent^{#}	Result	Record	Site (attendance) city, state
Non-conference regular season
November 25, 2020*; 2:00 p.m.		at Appalachian State	L 68–74	0–1	Holmes Center; Boone, NC
November 30, 2020*; 2:00 p.m.		Clemson	L 73–80	0–2	Dale F. Halton Arena (17); Charlotte, NC
December 3, 2020*; 6:00 p.m.		Wake Forest	L 75–78	0–3	Dale F. Halton Arena (52); Charlotte, NC
December 6, 2020*; 4:00 p.m.		at North Carolina	L 75–81	0–4	Carmichael Arena; Chapel Hill, NC
December 10, 2020*; 4:00 p.m.		Dayton	Canceled (Note: Game was canceled due to COVID-19 pandemic related issues.)		Dale F. Halton Arena; Charlotte, NC
December 11, 2020*; 3:00 p.m.		at Campbell	W 62–42	1–4	John W. Pope Jr. Convocation Center; Buies Creek, NC
December 15, 2020*; 6:00 p.m.		Davidson	Canceled		Dale F. Halton Arena; Charlotte, NC
CUSA regular season
January 1, 2021; 7:00 p.m.		at Western Kentucky	Postponed (Note: Game was postponed due to COVID-19 pandemic related issues.)		E. A. Diddle Arena; Bowling Green, KY
January 2, 2021; 5:00 p.m.		at Western Kentucky	Postponed		E. A. Diddle Arena; Bowling Green, KY
January 8, 2021; 6:00 p.m.		Marshall	W 75–54	2–4 (1–0)	Dale F. Halton Arena (48); Charlotte, NC
January 9, 2021; 3:00 p.m.		Marshall	W 65–56 ^{OT}	3–4 (2–0)	Dale F. Halton Arena (58); Charlotte, NC
January 15, 2021; 3:00 p.m.		at UAB	W 78–74	4–4 (3–0)	Bartow Arena (214); Birmingham, AL
January 16, 2021; 3:00 p.m.		at UAB	W 72–64	5–4 (4–0)	Bartow Arena (264); Birmingham, AL
January 22, 2021; 3:00 p.m.		Florida Atlantic	Postponed		Dale F. Halton Arena; Charlotte, NC
January 23, 2021; 3:00 p.m.		Florida Atlantic	Postponed		Dale F. Halton Arena; Charlotte, NC
January 29, 2021; 5:00 p.m.		at Western Kentucky	L 99–100 ^{3OT}	5–5 (4–1)	E. A. Diddle Arena (507); Bowling Green, KY
January 29, 2021; 7:00 p.m.		at FIU	Canceled		Ocean Bank Convocation Center; Miami, FL
January 30, 2021; 4:00 p.m.		at FIU	Canceled		Ocean Bank Convocation Center; Miami, FL
January 30, 2021; 5:00 p.m.		at Western Kentucky	L 64–65	5–6 (4–2)	E. A. Diddle Arena (576); Bowling Green, KY
February 5, 2021; 3:00 p.m.		Middle Tennessee	L 70–77	5–7 (4–3)	Dale F. Halton Arena; Charlotte, NC
February 6, 2021; 2:00 p.m.		Middle Tennessee	W 82–72	6–7 (5–3)	Dale F. Halton Arena; Charlotte, NC
February 10, 2021; 6:30 p.m.		at Old Dominion	W 102–95 ^{2OT}	7–7 (6–3)	Chartway Arena (250); Norfolk, VA
February 13, 2021; 6:00 p.m.		Old Dominion	W 87–80 ^{OT}	8–7 (7–3)	Dale F. Halton Arena; Charlotte, NC
February 20, 2021; 1:00 p.m.		at UTSA	Canceled (Note: Game was canceled due to weather concerns.)		Convocation Center; San Antonio, TX
February 21, 2021; 1:00 p.m.		at UTSA	Canceled		Convocation Center; San Antonio, TX
February 26, 2021; 3:00 p.m.		UTEP	W 62–53	9–7 (8–3)	Dale F. Halton Arena (34); Charlotte, NC
February 27, 2021; 3:00 p.m.		UTEP	L 68–71	9–8 (8–4)	Dale F. Halton Arena (202); Charlotte, NC
March 5, 2021; 3:00 p.m.		Florida Atlantic	L 73–77	9–9 (8–5)	Dale F. Halton Arena (149); Charlotte, NC
March 6, 2021; 3:00 p.m.		Florida Atlantic	W 83–73	10–9 (9–5)	Dale F. Halton Arena (247); Charlotte, NC
CUSA Tournament
March 11, 2021; 12:30 p.m.	(2E)	vs. (6E) Old Dominion; Quarterfinals	L 89–90	10–10	Ford Center at The Star; Frisco, TX
WNIT
March 19, 2021; 5:00 p.m.		vs. Florida; First Round – Charlotte Regional	L 65–66	10–11	Bojangles Coliseum; Charlotte, NC
March 20, 2021; 2:00 p.m.		vs. UMass; Consolation round – Charlotte Regional	L 75–81	10–12	Bojangles Coliseum; Charlotte, NC
*Non-conference game. ^{#}Rankings from AP Poll. (#) Tournament seedings in parentheses. All times are in Central.

== See also ==
- 2020–21 Charlotte 49ers men's basketball team
