= 2020–21 Southern Miss Lady Eagles basketball team =

American college basketball season

2020–21 Southern Miss Lady Eagles basketball
- Conference: Conference USA
- West Division
- Record: 7–12 (5–11 C-USA)
- Head coach: Joye Lee-McNelis (17th season)
- Assistant coaches: Jack Trosper; Patosha Jeffery; Stephanie Stoglin-Reed
- Home arena: Reed Green Coliseum

2020–21 Conference USA women's basketball standings
	Conf.				Overall
Team	W		L	PCT	W		L	PCT
East
Middle Tennessee †	12	–	4	.750	17	–	8	.680
Charlotte	9	–	5	.643	10	–	12	.455
FIU	8	–	8	.500	15	–	13	.536
Florida Atlantic	8	–	8	.500	11	–	11	.500
Old Dominion	7	–	9	.438	13	–	11	.542
Marshall	7	–	9	.438	8	–	11	.421
Western Kentucky	6	–	10	.375	7	–	16	.304
West
Rice	12	–	2	.857	23	–	4	.852
UTEP	13	–	5	.722	17	–	8	.680
North Texas	10	–	4	.714	13	–	7	.650
Louisiana Tech	8	–	8	.500	14	–	10	.583
Southern Miss	5	–	11	.313	7	–	12	.368
UAB	3	–	11	.214	10	–	13	.435
UTSA	0	–	14	.000	2	–	18	.100
† 2021 C-USA tournament winner As of March 13, 2021; Rankings from AP poll

The 2020–21 Southern Miss Lady Eagles basketball team represented the University of Southern Mississippi during the 2020–21 NCAA Division I women's basketball season. The team was led by seventeenth-year head coach Joye Lee-McNelis, and played their home games at the Reed Green Coliseum in Hattiesburg, Mississippi as a member of Conference USA.

== Schedule and results ==
Date time, TV	Rank^{#}	Opponent^{#}	Result	Record	Site (attendance) city, state
Non-conference regular season
November 27, 2020*; 3:00 p.m.		Alabama A&M; Lady Eagle Thanksgiving Classic	Canceled (Note: Game was canceled due to COVID-19-related issues.)		Reed Green Coliseum; Hattiesburg, MS
November 28, 2020*; 5:00 p.m.		Southeastern Louisiana; Lady Eagle Thanksgiving Classic	Canceled		Reed Green Coliseum; Hattiesburg, MS
December 5, 2020*; 4:00 p.m.		McNeese State	Canceled		Reed Green Coliseum; Hattiesburg, MS
December 12, 2020*; 2:00 p.m.		No. 12 Mississippi State	Canceled		Reed Green Coliseum; Hattiesburg, MS
December 17, 2020*; 8:00 p.m.		at Alabama	Canceled		Coleman Coliseum; Tuscaloosa, AL
December 18, 2020*; 6:00 p.m.		Nicholls	W 63–50	1–0	Reed Green Coliseum; Hattiesburg, MS
December 19, 2020*; 6:00 p.m.		William Carey	W 57–50	2–0	Reed Green Coliseum; Hattiesburg, MS
C-USA regular season
January 1, 2021; 2:00 p.m.		at UTEP	L 65–83	2–1 (0–1)	Don Haskins Center; El Paso, TX
January 2, 2021; 1:00 p.m.		at UTEP	L 72–74	2–2 (0–2)	Don Haskins Center; El Paso, TX
January 8, 2021; 6:00 p.m.		UAB	L 63–85	2–3 (0–3)	Reed Green Coliseum (1,200); Hattiesburg, MS
January 9, 2021; 4:00 p.m.		UAB	L 65–84	2–4 (0–4)	Reed Green Coliseum (1,200); Hattiesburg, MS
January 15, 2021; 6:00 p.m.		at Middle Tennessee	L 58–78	2–5 (0–5)	Murphy Center (100); Murfreesboro, TN
January 16, 2021; 4:00 p.m.		at Middle Tennessee	W 69–61	3–5 (1–5)	Murphy Center (100); Murfreesboro, TN
January 22, 2021; 6:00 p.m.		UTSA	W 88–64	4–5 (2–5)	Reed Green Coliseum (1,200); Hattiesburg, MS
January 23, 2021; 4:00 p.m.		UTSA	W 73–66	5–5 (3–5)	Reed Green Coliseum (1,200); Hattiesburg, MS
January 28, 2021; 6:30 p.m.		at Louisiana Tech	L 60–77	5–6 (3–6)	Thomas Assembly Center (1,200); Ruston, LA
January 30, 2021; 4:00 p.m.		Louisiana Tech	W 57–44	6–6 (4–6)	Reed Green Coliseum (1,200); Hattiesburg, MS
February 5, 2021; 6:00 p.m.		Rice	Postponed (Note: Game was postponed due to COVID-19-related issues.)		Reed Green Coliseum; Hattiesburg, MS
February 6, 2021; 4:00 p.m.		Rice	Postponed		Reed Green Coliseum; Hattiesburg, MS
February 12, 2021; 6:30 p.m.		at North Texas	L 55–76	6–7 (4–7)	UNT Coliseum (865); Denton, TX
February 13, 2021; 3:30 p.m.		at North Texas	L 64–72	6–8 (4–8)	UNT Coliseum (843); Denton, TX
February 19, 2021; 6:00 p.m.		FIU	L 58–59 ^{OT}	6–9 (4–9)	Reed Green Coliseum (1,200); Hattiesburg, MS
February 20, 2021; 4:00 p.m.		FIU	W 76–60	7–9 (5–9)	Reed Green Coliseum (1,200); Hattiesburg, MS
February 26, 2021; 4:00 p.m.		at Florida Atlantic	L 63–78	7–10 (5–10)	FAU Arena (228); Boca Raton, FL
February 27, 2021; 1:00 p.m.		at Florida Atlantic	L 61–86	7–11 (5–11)	FAU Arena (239); Boca Raton, FL
C-USA tournament
March 10, 2021; 11:00 a.m.	(5W)	vs. (4E) FIU; Second round	L 75–85	7–12	Ford Center at The Star; Frisco, TX
*Non-conference game. ^{#}Rankings from AP poll. (#) Tournament seedings in parentheses. All times are in Central.

== See also ==
- 2020–21 Southern Miss Golden Eagles basketball team
