= 2020–21 Western Kentucky Lady Toppers basketball team =

American college basketball season

2020–21 Western Kentucky Lady Toppers basketball
- Conference: Conference USA
- East Division
- Record: 7–16 (6–10 C-USA)
- Head coach: Greg Collins (3rd season)
- Assistant coaches: Jocelyn (Wyatt) Brown; Tiffany Porter-Talbert; Jhasmin Bowen
- Home arena: E. A. Diddle Arena

2020–21 Conference USA women's basketball standings
	Conf.				Overall
Team	W		L	PCT	W		L	PCT
East
Middle Tennessee †	12	–	4	.750	17	–	8	.680
Charlotte	9	–	5	.643	10	–	12	.455
FIU	8	–	8	.500	15	–	13	.536
Florida Atlantic	8	–	8	.500	11	–	11	.500
Old Dominion	7	–	9	.438	13	–	11	.542
Marshall	7	–	9	.438	8	–	11	.421
Western Kentucky	6	–	10	.375	7	–	16	.304
West
Rice	12	–	2	.857	23	–	4	.852
UTEP	13	–	5	.722	17	–	8	.680
North Texas	10	–	4	.714	13	–	7	.650
Louisiana Tech	8	–	8	.500	14	–	10	.583
Southern Miss	5	–	11	.313	7	–	12	.368
UAB	3	–	11	.214	10	–	13	.435
UTSA	0	–	14	.000	2	–	18	.100
† 2021 C-USA tournament winner As of March 13, 2021; Rankings from AP poll

The 2020–21 Western Kentucky Lady Toppers basketball team represented Western Kentucky University during the 2020–21 NCAA Division I women's basketball season. The team was led by third-year head coach Greg Collins, and played their home games at the E. A. Diddle Arena in Bowling Green, Kentucky as a member of Conference USA (C-USA).

== Schedule and results ==
Date time, TV	Rank^{#}	Opponent^{#}	Result	Record	Site (attendance) city, state
Non-conference regular season
November 28, 2020*; 1:00 p.m.		at Tennessee	L 47–87	0–1	Thompson–Boling Arena (2,239); Knoxville, TN
December 5, 2020*; 2:00 p.m.		Ball State	L 54–58	0–2	E. A. Diddle Arena (537); Bowling Green, KY
December 13, 2020*; 2:30 p.m.		at Little Rock	L 47–63	0–3	Jack Stephens Center (305); Little Rock, AR
December 16, 2020*; 6:00 p.m.		Bellarmine	W 82–49	1–3	E. A. Diddle Arena (552); Bowling Green, KY
December 18, 2020*; 6:00 p.m.		Mercer	L 54–71	1–4	E. A. Diddle Arena (529); Bowling Green, KY
December 20, 2020*; 2:00 p.m.		at Tennessee Tech	L 59–73	1–5	Eblen Center (453); Cookeville, TN
December 21, 2020*; 6:00 p.m.		Samford	Canceled (Note: Game canceled due to COVID-19 pandemic-related issues)		E. A. Diddle Arena; Bowling Green, KY
C-USA regular season
January 1, 2021; 6:00 p.m.		Charlotte	Postponed (Note: Game postponed due to COVID-19 pandemic-related issues)		E. A. Diddle Arena; Bowling Green, KY
January 2, 2021; 4:00 p.m.		Charlotte	Postponed		E. A. Diddle Arena; Bowling Green, KY
January 8, 2021; 6:30 p.m.		at Louisiana Tech	W 61–55	2–5 (1–0)	Thomas Assembly Center (1,200); Ruston, LA
January 9, 2021; 4:00 p.m.		at Louisiana Tech	L 52–58	2–6 (1–1)	Thomas Assembly Center (1,200); Ruston, LA
January 14, 2021; 5:00 p.m.		at Marshall	L 54–81	2–7 (1–2)	Cam Henderson Center (391); Huntington, WV
January 17, 2021; 2:00 p.m.		Marshall	W 69–60	3–7 (2–2)	E. A. Diddle Arena (517); Bowling Green, KY
January 22, 2021; 6:00 p.m.		Middle Tennessee	L 65–75	3–8 (2–3)	E. A. Diddle Arena (527); Bowling Green, KY
January 23, 2021; 6:00 p.m.		Middle Tennessee	L 60–77	3–9 (2–4)	E. A. Diddle Arena (601); Bowling Green, KY
January 28, 2021; 5:30 p.m.		at Old Dominion	Postponed		Chartway Arena; Norfolk, VA
January 29, 2021; 4:00 p.m.		Charlotte	W 100–99 ^{3OT}	4–9 (3–4)	E. A. Diddle Arena (507); Bowling Green, KY
January 30, 2021; 3:00 p.m.		at Old Dominion	Postponed		Chartway Arena; Norfolk, VA
January 30, 2021; 4:00 p.m.		Charlotte	W 65–64	5–9 (4–4)	E. A. Diddle Arena (576); Bowling Green, KY
February 5, 2021; 6:00 p.m.		Florida Atlantic	W 71–64	6–9 (5–4)	E. A. Diddle Arena (513); Bowling Green, KY
February 6, 2021; 6:00 p.m.		Florida Atlantic	L 70–75	6–10 (5–5)	E. A. Diddle Arena (582); Bowling Green, KY
February 12, 2021; 2:00 p.m.		at Rice	L 55–64	6–11 (5–6)	Tudor Fieldhouse; Houston, TX
February 13, 2021; 4:00 p.m.		at Rice	L 74–77	6–12 (5–7)	Tudor Fieldhouse; Houston, TX
February 20, 2021; 2:00 p.m.		North Texas	Postponed (Note: Game canceled due to weather concerns)		E. A. Diddle Arena; Bowling Green, KY
February 21, 2021; 5:00 p.m.		North Texas	Postponed		E. A. Diddle Arena; Bowling Green, KY
February 26, 2021; 6:00 p.m.		at FIU	W 66–56	7–12 (6–7)	Ocean Bank Convocation Center (202); Miami, FL
February 27, 2021; 3:00 p.m.		at FIU	L 79–82	7–13 (6–8)	Ocean Bank Convocation Center; Miami, FL
March 4, 2021; 5:30 p.m.		at Old Dominion	L 53–55	7–14 (6–9)	Chartway Arena (250); Norfolk, VA
March 5, 2021; 5:30 p.m.		at Old Dominion	L 55–57	7–15 (6–10)	Chartway Arena (250); Norfolk, VA
C-USA tournament
March 9, 2021; 4:00 p.m.	(7E)	vs. (6E) Old Dominion; First round	L 77–83 ^{OT}	7–16	Ford Center at The Star; Frisco, TX
*Non-conference game. ^{#}Rankings from AP poll. (#) Tournament seedings in parentheses. All times are in Central.

== See also ==
- 2020–21 Western Kentucky Hilltoppers basketball team
