= 2020–21 FIU Panthers women's basketball team =

American college basketball season

2020–21 FIU Panthers women's basketball

WBI, 5th place
- Conference: Conference USA
- East Division
- Record: 15–13 (8–8 CUSA)
- Head coach: Jesyka Burks-Wiley (1st season)
- Assistant coaches: Robyn Scherr-Wells; Dan Wendt; Tim Sylver
- Home arena: Ocean Bank Convocation Center

2020–21 Conference USA women's basketball standings
	Conf.				Overall
Team	W		L	PCT	W		L	PCT
East
Middle Tennessee †	12	–	4	.750	17	–	8	.680
Charlotte	9	–	5	.643	10	–	12	.455
FIU	8	–	8	.500	15	–	13	.536
Florida Atlantic	8	–	8	.500	11	–	11	.500
Old Dominion	7	–	9	.438	13	–	11	.542
Marshall	7	–	9	.438	8	–	11	.421
Western Kentucky	6	–	10	.375	7	–	16	.304
West
Rice	12	–	2	.857	23	–	4	.852
UTEP	13	–	5	.722	17	–	8	.680
North Texas	10	–	4	.714	13	–	7	.650
Louisiana Tech	8	–	8	.500	14	–	10	.583
Southern Miss	5	–	11	.313	7	–	12	.368
UAB	3	–	11	.214	10	–	13	.435
UTSA	0	–	14	.000	2	–	18	.100
† 2021 C-USA tournament winner As of March 13, 2021; Rankings from AP poll

The 2020–21 FIU Panthers women's basketball team represented Florida International University during the 2020–21 NCAA Division I women's basketball season. The team was led by first-year head coach Robyn Scherr-Wells, and played their home games at the Ocean Bank Convocation Center in Miami, FL as a member of Conference USA (C-USA). They finished the season 15–13, 8–8 in C-USA play, to finish in a tie for third place in the East division of the conference.

== Schedule and results ==
Date time, TV	Rank^{#}	Opponent^{#}	Result	Record	Site (attendance) city, state
Regular season
November 29, 2020*; 2:00 p.m.		Stetson	Postponed (Note: Game postponed due to COVID-19 pandemic related issues)		Ocean Bank Convocation Center; Miami, FL
December 3, 2020*; 7:00 p.m.		at North Florida	L 66–84	0–1	UNF Arena (227); Jacksonville, FL
December 5, 2020*; 2:00 p.m.		at Jacksonville	W 64–59	1–1	Swisher Gymnasium (107); Jacksonville, FL
December 14, 2020*; 7:00 p.m.		Florida Memorial	W 96–57	2–1	Ocean Bank Convocation Center; Miami, FL
December 16, 2020*; 7:00 p.m.		Flagler	W 97–64	3–1	Ocean Bank Convocation Center (15); Miami, FL
December 20, 2020*; 12:00 p.m.		Florida Gulf Coast	L 68–86	3–2	Ocean Bank Convocation Center (57); Miami, FL
December 21, 2020*; 12:00 p.m.		Florida Gulf Coast	L 66–80	3–3	Ocean Bank Convocation Center (48); Miami, FL
January 1, 2021; 2:00 p.m.		at Old Dominion	W 92–85	4–3 (1–0)	Chartway Arena (250); Norfolk, VA
January 2, 2021; 2:00 p.m.		at Old Dominion	W 81–80	5–3 (2–0)	Chartway Arena (250); Norfolk, VA
January 8, 2021; 7:00 p.m.		Middle Tennessee	L 65–69	5–4 (2–1)	Ocean Bank Convocation Center (115); Miami, FL
January 9, 2021; 2:00 p.m.		Middle Tennessee	L 89–99	5–5 (2–2)	Ocean Bank Convocation Center (101); Miami, FL
January 15, 2021; 5:00 p.m.		at Florida Atlantic	L 69–73	5–6 (2–3)	FAU Arena (253); Boca Raton, FL
January 16, 2021; 4:00 p.m.		Florida Atlantic	W 65–62	6–6 (3–3)	Ocean Bank Convocation Center (105); Miami, FL
January 22, 2021; 6:00 p.m.		at Marshall	W 75–60	7–6 (4–3)	Cam Henderson Center (407); Huntington, WV
January 23, 2021; 3:00 p.m.		at Marshall	L 56–65	7–7 (4–4)	Cam Henderson Center (404); Huntington, WV
January 29, 2021; 7:00 p.m.		Charlotte	Canceled (Note: Game canceled due to COVID-19 pandemic related issues)		Ocean Bank Convocation Center; Miami, FL
January 30, 2021; 4:00 p.m.		Charlotte	Canceled		Ocean Bank Convocation Center; Miami, FL
February 5, 2021; 7:00 p.m.		at UTSA	W 72–60	8–7 (5–4)	Convocation Center (137); San Antonio, TX
February 6, 2021; 5:00 p.m.		at UTSA	W 107–103 ^{3OT}	9–7 (6–4)	Convocation Center (179); San Antonio, TX
February 12, 2021; 7:00 p.m.		UTEP	L 64–76	9–8 (6–5)	Ocean Bank Convocation Center (71); Miami, FL
February 13, 2021; 2:00 p.m.		UTEP	L 57–73	9–9 (6–6)	Ocean Bank Convocation Center; Miami, FL
February 19, 2021; 7:00 p.m.		at Southern Miss	W 59–58 ^{OT}	10–9 (7–6)	Reed Green Coliseum (1,200); Hattiesburg, MS
February 20, 2021; 5:00 p.m.		at Southern Miss	L 60–76	10–10 (7–7)	Reed Green Coliseum (1,200); Hattiesburg, MS
February 26, 2021; 7:00 p.m.		Western Kentucky	L 56–66	10–11 (7–8)	Ocean Bank Convocation Center (202); Miami, FL
February 27, 2021; 4:00 p.m.		Western Kentucky	W 82–79	11–11 (8–8)	Ocean Bank Convocation Center; Miami, FL
March 3, 2021*; 7:00 p.m.		Florida Memorial	W 101–74	12–11	Ocean Bank Convocation Center; Miami, FL
CUSA tournament
March 10, 2021; 12:00 p.m.	(4E)	vs. (5W) Southern Miss; Second round	W 85–75	13–11	Ford Center at The Star; Frisco, TX
March 11, 2021; 12:00 p.m.	(4E)	vs. (1W) Rice; Quarterfinals	L 60–77	13–12	Ford Center at The Star; Frisco, TX
WBI
March 19, 2021; 7:30 p.m.		vs. Northern Arizona; Quarterfinals	L 69–82	13–13	William Exum Center; Frankfort, KY
March 20, 2021; 5:00 p.m.		vs. Abilene Christian; Consolation 2nd round	W 78–61	14–13	William Exum Center; Frankfort, KY
March 21, 2021; 2:30 p.m.		vs. Manhattan; 5th-place game	W 59–58	14–13	William Exum Center; Frankfort, KY
*Non-conference game. ^{#}Rankings from AP poll. (#) Tournament seedings in parentheses. All times are in Eastern.

== See also ==
- 2020–21 FIU Panthers men's basketball team
