= 2020–21 Old Dominion Monarchs women's basketball team =

American college basketball season

2020–21 Old Dominion Monarchs women's basketball
- Conference: Conference USA
- East Division
- Record: 13–11 (7–9 C-USA)
- Head coach: DeLisha Milton-Jones (1st season)
- Assistant coaches: Brandy Manning; Roneeka Hodges
- Home arena: Chartway Arena

2020–21 Conference USA women's basketball standings
	Conf.				Overall
Team	W		L	PCT	W		L	PCT
East
Middle Tennessee †	12	–	4	.750	17	–	8	.680
Charlotte	9	–	5	.643	10	–	12	.455
FIU	8	–	8	.500	15	–	13	.536
Florida Atlantic	8	–	8	.500	11	–	11	.500
Old Dominion	7	–	9	.438	13	–	11	.542
Marshall	7	–	9	.438	8	–	11	.421
Western Kentucky	6	–	10	.375	7	–	16	.304
West
Rice	12	–	2	.857	23	–	4	.852
UTEP	13	–	5	.722	17	–	8	.680
North Texas	10	–	4	.714	13	–	7	.650
Louisiana Tech	8	–	8	.500	14	–	10	.583
Southern Miss	5	–	11	.313	7	–	12	.368
UAB	3	–	11	.214	10	–	13	.435
UTSA	0	–	14	.000	2	–	18	.100
† 2021 C-USA tournament winner As of March 13, 2021; Rankings from AP poll

The 2020–21 Old Dominion Monarchs women's basketball team represented Old Dominion University during the 2020–21 NCAA Division I women's basketball season. The team was led by first-year head coach DeLisha Milton-Jones, and played their home games at the Chartway Arena in Norfolk, Virginia, as a member of Conference USA.

== Schedule and results ==
The Monarchs finished the season at 13–11, with a 7–9 record in conference play.

Date time, TV	Rank^{#}	Opponent^{#}	Result	Record	Site (attendance) city, state
Non-conference regular season
November 28, 2020*; 2:00 p.m.		at George Washington	L 37–55	0–1	Charles E. Smith Center; Washington, D.C.
December 3, 2020*; 6:30 p.m.		William & Mary; Rivalry	W 70–47	1–1	Chartway Arena (250); Norfolk, VA
December 6, 2020*; 2:00 p.m.		VCU	W 81–76 ^{OT}	2–1	Chartway Arena (250); Norfolk, VA
December 11, 2020*; 6:30 p.m.		North Dakota	Canceled (Note: Game was canceled due to COVID-19 pandemic related issues.)		Chartway Arena; Norfolk, VA
December 13, 2020*; 2:00 p.m.		USC Upstate	W 73–39	3–1	Chartway Arena (250); Norfolk, VA
December 20, 2020*; 2:00 p.m.		at Drexel	Postponed (Note: Game was postponed due to COVID-19 pandemic related issues.)		Daskalakis Athletic Center; Philadelphia, PA
December 29, 2020*; 1:00 p.m.		at Delaware State	Canceled		Memorial Hall; Dover, DE
C-USA regular season
January 1, 2021; 2:00 p.m.		FIU	L 85–92	3–2 (0–1)	Chartway Arena (250); Norfolk, VA
January 2, 2021; 2:00 p.m.		at FIU	L 80–81	3–3 (0–2)	Chartway Arena (250); Norfolk, VA
January 8, 2021; 5:00 p.m.		Florida Atlantic	W 71–56	4–3 (1–2)	FAU Arena (177); Boca Raton, FL
January 9, 2021; 2:00 p.m.		Florida Atlantic	W 77–72	5–3 (2–2)	FAU Arena (180); Boca Raton, FL
January 15, 2021; 6:30 p.m.		Rice	L 66–77	5–4 (2–3)	Chartway Arena (250); Norfolk, VA
January 16, 2021; 4:00 p.m.		Rice	L 59–67	5–5 (2–4)	Chartway Arena (250); Norfolk, VA
January 22, 2021; 6:00 p.m.		at North Texas	Postponed		UNT Coliseum; Denton, TX
January 23, 2021; 3:00 p.m.		at North Texas	Postponed		UNT Coliseum; Denton, TX
January 29, 2021; 6:30 p.m.		Western Kentucky	Postponed		Chartway Arena; Norfolk, VA
January 30, 2021; 4:00 p.m.		Western Kentucky	Postponed		Chartway Arena; Norfolk, VA
February 5, 2021; 6:00 p.m.		at Marshall	W 80–70	6–5 (3–4)	Cam Henderson Center (381); Huntington, WV
February 6, 2021; 3:00 p.m.		at Marshall	L 68–73 ^{OT}	6–6 (3–5)	Cam Henderson Center (410); Huntington, WV
February 10, 2021; 6:30 p.m.		Charlotte	L 95–102 ^{2OT}	6–7 (3–6)	Chartway Arena (250); Norfolk, VA
February 13, 2021; 6:00 p.m.		at Charlotte	L 80–87 ^{OT}	6–8 (3–7)	Dale F. Halton Arena; Charlotte, NC
February 19, 2021; 6:30 p.m.		UAB	L 61–74	6–9 (3–8)	Chartway Arena (250); Norfolk, VA
February 20, 2021; 4:00 p.m.		UAB	W 70–47	7–9 (4–8)	Chartway Arena (250); Norfolk, VA
February 26, 2021; 7:00 p.m.		at Middle Tennessee	W 74–57	8–9 (5–8)	Murphy Center (1,159); Murfreesboro, TN
February 27, 2021; 5:00 p.m.		at Middle Tennessee	L 70–74	8–10 (5–9)	Murphy Center (1,150); Murfreesboro, TN
March 4, 2021; 6:30 p.m.		Western Kentucky	W 55–53	9–10 (6–9)	Chartway Arena (250); Norfolk, VA
March 5, 2021; 6:30 p.m.		at Western Kentucky	W 57–55	10–10 (7–9)	Chartway Arena (250); Norfolk, VA
C-USA Tournament
March 9, 2021; 5:00 p.m.	(6E)	vs. (7E) Western Kentucky; First Round	W 83–77 ^{OT}	11–10	Ford Center at The Star; Frisco, TX
March 10, 2021; 12:30 p.m.	(6E)	vs. (3W) North Texas; Second Round	W 71–66	12–10	Ford Center at The Star; Frisco, TX
March 11, 2021; 12:30 p.m.	(6E)	vs. (2E) Charlotte; Quarterfinals	W 90–89 ^{2OT}	13–10	Ford Center at The Star; Frisco, TX
March 12, 2021; 6:30 p.m.	(6E)	vs. (1W) Rice; Semifinals	L 60–62	13–11	Ford Center at The Star; Frisco, TX
*Non-conference game. ^{#}Rankings from AP Poll. (#) Tournament seedings in parentheses. All times are in Central.

- Source: Old Dominion Athletics

== See also ==
- 2020–21 Old Dominion Monarchs men's basketball team
