= 2020–21 UAB Blazers women's basketball team =

American college basketball season

2020–21 UAB Blazers women's basketball
- Conference: Conference USA
- West Division
- Record: 10–13 (3–11 CUSA)
- Head coach: Randy Norton (8th season)
- Associate head coach: Taren Martin
- Assistant coaches: Reagan Miller; Dodie Dunson II
- Home arena: Bartow Arena

2020–21 Conference USA women's basketball standings
	Conf.				Overall
Team	W		L	PCT	W		L	PCT
East
Middle Tennessee †	12	–	4	.750	17	–	8	.680
Charlotte	9	–	5	.643	10	–	12	.455
FIU	8	–	8	.500	15	–	13	.536
Florida Atlantic	8	–	8	.500	11	–	11	.500
Old Dominion	7	–	9	.438	13	–	11	.542
Marshall	7	–	9	.438	8	–	11	.421
Western Kentucky	6	–	10	.375	7	–	16	.304
West
Rice	12	–	2	.857	23	–	4	.852
UTEP	13	–	5	.722	17	–	8	.680
North Texas	10	–	4	.714	13	–	7	.650
Louisiana Tech	8	–	8	.500	14	–	10	.583
Southern Miss	5	–	11	.313	7	–	12	.368
UAB	3	–	11	.214	10	–	13	.435
UTSA	0	–	14	.000	2	–	18	.100
† 2021 C-USA tournament winner As of March 13, 2021; Rankings from AP poll

The 2020–21 UAB Blazers women's basketball team represented the University of Alabama at Birmingham during the 2020–21 NCAA Division I women's basketball season. The team was led by eighth-year head coach Randy Norton, and played their home games at the Bartow Arena in Birmingham, Alabama as a member of Conference USA.

== Schedule and results ==
Date time, TV	Rank^{#}	Opponent^{#}	Result	Record	Site (attendance) city, state
Regular season
November 25, 2020*; 10:30 a.m.		Edward Waters	W 80–57	0–1	Bartow Arena (297); Birmingham, AL
November 29, 2020*; 2:00 p.m.		Tennessee Tech	Canceled (Note: Game was canceled due to COVID-19 pandemic related issues.)		Bartow Arena; Birmingham, AL
December 6, 2020*; 1:00 p.m.		at Chattanooga	W 78–58	2–0	McKenzie Arena; Chattanooga, TN
December 10, 2020*; 6:00 p.m.		Mercer	L 68–71	2–1	Bartow Arena (202); Birmingham, AL
December 13, 2020*; 2:00 p.m.		Grambling State	W 70–62	3–1	Bartow Arena (292); Birmingham, AL
December 18, 2020*; 10:00 a.m.		at Stetson; Stetson Tournament	W 49–48	4–1	Edmunds Center; DeLand, FL
December 19, 2020*; 12:00 p.m.		vs. Abilene Christian; Stetson Tournament	W 81–73	5–1	Edmunds Center; DeLand, FL
December 22, 2020*; 12:00 p.m.		Tennessee State	Canceled		Bartow Arena; Birmingham, AL
January 1, 2021; 2:00 p.m.		North Texas	L 70–74	5–2 (0–1)	Bartow Arena; Birmingham, AL
January 2, 2021; 2:00 p.m.		North Texas	L 70–79	5–3 (0–2)	Bartow Arena (241); Birmingham, AL
January 8, 2021; 6:00 p.m.		at Southern Miss	W 85–63	6–3 (1–2)	Reed Green Coliseum (1,200); Hattiesburg, MS
January 9, 2021; 4:00 p.m.		at Southern Miss	W 84–65	7–3 (2–2)	Reed Green Coliseum (1,200); Hattiesburg, MS
January 15, 2021; 2:00 p.m.		Charlotte	L 74–78	7–4 (2–3)	Bartow Arena (214); Birmingham, AL
January 16, 2021; 2:00 p.m.		Charlotte	L 64–72	7–5 (2–4)	Bartow Arena (264); Birmingham, AL
January 22, 2021; 2:00 p.m.		at Rice	Postponed (Note: Game was postponed due to COVID-19 pandemic related issues.)		Tudor Fieldhouse; Houston, TX
January 23, 2021; 2:00 p.m.		at Rice	Postponed		Tudor Fieldhouse; Houston, TX
January 28, 2021; 6:00 p.m.		Middle Tennessee	L 78–81 ^{OT}	7–6 (2–5)	Bartow Arena (305); Birmingham, AL
January 30, 2021; 4:00 p.m.		at Middle Tennessee	L 68–95	7–7 (2–6)	Murphy Center (100); Murfreesboro, TN
February 5, 2021; 8:00 p.m.		at UTEP	L 53–74	7–8 (2–7)	Don Haskins Center (292); El Paso, TX
February 6, 2021; 5:00 p.m.		at UTEP	L 64–68	7–9 (2–8)	Don Haskins Center (263); El Paso, TX
February 12, 2021; 2:00 p.m.		Louisiana Tech	L 51–75	7–10 (2–9)	Bartow Arena (222); Birmingham, AL
February 13, 2021; 2:00 p.m.		Louisiana Tech	L 61–83	7–11 (2–10)	Bartow Arena (280); Birmingham, AL
February 19, 2021; 5:30 p.m.		at Old Dominion	W 74–61	8–11 (3–10)	Chartway Arena (250); Norfolk, VA
February 20, 2021; 3:00 p.m.		at Old Dominion	L 47–70	8–12 (3–11)	Chartway Arena (250); Norfolk, VA
February 26, 2021; 2:00 p.m.		UTSA	Canceled		Bartow Arena; Birmingham, AL
February 27, 2021; 2:00 p.m.		UTSA	Canceled		Bartow Arena; Birmingham, AL
March 5, 2021*; 2:00 p.m.		Fort Valley State	W 78–45	9–12	Bartow Arena (209); Birmingham, AL
CUSA Tournament
March 9, 2021; 4:30 p.m.	(6W)	vs. (7W) UTSA; First Round	W 80–66	10–12	Ford Center at The Star; Frisco, TX
March 10, 2021; 2:30 p.m.	(6W)	vs. (3E) Florida Atlantic; Second Round	L 66–72	10–13	Ford Center at The Star (623); Frisco, TX
*Non-conference game. ^{#}Rankings from AP Poll. (#) Tournament seedings in parentheses. All times are in Central.

== See also ==
- 2020–21 UAB Blazers men's basketball team
