= 2020–21 UTSA Roadrunners women's basketball team =

American college basketball season

2020–21 UTSA Roadrunners women's basketball
- Conference: Conference USA
- West Division
- Record: 2-18 (0-14 CUSA)
- Head coach: Kristen Holt (4th season)
- Assistant coaches: Adam Esses; Ela Mukosiej; Monique Whaley-Briggs
- Home arena: Convocation Center

2020–21 Conference USA women's basketball standings
	Conf.				Overall
Team	W		L	PCT	W		L	PCT
East
Middle Tennessee †	12	–	4	.750	17	–	8	.680
Charlotte	9	–	5	.643	10	–	12	.455
FIU	8	–	8	.500	15	–	13	.536
Florida Atlantic	8	–	8	.500	11	–	11	.500
Old Dominion	7	–	9	.438	13	–	11	.542
Marshall	7	–	9	.438	8	–	11	.421
Western Kentucky	6	–	10	.375	7	–	16	.304
West
Rice	12	–	2	.857	23	–	4	.852
UTEP	13	–	5	.722	17	–	8	.680
North Texas	10	–	4	.714	13	–	7	.650
Louisiana Tech	8	–	8	.500	14	–	10	.583
Southern Miss	5	–	11	.313	7	–	12	.368
UAB	3	–	11	.214	10	–	13	.435
UTSA	0	–	14	.000	2	–	18	.100
† 2021 C-USA tournament winner As of March 13, 2021; Rankings from AP poll

The 2020–21 UTSA Roadrunners women's basketball team represented the University of Texas at San Antonio during the 2020–21 NCAA Division I women's basketball season. The team was led by fourth-year head coach Kristen Holt, and played their home games at the Convocation Center in San Antonio, Texas as a member of Conference USA.

== Schedule and results ==
Date time, TV	Rank^{#}	Opponent^{#}	Result	Record	Site (attendance) city, state
Non-conference regular season
November 25, 2020*; 2:00 p.m.		Sul Ross	W 80–37	1–0	Convocation Center (103); San Antonio, TX
November 30, 2020*; 7:00 p.m.		UTRGV	L 50–60	1–1	Convocation Center (228); San Antonio, TX
December 3, 2020*; 7:00 p.m.		at Incarnate Word	L 63–69	1–2	McDermott Center (189); San Antonio, TX
December 13, 2020*; 2:00 p.m.		Incarnate Word	Canceled (Note: Game was canceled due to COVID-19 pandemic related issues.)		Convocation Center; San Antonio, TX
December 15, 2020*; 7:00 p.m.		Northwestern State	W 73–55	2–2	Convocation Center (201); San Antonio, TX
December 18, 2020*; 6:30 p.m.		at Sam Houston State	L 47–71	2–3	Bernard Johnson Coliseum (480); Huntsville, TX
CUSA regular season
January 1, 2021; 2:00 p.m.		Rice	L 53–78	2–4 (0–1)	Convocation Center (157); San Antonio, TX
January 2, 2021; 1:00 p.m.		Rice	L 57–69	2–5 (0–2)	Convocation Center (165); San Antonio, TX
January 8, 2021; 6:30 p.m.		at North Texas	L 78–85	2–6 (0–3)	UNT Coliseum (812); Denton, TX
January 9, 2021; 3:30 p.m.		at North Texas	L 52–76	2–7 (0–4)	UNT Coliseum (864); Denton, TX
January 15, 2021; 6:00 p.m.		Louisiana Tech	L 51–69	2–8 (0–5)	Convocation Center (122); San Antonio, TX
January 16, 2021; 4:00 p.m.		Louisiana Tech	L 48–74	2–9 (0–6)	Convocation Center (153); San Antonio, TX
January 22, 2021; 6:00 p.m.		at Southern Miss	L 64–88	2–10 (0–7)	Reed Green Coliseum (1,200); Hattiesburg, MS
January 23, 2021; 4:00 p.m.		at Southern Miss	L 66–73	2–11 (0–8)	Reed Green Coliseum (1,200); Hattiesburg, MS
January 28, 2021; 8:00 p.m.		at UTEP	L 56–82	2–12 (0–9)	Don Haskins Center (246); El Paso, TX
January 30, 2021; 1:00 p.m.		UTEP	L 51–67	2–13 (0–10)	Convocation Center (164); San Antonio, TX
February 5, 2021; 6:00 p.m.		FIU	L 60–72	2–14 (0–11)	Convocation Center (137); San Antonio, TX
February 6, 2021; 4:00 p.m.		FIU	L 103–107 ^{3OT}	2–15 (0–12)	Convocation Center (179); San Antonio, TX
February 12, 2021; 4:00 p.m.		at Florida Atlantic	L 59–72	2–16 (0–13)	FAU Arena (182); Boca Raton, FL
February 13, 2021; 1:00 p.m.		at Florida Atlantic	L 50–79	2–17 (0–14)	FAU Arena (205); Boca Raton, FL
February 20, 2021; 12:00 p.m.		Charlotte	Canceled (Note: Game was canceled due to weather concerns.)		Convocation Center; San Antonio, TX
February 21, 2021; 12:00 p.m.		Charlotte	Canceled		Convocation Center; San Antonio, TX
February 26, 2021; 6:00 p.m.		at UAB	Postponed (Note: Game was postponed due to COVID-19 pandemic related issues.)		Bartow Arena; Birmingham, AL
February 27, 2021; 3:00 p.m.		at UAB	Postponed		Bartow Arena; Birmingham, AL
CUSA Tournament
March 9, 2021; 4:30 p.m.	(7W)	vs. (6W) UAB; First Round	L 66–80	2–18	Ford Center at The Star; Frisco, TX
*Non-conference game. ^{#}Rankings from AP Poll. (#) Tournament seedings in parentheses. All times are in Central.

== See also ==
- 2020–21 UTSA Roadrunners men's basketball team
