= 2020–21 North Texas Mean Green women's basketball team =

American college basketball season

2020–21 North Texas Mean Green women's basketball
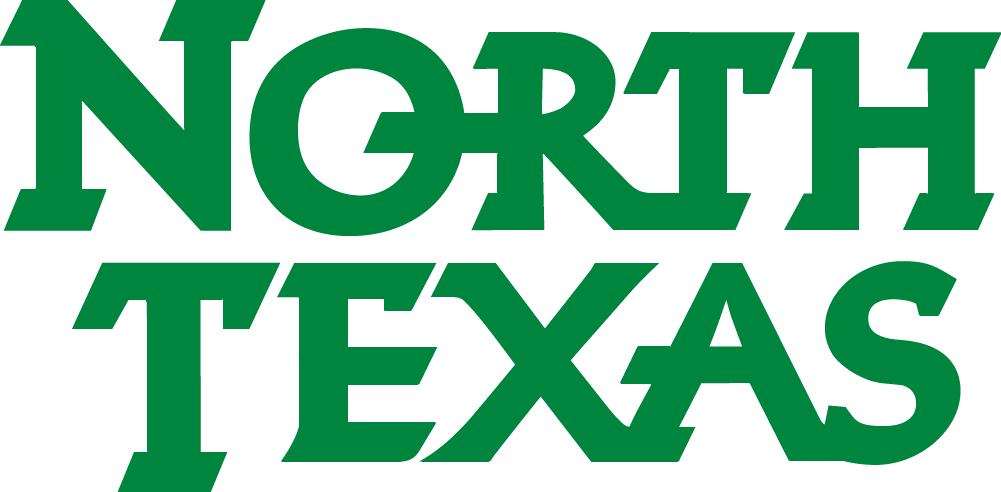
- Conference: Conference USA
- West Division
- Record: 13-7 (10-4 CUSA)
- Head coach: Jalie Mitchell (6th season)
- Associate head coach: Jamie Carey
- Assistant coaches: Durmon Jennings; Kelby Jones
- Home arena: UNT Coliseum

2020–21 Conference USA women's basketball standings
	Conf.				Overall
Team	W		L	PCT	W		L	PCT
East
Middle Tennessee †	12	–	4	.750	17	–	8	.680
Charlotte	9	–	5	.643	10	–	12	.455
FIU	8	–	8	.500	15	–	13	.536
Florida Atlantic	8	–	8	.500	11	–	11	.500
Old Dominion	7	–	9	.438	13	–	11	.542
Marshall	7	–	9	.438	8	–	11	.421
Western Kentucky	6	–	10	.375	7	–	16	.304
West
Rice	12	–	2	.857	23	–	4	.852
UTEP	13	–	5	.722	17	–	8	.680
North Texas	10	–	4	.714	13	–	7	.650
Louisiana Tech	8	–	8	.500	14	–	10	.583
Southern Miss	5	–	11	.313	7	–	12	.368
UAB	3	–	11	.214	10	–	13	.435
UTSA	0	–	14	.000	2	–	18	.100
† 2021 C-USA tournament winner As of March 13, 2021; Rankings from AP poll

The 2020–21 North Texas Mean Green women's basketball team represented the University of North Texas during the 2020–21 NCAA Division I women's basketball season. The team was led by sixth-year head coach Jalie Mitchell, and played their home games at the UNT Coliseum in Denton, Texas as a member of Conference USA.

== Schedule and results ==
Date time, TV	Rank^{#}	Opponent^{#}	Result	Record	Site (attendance) city, state
Non-conference regular season
November 25, 2020*; 7:00 p.m.		Tarleton State	W 87–71	1–0	UNT Coliseum (1,038); Denton, TX
November 29, 2020*; 2:00 p.m.		at Texas	L 69–106	1–1	Frank Erwin Center (995); Austin, TX
December 4, 2020*; 6:00 p.m.		at Louisiana	W 83–74	2–1	Cajundome (141); Lafayette, LA
December 19, 2020*; 1:00 p.m.		vs. Prairie View A&M; South Padre Island Classic	Canceled (Note: During game against UT Arlington on December 18, 2020, it was determine that the court at the South Padre Island Convention Centre was unsafe, the game was postponed to the following day, which resulted the Prairie View A&M game to be canceled. The UT Arlington game was moved to the UTRGV Fieldhouse to finish the game.)		South Padre Island Convention Centre; South Padre Island, TX
December 18, 2020*; 4:00 p.m. December 19, 2020*; 3:00 p.m.		vs. UT Arlington; South Padre Island Classic	W 74–56	3–1	South Padre Island Convention Centre; South Padre Island, TX; UTRGV Fieldhouse; Edinburg, TX
December 22, 2020*; 5:00 p.m.		Oklahoma State	L 68–82	3–2	UNT Coliseum (961); Denton, TX
CUSA regular season
January 1, 2021; 2:00 p.m.		at UAB	W 74–70	4–2 (1–0)	Bartow Arena; Birmingham, AL
January 2, 2021; 2:00 p.m.		at UAB	W 79–70	5–2 (2–0)	Bartow Arena (241); Birmingham, AL
January 8, 2021; 6:30 p.m.		UTSA	W 85–78	6–2 (3–0)	UNT Coliseum (812); Denton, TX
January 9, 2021; 3:30 p.m.		UTSA	W 76–52	7–2 (4–0)	UNT Coliseum (864); Denton, TX
January 15, 2021; 8:00 p.m.		at UTEP	W 67–59	8–2 (5–0)	Don Haskins Center (282); El Paso, TX
January 16, 2021; 5:00 p.m.		at UTEP	L 52–62	8–3 (5–1)	Don Haskins Center (261); El Paso, TX
January 22, 2021; 5:00 p.m.		Old Dominion	Postponed (Note: Game was postponed due to COVID-19 pandemic related issues.)		UNT Coliseum; Denton, TX
January 23, 2021; 2:00 p.m.		Old Dominion	Postponed		UNT Coliseum; Denton, TX
January 28, 2021; 6:30 p.m.		Rice	Postponed		UNT Coliseum; Denton, TX
January 30, 2021; 2:00 p.m.		at Rice	Postponed		Tudor Fieldhouse; Houston, TX
February 5, 2021; 6:30 p.m.		at Louisiana Tech	L 55–60	8–4 (5–2)	Thomas Assembly Center (1,200); Ruston, LA
February 6, 2021; 4:00 p.m.		at Louisiana Tech	W 63–58	9–4 (6–2)	Thomas Assembly Center (1,200); Ruston, LA
February 12, 2021; 6:30 p.m.		Southern Miss	W 76–55	10–4 (7–2)	UNT Coliseum (865); Denton, TX
February 13, 2021; 3:30 p.m.		Southern Miss	W 72–64	11–4 (8–2)	UNT Coliseum (843); Denton, TX
February 20, 2021; 4:00 p.m.		at Western Kentucky	Postponed (Note: Game was postponed due to weather concerns.)		E. A. Diddle Arena; Bowling Green, KY
February 21, 2021; 5:00 p.m.		at Western Kentucky	Postponed		E. A. Diddle Arena; Bowling Green, KY
February 26, 2021; 6:30 p.m.		Marshall	W 52–51	12–4 (9–2)	UNT Coliseum (787); Denton, TX
February 27, 2021; 3:30 p.m.		Marshall	L 55–56	12–5 (9–3)	UNT Coliseum (843); Denton, TX
March 4, 2021; 7:00 p.m.		Rice	L 58–64	12–6 (9–4)	UNT Coliseum (839); Denton, TX
March 6, 2021; 4:00 p.m.		at Rice	W 75–66	13–6 (10–4)	Tudor Fieldhouse; Houston, TX
CUSA Tournament
March 10, 2021; 11:30 a.m.	(3W)	vs. (6E) Old Dominion; Second Round	L 66–71	13–7	Ford Center at The Star; Frisco, TX
*Non-conference game. ^{#}Rankings from AP Poll. (#) Tournament seedings in parentheses. All times are in Central.

== See also ==
- 2020–21 North Texas Mean Green men's basketball team
