= 2020–21 Marshall Thundering Herd women's basketball team =

American college basketball season

2020–21 Marshall Thundering Herd women's basketball
- Conference: Conference USA
- East Division
- Record: 8–11 (7–9 CUSA)
- Head coach: Tony Kemper (4th season)
- Assistant coaches: Adria Crawford; Lazar Milinkovic
- Home arena: Cam Henderson Center

2020–21 Conference USA women's basketball standings
	Conf.				Overall
Team	W		L	PCT	W		L	PCT
East
Middle Tennessee †	12	–	4	.750	17	–	8	.680
Charlotte	9	–	5	.643	10	–	12	.455
FIU	8	–	8	.500	15	–	13	.536
Florida Atlantic	8	–	8	.500	11	–	11	.500
Old Dominion	7	–	9	.438	13	–	11	.542
Marshall	7	–	9	.438	8	–	11	.421
Western Kentucky	6	–	10	.375	7	–	16	.304
West
Rice	12	–	2	.857	23	–	4	.852
UTEP	13	–	5	.722	17	–	8	.680
North Texas	10	–	4	.714	13	–	7	.650
Louisiana Tech	8	–	8	.500	14	–	10	.583
Southern Miss	5	–	11	.313	7	–	12	.368
UAB	3	–	11	.214	10	–	13	.435
UTSA	0	–	14	.000	2	–	18	.100
† 2021 C-USA tournament winner As of March 13, 2021; Rankings from AP poll

The 2020–21 Marshall Thundering Herd women's basketball team represented Marshall University during the 2020–21 NCAA Division I women's basketball season. The team was led by fourth-year head coach Tony Kemper, and played their home games at the Cam Henderson Center in Huntington, West Virginia as a member of Conference USA.

== Schedule and results ==
Date time, TV	Rank^{#}	Opponent^{#}	Result	Record	Site (attendance) city, state
Non-conference regular season
December 1, 2020*; 6:00 p.m.		Morgan State	Canceled (Note: Game was canceled due to COVID-19 pandemic related issues.)		Cam Henderson Center; Huntington, WV
December 6, 2020*; 1:00 p.m.		Radford	W 69–58	1–0	Cam Henderson Center (412); Huntington, WV
December 9, 2020*; 7:00 p.m.		at No. 9 Kentucky	L 45–79	1–1	Memorial Coliseum (1,200); Lexington, KY
December 13, 2020*; 1:00 p.m.		at St. Bonaventure	Canceled		Reilly Center; St. Bonaventure, NY
December 17, 2020*; 1:00 p.m.		Morehead State	Canceled		Cam Henderson Center; Huntington, WV
CUSA regular season
January 1, 2021; 6:00 p.m.		Louisiana Tech	L 51–61 ^{OT}	1–2 (0–1)	Cam Henderson Center (381); Huntington, WV
January 2, 2021; 3:00 p.m.		Louisiana Tech	W 61–57	2–2 (1–1)	Cam Henderson Center (366); Huntington, WV
January 8, 2021; 6:00 p.m.		at Charlotte	L 54–75	2–3 (1–2)	Dale F. Halton Arena (48); Charlotte, NC
January 9, 2021; 3:00 p.m.		at Charlotte	L 56–65 ^{OT}	2–4 (1–3)	Dale F. Halton Arena (58); Charlotte, NC
January 14, 2021; 6:00 p.m.		Western Kentucky	W 81–54	3–4 (2–3)	Cam Henderson Center (391); Huntington, WV
January 17, 2021; 3:00 p.m.		at Western Kentucky	L 60–69	3–5 (2–4)	E. A. Diddle Arena (517); Bowling Green, KY
January 22, 2021; 6:00 p.m.		FIU	L 60–75	3–6 (2–5)	Cam Henderson Center (407); Huntington, WV
January 23, 2021; 3:00 p.m.		FIU	W 65–56	4–6 (3–5)	Cam Henderson Center (404); Huntington, WV
January 29, 2021; 5:00 p.m.		at Florida Atlantic	Postponed (Note: Game was postponed due to COVID-19 pandemic related issues.)		FAU Arena; Boca Raton, FL
January 30, 2021; 2:00 p.m.		at Florida Atlantic	Postponed		FAU Arena; Boca Raton, FL
February 5, 2021; 6:00 p.m.		Old Dominion	L 70–80	4–7 (3–6)	Cam Henderson Center (381); Huntington, WV
February 6, 2021; 3:00 p.m.		Old Dominion	W 73–68 ^{OT}	5–7 (4–6)	Cam Henderson Center (410); Huntington, WV
February 12, 2021; 7:00 p.m.		at Middle Tennessee	Postponed		Murphy Center; Murfreesboro, TN
February 13, 2021; 5:00 p.m.		at Middle Tennessee	Postponed		Murphy Center; Murfreesboro, TN
February 20, 2021; 1:00 p.m.		Rice	L 48–64	5–8 (4–7)	Cam Henderson Center (434); Huntington, WV
February 21, 2021; 12:00 p.m.		Rice	W 68–56	6–8 (5–7)	Cam Henderson Center (455); Huntington, WV
February 26, 2021; 7:30 p.m.		at North Texas	L 51–52	6–9 (5–8)	UNT Coliseum (787); Denton, TX
February 27, 2021; 4:30 p.m.		at North Texas	W 56–55	7–9 (6–8)	UNT Coliseum (843); Denton, TX
March 4, 2021; 7:00 p.m.		at Middle Tennessee	W 72–49	8–9 (7–8)	Murphy Center (1,150); Murfreesboro, TN
March 5, 2021; 7:00 p.m.		at Middle Tennessee	L 54–61	8–10 (7–9)	Murphy Center (1,150); Murfreesboro, TN
CUSA Tournament
March 10, 2021; 3:00 p.m.	(5E)	vs. (4W) Louisiana Tech; Second Round	L 48–50	8–11	Ford Center at The Star (623); Frisco, TX
*Non-conference game. ^{#}Rankings from AP Poll. (#) Tournament seedings in parentheses. All times are in Central.

== See also ==
- 2020–21 Marshall Thundering Herd men's basketball team
