= 2020–21 Florida Atlantic Owls women's basketball team =

American college basketball season

2020–21 Florida Atlantic Owls women's basketball
- Conference: Conference USA
- East Division
- Record: 11–11 (8–8 C-USA)
- Head coach: Jim Jabir (5th season)
- Associate head coach: Terry Primm
- Assistant coaches: Otávio Battaglia; Arianne Stinson
- Home arena: FAU Arena

2020–21 Conference USA women's basketball standings
	Conf.				Overall
Team	W		L	PCT	W		L	PCT
East
Middle Tennessee †	12	–	4	.750	17	–	8	.680
Charlotte	9	–	5	.643	10	–	12	.455
FIU	8	–	8	.500	15	–	13	.536
Florida Atlantic	8	–	8	.500	11	–	11	.500
Old Dominion	7	–	9	.438	13	–	11	.542
Marshall	7	–	9	.438	8	–	11	.421
Western Kentucky	6	–	10	.375	7	–	16	.304
West
Rice	12	–	2	.857	23	–	4	.852
UTEP	13	–	5	.722	17	–	8	.680
North Texas	10	–	4	.714	13	–	7	.650
Louisiana Tech	8	–	8	.500	14	–	10	.583
Southern Miss	5	–	11	.313	7	–	12	.368
UAB	3	–	11	.214	10	–	13	.435
UTSA	0	–	14	.000	2	–	18	.100
† 2021 C-USA tournament winner As of March 13, 2021; Rankings from AP poll

The 2020–21 Florida Atlantic Owls women's basketball team represented Florida Atlantic University during the 2020–21 NCAA Division I women's basketball season. The team was led by fifth-year head coach Jim Jabir, and played their home games at the FAU Arena in Boca Raton, Florida as a member of Conference USA (C-USA).

== Schedule and results ==
Date time, TV	Rank^{#}	Opponent^{#}	Result	Record	Site (attendance) city, state
Non-conference regular season
November 30, 2020*; 5:00 p.m.		North Florida	W 93–81	1–0	FAU Arena (198); Boca Raton, FL
December 3, 2020*; 7:30 p.m.		at Miami	L 61–73	1–1	Watsco Center; Coral Gables, FL
December 7, 2020*; 8:00 p.m.		at Florida	L 76–88	1–2	O'Connell Center (909); Gainesville, FL
December 18, 2020*; 5:00 p.m.		Florida Memorial	W 104–73	2–2	FAU Arena (163); Boca Raton, FL
C-USA regular season
January 1, 2021; 7:00 p.m.		at Middle Tennessee	L 65–84	2–3 (0–1)	Murphy Center (100); Murfreesboro, TN
January 2, 2021; 3:00 p.m.		at Middle Tennessee	L 64–66	2–4 (0–2)	Murphy Center (100); Murfreesboro, TN
January 8, 2021; 5:00 p.m.		Old Dominion	L 56–71	2–5 (0–3)	FAU Arena (177); Boca Raton, FL
January 9, 2021; 2:00 p.m.		Old Dominion	L 72–77	2–6 (0–4)	FAU Arena (180); Boca Raton, FL
January 15, 2021; 5:00 p.m.		FIU	W 73–69	3–6 (1–4)	FAU Arena (253); Boca Raton, FL
January 16, 2021; 4:00 p.m.		FIU	L 62–65	3–7 (1–5)	Ocean Bank Convocation Center (105); Miami, FL
January 22, 2021; 3:00 p.m.		at Charlotte	Postponed (Note: Game was postponed due to COVID-19 pandemic-related issues.)		Dale F. Halton Arena; Charlotte, NC
January 23, 2021; 3:00 p.m.		at Charlotte	Postponed		Dale F. Halton Arena; Charlotte, NC
January 29, 2021; 5:00 p.m.		Marshall	Canceled (Note: Game was canceled due to COVID-19 pandemic-related issues.)		FAU Arena; Boca Raton, FL
January 30, 2021; 2:00 p.m.		Marshall	Canceled		FAU Arena; Boca Raton, FL
February 5, 2021; 7:00 p.m.		at Western Kentucky	L 64–71	3–8 (1–6)	E. A. Diddle Arena (513); Bowling Green, KY
February 6, 2021; 7:00 p.m.		Western Kentucky	W 75–70	4–8 (2–6)	E. A. Diddle Arena (582); Bowling Green, KY
February 12, 2021; 5:00 p.m.		UTSA	W 72–59	5–8 (3–6)	FAU Arena (182); Boca Raton, FL
February 13, 2021; 2:00 p.m.		UTSA	W 79–50	6–8 (4–6)	FAU Arena (205); Boca Raton, FL
February 21, 2021; 4:00 p.m.		at UTEP	W 67–62	7–8 (5–6)	Don Haskins Center (555); El Paso, TX
February 22, 2021; 9:00 p.m.		at UTEP	L 62–92	7–9 (5–7)	Don Haskins Center (314); El Paso, TX
February 26, 2021; 5:00 p.m.		Southern Miss	W 78–63	8–9 (6–7)	FAU Arena (228); Boca Raton, FL
February 27, 2021; 2:00 p.m.		Southern Miss	W 86–61	9–9 (7–7)	FAU Arena (239); Boca Raton, FL
March 5, 2021; 3:00 p.m.		at Charlotte	W 77–73	10–9 (8–7)	Dale F. Halton Arena (149); Charlotte, NC
March 6, 2021; 3:00 p.m.		at Charlotte	L 73–83	10–10 (8–8)	Dale F. Halton Arena (247); Charlotte, NC
C-USA tournament
March 10, 2021; 3:30 p.m.	(3E)	vs. (6W) UAB; Second round	W 72–66	11–10	Ford Center at The Star (623); Frisco, TX
March 11, 2021; 3:30 p.m.	(3E)	vs. (2W) UTEP; Quarterfinals	L 67–74	11–11	Ford Center at The Star (507); Frisco, TX
*Non-conference game. ^{#}Rankings from AP poll. (#) Tournament seedings in parentheses. All times are in Central.

== See also ==
- 2020–21 Florida Atlantic Owls men's basketball team
