= 2020–21 UTEP Miners women's basketball team =

American college basketball season

2020–21 UTEP Miners women's basketball
- Conference: Conference USA
- West Division
- Record: 17-8 (13-5 CUSA)
- Head coach: Kevin Baker (4th season)
- Associate head coach: Todd Buchanan
- Assistant coaches: Anthony Anderson; Heather Karner
- Home arena: Don Haskins Center

2020–21 Conference USA women's basketball standings
	Conf.				Overall
Team	W		L	PCT	W		L	PCT
East
Middle Tennessee †	12	–	4	.750	17	–	8	.680
Charlotte	9	–	5	.643	10	–	12	.455
FIU	8	–	8	.500	15	–	13	.536
Florida Atlantic	8	–	8	.500	11	–	11	.500
Old Dominion	7	–	9	.438	13	–	11	.542
Marshall	7	–	9	.438	8	–	11	.421
Western Kentucky	6	–	10	.375	7	–	16	.304
West
Rice	12	–	2	.857	23	–	4	.852
UTEP	13	–	5	.722	17	–	8	.680
North Texas	10	–	4	.714	13	–	7	.650
Louisiana Tech	8	–	8	.500	14	–	10	.583
Southern Miss	5	–	11	.313	7	–	12	.368
UAB	3	–	11	.214	10	–	13	.435
UTSA	0	–	14	.000	2	–	18	.100
† 2021 C-USA tournament winner As of March 13, 2021; Rankings from AP poll

The 2020–21 UTEP Miners women's basketball team represented the University of Texas at El Paso during the 2020–21 NCAA Division I women's basketball season. The team was led by fourth-year head coach Kevin Baker, and played their home games at the Don Haskins Center in El Paso, Texas as a member of Conference USA.

== Schedule and results ==
Date time, TV	Rank^{#}	Opponent^{#}	Result	Record	Site (attendance) city, state
Non-conference regular season
November 25, 2020*; 12:00 p.m.		New Mexico State	W 80–76 ^{OT}	1–0	Don Haskins Center; El Paso, TX
November 28, 2020*; 1:00 p.m.		Incarnate Word	W 67–63	2–0	Don Haskins Center; El Paso, TX
December 2, 2020*; 6:00 p.m.		at New Mexico State	W 81–73 ^{OT}	3–0	Don Haskins Center; El Paso, TX
December 5, 2020*; 1:00 p.m.		Sam Houston State	Canceled (Note: Game was canceled due to COVID-19 pandemic related issues.)		Don Haskins Center; El Paso, TX
December 13, 2020*; 2:00 p.m.		at Utah State	L 65–68	3–1	Smith Spectrum (227); Logan, UT
December 17, 2020*; 6:00 p.m.		at Northern Arizona	L 75–83	3–2	Walkup Skydome; Flagstaff, AZ
CUSA regular season
January 1, 2021; 1:00 p.m.		Southern Miss	W 83–65	4–2 (1–0)	Don Haskins Center; El Paso, TX
January 2, 2021; 12:00 p.m.		Southern Miss	W 74–72	5–2 (2–0)	Don Haskins Center; El Paso, TX
January 8, 2021; 12:00 p.m.		at Rice	L 68–74	5–3 (2–1)	Tudor Fieldhouse; Houston, TX
January 9, 2021; 12:00 p.m.		at Rice	L 43–55	5–4 (2–2)	Tudor Fieldhouse; Houston, TX
January 15, 2021; 7:00 p.m.		North Texas	L 59–67	5–5 (2–3)	Don Haskins Center (282); El Paso, TX
January 16, 2021; 4:00 p.m.		North Texas	W 62–52	6–5 (3–3)	Don Haskins Center (261); El Paso, TX
January 22, 2021; 5:30 p.m.		at Louisiana Tech	W 61–58	7–5 (4–3)	Thomas Assembly Center (1,200); Ruston, LA
January 23, 2021; 3:00 p.m.		at Louisiana Tech	W 75–67	8–5 (5–3)	Thomas Assembly Center (1,200); Ruston, LA
January 28, 2021; 7:00 p.m.		UTSA	W 82–56	9–5 (6–3)	Don Haskins Center (246); El Paso, TX
January 30, 2021; 12:00 p.m.		at UTSA	W 67–51	10–5 (7–3)	Convocation Center (164); San Antonio, TX
February 5, 2021; 7:00 p.m.		UAB	W 74–53	11–5 (8–3)	Don Haskins Center (292); El Paso, TX
February 6, 2021; 4:00 p.m.		UAB	W 68–64 ^{OT}	12–5 (9–3)	Don Haskins Center (263); El Paso, TX
February 12, 2021; 5:00 p.m.		at FIU	W 76–64	13–5 (10–3)	FIU Arena (71); Miami, FL
February 13, 2021; 12:00 p.m.		at FIU	W 73–57	14–5 (11–3)	FIU Arena; Miami, FL
February 21, 2021; 2:00 p.m.		Florida Atlantic	L 62–67	14–6 (11–4)	Don Haskins Center (555); El Paso, TX
February 22, 2021; 7:00 p.m.		Florida Atlantic	W 92–62	15–6 (12–4)	Don Haskins Center (314); El Paso, TX
February 26, 2021; 1:00 p.m.		at Charlotte	L 53–62	15–7 (12–5)	Dale F. Halton Arena (34); Charlotte, NC
February 27, 2021; 1:00 p.m.		at Charlotte	W 71–68	16–7 (13–5)	Dale F. Halton Arena (202); Charlotte, NC
CUSA Tournament
March 11, 2021; 2:30 p.m.	(2W)	vs. (3E) Florida Atlantic; Quarterfinals	W 74–67	17–7	Ford Center at The Star (507); Frisco, TX
March 12, 2021; 8:30 p.m.	(2W)	vs. (1E) Middle Tennessee; Semifinals	L 58–74	17–8	Ford Center at The Star (413); Frisco, TX
*Non-conference game. ^{#}Rankings from AP Poll. (#) Tournament seedings in parentheses. All times are in Mountain.

== See also ==
- 2020–21 UTEP Miners men's basketball team
