= 2020–21 Louisiana Tech Lady Techsters basketball team =

American college basketball season

2020–21 Louisiana Tech Lady Techsters basketball
- Conference: Conference USA
- West Division
- Record: 14–10 (8–8 CUSA)
- Head coach: Brooke Stoehr & Scott Stoehr (5th season)
- Assistant coaches: Bojan Jankovic; Kasondra McKay
- Home arena: Thomas Assembly Center

2020–21 Conference USA women's basketball standings
	Conf.				Overall
Team	W		L	PCT	W		L	PCT
East
Middle Tennessee †	12	–	4	.750	17	–	8	.680
Charlotte	9	–	5	.643	10	–	12	.455
FIU	8	–	8	.500	15	–	13	.536
Florida Atlantic	8	–	8	.500	11	–	11	.500
Old Dominion	7	–	9	.438	13	–	11	.542
Marshall	7	–	9	.438	8	–	11	.421
Western Kentucky	6	–	10	.375	7	–	16	.304
West
Rice	12	–	2	.857	23	–	4	.852
UTEP	13	–	5	.722	17	–	8	.680
North Texas	10	–	4	.714	13	–	7	.650
Louisiana Tech	8	–	8	.500	14	–	10	.583
Southern Miss	5	–	11	.313	7	–	12	.368
UAB	3	–	11	.214	10	–	13	.435
UTSA	0	–	14	.000	2	–	18	.100
† 2021 C-USA tournament winner As of March 13, 2021; Rankings from AP poll

The 2020–21 Louisiana Tech Lady Techsters basketball team represented Louisiana Tech University during the 2020–21 NCAA Division I women's basketball season. The team was led by fifth-year head coaches Brooke Stoehr & Scott Stoehr, and played their home games at the Thomas Assembly Center in Ruston, Louisiana as a member of Conference USA.

== Schedule and results ==
Date time, TV	Rank^{#}	Opponent^{#}	Result	Record	Site (attendance) city, state
Non-conference regular season
November 25, 2020*; 6:30 p.m.		McNeese State	W 90–45	1–0	Thomas Assembly Center (1,200); Ruston, LA
November 30, 2020*; 6:30 p.m.		Grambling State	W 79–69	2–0	Thomas Assembly Center (1,200); Ruston, LA
December 2, 2020*; 7:00 p.m.		at Texas	L 57–84	2–1	Frank Erwin Center (958); Austin, TX
December 8, 2020*; 6:30 p.m.		Jackson State	W 73–66	3–1	Thomas Assembly Center (1,200); Ruston, LA
December 15, 2020*; 2:00 p.m.		Arkansas–Pine Bluff	Canceled (Note: Game was canceled due to COVID-19 pandemic related issues.)		Thomas Assembly Center; Ruston, LA
December 17, 2020*; 6:30 p.m.		Louisiana–Monroe	W 63–45	4–1	Thomas Assembly Center (1,200); Ruston, LA
December 20, 2020*; 2:00 p.m.		Louisiana	W 68–65	5–1	Thomas Assembly Center (1,200); Ruston, LA
CUSA regular season
January 1, 2021; 5:00 p.m.		at Marshall	W 61–51 ^{OT}	6–1 (1–0)	Cam Henderson Center (381); Huntington, WV
January 2, 2021; 2:00 p.m.		at Marshall	L 57–61	6–2 (1–1)	Cam Henderson Center (366); Huntington, WV
January 8, 2021; 6:30 p.m.		Western Kentucky	L 55–61	6–3 (1–2)	Thomas Assembly Center (1,200); Ruston, LA
January 9, 2021; 4:00 p.m.		Western Kentucky	W 58–52	7–3 (2–2)	Thomas Assembly Center (1,200); Ruston, LA
January 15, 2021; 6:00 p.m.		at UTSA	W 69–51	8–3 (3–2)	Convocation Center (122); San Antonio, TX
January 16, 2021; 4:00 p.m.		at UTSA	W 74–48	9–3 (4–2)	Convocation Center (153); San Antonio, TX
January 22, 2021; 6:30 p.m.		UTEP	L 58–61	9–4 (4–3)	Thomas Assembly Center (1,200); Ruston, LA
January 23, 2021; 4:00 p.m.		UTEP	L 67–75	9–5 (4–4)	Thomas Assembly Center (1,200); Ruston, LA
January 28, 2021; 6:30 p.m.		Southern Miss	W 77–60	10–5 (5–4)	Thomas Assembly Center (1,200); Ruston, LA
January 30, 2021; 4:00 p.m.		at Southern Miss	L 44–57	10–6 (5–5)	Reed Green Coliseum (1,200); Hattiesburg, MS
February 5, 2021; 6:30 p.m.		North Texas	W 60–55	11–6 (6–5)	Thomas Assembly Center (1,200); Ruston, LA
February 6, 2021; 4:00 p.m.		North Texas	L 58–63	11–7 (6–6)	Thomas Assembly Center (1,200); Ruston, LA
February 12, 2021; 2:00 p.m.		at UAB	W 75–51	12–7 (7–6)	Bartow Arena (222); Birmingham, AL
February 13, 2021; 2:00 p.m.		at UAB	W 83–61	13–7 (8–6)	Bartow Arena (280); Birmingham, AL
February 20, 2021; 2:00 p.m.		Middle Tennessee	Canceled (Note: Game was canceled due to weather concerns.)		Thomas Assembly Center; Ruston, LA
February 21, 2021; 12:00 p.m.		Middle Tennessee	Canceled		Thomas Assembly Center; Ruston, LA
February 26, 2021; 2:00 p.m.		at Rice	L 50–73	13–8 (8–7)	Tudor Fieldhouse; Houston, TX
February 27, 2021; 4:00 p.m.		at Rice	L 53–64	13–9 (8–8)	Tudor Fieldhouse; Houston, TX
CUSA Tournament
March 10, 2021; 2:00 p.m.	(4W)	vs. (5E) Marshall; Second Round	W 50–48	14–9	Ford Center at The Star (623); Frisco, TX
March 11, 2021; 2:00 p.m.	(4W)	vs. (1E) Middle Tennessee; Quarterfinals	L 71–77	14–10	Ford Center at The Star (507); Frisco, TX
*Non-conference game. ^{#}Rankings from AP Poll. (#) Tournament seedings in parentheses. All times are in Central.

== See also ==
- 2020–21 Louisiana Tech Bulldogs basketball team
