= 2021 Conference USA women's basketball tournament =

- Classification: Division I
- Season: 2020–21
- Teams: 12
- Site: The Ford Center at The Star; Frisco, Texas
- Champions: Middle Tennessee (17th title)
- Winning coach: Rick Insell (16th title)
- MVP: Anastasia Hayes (MTSU)
- Television: ESPN+, Stadium, CBSSN

2020–21 Conference USA women's basketball standings
| | Conf. | | | | Overall |
| Team | W | | L | PCT | W | | L | PCT |
|---|---|---|---|---|---|---|---|---|
East
| Middle Tennessee † | 12 | – | 4 | .750 | 17 | – | 8 | .680 |
| Charlotte | 9 | – | 5 | .643 | 10 | – | 12 | .455 |
| FIU | 8 | – | 8 | .500 | 15 | – | 13 | .536 |
| Florida Atlantic | 8 | – | 8 | .500 | 11 | – | 11 | .500 |
| Old Dominion | 7 | – | 9 | .438 | 13 | – | 11 | .542 |
| Marshall | 7 | – | 9 | .438 | 8 | – | 11 | .421 |
| Western Kentucky | 6 | – | 10 | .375 | 7 | – | 16 | .304 |
West
| Rice | 12 | – | 2 | .857 | 23 | – | 4 | .852 |
| UTEP | 13 | – | 5 | .722 | 17 | – | 8 | .680 |
| North Texas | 10 | – | 4 | .714 | 13 | – | 7 | .650 |
| Louisiana Tech | 8 | – | 8 | .500 | 14 | – | 10 | .583 |
| Southern Miss | 5 | – | 11 | .313 | 7 | – | 12 | .368 |
| UAB | 3 | – | 11 | .214 | 10 | – | 13 | .435 |
| UTSA | 0 | – | 14 | .000 | 2 | – | 18 | .100 |
† 2021 C-USA tournament winner As of March 13, 2021; Rankings from AP poll

The 2021 Conference USA women's basketball tournament was a postseason women's basketball tournament for Conference USA that was held at The Ford Center at The Star in Frisco, Texas, from March 10 through March 13, 2021. Middle Tennessee won the tournament, its 17th title, earning a bid to the NCAA tournament.

== Seeds ==
All 14 teams will qualify for the tournament. Teams will be seeded by record within their respective conference divisions, however the tournament will blend the divisional seed opponents in each round.

| East seed | School | Conf. | Over. |
|---|---|---|---|
| 1 | Middle Tennessee | 12–4 | 14–7 |
| 2 | Charlotte | 9–5 | 10–9 |
| 3 | Florida Atlantic | 8–8 | 10–10 |
| 4 | FIU | 8–8 | 12–11 |
| 5 | Marshall | 7–9 | 8–10 |
| 6 | Old Dominion | 7–9 | 10–10 |
| 7 | Western Kentucky | 6–10 | 7–15 |
| West seed | School | Conf. | Over. |
| 1 | Rice | 12–2 | 16–3 |
| 2 | UTEP | 13–5 | 16–7 |
| 3 | North Texas | 10–4 | 13–16 |
| 4 | Louisiana Tech | 8–8 | 13–9 |
| 5 | Southern Miss | 5–11 | 7–11 |
| 6 | UAB | 3–11 | 9–12 |
| 7 | UTSA | 0–14 | 2–17 |

== Schedule ==
| Session | Game | Time* | Matchup** | Television | Attendance |
First round – Tuesday, March 9
| 1 | 1 | 4:00 pm | 6E Old Dominion 83 vs. 7E Western Kentucky 77 ^{OT} | ESPN+ | 283 |
| 1 | 2 | 4:30 pm | 6W UAB 80 vs. 7W UTSA 66 | ESPN+ | 283 |
Second round – Wednesday, March 10
| 2 | 3 | 11:00 am | 4E FIU 85 vs. 5W Southern Mississippi 75 | ESPN+ | |
| 2 | 4 | 11:30 am | 3W North Texas 66 vs. 6E Old Dominion 71 | ESPN+ | |
| 3 | 5 | 2:00 pm | 4W Louisiana Tech 50 vs. 5E Marshall 48 | ESPN+ | 623 |
| 3 | 6 | 2:30 pm | 3E FAU 72 vs. 6W UAB 66 | ESPN+ | 623 |
Quarterfinals – Thursday, March 11
| 4 | 7 | 11:00 am | 1W Rice 77 vs. 4E FIU 60 | Stadium | |
| 4 | 8 | 11:30 am | 2E Charlotte 89 vs. 6E Old Dominion 90 ^{2OT} | ESPN+ | |
| 5 | 9 | 2:00 pm | 1E MTSU 77 vs. 4W Louisiana Tech 71 | Stadium | |
| 5 | 10 | 2:30 pm | 2W UTEP 74 vs. 3E FAU 67 | ESPN+ | |
Semifinals – Friday, March 12
| 6 | 11 | 5:30 pm | 1W Rice 62 vs. 6E Old Dominion 60 | Stadium | |
| 6 | 12 | 8:30 pm | 1E MTSU 74 vs. 2W UTEP 58 | Stadium | |
Championship – Saturday, March 13
| 7 | 13 | 5:00 pm | 1W Rice 65 vs. 1E MTSU 68 | CBSSN | |
*Game times in CT. ** – Rankings denote division seed

== Bracket ==
First round Tuesday, March 9 ESPN+
6E | Old Dominion | 83*
7E | Western Kentucky | 77
6W | UAB | 80
7W | UTSA | 66

Second round Wednesday, March 10; ESPN+
4E | FIU | 85
5W | Southern Mississippi | 75
3W | North Texas | 66
6E | Old Dominion | 71
4W | Louisiana Tech | 50
5E | Marshall | 48
3E | FAU | 72
6W | UAB | 66

Quarterfinals; Thursday, March 11; ESPN+/Stadium
1W | Rice | 77
4E | FIU | 60
2E | Charlotte | 89
6E | Old Dominion | 90**
1E | MTSU | 77
4W | Louisiana Tech | 71
2W | UTEP | 74
3E | FAU | 67

Semifinals; Friday, March 12; Stadium
1W | Rice | 62
6E | Old Dominion | 60
1E | MTSU | 74
2W | UTEP | 58

Championship; Saturday, March 13; CBSSN
1W | Rice | 65
1E | MTSU | 68

* denotes overtime

== See also ==
- 2021 Conference USA men's basketball tournament
