= 2020–21 Rice Owls women's basketball team =

American college basketball season

2020–21 Rice Owls women's basketball

WNIT champions C-USA regular season and West division champions
- Conference: Conference USA
- West Division
- Record: 23–4 (12-2 CUSA)
- Head coach: Tina Langley (6th season)
- Assistant coaches: Latara King; Steven Asher; Nolan Wilson
- Home arena: Tudor Fieldhouse

2020–21 Conference USA women's basketball standings
	Conf.				Overall
Team	W		L	PCT	W		L	PCT
East
Middle Tennessee †	12	–	4	.750	17	–	8	.680
Charlotte	9	–	5	.643	10	–	12	.455
FIU	8	–	8	.500	15	–	13	.536
Florida Atlantic	8	–	8	.500	11	–	11	.500
Old Dominion	7	–	9	.438	13	–	11	.542
Marshall	7	–	9	.438	8	–	11	.421
Western Kentucky	6	–	10	.375	7	–	16	.304
West
Rice	12	–	2	.857	23	–	4	.852
UTEP	13	–	5	.722	17	–	8	.680
North Texas	10	–	4	.714	13	–	7	.650
Louisiana Tech	8	–	8	.500	14	–	10	.583
Southern Miss	5	–	11	.313	7	–	12	.368
UAB	3	–	11	.214	10	–	13	.435
UTSA	0	–	14	.000	2	–	18	.100
† 2021 C-USA tournament winner As of March 13, 2021; Rankings from AP poll

The 2020–21 Rice Owls women's basketball team represented Rice University during the 2020–21 NCAA Division I women's basketball season. The team was led by sixth-year head coach Tina Langley, and played their home games at the Tudor Fieldhouse in Houston, Texas as a member of Conference USA.

== Schedule and results ==
Date time, TV	Rank^{#}	Opponent^{#}	Result	Record	Site (attendance) city, state
Non-conference regular season
November 25, 2020*; 2:00 p.m.		Houston Baptist	W 83–54	1–0	Tudor Fieldhouse; Houston, TX
November 28, 2020*; 2:00 p.m.		at Little Rock	W 66–54	2–0	Jack Stephens Center (222); Little Rock, AR
December 2, 2020*; 5:00 p.m.		at UT Arlington	Canceled (Note: Game was canceled due to COVID-19 pandemic related issues.)		College Park Center; Arlington, TX
December 5, 2020*; 6:00 p.m.		at Texas Tech	W 81–62	3–0	United Supermarkets Arena (2,714); Lubbock, TX
December 11, 2020*; 2:00 p.m.		Texas Southern	Canceled		Tudor Fieldhouse; Houston, TX
December 16, 2020*; 2:00 p.m.		Louisiana	W 83–51	4–0	Tudor Fieldhouse; Houston, TX
December 20, 2020*; 2:00 p.m.		at No. 10 Texas A&M	L 53–57	4–1	Reed Arena (693); College Station, TX
CUSA regular season
January 1, 2021; 2:00 p.m.		at UTSA	W 78–53	5–1 (1–0)	Convocation Center (157); San Antonio, TX
January 2, 2021; 1:00 p.m.		at UTSA	W 69–57	6–1 (2–0)	Convocation Center (165); San Antonio, TX
January 8, 2021; 1:00 p.m.		UTEP	W 74–68	7–1 (3–0)	Tudor Fieldhouse; Houston, TX
January 9, 2021; 1:00 p.m.		UTEP	W 55–43	8–1 (4–0)	Tudor Fieldhouse; Houston, TX
January 15, 2021; 5:30 p.m.		at Old Dominion	W 77–66	9–1 (5–0)	Chartway Arena (250); Norfolk, VA
January 16, 2021; 3:00 p.m.		at Old Dominion	W 67–59	10–1 (6–0)	Chartway Arena (250); Norfolk, VA
January 22, 2021; 2:00 p.m.		UAB	Postponed (Note: Game was postponed due to COVID-19 pandemic related issues.)		Tudor Fieldhouse; Houston, TX
January 23, 2021; 2:00 p.m.		UAB	Postponed		Tudor Fieldhouse; Houston, TX
January 28, 2021; 6:30 p.m.		at North Texas	Postponed		UNT Coliseum; Denton, TX
January 30, 2021; 2:00 p.m.		North Texas	Postponed		Tudor Fieldhouse; Houston, TX
February 5, 2021; 6:00 p.m.		at Southern Miss	Postponed		Reed Green Coliseum; Hattiesburg, MS
February 6, 2021; 4:00 p.m.		at Southern Miss	Postponed		Reed Green Coliseum; Hattiesburg, MS
February 12, 2021; 2:00 p.m.		Western Kentucky	W 64–55	11–1 (7–0)	Tudor Fieldhouse; Houston, TX
February 13, 2021; 4:00 p.m.		Western Kentucky	W 77–74	12–1 (8–0)	Tudor Fieldhouse; Houston, TX
February 19, 2021; 5:00 p.m.		at Marshall	W 64–48	13–1 (9–0)	Cam Henderson Center (434); Huntington, WV
February 20, 2021; 2:00 p.m.		at Marshall	L 56–68	13–2 (9–1)	Cam Henderson Center (455); Huntington, WV
February 26, 2021; 2:00 p.m.		Louisiana Tech	W 73–50	14–2 (10–1)	Tudor Fieldhouse; Houston, TX
February 27, 2021; 4:00 p.m.		Louisiana Tech	W 64–53	15–2 (11–1)	Tudor Fieldhouse; Houston, TX
March 4, 2021; 7:00 p.m.		at North Texas	W 64–58	16–2 (12–1)	UNT Coliseum (839); Denton, TX
March 6, 2021; 4:00 p.m.		North Texas	L 66–75	16–3 (12–2)	Tudor Fieldhouse; Houston, TX
CUSA Tournament
March 11, 2021; 11:00 a.m.	(1W)	vs. (4E) FIU; Quarterfinals	W 77–60	17–3	Ford Center at The Star; Frisco, TX
March 12, 2021; 5:30 p.m.	(1W)	vs. (6E) Old Dominion; Semifinals	W 62–60	18–3	Ford Center at The Star; Frisco, TX
March 13, 2021; 5:00 p.m.	(1W)	vs. (1E) Middle Tennessee; Championship	L 65–68	18–4	Ford Center at The Star; Frisco, TX
WNIT
March 19, 2021; 11:00 a.m.		vs. Arizona State; First Round – Fort Worth Regional	W 48–36	19–4	Wilkerson–Greines Activity Center; Fort Worth, TX
March 20, 2021; 5:00 p.m.		vs. Fresno State; Second Round – Fort Worth Regional	W 87–73	20–4	Wilkerson–Greines Activity Center; Fort Worth, TX
March 22, 2021; 7:00 p.m.		vs. California Baptist; Quarterfinals – Fort Worth Regional	W 79–55	21–4	Wilkerson–Greines Activity Center; Fort Worth, TX
March 26, 2021; 4:00 p.m.		vs. Delaware; Semifinals	W 85–75	22–4	My Town Movers Fieldhouse; Collierville, TN
March 28, 2021; 1:00 p.m.		vs. Ole Miss; Championship Game	W 71–58	23–4	My Town Movers Fieldhouse; Collierville, TN
*Non-conference game. ^{#}Rankings from AP Poll. (#) Tournament seedings in parentheses. All times are in Central.

== See also ==
- 2020–21 Rice Owls men's basketball team
