= 2021 Women's Basketball Invitational =

American women's college basketball tournament

- Season: 2020–21
- Teams: 8
- Finals site: William Exum Center, Frankfort, Kentucky
- Champions: Cleveland State

The 2021 Women's Basketball Invitational (WBI) was a single-elimination tournament consisting of eight National Collegiate Athletic Association (NCAA) Division I teams that were not selected to participate in the 2021 NCAA Division I women's basketball tournament or 2021 Women's National Invitation Tournament. The 2021 field was announced on March 15. The tournament was held March 19–21 at the William Exum Center on the campus of Kentucky State University in Frankfort, Kentucky. The format was an 8-team tournament with a winners and consolation bracket, guaranteeing all participating teams three games. Cleveland State beat Portland in the final.

== Bracket ==
5th place game March 21
Manhattan	58
FIU	59
7th place game
Loyola-Chicago	74
Abilene Christian	55

Consolation 2nd round March 20
Manhattan	56
Loyola-Chicago	51
Abilene Christian	61
FIU	78

Quarterfinals; March 19
Cleveland State	68
Manhattan	55
Loyola–Chicago	45
Stetson	49
Portland	67
Abilene Christian	42
FIU	69
Northern Arizona	82

Semifinals; March 20
Cleveland State	64
Stetson	54
Portland	80
Northern Arizona	65

Championship; March 21
Cleveland State	67
Portland	64
3rd place game
Stetson	48
Northern Arizona	51

== See also ==
- 2021 NCAA Division I women's basketball tournament
- 2021 Women's National Invitation Tournament
