= 2020–21 Middle Tennessee Blue Raiders women's basketball team =

American college basketball season

2020–21 Middle Tennessee Blue Raiders women's basketball

C-USA East division and tournament champions

NCAA tournament, first round
- Conference: Conference USA
- East Division
- Record: 17–7 (12–4 C-USA)
- Head coach: Rick Insell (16th season)
- Assistant coaches: Kim Brewton; Nina Davis; Matt Insell
- Home arena: Murphy Center

2020–21 Conference USA women's basketball standings
	Conf.				Overall
Team	W		L	PCT	W		L	PCT
East
Middle Tennessee †	12	–	4	.750	17	–	8	.680
Charlotte	9	–	5	.643	10	–	12	.455
FIU	8	–	8	.500	15	–	13	.536
Florida Atlantic	8	–	8	.500	11	–	11	.500
Old Dominion	7	–	9	.438	13	–	11	.542
Marshall	7	–	9	.438	8	–	11	.421
Western Kentucky	6	–	10	.375	7	–	16	.304
West
Rice	12	–	2	.857	23	–	4	.852
UTEP	13	–	5	.722	17	–	8	.680
North Texas	10	–	4	.714	13	–	7	.650
Louisiana Tech	8	–	8	.500	14	–	10	.583
Southern Miss	5	–	11	.313	7	–	12	.368
UAB	3	–	11	.214	10	–	13	.435
UTSA	0	–	14	.000	2	–	18	.100
† 2021 C-USA tournament winner As of March 13, 2021; Rankings from AP poll

The 2020–21 Middle Tennessee Blue Raiders women's basketball team represented Middle Tennessee State University during the 2020–21 NCAA Division I women's basketball season. The team was led by sixteenth-year head coach Rick Insell, and played their home games at the Murphy Center in Murfreesboro, Tennessee as a member of Conference USA.

== Schedule and results ==
Date time, TV	Rank^{#}	Opponent^{#}	Result	Record	Site (attendance) city, state
Non-conference regular season
November 25, 2020*; 6:30 a.m.		No. 5 Louisville	Canceled (Note: Game was canceled due to COVID-19 pandemic related issues.)		Murphy Center; Murfreesboro, TN
November 29, 2020*; 2:00 p.m.		Vanderbilt	Canceled		Murphy Center; Murfreesboro, TN
December 6, 2020*; 5:30 p.m.		Belmont	L 64–70	0–1	Murphy Center (100); Murfreesboro, TN
December 9, 2020*; 6:30 p.m.		Tulane	L 78–81	0–2	Murphy Center; Murfreesboro, TN
December 13, 2020*; 1:00 p.m.		at TCU	L 77–83	0–3	Schollmaier Arena (736); Fort Worth, TX
December 17, 2020*; 6:30 a.m.		Troy	W 92–76	1–3	Murphy Center (100); Murfreesboro, TN
December 20, 2020*; 2:00 p.m.		Lipscomb	W 84–64	2–3	Murphy Center (100); Murfreesboro, TN
C-USA regular season
January 1, 2021; 6:00 p.m.		Florida Atlantic	W 84–65	3–3 (1–0)	Murphy Center (100); Murfreesboro, TN
January 2, 2021; 2:00 p.m.		Florida Atlantic	W 66–64	4–3 (2–0)	Murphy Center (100); Murfreesboro, TN
January 8, 2021; 7:00 p.m.		at FIU	W 69–65	5–3 (3–0)	Ocean Bank Convocation Center (115); Miami, FL
January 9, 2021; 2:00 p.m.		at FIU	W 99–89	6–3 (4–0)	Ocean Bank Convocation Center (101); Miami, FL
January 15, 2021; 6:00 p.m.		Southern Miss	W 78–58	7–3 (5–0)	Murphy Center (100); Murfreesboro, TN
January 16, 2021; 4:00 p.m.		Southern Miss	L 61–69	7–4 (5–1)	Murphy Center (100); Murfreesboro, TN
January 22, 2021; 6:00 p.m.		at Western Kentucky	W 75–65	8–4 (6–1)	E. A. Diddle Arena (527); Bowling Green, KY
January 23, 2021; 6:00 p.m.		at Western Kentucky	W 77–60	9–4 (7–1)	E. A. Diddle Arena (601); Bowling Green, KY
January 28, 2021; 6:00 p.m.		at UAB	W 81–78 ^{OT}	10–4 (8–1)	Bartow Arena (305); Birmingham, AL
January 30, 2021; 4:00 p.m.		UAB	W 95–68	11–4 (9–1)	Murphy Center (100); Murfreesboro, TN
February 5, 2021; 3:00 p.m.		at Charlotte	W 77–70	12–4 (10–1)	Dale F. Halton Arena; Charlotte, NC
February 6, 2021; 2:00 p.m.		at Charlotte	L 72–82	12–5 (10–2)	Dale F. Halton Arena; Charlotte, NC
February 12, 2021		Marshall	Postponed (Note: Game was postponed due to COVID-19 pandemic concerns.)		Murphy Center; Murfreesboro, TN
February 13, 2021		Marshall	Postponed		Murphy Center; Murfreesboro, TN
February 20, 2021; 2:00 p.m.		at Louisiana Tech	Canceled (Note: Game was canceled due to weather concerns.)		Thomas Assembly Center; Ruston, LA
February 21, 2021; 12:00 p.m.		at Louisiana Tech	Canceled		Thomas Assembly Center; Ruston, LA
February 26, 2021; 6:00 p.m.		Old Dominion	L 57–74	12–6 (10–3)	Murphy Center (1,159); Murfreesboro, TN
February 27, 2021; 4:00 p.m.		Old Dominion	W 74–70	13–6 (11–3)	Murphy Center (1,150); Murfreesboro, TN
March 4, 2021; 6:00 p.m.		Marshall	L 49–72	13–7 (11–4)	Murphy Center (1,150); Murfreesboro, TN
March 5, 2021; 6:00 p.m.		Marshall	W 61–54	14–7 (12–4)	Murphy Center (1,150); Murfreesboro, TN
C-USA tournament
March 11, 2021; 2:00 p.m.	(1E)	vs. (4W) Louisiana Tech; Quarterfinals	W 77–71	15–7	Ford Center at The Star (507); Frisco, TX
March 12, 2021; 8:30 p.m.	(1E)	vs. (2W) UTEP; Semifinals	W 74–58	16–7	Ford Center at The Star (413); Frisco, TX
March 13, 2021; 5:30 p.m.	(1E)	vs. (1W) Rice; Championship	W 68–65	17–7	Ford Center at The Star; Frisco, TX
NCAA women's tournament
March 21, 2021*; 1:00 p.m.	(14 RW)	vs. (3 RW) Tennessee; First round	L 62–87	17–8	Frank Erwin Center; Austin, TX
*Non-conference game. ^{#}Rankings from AP poll. (#) Tournament seedings in parentheses. All times are in Central.

== See also ==
- 2020–21 Middle Tennessee Blue Raiders men's basketball team
