= 2020–21 NCAA Division I women's basketball rankings =

- Season: 2020–21
- NCAA Tournament: 2021
- Preseason No. 1: South Carolina
- NCAA Tournament Champions: Stanford
NCAA Division I women's basketball rankings


Two human polls make up the 2020–21 NCAA Division I women's basketball rankings, the AP Poll and the Coaches Poll, in addition to various publications' preseason polls.

== Legend ==
	Increase in ranking
	Decrease in ranking
	Not ranked previous week
Italics	Number of first place votes
(#–#)	Win–loss record
т	Tied with team above or below also with this symbol

== AP Poll ==
	Preseason Nov 10	Week 2 Nov 30	Week 3 Dec 7	Week 4 Dec 14	Week 5 Dec 21	Week 6 Dec 28	Week 7 Jan 4	Week 8 Jan 11	Week 9 Jan 18	Week 10 Jan 25	Week 11 Feb 1	Week 12 Feb 8	Week 13 Feb 15	Week 14 Feb 22	Week 15 Mar 1	Week 16 Mar 8	Final Mar 15	
1.	South Carolina (29)	South Carolina (3–0) (29)	Stanford (24) (3–0)	Stanford (26) (4–0)	Stanford (26) (6–0)	Stanford (26) (7–0)	Stanford (27) (9–0)	Stanford (29) (10–0)	Louisville (20) (12–0)	Louisville (22) (14–0)	Louisville (26) (16–0)	South Carolina (15–1) (29)	UConn (16–1) (26)	UConn (18–1) (28)	UConn (27) (20–1)	UConn (22) (23–1)	UConn (24–1) (23)	1.
2.	Stanford (1)	Stanford (1–0) (1)	Louisville (2) (4–0)	Louisville (1) (5–0)	Louisville (1) (5–0)	Louisville (1) (5–0)	Louisville (7–0)	Louisville (10–0)	NC State (5) (10–0)	NC State (5) (11–0)	South Carolina (4) (14–1)	UConn (13–1)	South Carolina (17–2) (2)	NC State (15–2)	Texas A&M (2) (22–1)	Stanford (5) (25–2)	Stanford (25–2) (5)	2.
3.	Connecticut	Connecticut (0–0)	UConn (2) (0–0)	UConn (1) (1–0)	UConn (1) (4–0)	NC State (2) (8–0)	NC State (2) (10–0)т	NC State (1) (10–0)	UConn (1) (7–0)	UConn (1) (10–0)	UConn (11–1)	Louisville (18–1)	Louisville (19–1)	Texas A&M (20–1) (1)	NC State (17–2)	NC State (2) (20–2)	NC State (20–2) (2)	3.
4.	Baylor	Baylor (1–0)	NC State (2) (4–0)	NC State (2) (6–0)	NC State (2) (8–0)	UConn (1) (5–0)	UConn (1) (6–0)т	UConn (7–0)	South Carolina (2) (9–1)	South Carolina (2) (12–1)	NC State (11–1)	NC State (12–2) (1)	NC State (13–2)	Stanford (20–2) (1)	Stanford (1) (22–2)	Texas A&M (23–2)	Texas A&M (23–2)	4.
5.	Louisville	Louisville (2–0)	South Carolina (4–1)	South Carolina (4–1)	South Carolina (5–1)	South Carolina (5–1)	South Carolina (6–1)	South Carolina (8–1)	Stanford (1) (11–1)	UCLA (9–2)	UCLA (10–2)	Stanford (17–2)	Texas A&M (19–1)	South Carolina (18–3)	Louisville (21–2)	South Carolina (22–4)	Baylor (25–2)	5.
6.	Mississippi State	Mississippi State (1–0)	Arizona (3–0)	Arizona (4–0)	Arizona (6–0)	Arizona (7–0)	Baylor (8–1)	Baylor (8–1)	UCLA (8–2)	Stanford (12–2)	Stanford (15–2)	Texas A&M (18–1)	Stanford (18–2)	Louisville (20–2)	Baylor (19–2)	Baylor (21–2)	South Carolina (22–4)	6.
7.	Arizona	Arizona (1–0)	Baylor (2–1)	Baylor (3–1)т	Baylor (7–1)	Baylor (7–1)	Arizona (8–1)	Texas A&M (12–0)	Maryland (11–1)	Maryland (11–1)	Texas A&M (16–1)	Baylor (14–2)	Baylor (16–2)	Baylor (17–2)	South Carolina (19–4)	Louisville (23–3)т	Maryland (24–2)	7.
8.	NC State	NC State (2–0)	Oregon (4–0)	Oregon (7–0)т	Oregon (6–0)	Oregon (7–0)	Texas A&M (10–0)	UCLA (7–2)	Texas A&M (13–1)	Texas A&M (14–1)	Baylor (12–2)	UCLA (11–3)	UCLA (12–3)	Maryland (16–2)	Maryland (19–2)	Maryland (21–2)т	Louisville (23–3)	8.
9.	UCLA	UCLA (1–0)	Kentucky (4–0)	Kentucky (9–0)	Texas A&M (8–0)	Texas A&M (8–0)	UCLA (6–2)	Maryland (9–1)	Baylor (8–2)	Baylor (10–2)	Arizona (11–2)	Maryland (13–2)	Maryland (14–2)	Arizona (15–2)	UCLA (14–4)	Indiana (18–4)	UCLA (16–5)	9.
10.	Oregon	Oregon (1–0)	Texas A&M (4–0)	Texas A&M (6–0)	UCLA (5–1)	Arkansas (9–1)	Kentucky (9–1)	Oregon (9–2)	Arizona (10–2)	Arizona (11–2)	Maryland (12–2)	Arizona (11–2)	Arizona (14–2)	UCLA (13–4)	Indiana (16–4)	UCLA (16–5)	Georgia (20–6)	10.
11.	Kentucky	Kentucky (2–0)	UCLA (2–1)	UCLA (4–1)	Arkansas (8–1)	UCLA (5–2)	Oregon (8–1)	Arizona (8–2)	Michigan (10–0)	Oregon (11–3)	Ohio State (10–1)	Oregon (12–3)	Michigan (11–1)	Indiana (14–4)	Arizona (15–4)	Arizona (16–5)	Arizona (16–5)	11.
12.	Maryland	Texas A&M (2–0)	Mississippi State (2–1)	Arkansas (7–1)	Mississippi State (5–1)	Mississippi State (5–1)	Maryland (6–1)	Kentucky (9–3)	Kentucky (10–3)	Michigan (10–1)	Oregon (11–3)	Michigan (10–1)т	South Florida (11–1)	Michigan (13–2)	Michigan (13–3)	Georgia (20–6)	Indiana (18–5)	12.
13.	Texas A&M	Indiana (1–0)	Arkansas (5–1)	Mississippi State (2–1)	Kentucky (7–1)	Kentucky (7–1)	Arkansas (10–2)	Michigan (9–0)	Oregon (9–3)	South Florida (10–1)	Michigan (10–1)	Ohio State (12–2)т	Oregon (12–4)	South Florida (13–1)	Arkansas (19–7)	Michigan (14–4)	Tennessee (16–7)	13.
14.	Arkansas	Maryland (2–1)	Maryland (3–1)	Maryland (3–1)	Maryland (5–1)	Maryland (5–1)	Mississippi State (6–2)	Mississippi State (8–2)	South Florida (10–1)	Ohio State (8–1)	South Florida (10–1)	South Florida (10–1)	Indiana (13–4)	Oregon (13–6)	Tennessee (15–6)	Tennessee (16–7)	Gonzaga (23–3)	14.
15.	Iowa State	Northwestern (0–0)	Indiana (2–1)т	Indiana (2–1)	Northwestern (3–0)	Northwestern (4–0)	Michigan (7–0)	Ohio State (6–0)	Arkansas (11–4)	Kentucky (11–4)	Kentucky (13–4)	Indiana (11–4)	Ohio State (12–3)	Ohio State (13–4)	South Florida (14–2)	Arkansas (19–8)	Arkansas (19–8)	15.
16.	Indiana	Arkansas (3–1)	Oregon State (3–0)т	Northwestern (1–0)	Ohio State (4–0)	Michigan (5–0)	Ohio State (4–0)	South Florida (9–1)	Indiana (8–3)	Indiana (9–3)	Arkansas (13–6)	Tennessee (12–3)	Gonzaga (18–2)	Arkansas (17–7)	Georgia (18–5)	Gonzaga (21–3)	Michigan (14–5)	16.
17.	Northwestern	Oregon State (1–0)	Northwestern (0–0)	Ohio State (4–0)	Michigan (5–0)	Ohio State (4–0)	Texas (8–1)	Arkansas (10–4)	Ohio State (7–1)	DePaul (9–3)	Indiana (10–4)	Gonzaga (16–2)	Kentucky (14–5)	Georgia (17–4)	Kentucky (16–7)	West Virginia (19–4)	West Virginia (21–6)	17.
18.	Oregon State	Gonzaga (0–1)	Ohio State (3–0)	Syracuse (4–0)	DePaul (4–2)	DePaul (5–2)	South Florida (7–1)	Indiana (7–3)	DePaul (8–3)	Gonzaga (13–2)	Tennessee (12–3)	Arkansas (14–7)	Arkansas (15–7)	West Virginia (17–3)	Gonzaga (21–3)	Kentucky (17–8)	Kentucky (17–8)	18.
19.	DePaul	Ohio State (1–0)	Michigan (3–0)	Michigan (5–0)	Indiana (3–2)	Texas (6–1)	Indiana (5–2)	DePaul (6–3)	Mississippi State (8–4)	Arkansas (11–5)	Gonzaga (15–2)	West Virginia (15–2)	DePaul (11–4)т	Kentucky (15–6)	Oregon (13–7)	Rutgers (14–3)	South Florida (18–3)	19.
20.	Ohio State	DePaul (0–1)	Syracuse (3–0)	Missouri State (3–1)	Texas (5–1)т	Indiana (4–2)	DePaul (5–3)	Gonzaga (10–2)	Gonzaga (12–2)	Tennessee (10–3)	DePaul (9–4)	Kentucky (13–5)	West Virginia (16–3)т	Tennessee (13–6)	West Virginia (18–4)	South Florida (15–3)	Missouri State (21–2)	20.
21.	Gonzaga	Missouri State (2–1)	Missouri State (2–1)	Oregon State (3–2)	South Florida (4–1)т	South Florida (5–1)	Gonzaga (8–2)	Texas (8–2)	Northwestern (7–2)	Mississippi State (8–4)	West Virginia (13–2)	Northwestern (11–3)	Tennessee (12–5)	Gonzaga (19–3)	South Dakota State (21–2)	Missouri State (20–2)	Rutgers (14–4)	21.
22.	Notre Dame	Syracuse (1–0)	South Dakota State (3–0)	Texas (4–1)	Syracuse (5–1)	Syracuse (5–1)	Northwestern (4–2)	Northwestern (6–2)	Georgia (12–1)	Georgia (12–2)	Northwestern (9–3)	DePaul (10–4)	Georgia (16–4)	South Dakota State (19–2)	Ohio State (13–6)	Ohio State (13–7)	Ohio State (13–7)	22.
23.	Syracuse	Iowa State (1–1)	Texas (3–1)	South Florida (3–1)	Gonzaga (4–2)	Gonzaga (5–2)	Michigan State (8–0)	Tennessee (8–1)	Syracuse (6–1)	Northwestern (8–3)	South Dakota State (13–2)	South Dakota State (15–2)	South Dakota State (17–2)	Missouri State (15–2)	Missouri State (18–2)	Oregon (13–8)	Oregon (13–8)	23.
24.	Missouri State	Michigan (2–0)	DePaul (1–2)	DePaul (2–2)	Missouri State (4–2)	Missouri State (4–2)	Syracuse (5–1)	Syracuse (5–1)	Iowa State (9–4)	West Virginia (11–2)	Mississippi State (8–5)	Georgia (14–4)	Northwestern (11–4)	DePaul (13–5)	Rutgers (12–3)	Florida Gulf Coast (23–2)	Florida Gulf Coast (26–2)	24.
25.	Michigan	Texas (2–0)	Gonzaga (1–2)	Gonzaga (3–2)	Michigan State (6–0)	Michigan State (7–0)	Missouri State (4–2)	Washington State (7–1)	Tennessee (9–2)	South Dakota State (13–2)	Georgia (13–4)	Missouri State (11–2)	Missouri State (13–2)	Rutgers (10–3)	DePaul (14–6)	South Dakota State (21–3)	South Dakota State (21–3)	25.
	Preseason Nov 10	Week 2 Nov 30	Week 3 Dec 7	Week 4 Dec 14	Week 5 Dec 21	Week 6 Dec 28	Week 7 Jan 4	Week 8 Jan 11	Week 9 Jan 18	Week 10 Jan 25	Week 11 Feb 1	Week 12 Feb 8	Week 13 Feb 15	Week 14 Feb 22	Week 15 Mar 1	Week 16 Mar 8	Final Mar 15	
		Dropped: No. 22 Notre Dame	Dropped: No. 23 Iowa State	Dropped: No. 22 South Dakota State	Dropped: No. 21 Oregon State	Dropped: None	Dropped: None	Dropped: No. 23 Michigan State; No. 25 Missouri State	Dropped: No. 21 Texas; No. 25 Washington State	Dropped: No. 23 Syracuse; No. 24 Iowa State	Dropped: None	Dropped: No. 24 Mississippi State	Dropped: None	Dropped: No. 24 Northwestern	Dropped: None	Dropped: No. 25 DePaul	Dropped: None	

== USA Today Coaches Poll ==
The Coaches Poll is the second oldest poll still in use after the AP Poll. It is compiled by a rotating group of 31 college Division I head coaches. The Poll operates by Borda count. Each voting member ranks teams from 1 to 25. Each team then receives points for their ranking in reverse order: Number 1 earns 25 points, number 2 earns 24 points, and so forth. The points are then combined and the team with the highest points is then ranked No. 1; second highest is ranked No. 2 and so forth. Only the top 25 teams with points are ranked, with teams receiving first place votes noted the quantity next to their name. The maximum points a single team can earn is 775.

	Preseason Nov 19	Week 2 Dec 8	Week 3 Dec 15	Week 4 Dec 22	Week 5 Dec 29	Week 6 Jan 5	Week 7 Jan 12	Week 8 Jan 19	Week 9 Jan 26	Week 10 Feb 2	Week 11 Feb 9	Week 12 Feb 16	Week 13 Feb 23	Week 14 Mar 2	Week 15 Mar 9	Week 16 Mar 15	Final Apr 5	
1.	South Carolina (31)	Stanford (22) (3–0)	Stanford (25) (4–0)	Stanford (30) (7–0)	Stanford (29) (7–0)	Stanford (31) (9–0)	Stanford (31) (10–0)	Louisville (30) (12–0)	Louisville (30) (14–0)	South Carolina (20) (14–1)	UConn (17) (14–1)	UConn (16–1) (22)	UConn (18–1) (30)	UConn (29) (21–1)	UConn (27) (24–1)	UConn (24–1) (27)	Stanford (32) (31–2)	1.
2.	Stanford (1)	Louisville (6) (4–0)	Louisville (6) (5–0)	Louisville (1) (5–0)	Louisville (1) (5–0)	Louisville (1) (7–0)	Louisville (1) (10–0)	NC State (1) (10–0)	NC State (2) (11–0)	NC State (7) (12–1)	Louisville (11) (18–1)	Louisville (19–1) (8)	Stanford (21–2)	Texas A&M (2) (22–1)	Stanford (4) (25–2)	Stanford (25–2) (5)	Arizona (21–6)	2.
3.	UConn	NC State (1) (4–0)	NC State (6–0)	NC State (8–0)	NC State (8–0)	NC State (10–0)	NC State (10–0)	South Carolina (10–1)	South Carolina (12–1)	Louisville (5) (16–1)	South Carolina (2) (15–2)	South Carolina (17–2)	Texas A&M (20–1) (2)	Stanford (22–2)	NC State (20–2)	NC State (20–2)	UConn (28–2)	3.
4.	Baylor	South Carolina (2) (4–1)	South Carolina (4–1)	South Carolina (5–1)	South Carolina (5–1)	South Carolina (7–1)	South Carolina (8–1)	Stanford (1) (11–1)	UConn (10–0)	UCLA (10–2)	Stanford (17–2)	Stanford (19–2)	NC State (15–2)	NC State (17–2)	Texas A&M (23–2)	Texas A&M (23–2)	South Carolina (26–5)	4.
5.	Louisville	UConn (0–0)	UConn (1–0)	UConn (4–0)	UConn (5–0)	UConn (6–0)	UConn (7–0)	UConn (7–0)	UCLA (9–2)	UConn (11–1)	Texas A&M (2) (18–1)	Texas A&M (19–1)	Louisville (20–2)	Louisville (21–2)	South Carolina (22–4)	South Carolina (22–4)	Baylor (28–3)	5.
6.	NC State	Arizona (3–0)	Arizona (4–0)	Baylor (7–1)	Baylor (7–1)	Baylor (8–1)	Baylor (8–1)	UCLA (8–2)	Stanford (12–2)	Stanford (15–2)	NC State (12–2)	NC State (13–2)	South Carolina (18–3)	Baylor (20–2)	Baylor (22–2)	Baylor (25–2)	Louisville (26–4)	6.
7.	Mississippi State	Baylor (2–1)	Baylor (4–1)	Oregon (7–0)т	Oregon (7–0)	Texas A&M (10–0)	Texas A&M (12–0)	Maryland (11–1)	Texas A&M (14–1)	Texas A&M (16–1)	UCLA (11–3)	Arizona (14–2)	Baylor (17–2)	South Carolina (19–4)	Louisville (23–3)	Louisville (23–3)	NC State (22–3)	7.
8.	Arizona	Oregon (1) (4–0)	Oregon (1) (5–0)	Arizona (6–0)т	Arizona (7–0)	Kentucky (9–1)	UCLA (7–2)	Texas A&M (13–1)	Baylor (10–2)	Baylor (12–2)	Arizona (12–2)	Baylor (16–2)	Maryland (16–2)	Maryland (19–2)	Maryland (21–2)	Maryland (24–2)	Indiana (21–6)	8.
9.	Oregon	Kentucky (4–0)	Kentucky (6–0)	Texas A&M (8–0)	Texas A&M (9–0)	UCLA (6–2)	Maryland (9–1)	Baylor (8–2)	Arizona (11–2)	Arizona (11–2)	Baylor (14–2)	UCLA (12–3)	Arizona (15–3)	UCLA (14–4)	Indiana (18–4)	UCLA (16–5)	Maryland (26–3)	9.
10.	UCLA	Texas A&M (4–0)	Texas A&M (6–0)	Arkansas (9–1)	Arkansas (9–1)	Arizona (8–1)	Oregon (9–2)	Arizona (10–2)	Maryland (11–2)	Maryland (12–2)	Maryland (13–2)	Maryland (14–2)	UCLA (13–4)	Indiana (16–4)	UCLA (16–5)	Indiana (18–5)	Texas A&M (25–3)	10.
11.	Maryland	UCLA (2–1)	UCLA (4–1)	UCLA (5–2)	Kentucky (7–1)	Oregon (8–1)	Kentucky (9–3)	Michigan (10–0)	Ohio State (9–1)	Oregon (11–3)	Ohio State (12–2)	Michigan (11–1)	Indiana (14–4)	Arizona (15–4)	Arizona (16–5)	Arizona (16–5)	Michigan (16–6)	11.
12.	Kentucky	Mississippi State (2–1)	Arkansas (7–1)	Kentucky (7–1)	UCLA (5–2)	Maryland (7–1)	Michigan (9–0)	Kentucky (10–3)	Oregon (11–3)	Michigan (10–1)	Michigan (10–1)	Indiana (13–4)	Michigan (13–2)	Michigan (13–3)	Michigan (14–4)	Georgia (20–6)	UCLA (17–6)	12.
13.	Texas A&M	Arkansas (5–1)	Mississippi State (3–1)	Mississippi State (5–1)	Mississippi State (5–1)	Arkansas (10–2)	Arizona (8–2)	Oregon (9–3)	Michigan (10–1)	Ohio State (10–2)	Oregon (12–4)	Oregon (12–5)т	South Florida (13–1)	Arkansas (19–7)	Georgia (20–6)	Gonzaga (23–3)	Georgia (21–7)	13.
14.	Arkansas	Maryland (3–1)	Maryland (4–1)	Maryland (5–1)	Maryland (5–1)	Michigan (7–0)	Mississippi State (8–2)	South Florida (10–1)	Kentucky (11–4)	Kentucky (13–4)	Indiana (11–4)	Ohio State (12–3)т	Ohio State (13–4)	South Florida (14–2)	Gonzaga (22–3)	Michigan (14–5)	Missouri State (23–3)	14.
15.	Indiana	Indiana (2–1)	Indiana (2–1)	Ohio State (4–0)	Ohio State (4–0)	Mississippi State (6–2)	Ohio State (6–0)	Indiana (8–3)	Indiana (9–3)	Arkansas (13–6)	South Florida (10–1)	South Florida (11–1)	Oregon (13–6)	Gonzaga (21–3)	Tennessee (16–7)	Tennessee (16–7)	Oregon (15–9)	15.
16.	Northwestern	Oregon State (3–0)	Syracuse (4–0)	Northwestern (3–0)	Northwestern (4–0)	Ohio State (5–0)	Arkansas (10–4)	Ohio State (7–1)	South Florida (10–1)	South Florida (10–1)	Gonzaga (16–2)	Gonzaga (18–2)	Arkansas (17–7)	Tennessee (15–6)	Arkansas (19–8)	Arkansas (19–8)	Tennessee (17–8)	16.
17.	Oregon State	Northwestern (0–0)	Ohio State (4–0)	Michigan (5–0)	Michigan (5–0)	Texas (8–1)	South Florida (9–1)	Arkansas (11–5)	Gonzaga (13–2)	Indiana (10–4)	Arkansas (14–7)	Kentucky (15–5)	Kentucky (15–6)	Missouri State (18–2)	Missouri State (20–2)	Missouri State (21–2)	Texas (21–10)	17.
18.	Iowa State	Syracuse (3–0)	Northwestern (2–0)	Indiana (3–2)	Indiana (4–2)	Indiana (5–3)	Indiana (7–3)	Gonzaga (12–2)	Arkansas (11–6)	Gonzaga (15–2)	Kentucky (13–5)	Arkansas (15–7)	Georgia (17–4)	Oregon (13–7)	South Florida (15–3)	South Florida (18–3)	South Florida (19–4)	18.
19.	DePaul	Ohio State (3–0)	Michigan (5–0)	Texas (6–1)	Texas (6–1)	South Florida (7–1)	Gonzaga (10–2)	Mississippi State (8–4)	Mississippi State (8–4)	Tennessee (12–3)	Tennessee (12–3)	DePaul (12–4)	Missouri State (15–2)	Kentucky (16–7)	Kentucky (17–8)	Kentucky (17–8)	Iowa (20–10)	19.
20.	Gonzaga	Michigan (4–0)	Missouri State (4–1)	Syracuse (5–1)т	Syracuse (5–1)	Syracuse (5–1)	Texas (8–2)	Syracuse (6–1)	DePaul (9–3)	Northwestern (10–3)	Northwestern (11–3)	Missouri State (13–2)	Gonzaga (19–3)	Ohio State (13–6)	West Virginia (19–5)	West Virginia (21–6)	Gonzaga (23–4)	20.
21.	Syracuse	South Dakota State (3–0)	Oregon State (3–2)	DePaul (4–2)т	DePaul (5–2)	Gonzaga (9–2)	Syracuse (5–1)	DePaul (8–3)	Georgia (13–2)	DePaul (9–4)	West Virginia (15–2)	Tennessee (12–5)	Tennessee (13–6)	Georgia (18–5)	Florida Gulf Coast (23–2)	Florida Gulf Coast (26–2)	Kentucky (18–9)	21.
22.	Ohio State	Missouri State (3–1)	Texas (4–1)	South Florida (4–1)	South Florida (5–1)	DePaul (5–3)	DePaul (6–3)	Northwestern (7–2)	Tennessee (10–3)	Mississippi State (8–5)	DePaul (10–4)	Northwestern (11–4)	West Virginia (17–3)	South Dakota State (21–1)	Oregon (13–8)	Oregon (13–8)	Georgia Tech (17–9)	22.
23.	Notre Dame	DePaul (1–2)	DePaul (2–2)	Gonzaga (5–2)	Gonzaga (6–2)	Northwestern (4–2)	Northwestern (6–2)	Georgia (12–1)	Texas (11–3)	Missouri State (11–2)	Missouri State (11–2)	Georgia (16–4)	DePaul (13–5)	West Virginia (18–4)	Rutgers (14–3)	Rutgers (14–4)	Arkansas (19–9)	23.
24.	Michigan	Iowa State (2–2)	South Florida (3–1)	Missouri State (4–2)	Missouri State (4–2)	Michigan State (8–0)	Tennessee (8–1)	Texas (9–3)	Northwestern (8–3)	West Virginia (13–2)	Mississippi State (8–5)	West Virginia (16–3)	South Dakota State (19–2)	Florida Gulf Coast (21–2)	Ohio State (13–7)	Ohio State (13–7)	West Virginia (22–7)	24.
25.	Missouri State	Gonzaga (1–2)	Virginia Tech (6–0)т Gonzaga (3–2)т	South Dakota State (6–2)	South Dakota (7–2)	Missouri State (4–2)	Missouri State (4–2)	Missouri State (6–2)	Missouri State (8–2)	Georgia (13–4)	Georgia (14–4)	South Dakota State (17–2)	Northwestern (12–5)	Northwestern (13–6)	South Dakota State (21–3)	South Dakota State (21–3)	Florida Gulf Coast (26–3)	25.
	Preseason Nov 19	Week 2 Dec 8	Week 3 Dec 15	Week 4 Dec 22	Week 5 Dec 29	Week 6 Jan 5	Week 7 Jan 12	Week 8 Jan 19	Week 9 Jan 26	Week 10 Feb 2	Week 11 Feb 9	Week 12 Feb 16	Week 13 Feb 23	Week 14 Mar 2	Week 15 Mar 9	Week 16 Mar 15	Final Apr 5	
		Dropped: No. 23 Notre Dame	Dropped: No. 21 South Dakota State; No. 24 Iowa State	Dropped: No. 21 Oregon State; No. 25 Virginia Tech	Dropped: None	Dropped: No. 25 South Dakota State	Dropped: No. 24 Michigan State	Dropped: No. 24 Tennessee	Dropped: No. 20 Syracuse	Dropped: No. 23 Texas	Dropped: None	Dropped: No. 24 Mississippi State	Dropped: None	Dropped: No. 23 DePaul	Dropped: No. 25 Northwestern	Dropped: None	Dropped: No. 23 Rutgers; No. 24 Ohio State; No. 25 South Dakota State	

== See also ==
2020–21 NCAA Division I men's basketball rankings
