= Buecker =

Buecker may refer to:

- Bradley Buecker, American television and film director, producer
- Bücker (disambiguation)

== See also ==
- Paige Bueckers
