= Buker =

Buker is a surname. Notable people with the name include:

- Brian L. Buker (1949–1970), American soldier
- Cy Buker (1918–2011), American baseball player
- Henry Buker (1859–1899), American baseball player
- Ray Buker (1899–1992), American track and field athlete

== See also ==
- Büker, surname
- Bucher, surname
- Bucker (disambiguation), includes a list of people with surname Bucker
