= Büker =

Büker is a surname. Notable people with the surname include:

- Evren Büker (born 1985), Turkish basketball player
- Heinz Büker (born 1941), West German sprint canoer

== See also ==
- Buker, surname
- Bücker (disambiguation), includes a list of people with the surname Bücker
- Bucher, a surname
