= Saylor Poffenbarger =

American basketball player

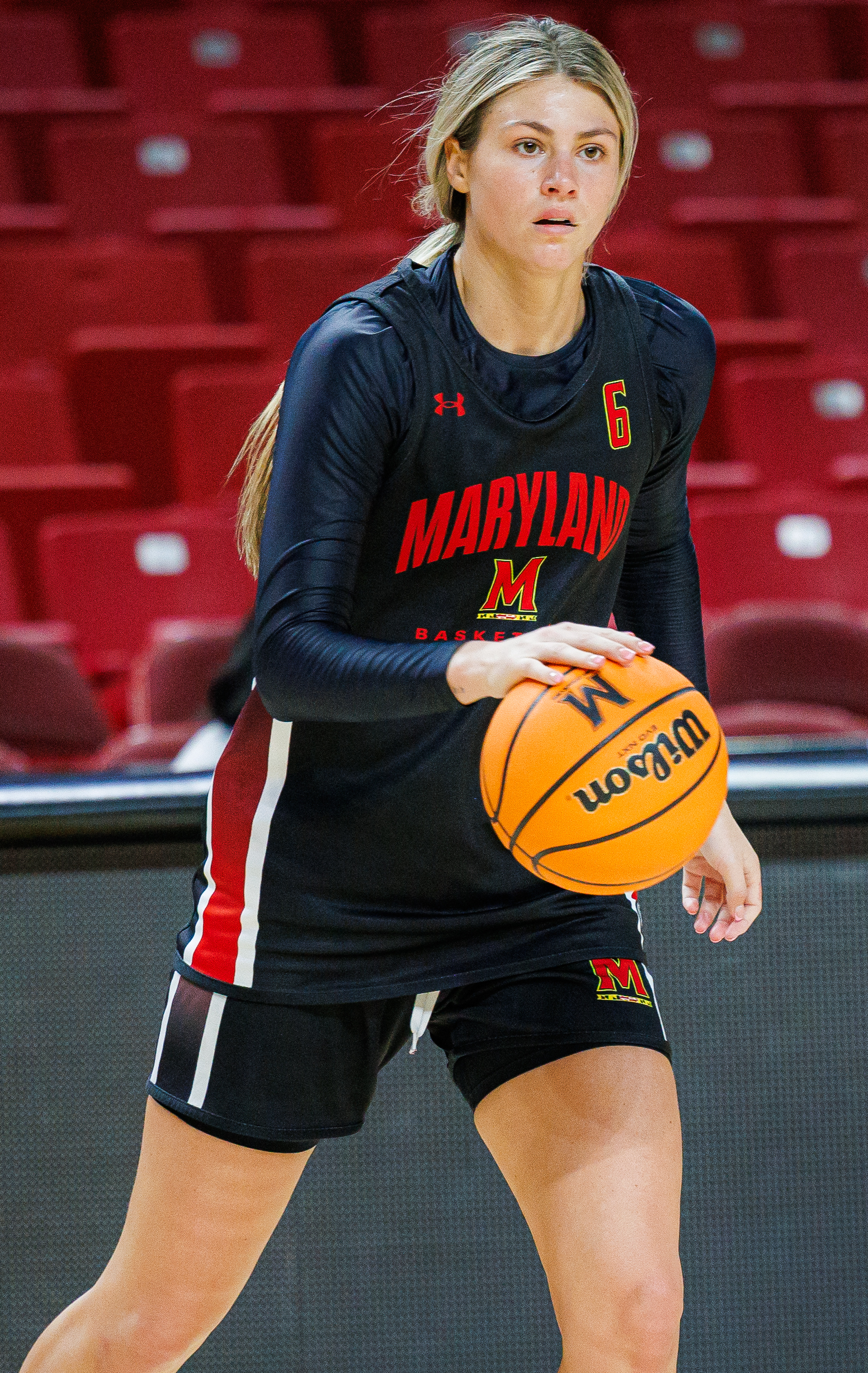
- Poffenbarger with Maryland in 2024

No. 6 – Phoenix Mercury
- Position: Shooting guard
- League: WNBA

Personal information
- Born: April 14, 2003 (age 23) Frederick, Maryland, U.S.
- Listed height: 6 ft 2 in (1.88 m)

Career information
- High school: Middletown (Middletown, Maryland)
- College: UConn (2020–2021); Arkansas (2022–2024); Maryland (2024–2026)
- WNBA draft: 2026: undrafted
- Playing career: 2026–present

Career history
- 2026: Chicago Sky
- 2026–present: Phoenix Mercury

Career highlights
- SEC All-Freshman Team (2023); Maryland Ms. Basketball (2020)
- Stats at WNBA.com
- Stats at Basketball Reference
Medals
Women's basketball
Representing the United States
FIBA Americas Under-16 Championship
Gold medal – first place	2019 Chile	Team

Saylor Poffenbarger (born April 14, 2003) is an American professional basketball player for the Phoenix Mercury of the Women's National Basketball Association (WNBA). She played college basketball for the UConn Huskies, Arkansas Razorbacks, and Maryland Terrapins.

== High school career ==
Poffenbarger attended Middletown High School in Middletown, Maryland. As a junior, she averaged 21.2 points, 12.7 rebounds, and 5.9 assists per game, being named Maryland Ms. Basketball at the end of the season. She committed to play college basketball at the University of Connecticut.

== College career ==
Poffenbarger enrolled early at UConn during the 2020–21 season. After playing sparingly as a freshman, appearing in 12 games, she entered the transfer portal.

In November 2021, Poffenbarger announced her commitment to the University of Arkansas to play for the Arkansas Razorbacks. Despite being ineligible to play her first year on campus, Poffenbarger participated in team activities such as scouting opponents. The following season, she received the honor of SEC Freshman of the Week multiple times, leading Arkansas to their best start in league play since the 2005–06 season. On November 30, 2023, Poffenbarger set a school record with 23 rebounds in a 71–58 victory over Florida State. She finished her redshirt sophomore season, averaging 10.2 points and 11.2 rebounds per game, before entering the transfer portal for a second time.

On April 22, 2024, Poffenbarger announced her commitment to the University of Maryland, College Park to play for the Maryland Terrapins.

Poffenbarger missed two games in her redshirt junior year due to a leg injury. She had a season-high 17 rebounds in a loss to USC on January 8, 2025.

== Professional career ==
=== Minnesota Lynx ===
After going undrafted in the 2026 WNBA draft, Poffenbarger signed a training camp contract with the Minnesota Lynx. In three preseason games with the Lynx, she averaged 5.7 points, 6.0 rebounds and 1.0 blocks per game. She was waived on May 6, 2026, prior to the start of the 2026 season.

=== Chicago Sky ===
On May 27, 2026, Poffenbarger signed a hardship contract with the Chicago Sky. She was waived on by the Chicago Sky on June 23, 2026.

=== Phoenix Mercury ===
On August 25, 2026, Poffenbarger signed a seven-day contact with the Phoenix Mercury.

== National team career ==
Poffenbarger played for the United States national under-16 team at the 2019 FIBA Under-16 Americas Championship in Chile. She averaged 7.2 points, 4.3 rebounds and 3.7 assists per game, helping her team win the gold medal.

== Career statistics ==
=== College ===
Year	Team	GP	GS	MPG	FG%	3P%	FT%	RPG	APG	SPG	BPG	TO	PPG
2020–21	UConn	12	0	2.7	.133	.091	1.000	0.3	0.0	0.0	0.1	0.0	0.5
2021–22	Arkansas	Did not play											
2022–23	Arkansas	37	37	32.2	.331	.229	.705	6.9	2.4	0.5	1.1	2.1	8.5
2023–24	Arkansas	30	30	31.6	.355	.329	.673	11.2	1.6	1.4	1.1	1.8	10.2
2024–25	Maryland	30	17	26.3	.383	.299	.862	7.2	1.9	1.0	0.7	2.2	9.1
2025–26	Maryland	31	31	29.9	.385	.309	.740	7.2	3.2	1.9	0.6	2.1	9.5
Career		140	115	27.8	.358	.288	.743	7.4	2.1	1.1	0.8	1.9	8.5
Statistics retrieved from Sports-Reference.

== Personal life ==
Poffenbarger's mother played professional basketball, and her brother, Reese, plays for the Akron Zips football team. She attributes her inspiration to the deaths of her younger brother Fordham and best friend Ella Bresee.
