= Bucher =

Bucher, or Bücher, is a surname. Notable people with the surname include:

- Alberte Pullman (née Bucher) (1920–2011), French theoretical and quantum chemist
- Alf Bucher (1874–1939), Scottish rugby player
- André Bucher (born 1976), Swiss athlete
- Ewald Bucher (1914–1991), German politician
- Gabriela Bucher, Colombian international development and social justice advocate
- John Conrad Bucher (1792–1851), American politician
- John N. Bucher (1871–1932), shopkeeper killed in a robbery by associates of Clyde Barrow
- Josef Bucher (born 1965), Austrian politician
- Lloyd M. Bucher (1927–2004), commander of the USS Pueblo captured by North Korea
- Lothar Bucher (1817–1892), German publicist
- Marie Kachel Bucher (1909–2008), American school teacher and Seventh Day Baptist
- Ric Bucher (born 1961), American sports reporter
- Roy Bucher (1895–1980), British general and commander-in-chief of the Indian Army
- Stefan G. Bucher (born 1973), American writer, graphic designer and illustrator
- Urs Bucher (born 1953), Swiss wheelchair curler
- Walter Hermann Bucher (1888–1965), German-American geologist and paleontologist
- Walter Bucher (cyclist) (1926–2025), Swiss cyclist

== See also ==
- Karl Bücher (1847–1930), German economist
- Buker, surname
