= 2021 Big East women's basketball tournament =

- Classification: Division I
- Season: 2020–21
- Teams: 11
- Site: Mohegan Sun Arena; Uncasville, CT
- Champions: UConn (19th title)
- Winning coach: Geno Auriemma (19th title)
- MVP: Paige Bueckers (UConn)
- Television: FS1, FS2, BEDN

2020–21 Big East Conference women's basketball standings
	Conf.				Overall
Team	W		L	PCT	W		L	PCT
No. 1 UConn†	18	–	0	1.000	28	–	2	.933
Marquette	14	–	4	.778	19	–	7	.731
Seton Hall	12	–	5	.706	14	–	7	.667
DePaul	11	–	5	.688	14	–	10	.583
Villanova	9	–	5	.643	17	–	7	.708
Creighton	6	–	7	.462	10	–	12	.455
Providence	4	–	10	.286	7	–	14	.333
St. John's	4	–	12	.250	8	–	15	.348
Xavier	2	–	8	.200	5	–	10	.333
Butler	3	–	15	.167	3	–	17	.150
Georgetown	2	–	14	.125	2	–	15	.118
† Big East tournament winner As of April 3, 2021; Rankings from AP poll

The 2021 Big East women's basketball tournament took place March 5 to 8, 2021, at Mohegan Sun Arena in Uncasville, Connecticut. UConn won their 19th title, receiving the conference's automatic bid to the 2021 NCAA tournament.

== Seeds ==
2021 Big East women's basketball tournament seeds and results
Seed	School	Conf.	Over.
1	‡ † – UConn	18–0	21–1
2	† – Marquette	14–4	17–5
3	† – Seton Hall	12–5	14–6
4	† – DePaul	11–5	14–7
5	† – Villanova	9–5	14–5
6	Creighton	6–7	7–10
7	Providence	4–10	6–13
8	St. John's	4–12	7–15
9	Xavier	2–8	5–9
10	Butler	3–15	3–16
11	Georgetown	2–14	2–14
‡ – Big East regular season champions, and tournament No. 1 seed. † – Received a single-bye in the conference tournament. Overall records include all games played in the Big East tournament.

== Schedule ==
Game	Time	Matchup	Television	Attendance
First round – Friday, March 5
1	11:00 AM	No. 9 Xavier 57 vs. No. 8 St. John's 65	BEDN	
2	2:00 PM	No. 10 Butler 61 vs. No. 7 Providence 63	BEDN	
3	5:00 PM	No. 11 Georgetown 42 vs. No. 6 Creighton 56	BEDN	
Quarterfinals – Saturday, March 6
4	Noon	No. 1 UConn 77 vs. No. 8 St. John's 41	FS1	
5	3:00 PM	No. 4 DePaul 72 vs No. 5 Villanova 78*	FS2	
6	6:00 PM	No. 2 Marquette 68 vs. No. 7 Providence 43	FS2	
7	9:00 PM	No. 3 Seton Hall 76 vs. No. 6 Creighton 83	FS2	
Semifinals – Sunday, March 7
8	3:00 PM	No. 1 UConn 84 vs. No. 5 Villanova 39	FS1	
9	6:00 PM	No. 2 Marquette 64 vs. No. 6 Creighton 59	FS1	
Championship – Monday, March 8
10	8:00 PM	No. 1 UConn 73 vs. No. 2 Marquette 39	FS1	
Game times in ET. Rankings denote tournament seed.

== Bracket ==
First round March 5
8	St. John's	65
9	Xavier	57
6	Creighton	56
11	Georgetown	42
7	Providence	63
10	Butler	61

Quarterfinals; March 6
1	UConn	77
8	St. John's	41
4	DePaul	72
5	Villanova	78*
3	Seton Hall	76
6	Creighton	83
2	Marquette	68
7	Providence	43

Semifinals; March 7
1	UConn	84
5	Villanova	39
6	Creighton	59
2	Marquette	64

Championship; March 8
1	UConn	73
2	Marquette	39

* denotes overtime period

== See also ==
- 2021 Big East men's basketball tournament
