= 2020–21 DePaul Blue Demons women's basketball team =

Intercollegiate basketball season

2020–21 DePaul Blue Demons women's basketball
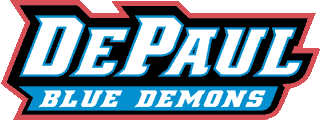

WNIT, first round
- Conference: Big East Conference
- Record: 14–10 (11–5 Big East)
- Head coach: Doug Bruno (35th season)
- Assistant coaches: Jill M. Pizzotti; Lisa Ryckbosch; Candis Blankson
- Home arena: Wintrust Arena

2020–21 Big East Conference women's basketball standings
	Conf.				Overall
Team	W		L	PCT	W		L	PCT
No. 1 UConn†	18	–	0	1.000	28	–	2	.933
Marquette	14	–	4	.778	19	–	7	.731
Seton Hall	12	–	5	.706	14	–	7	.667
DePaul	11	–	5	.688	14	–	10	.583
Villanova	9	–	5	.643	17	–	7	.708
Creighton	6	–	7	.462	10	–	12	.455
Providence	4	–	10	.286	7	–	14	.333
St. John's	4	–	12	.250	8	–	15	.348
Xavier	2	–	8	.200	5	–	10	.333
Butler	3	–	15	.167	3	–	17	.150
Georgetown	2	–	14	.125	2	–	15	.118
† Big East tournament winner As of April 3, 2021; Rankings from AP poll

The 2020–21 DePaul Blue Demons women's basketball team represented DePaul University during the 2020–21 NCAA Division I women's basketball season. The Blue Demons were led by thirty-fifth year head coach Doug Bruno and played their home games at the Wintrust Arena as members of the Big East Conference.

They finished the season 14–10, 11–5 in Big East play to finish in fourth place. As the fourth seed in the Big East tournament they lost in the Quarterfinals to Villanova. The received an at-large invitation to the WNIT, where they played in the Rockford Regional. They lost in the First Round to Saint Louis and lost their consolation game to Drake.

== Previous season ==
They finished the season 28–5, 15–3 in Big East play to finish in first place. DePaul won the Big East Conference tournament championship game over Marquette, 88–74. The NCAA tournament was cancelled due to the COVID-19 outbreak.

== Roster ==
2020–21 DePaul Blue Demons women's basketball team
Players
Coaches

Pos.	#	Name	Height	Year	Previous school	Hometown
G	1	Keke Rimmer	5 ft 10 in (1.78 m)	So	Proviso East	Maywood, IL
G	3	Deja Church	5 ft 10 in (1.78 m)	Jr	Southfield A&T; Michigan	Southfield, MI
G	10	Lexi Held	5 ft 10 in (1.78 m)	Jr	Cooper	Burlington, KY
G	11	Sonya Morris	5 ft 10 in (1.78 m)	Jr	Incarnate Word	St. Charles, MO
F	14	Hannah Purcell	6 ft 0 in (1.83 m)	So	Annandale	Annandale, MN
G	15	Jolene Daninger	5 ft 7 in (1.7 m)	Jr	Andover	Andover, MN
G	21	Darrione Rogers	5 ft 11 in (1.8 m)	Fr	Lake Park West	Roselle, IL
F	22	Jorie Allen	6 ft 1 in (1.85 m)	So	North Lawerence; Indiana	Bedford, IN
G	23	Dee Bekelja	5 ft 8 in (1.73 m)	Sr	Solon	Solon, OH
F	24	Kayla Caudle	6 ft 1 in (1.85 m)	So	Vernon Hills	Vernon Hills, IL
F	32	Nadège Jean	6 ft 2 in (1.88 m)	So	Rich South	Richton Park, IL
F	33	Courtney Fredrickson	6 ft 2 in (1.88 m)	Sr	Minnetonka; Wisconsin	Minnetonka, MN
G	35	Kendall Holmes	5 ft 11 in (1.8 m)	Fr	Benet Academy	Plainfield, IL
F	42	Kiara Dallmann	6 ft 2 in (1.88 m)	Sr	Sheboygan North; Iowa Western	Sheboygan, WI

Head coach

- Doug Bruno (DePaul)

Assistant coach(es)

- Jill M. Pizzotti (Southeast Missouri State)
- Candis Blankson (DePaul)
- Lisa Ryckbosch (Georgetown)

Legend

- (C) Team captain
- (S) Suspended
- (I) Ineligible
- (W) Walk-on
- Injured
- Current redshirt

Roster
Last update: July 8, 2021

== Schedule ==
Date time, TV	Rank^{#}	Opponent^{#}	Result	Record	Site (attendance) city, state
Non-conference regular season
November 28, 2020*; 4:00 p.m.	No. 19	No. 13 Texas A&M	L 91–93	0–1	Wintrust Arena (0); Chicago, IL
November 30, 2020*; 2:00 p.m.	No. 20	Chicago State	W 128–66	1–1	Wintrust Arena (0); Chicago, IL
December 4, 2020*; 5:30 p.m., ESPN	No. 20	vs. No. 5 Louisville; Jimmy V Classic	L 75–116	1–2	Mohegan Sun Arena (0); Uncasville, CT
December 9, 2020*; Noon	No. 24	at Kent State	Canceled		MAC Center; Kent, OH
December 13, 2020*; 3:00 p.m.	No. 24	Loyola-Chicago	W 76–67	2–2	Wintrust Arena (0); Chicago, IL
December 16, 2020*; 2:00 p.m.	No. 24	Kentucky	W 86–82	3–2	Wintrust Arena (0); Chicago, IL
Big East regular season
December 19, 2020; 2:00 p.m., BEDN/FloSports	No. 24	Georgetown	W 72–54	4–2 (1–0)	Wintrust Arena (0); Chicago, IL
December 22, 2020; 8:00 p.m., FS1	No. 18	at Creighton	W 90–81	5–2 (2–0)	CHI Health Center Omaha (169); Omaha, NE
December 29, 2020; 5:30 p.m., SNY	No. 18	at No. 4 UConn	L 52–75	5–3 (2–1)	Gampel Pavilion (0); Storrs, CT
January 4, 2021; 2:00 p.m., BEDN	No. 20	Villanova	W 94–82	6–3 (3–1)	Wintrust Arena (0); Chicago, IL
January 13, 2021; 5:30 p.m., FS1	No. 19	St. John's	W 101–84	7–3 (4–1)	Wintrust Arena (0); Chicago, IL
January 16, 2021; 1:00 p.m., BEDN	No. 19	at Georgetown	W 78–54	8–3 (5–1)	McDonough Gymnasium (0); Washington, D.C.
January 21, 2021; 4:00 p.m., BEDN	No. 18	at Butler	W 80–66	9–3 (6–1)	Hinkle Fieldhouse (183); Indianapolis, IN
January 23, 2021; 4:00 p.m., BEDN	No. 18	Providence	Postponed		Wintrust Arena; Chicago, IL
January 25, 2021; 6:00 p.m., BEDN	No. 17	at Xavier	Postponed		Wintrust Arena; Chicago, IL
January 31, 2021; Noon, Fox	No. 17	No. 3 UConn	L 67–100	9–4 (6–2)	Wintrust Arena (0); Chicago, IL
February 4, 2021; Noon, BEDN	No. 20	at Seton Hall	Postponed		Walsh Gymnasium; South Orange, NJ
February 7, 2021; 11:00 a.m., FS1	No. 20	at Marquette	W 87–82	10–4 (7–2)	Al McGuire Center (0); Milwaukee, WI
February 10, 2021; 5:30 p.m., FS2	No. 22	at St. John's	W 81–73	11–4 (8–2)	Carnesecca Arena (0); New York, NY
February 12, 2021; 6:00 p.m., BEDN	No. 22	at Villanova	Postponed		Finneran Pavilion; Villanova, PA
February 15, 2021; 6:00 p.m., FS1	No. 19	Seton Hall	W 82–76	12–4 (9–2)	Wintrust Arena (0); Chicago, IL
February 17, 2021; 4:00 p.m., BEDN	No. 19	Xavier	W 83–75	13–4 (10–2)	Wintrust Arena (0); Chicago, IL
February 20, 2021; 1:00 p.m., FS1	No. 19	Creighton	L 72–83	13–5 (10–3)	Wintrust Arena (0); Chicago, IL
February 24, 2021; 4:00 p.m., BEDN	No. 24	Marquette	L 71–85	13–6 (10–4)	Wintrust Arena (0); Chicago, IL
February 27, 2021; Noon, BEDN	No. 24	at Providence	W 75–49	14–6 (11–4)	Alumni Hall (0); Providence, RI
March 1, 2021; 4:00 p.m., BEDN	No. 25	Butler	L 81–86	14–7 (11–5)	Wintrust Arena (0); Chicago, IL
Big East Women's Tournament
March 6, 2021; 2:00 p.m., FS2	(4) No. 25	(5) Villanova; Second Round	L 72–78 ^{OT}	14–8	Mohegan Sun Arena (0); Uncasville, CT
WNIT
March 19, 2021; 5:00 p.m., FloHoops		Saint Louis; First Round	L 72–74	14–9	UW Health Sports Factory (134); Rockford, IL
March 20, 2021; 2:00 p.m., FloHoops		Drake; Consolation Game	L 91–100	14–10	UW Health Sports Factory (93); Rockford, IL
*Non-conference game. ^{#}Rankings from AP Poll. (#) Tournament seedings in parentheses. All times are in Central Time.

== Rankings ==
+ Regular season polls	Poll	Pre- Season	Week 2	Week 3	Week 4	Week 5	Week 6	Week 7	Week 8	Week 9	Week 10	Week 11	Week 12	Week 13	Week 14	Week 15	Week 16	Final
AP	19	20	24	24	18	18	20	19	18	17	20	22	19т	24	25	RV	RV	
Coaches	19	23	23	20т	21	22	22	21	20	21	22	19	23	RV	RV	RV		

Legend
	Increase in ranking
	Decrease in ranking
	Not ranked previous week
(RV)	Received Votes

The Coaches Poll did not release a Week 2 poll and the AP Poll did not release a poll after the NCAA Tournament.

== See also ==
2020–21 DePaul Blue Demons men's basketball team
