= Bücker (disambiguation) =

Bücker Flugzeugbau was a German aircraft manufacturer.

Bücker may also refer to:

- André Bücker (born 1969), German theatre director
- Theo Bücker (born 1948), German football manager and former player

== See also ==
- Bucker (disambiguation)
- Buecker (disambiguation)
- Büker, surname
