= 2020–21 UConn Huskies women's basketball team =

Intercollegiate basketball season

2020–21 UConn Huskies women's basketball

Big East tournament champions Big East regular season champions

NCAA tournament, Final Four
- Conference: Big East Conference

Ranking
- Coaches: No. 3
- AP: No. 1
- Record: 28–2 (18–0 Big East)
- Head coach: Geno Auriemma (36th season)
- Associate head coach: Chris Dailey (36th season)
- Assistant coaches: Shea Ralph (13th season); Jamelle Elliott (1st season)
- Home arena: Harry A. Gampel Pavilion; XL Center

2020–21 Big East Conference women's basketball standings
	Conf.				Overall
Team	W		L	PCT	W		L	PCT
No. 1 UConn†	18	–	0	1.000	28	–	2	.933
Marquette	14	–	4	.778	19	–	7	.731
Seton Hall	12	–	5	.706	14	–	7	.667
DePaul	11	–	5	.688	14	–	10	.583
Villanova	9	–	5	.643	17	–	7	.708
Creighton	6	–	7	.462	10	–	12	.455
Providence	4	–	10	.286	7	–	14	.333
St. John's	4	–	12	.250	8	–	15	.348
Xavier	2	–	8	.200	5	–	10	.333
Butler	3	–	15	.167	3	–	17	.150
Georgetown	2	–	14	.125	2	–	15	.118
† Big East tournament winner As of April 3, 2021; Rankings from AP poll

The 2020–21 UConn Huskies women's basketball team represented the University of Connecticut (UConn) during the 2020–21 NCAA Division I women's basketball season. The Huskies, led by Hall of Fame head coach Geno Auriemma in his 36th season at UConn, split their home games between Harry A. Gampel Pavilion and the XL Center and were members of the Big East Conference, which they joined for women's basketball that season. UConn was previously a member of the original Big East Conference from 1979 through 2013, and one of the original women's basketball teams of that league in 1982.

UConn was ranked no. 3 in both the AP and Coaches pre-season polls. During the regular season, they had a record of 21–1, including 18–0 in the Big East to win the conference regular season championship. In February 2021, they defeated no. 1 ranked South Carolina; it was UConn freshman Paige Bueckers' third straight 30-point game. UConn won the Big East tournament, winning all three of their games by over 30 points. They were ranked no. 1 in both polls at that time. As a no. 1 seed in the NCAA tournament, they won their region with a victory over no. 5 ranked Baylor in the Elite Eight. UConn then lost to Arizona in the Final Four and finished their campaign with a record of 28–2. Bueckers, the team's leading scorer, won several awards at the end of the season, including the Naismith College Player of the Year.

== Offseason ==
=== Departures ===
Name	Number	Pos.	Height	Year	Hometown	Reason for departure
Megan Walker	3	F	6'1"	Junior	Chesterfield, VA	Declared for 2020 WNBA draft
Crystal Dangerfield	5	G	5'5"	Senior	Murfreesboro, TN	Graduated / 2020 WNBA draft
Molly Bent	10	G	5'9"	Senior	Centerville, MA	Graduated
Evelyn Adebayo	14	F	6'1"	RS Senior	London, England	Completed college eligibility (Note: Adebayo was a graduate transfer in the 2019–20 season, having graduated from Murray State.)
Kyla Irwin	25	F	6'2"	Senior	State College, PA	Graduated
Batouly Camara	32	F	6'2"	RS Senior	New York, NY	Graduated

=== Recruits ===
College recruiting
Name	Hometown	School	Height	Weight	Commit date
Paige Bueckers; PG	Eden Prairie, MN	Hopkins High School	5 ft 11 in (1.80 m)	N/A	
Paige Bueckers; PG	Recruit ratings: ESPN: (98)				
Aaliyah Edwards; W	Kingston, Ontario	Crestwood Secondary School	6 ft 2 in (1.88 m)	N/A	
Aaliyah Edwards; W	Recruit ratings: ESPN: (97)				
Mir McLean; W	Owings Mills, MD	Roland Park Country School	5 ft 11 in (1.80 m)	N/A	
Mir McLean; W	Recruit ratings: ESPN: (97)				
Piath Gabriel; F	Manchester, NH	N/A	6 ft 5 in (1.96 m)	N/A	
Piath Gabriel; F	Recruit ratings: ESPN: (90)				
Nika Mühl; PG	Zagreb, Croatia	N/A	5 ft 11 in (1.80 m)	N/A	
Nika Mühl; PG	Recruit ratings: ESPN: (90)				
Overall recruit ranking:
Note: In many cases, Scout, Rivals, 247Sports, On3, and ESPN may conflict in their listings of height and weight.; In these cases, the average was taken. ESPN grades are on a 100-point scale.; Sources: "2020 Player Commits". ESPN. Archived from the original on November 13, 2020.

=== Recruiting class of 2021 ===
College recruiting (2021)
Name	Hometown	School	Height	Weight	Commit date
Azzi Fudd; G	Arlington, VA	St. John's College High School	5 ft 11 in (1.80 m)	N/A	
Azzi Fudd; G	Recruit ratings: ESPN: (98)				
Caroline Ducharme; G	Milton, MA	Noble & Greenough School	6 ft 1 in (1.85 m)	N/A	
Caroline Ducharme; G	Recruit ratings: ESPN: (98)				
Amari DeBerry; F	Williamsburg, NY	Williamsville South High School	6 ft 5 in (1.96 m)	N/A	
Amari DeBerry; F	Recruit ratings: ESPN: (96)				
Saylor Poffenbarger; G	Middletown, MD	Middletown High School	6 ft 2 in (1.88 m)	N/A	
Saylor Poffenbarger; G	Recruit ratings: ESPN: (94)				
Overall recruit ranking:
Note: In many cases, Scout, Rivals, 247Sports, On3, and ESPN may conflict in their listings of height and weight.; In these cases, the average was taken. ESPN grades are on a 100-point scale.; Sources: "2021 Player Commits". ESPN. Archived from the original on April 8, 2021.

=== Recruiting class of 2022 ===
College recruiting (2022)
Name	Hometown	School	Height	Weight	Commit date
Isuneh Brady; P	San Diego, CA	Cathedral Catholic High School	6 ft 3 in (1.91 m)	N/A	
Isuneh Brady; P	Recruit ratings: ESPN: (98)				
Overall recruit ranking:
Note: In many cases, Scout, Rivals, 247Sports, On3, and ESPN may conflict in their listings of height and weight.; In these cases, the average was taken. ESPN grades are on a 100-point scale.; Sources: "2022 Player Commits". ESPN. Archived from the original on November 13, 2020.

== Roster ==
2020–21 UConn Huskies women's basketball team
Players
Coaches

Pos.	#	Name	Height	Year	Previous school	Hometown
G	2	Autumn Chassion (W)	5 ft 8 in (1.73 m)	Fr	Lafayette Christian Academy	Lafayette, LA
F	3	Aaliyah Edwards	6 ft 3 in (1.91 m)	Fr	Crestwood Preparatory College	Kingston, Ontario
G	4	Saylor Poffenbarger	6 ft 2 in (1.88 m)	Fr	Middletown	Middletown, MD
G	5	Paige Bueckers	5 ft 11 in (1.8 m)	Fr	Hopkins	Hopkins, MN
G	10	Nika Mühl	5 ft 10 in (1.78 m)	Fr	III. Gimnazija Zagreb	Zagreb, Croatia
F	11	Mir McLean	5 ft 11 in (1.8 m)	Fr	Roland Park Country	Baltimore, MD
G	13	Christyn Williams	5 ft 11 in (1.8 m)	Jr	Central Arkansas Christian	Little Rock, AR
F	20	Olivia Nelson-Ododa	6 ft 5 in (1.96 m)	Jr	Winder-Barrow	Winder, GA
G	22	Evina Westbrook	6 ft 0 in (1.83 m)	RS Jr	Tennessee	Salem, OR
G	24	Anna Makurat	6 ft 2 in (1.88 m)	So	Sport Championship School	Sierakowice, Poland
F	32	Piath Gabriel	6 ft 5 in (1.96 m)	Fr	Bradford Christian Academy	Manchester, NH
G	44	Aubrey Griffin	6 ft 1 in (1.85 m)	So	Ossining	Ossining, NY

Head coach

- Geno Auriemma (West Chester)

Assistant coach(es)

- Chris Dailey (Rutgers)
- Shea Ralph (Connecticut)
- Jamelle Elliott (Connecticut)

Legend

- (C) Team captain
- (S) Suspended
- (I) Ineligible
- (W) Walk-on
- Injured
- Current redshirt

Roster

- Saylor Poffenbarger was only on the roster for the spring semester, joining the team in January.

== Schedule ==
Date time, TV	Rank^{#}	Opponent^{#}	Result	Record	High points	High rebounds	High assists	Site (attendance) city, state
Regular season
November 28, 2020*; 12:30 pm, SNY	No. 3	vs. Quinnipac; Basketball Hall of Fame Women's Challenge semifinals	Cancelled due to the COVID-19 pandemic					Mohegan Sun Arena; Uncasville, CT
November 29, 2020*; ESPN	No. 3	vs. Maine or No. 6 Mississippi State; Basketball Hall of Fame Women's Challenge	Cancelled due to the COVID-19 pandemic					Mohegan Sun Arena; Uncasville, CT
December 4, 2020*; 7:00 pm, ESPN	No. 3	vs. No. 5 Louisville	Cancelled due to the COVID-19 pandemic					Mohegan Sun Arena; Uncasville, CT
December 12, 2020*; 1:00 pm, SNY	No. 3	UMass Lowell	W 79–23	1–0	17 – Bueckers	9 – Tied	5 – Tied	Gampel Pavilion; Storrs, CT
December 15, 2020; 6:30 pm, SNY	No. 3	at Seton Hall	W 92–65	2–0 (1–0)	25 – Bueckers	10 – Nelson-Ododa	7 – Tied	Walsh Gymnasium; South Orange, NJ
December 17, 2020; 6:30 pm, SNY	No. 3	Creighton	W 80–47	3–0 (2–0)	24 – Nelson-Ododa	8 – Tied	5 – Bueckers	Gampel Pavilion; Storrs, CT
December 19, 2020; 1:00 pm, SNY	No. 3	Xavier	W 106–59	4–0 (3–0)	24 – Williams	11 – Nelson-Ododa	9 – Bueckers	Gampel Pavilion; Storrs, CT
December 22, 2020; 7:00 pm, SNY	No. 3	at Villanova	W 90–52	5–0 (4–0)	19 – Tied	9 – Makurat	7 – Williams	Finneran Pavilion; Villanova, PA
December 29, 2020; 6:30 pm, SNY	No. 4	No. 18 DePaul	W 75–52	6–0 (5–0)	18 – Bueckers	14 – Nelson-Ododa	5 – Williams	Gampel Pavilion; Storrs, CT
January 7, 2021*; 8:30 pm, ESPN	No. 3	at No. 6 Baylor	Cancelled due to the COVID-19 pandemic					Ferrell Center; Waco, TX
January 9, 2021; 1:00 pm, SNY	No. 3	Providence	W 87–50	7–0 (6–0)	23 – Bueckers	9 – Griffin	5 – Bueckers	Gampel Pavilion; Storrs, CT
January 16, 2021; 1:00 pm, SNY	No. 4	Villanova	Cancelled due to the COVID-19 pandemic					Gampel Pavilion; Storrs, CT
January 19, 2021; 6:30 pm, SNY	No. 3	Butler	W 103–35	8–0 (7–0)	18 – Nelson-Ododa	10 – Griffin	8 – Bueckers	Gampel Pavilion; Storrs, CT
January 21, 2021*; 7:00 pm, ESPN	No. 3	at No. 25 Tennessee; Rivalry	W 67–61	9–0	20 – Williams	11 – Nelson-Ododa	7 – Bueckers	Thompson–Boling Arena (3,553); Knoxville, TN
January 23, 2021; 2:00 pm, SNY	No. 3	Georgetown	W 72–41	10–0 (8–0)	19 – Nelson-Ododa	9 – Nelson-Ododa	9 – Westbrook	Gampel Pavilion; Storrs, CT
January 26, 2021	No. 3	at Providence	Cancelled due to the COVID-19 pandemic					Alumni Hall; Providence, RI
January 28, 2021*; 6:00 pm, ESPN2	No. 3	at No. 19 Arkansas	L 87–90	10–1	27 – Bueckers	6 – Tied	7 – Westbrook	Bud Walton Arena (4,400); Fayetteville, AR
January 31, 2021; 1:00 pm, FOX	No. 3	at No. 17 DePaul	W 100–67	11–1 (9–0)	29 – Williams	14 – Westbrook	10 – Bueckers	Wintrust Arena; Chicago, IL
February 3, 2021; 6:30 pm, SNY	No. 3	St. John's	W 94–62	12–1 (10–0)	32 – Bueckers	9 – Edwards	7 – Tied	Gampel Pavilion; Storrs, CT
February 5, 2021; 7:00 pm, SNY	No. 3	at Marquette	W 87–58	13–1 (11–0)	30 – Bueckers	8 – Nelson-Ododa	9 – Mühl	Al McGuire Center; Milwaukee, WI
February 8, 2021*; 7:00 pm, FS1	No. 2	No. 1 South Carolina	W 63–59 ^{OT}	14–1	31 – Bueckers	7 – Tied	6 – Nelson-Ododa	Gampel Pavilion; Storrs, CT
February 10, 2021; 6:30 pm, SNY	No. 2	Seton Hall	W 70–49	15–1 (12–0)	23 – Bueckers	13 – Nelson-Ododa	7 – Westbrook	Gampel Pavillon; Storrs, CT
February 12, 2021; 6:00 pm, CBSSN	No. 2	at Georgetown	W 64–40	16–1 (13–0)	19 – Tied	7 – Tied	9 – Bueckers	McDonough Gymnasium; Washington, D.C.
February 17, 2021; 6:00 pm, SNY	No. 1	at St. John's	W 77–32	17–1 (14–0)	21 – Williams	8 – Westbrook	9 – Bueckers	Carnesecca Arena; New York, NY
February 20, 2021; 3:00 pm, SNY	No. 1	at Xavier	W 83–32	18–1 (15–0)	22 – Williams	11 – Edwards	7 – Bueckers	Cintas Center (922); Cincinnati, OH
February 25, 2021; 5:00 pm, SNY	No. 1	at Creighton	W 81–49	19–1 (16–0)	19 – Mühl	11 – Nelson-Ododa	9 – Bueckers	D. J. Sokol Arena (278); Omaha, NE
February 27, 2021; 4:30 pm, SNY	No. 1	at Butler	W 97–68	20–1 (17–0)	24 – Edwards	14 – Edwards	14 – Bueckers	Hinkle Fieldhouse (1,721); Indianapolis, IN
March 1, 2021; 8:00 pm, CBSSN	No. 1	Marquette	W 63–53	21–1 (18–0)	19 – Nelson-Ododa	10 – Nelson-Ododa	3 – Tied	Gampel Pavilion; Storrs, CT
Big East Women's Tournament
March 6, 2021; 12:00 pm, FS1	(1) No. 1	vs. (8) St. John's; Quarterfinals	W 77–41	22–1	17 – Bueckers	11 – Nelson-Ododa	3 – Bueckers	Mohegan Sun Arena; Uncasville, CT
March 7, 2021; 3:00 pm, FS1	(1) No. 1	vs. (5) Villanova; Semifinals	W 84–39	23–1	26 – Williams	7 – Tied	8 – Bueckers	Mohegan Sun Arena; Uncasville, CT
March 8, 2021; 8:00 pm, FS1	(1) No. 1	vs. (2) Marquette; Championship	W 73–39	24–1	23 – Bueckers	8 – Edwards	5 – Nelson-Ododa	Mohegan Sun Arena; Uncasville, CT
NCAA tournament
March 21, 2021*; 8:00 pm, ESPN	(1 R) No. 1	vs. (16 R) High Point; First Round	W 102–59	25–1	24 – Bueckers	12 – Edwards	6 – Bueckers	Alamodome; San Antonio, TX
March 23, 2021*; 9:00 pm, ESPN	(1 R) No. 1	vs. (8 R) Syracuse; Second Round	W 83–47	26–1	20 – Bueckers	8 – Nelson-Ododa	4 – Tied	Alamodome; San Antonio, TX
March 27, 2021*; 1:00 pm, ABC	(1 R) No. 1	vs. (5 R) Iowa; Sweet Sixteen	W 92–72	27–1	27 – Williams	11 – Nelson-Ododa	10 – Westbrook	Alamodome; San Antonio, TX
March 29, 2021*; 7:00 pm, ESPN	(1 R) No. 1	vs. (2 R) No. 5 Baylor; Elite Eight	W 69–67	28–1	28 – Bueckers	8 – Nelson-Ododa	4 – Nelson-Ododa	Alamodome; San Antonio, TX
April 2, 2021*; 9:30 pm, ESPN	(1 R) No. 1	vs. (3 M) No. 11 Arizona; Final Four	L 59–69	28–2	20 – Williams	7 – Edwards	4 – Bueckers	Alamodome; San Antonio, TX
*Non-conference game. ^{#}Rankings from AP poll. (#) Tournament seedings in parentheses. R=River Walk M=Mercado. All times are in EST.

== Rankings ==
Regular season polls
Poll	Pre- Season	Week 2	Week 3	Week 4	Week 5	Week 6	Week 7	Week 8	Week 9	Week 10	Week 11	Week 12	Week 13	Week 14	Week 15	Week 16	Week 17	Final
AP	3	3	3 (2)	3 (1)	3 (1)	4 (1)	4 (1)	4	3 (1)	3 (1)	3	2	1 (26)	1 (28)	1 (27)	1 (22)	1 (23)	N/A
Coaches	3	3^	5	5	5	5	5	5	5	4	5	1 (17)	1 (22)	1 (30)	1 (29)	1 (27)	1 (27)	3

Legend
	Increase in ranking
	Decrease in ranking
	Not ranked previous week
RV	Received votes
NR	Not ranked
( )	Number of first place votes

^ Coaches did not release a Week 2 poll

== Player statistics ==
Player	Games played	Minutes	Field goals	Three pointers	Free throws	Rebounds	Assists	Blocks	Steals	Points
Paige Bueckers	29	1049	222	64	73	141	168	11	66	581
Christyn Williams	29	998	187	49	49	124	64	14	27	472
Evina Westbrook	30	920	104	40	35	158	128	20	52	283
Olivia Nelson-Ododa	30	783	152	4	52	234	87	53	19	360
Aaliyah Edwards	29	631	131	0	49	164	26	29	28	311
Nika Mühl	23	562	40	24	8	56	62	4	40	112
Aubrey Griffin	29	486	69	3	40	138	24	23	34	181
Anna Makurat	16	327	21	13	4	52	38	5	15	59
Mir McLean	24	167	26	1	15	51	11	6	6	68
Piath Gabriel	22	55	6	0	3	12	2	5	0	15
Saylor Poffenbarger	12	32	2	1	1	4	0	1	0	6
Autumn Chassion	8	15	3	2	0	2	3	0	0	8

== Awards and honors ==
- Paige Bueckers
  - Naismith Player of the Year
  - United States Basketball Writers Association Player of the Year
  - Associated Press Player of the Year
  - John R. Wooden Award
  - Nancy Lieberman Award
  - Associated Press first-team All-American
  - United States Basketball Writers Association first-team All-American
  - Women's Basketball Coaches Association All-American
  - United States Basketball Writers Association Co-Freshman of the Year
  - Women's Basketball Coaches Association Co-Freshman of the Year
  - Big East Player of the Year
  - First-team All-Big East
  - Big East Freshman of the Year
  - Big East All-Freshman Team
  - Big East tournament Most Outstanding Player
- Olivia Nelson-Ododa
  - Big East Co-Defensive Player of the Year
  - Second-team All-Big East
- Aaliyah Edwards
  - Big East Sixth Woman of the Year
  - Big East All-Freshman Team
- Christyn Williams
  - First-team All-Big East
- Geno Auriemma
  - Big East Coach of the Year

== See also ==
- 2020–21 UConn Huskies men's basketball team
