= Bucker =

Bucker may refer to:

- A logging worker who performs log bucking
- George Bucker or Adam Damlip (died c. 1540), English Protestant martyr
- Koen Bucker (born 1996), Dutch footballer

== See also ==
- Bücker (disambiguation)
