= Paige Bueckers =

American basketball player (born 2001)

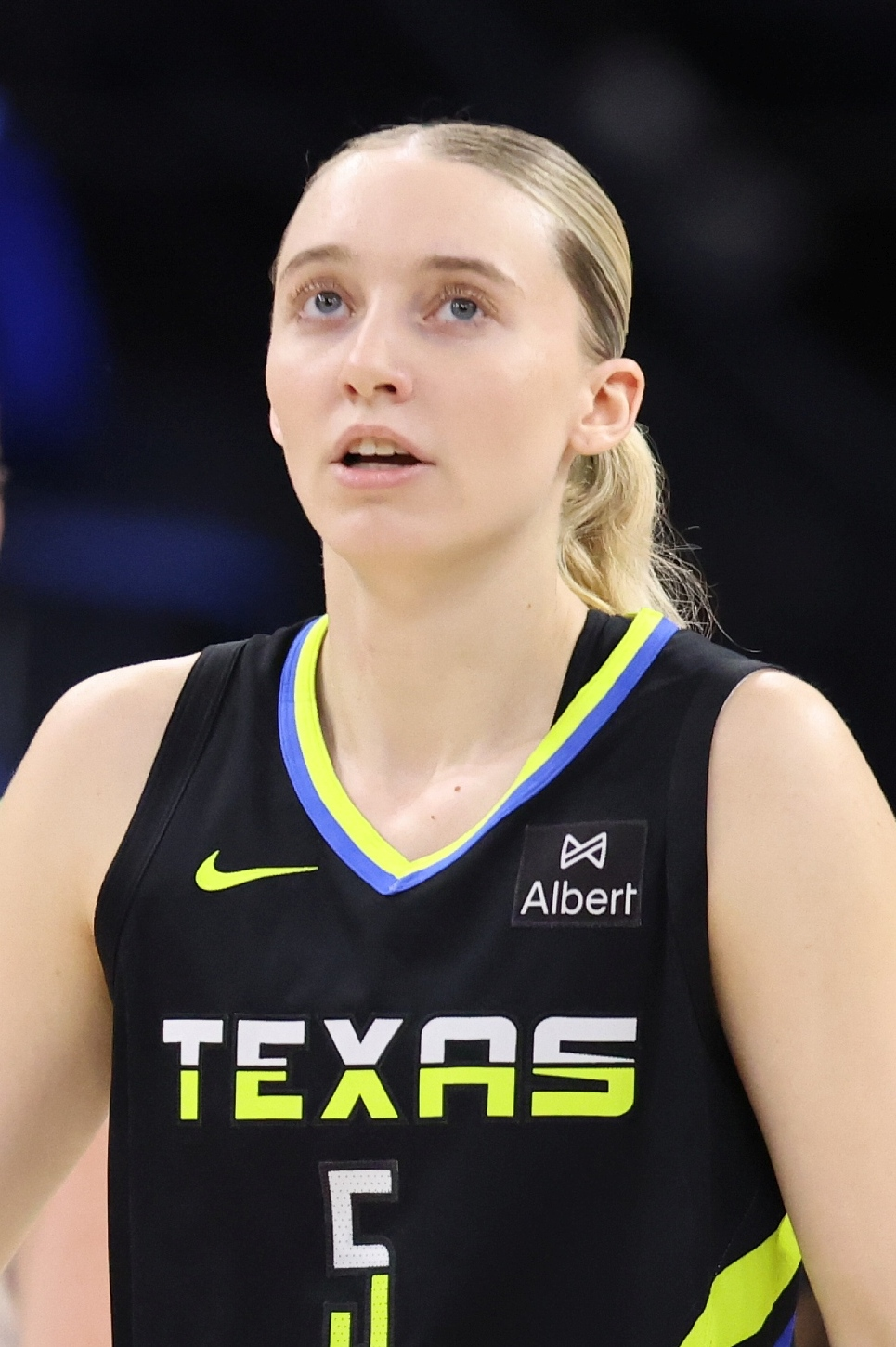
- Bueckers with the Dallas Wings in 2025

No. 5 – Dallas Wings
- Position: Point Guard
- League: WNBA

Personal information
- Born: October 20, 2001 (age 25) Edina, Minnesota, U.S.
- Listed height: 6 ft 0 in (1.83 m)
- Listed weight: 160 lb (73 kg)

Career information
- High school: Hopkins (Minnetonka, Minnesota)
- College: UConn (2020–2025)
- WNBA draft: 2025: 1st round, 1st overall pick
- Drafted by: Dallas Wings
- Playing career: 2025–present

Career history
- 2025–present: Dallas Wings
- 2026–present: Breeze

Career highlights
- WNBA Rookie of the Year (2025); 2× All-WNBA Second Team (2025, 2026); WNBA All-Rookie Team (2025); 2× WNBA All-Star (2025, 2026); First-team All-Unrivaled (2026); NCAA champion (2025); Honda Sports Award (2025); Wade Trophy (2025); AP Player of the Year (2021); Naismith College Player of the Year (2021); USBWA National Player of the Year (2021); John R. Wooden Award (2021); 3× Unanimous first-team All-American (2021, 2024, 2025); First-team Academic All-American (2024); Big East Scholar-Athlete of the Year (2024); 2× Nancy Lieberman Award (2021, 2025); USBWA National Co-Freshman of the Year (2021); WBCA Co-Freshman of the Year (2021); 3× Big East Player of the Year (2021, 2024, 2025); 3× First-team All-Big East (2021, 2024, 2025); Big East Freshman of the Year (2021); Big East All-Freshman Team (2021); 3× Big East tournament MOP (2021, 2024, 2025); Gatorade Female Athlete of the Year (2020); Gatorade National Player of the Year (2020); Morgan Wootten Player of the Year (2020); Naismith Prep Player of the Year (2020); McDonald's All-American (2020); MaxPreps National Player of the Year (2020); Minnesota Miss Basketball (2020); USA Basketball Female Athlete of the Year (2019); FIBA Under-19 World Cup MVP (2019)
- Stats at Basketball Reference
Medals
Representing the United States
Women's basketball
FIBA World Cup
Gold medal – first place	2026 Germany
FIBA Under-19 World Cup
Gold medal – first place	2019 Thailand	Team
FIBA Under-17 World Cup
Gold medal – first place	2018 Belarus	Team
FIBA Americas Under-16 Championship
Gold medal – first place	2017 Argentina	Team
Women's 3x3 basketball
Youth Olympic Games
Gold medal – first place	2018 Argentina	Team

Paige Madison Bueckers (/ˈbɛkərz/ BEK-ərz; born October 20, 2001) is an American professional basketball player for the Dallas Wings of the Women's National Basketball Association (WNBA) and for the Breeze of Unrivaled. She played college basketball for the UConn Huskies.

Nicknamed "Paige Buckets", Bueckers attended Hopkins High School in Minnetonka, Minnesota and was ranked as the number one recruit in her class by ESPN, receiving national high school player of the year honors. In her first season at UConn, Bueckers became the first freshman to be named national women's player of the year and helped her team reach the Final Four in 2021. She missed most of her sophomore season and her entire junior season with knee injuries but led UConn to the 2022 national title game. Bueckers helped the Huskies return to the Final Four as a redshirt junior, before winning her first national championship and receiving the Wade Trophy as a senior in 2025. She was a three-time unanimous first-team All-American in college and has the highest career scoring average in UConn history (19.9).

Selected first overall by the Dallas Wings in the 2025 WNBA draft, Bueckers made an immediate impact at the professional level, being named WNBA Rookie of the Year and selected to the All-WNBA Second Team in her first season. She made her Unrivaled debut with Breeze in 2026 and made the All-Unrivaled First Team.

Bueckers is a member of the United States national team. She won three gold medals at the youth international level, including at the 2019 FIBA Under-19 World Cup, where she was named Most Valuable Player. Bueckers was a Youth Olympic gold medalist in 3x3 basketball and has played for the senior national 3x3 team. She was recognized as USA Basketball Female Athlete of the Year in 2019. She most recently won a gold medal at the 2026 FIBA Women's Basketball World Cup in Germany.

== Early life and career ==
Bueckers was born on October 20, 2001, in Edina, Minnesota, and grew up in neighboring St. Louis Park. She started playing basketball at age five. As a child, she also played Little League Baseball as a catcher, as well as football and soccer, but focused on basketball by first grade. Bueckers became friends with National Basketball Association (NBA) player Jalen Suggs while in elementary school. Her father, Bob Bueckers, is a software developer, and was Bueckers' basketball coach until seventh grade. Bueckers drew inspiration from NBA players LeBron James and Kyrie Irving, and Women's National Basketball Association (WNBA) players Diana Taurasi and Sue Bird. She grew up supporting the Minnesota Lynx of the WNBA.

In seventh grade, Bueckers played for the tenth-grade and junior varsity basketball teams at Hopkins High School in Minnetonka. By that time, she was also playing year-round with North Tartan, an Amateur Athletic Union (AAU) program competing in the Nike Elite Youth Basketball League, a national circuit. Bueckers grew four inches in the year before her eighth-grade season. She joined Hopkins' varsity team in eighth grade under head coach Brian Cosgriff, averaging 8.9 points, 3.5 rebounds, 2.1 assists and 1.4 steals per game. She led her team in three-point shooting and ranked second in assists. Hopkins finished with a 28–3 record and a runner-up finish at the Class 4A state tournament, (Note: In girls' basketball, 4A is one of four classifications governed by the Minnesota State High School League. It includes the 64 largest schools by enrollment, as determined every two years, with schools allowed to appeal their classification.) where Bueckers was named to the All-Tournament Team.

== High school career ==
Bueckers made her freshman season debut for Hopkins High School on November 25, 2016, recording 28 points, five steals and four assists in a 74–34 win over Osseo Senior High School. That year, she assumed a more important role than in her eighth-grade season and became one of the team's leading scorers and passers. As a freshman, Bueckers averaged 20.8 points, 4.5 rebounds, 4.5 steals and 4.1 assists per game, earning All-Metro first team honors from the Star Tribune. She led Hopkins to a 31–1 record, its only loss coming against Elk River High School at the Class 4A state championship. Bueckers made the Class 4A All-Tournament Team.

In January 2018, as a sophomore, Bueckers was sidelined with an ankle injury that had been hurting her for the first two months of the season. She finished the season averaging 22.3 points, 6.8 assists and 5.9 rebounds per game. Bueckers helped Hopkins to a 28–4 record but suffered her third straight loss at the Class 4A state title game, despite leading all scorers with 37 points. She was named Star Tribune Metro Player of the Year, becoming the first sophomore to win the award since its creation 34 years earlier. Bueckers was also recognized as Minnesota Gatorade Player of the Year for athletic excellence, academic achievement and exemplary character.

As a junior on February 1, 2019, Bueckers scored a career-high 43 points in a 69–66 win over Wayzata High School and surpassed 2,000 career points. On March 16, despite having an illness that had caused her to vomit earlier in the day, she recorded 13 points, seven assists, five rebounds and five steals as her team won the Class 4A state championship, 74–45, over Stillwater Area High School. Hopkins finished the season with a 32–0 record. Bueckers averaged 24.4 points, 5.1 assists, 4.9 rebounds and 4.6 steals per game, repeating as Star Tribune Metro Player of the Year and Minnesota Gatorade Player of the Year. She was one of three finalists for the Gatorade National Player of the Year award. That year, Bueckers moved to the Minnesota Metro Stars AAU program, following her former North Tartan coach Tara Starks. In August 2019, she was named AAU Player of the Year by Prep Girls Hoops.

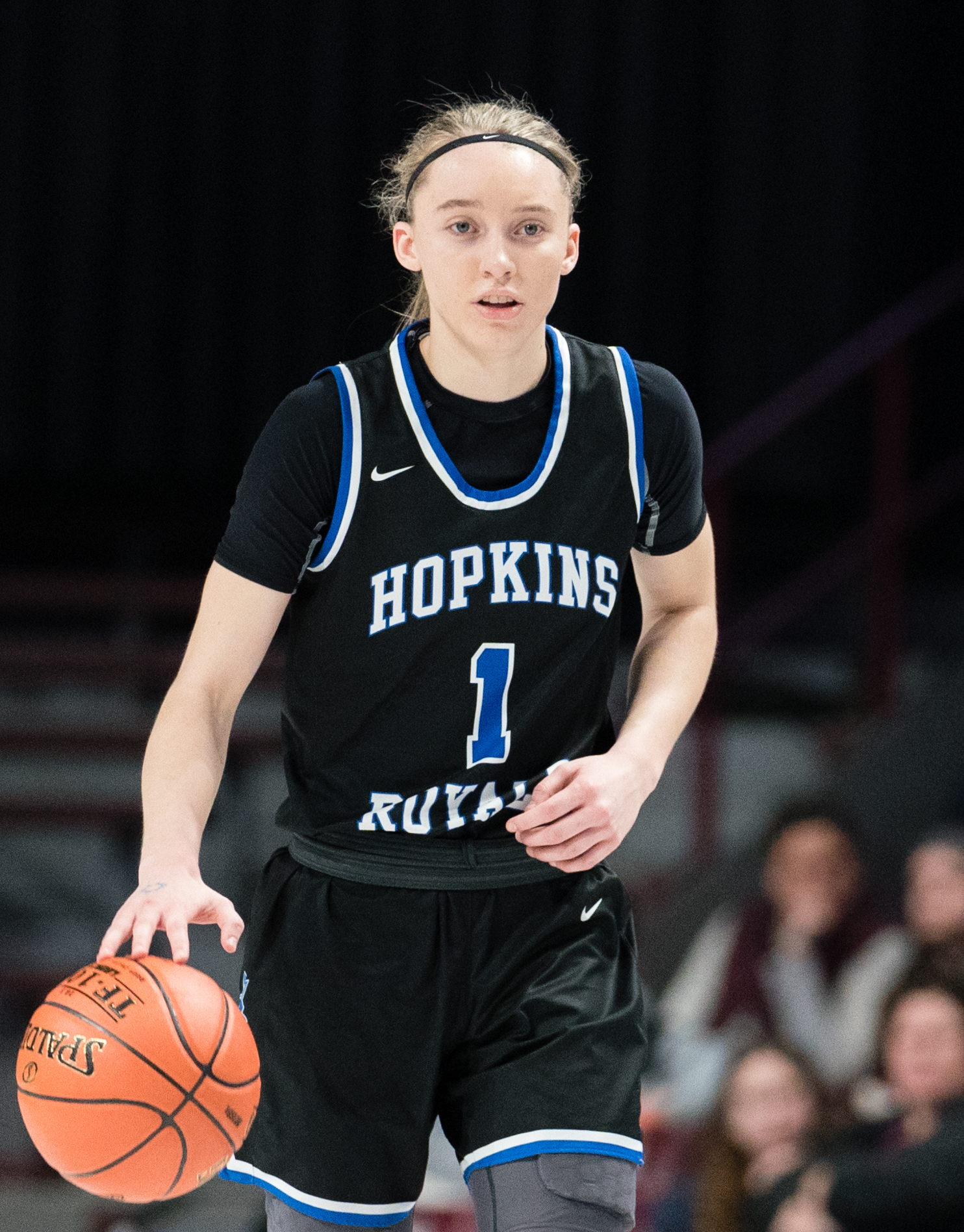
Bueckers with Hopkins High School in a state playoff game in 2020

On January 29, 2020, during her senior season, Bueckers became the first female high school player to be featured on the cover of basketball magazine Slam. Toward the end of the season, she suffered from a stress reaction in her right leg due to overuse. Bueckers sometimes wore a walking boot as a preventative measure, was limited in practice and missed the first game of the state tournament. She led Hopkins to the Class 4A state championship game, which was canceled on March 13 amid the COVID-19 pandemic. Bueckers was selected to play at the McDonald's All-American Game and the Jordan Brand Classic, two prestigious high school all-star games, but both were canceled due to the pandemic. She averaged 21.4 points, 9.4 assists, 5.4 steals and five rebounds per game, leading Hopkins to another undefeated season and 62 consecutive wins. Bueckers was again honored as Star Tribune Metro Player of the Year, becoming the award's first three-time winner. She was named Gatorade Female High School Athlete of the Year, Gatorade National Player of the Year, Naismith Prep Player of the Year, Morgan Wootten National Player of the Year, and Minnesota Miss Basketball. Bueckers finished as Hopkins' all-time leader in points (2,877), assists (795) and steals (574), with her assist total ranking tenth all time in Minnesota state history; she also recorded 18 assists in a single game, tied for the third-most in state history.

Bueckers has been regarded as one of the best players in Minnesota girls' high school basketball history. During her senior season, Star Tribune columnist Chip Scoggins compared her influence in the state to that of Lindsay Whalen, writing, "A generation of girls—now young women—throughout the Twin Cities and greater Minnesota grew up idolizing [Whalen] as a basketball star. Bueckers is having that same impact on a new generation of girls." In 2025, MaxPreps ranked Bueckers the 51st greatest high school athlete of the 21st century.

=== Recruiting ===
Bueckers was a five-star recruit and ranked the number one player in the 2020 class by ESPN. By eighth grade and age 14, she had received scholarship offers from NCAA Division I basketball programs at Minnesota, Iowa State and Illinois. On April 1, 2019, Bueckers announced her commitment to University of Connecticut. The other finalists she was considering were Notre Dame, Oregon State, Oregon, UCLA, Minnesota, South Carolina, Maryland, Texas and Duke. On November 13, Bueckers signed a National Letter of Intent with UConn. She became the 11th number-one recruit to sign and attend UConn since 1998. Bueckers was drawn to UConn because she felt that head coach Geno Auriemma would maximize her talents, and because of the university's reputation and enthusiasm for women's basketball. She also believed that she could immediately have a key role at UConn, with the expected graduation of point guard Crystal Dangerfield, and was attracted by its team-oriented play style.

== College career ==
=== Freshman season ===
Entering her freshman season at UConn, sports publications described Bueckers as the program's most hyped recruit since Breanna Stewart in 2012. Unlike Stewart and other former UConn stars, she became her team's leader from the beginning of her college career. Megan Walker, UConn's top scorer from the previous year, had opted to forgo her senior season to enter the 2020 WNBA draft, leaving the 2020–21 team with no seniors. Bueckers was unanimously selected as the Big East Preseason Freshman of the Year by the league's coaches.

"I think the most impressive thing about Paige is that she plays at the same pace the entire game. That usually comes a bit later for most players, but she's got it at such a young age. She makes the game slow down for her. I'm always surprised when she shoots and it doesn't go in."

— UConn head coach Geno Auriemma on Bueckers after her 31-point game in a win over No. 1 South Carolina on February 8, 2021

On December 12, 2020, Bueckers made her collegiate debut for UConn, recording 17 points, nine rebounds, five assists and five steals in a 79–23 win over UMass Lowell. On January 21, 2021, she made a three-pointer with 25 seconds left to help defeat rival Tennessee, 67–61, despite shooting 3-of-14 from the field for a season-low nine points. Late in the game, Bueckers sprained her ankle, causing her to miss the next contest against Georgetown. On February 3, she posted a season-high 32 points and seven assists in a 94–62 victory over St. John's of New York. It was the highest-scoring performance by a UConn freshman since Tina Charles in 2007. Two days later, she scored 30 points in an 87–58 win over Marquette. In her next game, Bueckers recorded 31 points, six steals and five assists, scoring her team's final 13 points, in a 63–59 overtime win over South Carolina, the number one team in the AP Poll. She became the first player in program history to have three straight 30-point games. On February 27, Bueckers posted 20 points, a program-record 14 assists and seven rebounds in a 97–68 victory over Butler. After leading UConn to the Big East regular-season title, she was named Big East Player of the Year and unanimous Big East Freshman of the Year, joining Maya Moore as the only players to win both awards in the same season. She was also a unanimous first-team All-Big East and Big East All-Freshman Team selection. On March 8, Bueckers recorded 23 points, six rebounds and four assists in a 73–39 win over Marquette at the Big East tournament title game. She was named the most outstanding player (MOP) of the tournament.

On March 21, Bueckers recorded 24 points, nine rebounds, six assists, and four steals in a 102–59 win over 16th-seeded High Point in the first round of the 2021 NCAA tournament. Her 24 points were the most by a UConn player in their tournament debut. Bueckers scored a game-high 28 points in a 69–67 win over second-seeded Baylor in the Elite Eight to help UConn reach its 13th straight Final Four. She was recognized as MOP of the River Walk Regional. At the Final Four, UConn was upset by third-seeded Arizona, 69–59, and finished the season with a 28–2 record. Bueckers was named to the Final Four All-Tournament Team. She won all the national player of the year awards she was eligible for—AP Player of the Year, Naismith College Player of the Year, USBWA Women's National Player of the Year and the John R. Wooden Award—becoming the first freshman to receive any of the awards. Bueckers was a unanimous first-team All-American, earning first-team All-American honors from the AP and the USBWA, and made the Women's Basketball Coaches Association (WBCA) Coaches' All-America Team. She was the first freshman to win the Nancy Lieberman Award as the top point guard in the nation. Bueckers shared two major NCAA Division I freshman of the year awards with Caitlin Clark of Iowa—the Tamika Catchings Award, presented by the USBWA, and the WBCA Freshman of the Year award. As a freshman, she averaged 20 points, 5.8 assists, 4.9 rebounds and 2.3 steals per game, shooting 46.4 percent from three-point range. Bueckers recorded 168 assists, the most by a freshman in program history, despite a shortened season due to the COVID-19 pandemic. In July 2021, she won the Best Female College Athlete ESPY Award. Analysts have considered Bueckers' freshman season to be among the best in UConn and NCAA history.

Bueckers was named to the university's dean's list her freshman year, which required a GPA of at least 3.72, and was involved in social justice causes.

=== Sophomore season ===
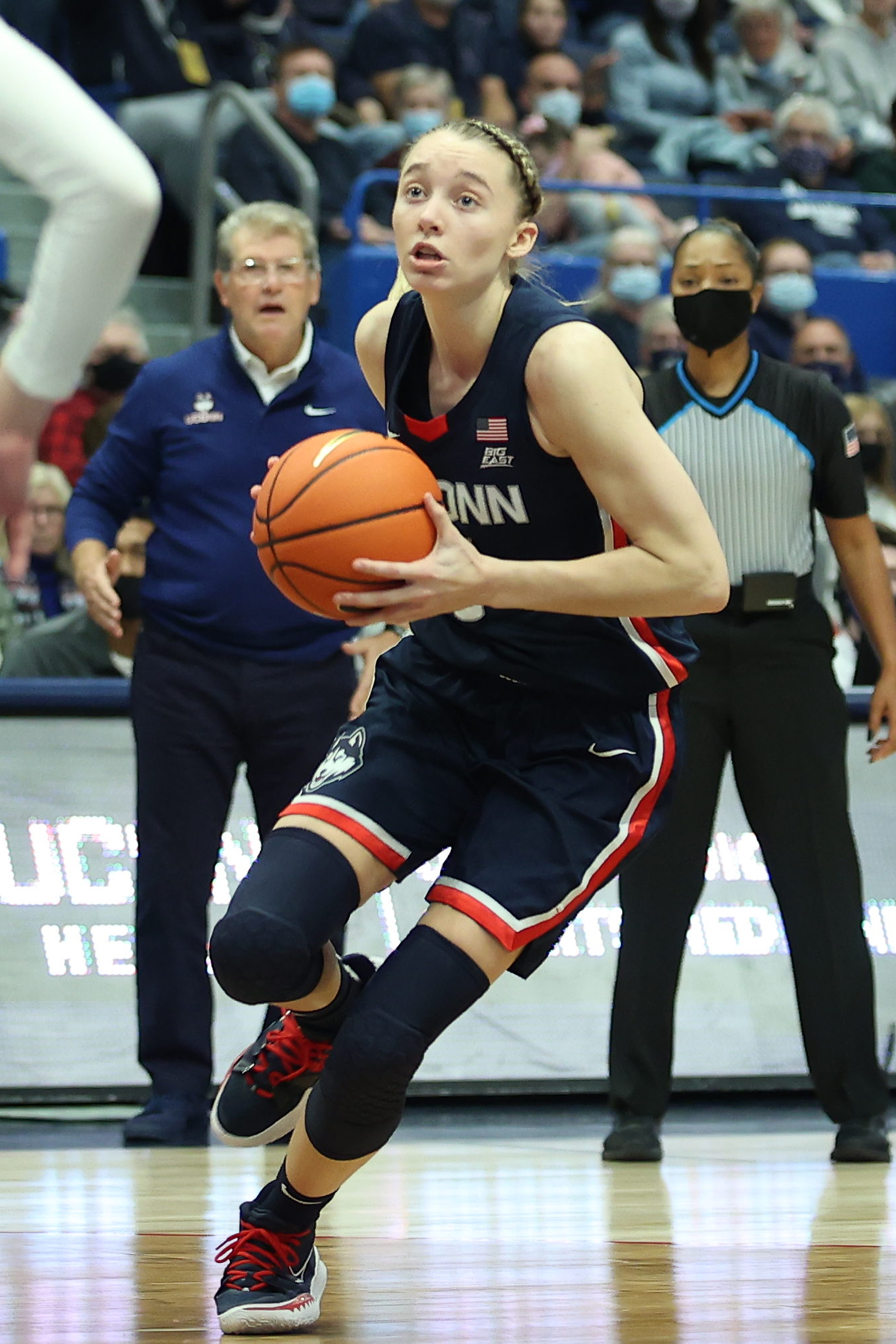
Bueckers in her sophomore season debut against Arkansas in 2021

On April 30, 2021, Bueckers underwent surgery on her right ankle to repair an osteochondral defect, joint damage involving the bone and cartilage. She could not practice for most of the offseason while recovering from surgery, but was cleared to return by October. Bueckers entered her sophomore season as a unanimous selection for both Big East Preseason Player of the Year and the AP preseason All-America team. Among the newcomers to UConn was Azzi Fudd, the number one recruit in the 2021 class and Bueckers' close friend.

Bueckers made her season debut on November 14, 2021, recording a season-high 34 points, six rebounds, and four assists in a 95–80 win against Arkansas. She matched the program record for points in a season opener set by Kerry Bascom in 1989. On December 5, Bueckers injured her left knee while dribbling the ball up the court with 40 seconds remaining in a 73–54 victory over Notre Dame, and had to be carried off the floor by teammates. An MRI and CT scans revealed that she suffered a tibial plateau fracture with an estimated recovery period of six to eight weeks. On December 13, Bueckers underwent surgery to repair the fracture and a previously undisclosed lateral meniscus tear. She was expected to be sidelined for eight more weeks. During Bueckers' absence, UConn had a 15–4 record and briefly fell out of the top 10 in the AP Poll for the first time since 2005. The team's winning streaks of 240 games against unranked teams and 169 games against conference opponents ended in losses to Georgia Tech and Villanova, respectively.

Bueckers was cleared to return against St. John's on February 25, 2022. She came off the bench for the first time in her career and scored 8 points, playing only 13 minutes due to a minutes restriction, in a 93–38 victory. Bueckers continued to receive limited playing time until the NCAA tournament, and UConn won the Big East tournament despite her scoring only two points in the championship game against Villanova. Her offensive production also declined from before her injury. On March 28, at the Elite Eight of the NCAA Tournament, Bueckers led her team to a 91–87 double-overtime win over top-seeded NC State, as UConn reached its 14th consecutive Final Four. She scored a game-high 27 points on 10-15 from the field, including 15 points in the two overtime periods (4-5 from the field and 6-6 from the free-throw line), and was named MOP of the Bridgeport Regional. In the Final Four, Bueckers recorded 14 points, five assists and four rebounds in a 63–58 victory against top-seeded Stanford, the defending champions. In a 64–49 loss to top-seeded South Carolina at the national championship game, Bueckers was the only UConn player to score in double digits as she posted 14 points and six rebounds, and was named to the Final Four All-Tournament Team. Bueckers was an AP All-American Honorable Mention selection. As a sophomore, she averaged 14.6 points, four rebounds and 3.9 assists per game.

In addition to her athletic honors, Bueckers was again named to the university's dean's list for her first semester as a sophomore.

=== Redshirt year ===
On August 3, 2022, UConn announced that Bueckers had torn the anterior cruciate ligament (ACL) in her left knee during a pick-up game on August 1 and would miss the entire 2022–23 season. She received an additional year of college eligibility after redshirting the season. On September 1, Bueckers announced she would return to UConn for the 2023–24 season instead of declaring for the 2023 WNBA draft, for which she was eligible. In her absence, the team finished the 2022–23 season with a 31–6 record, winning Big East regular season and tournament titles. UConn lost to Ohio State in the Sweet 16 of the NCAA tournament, marking the first time they did not reach the Final Four since 2008.

=== Junior season ===
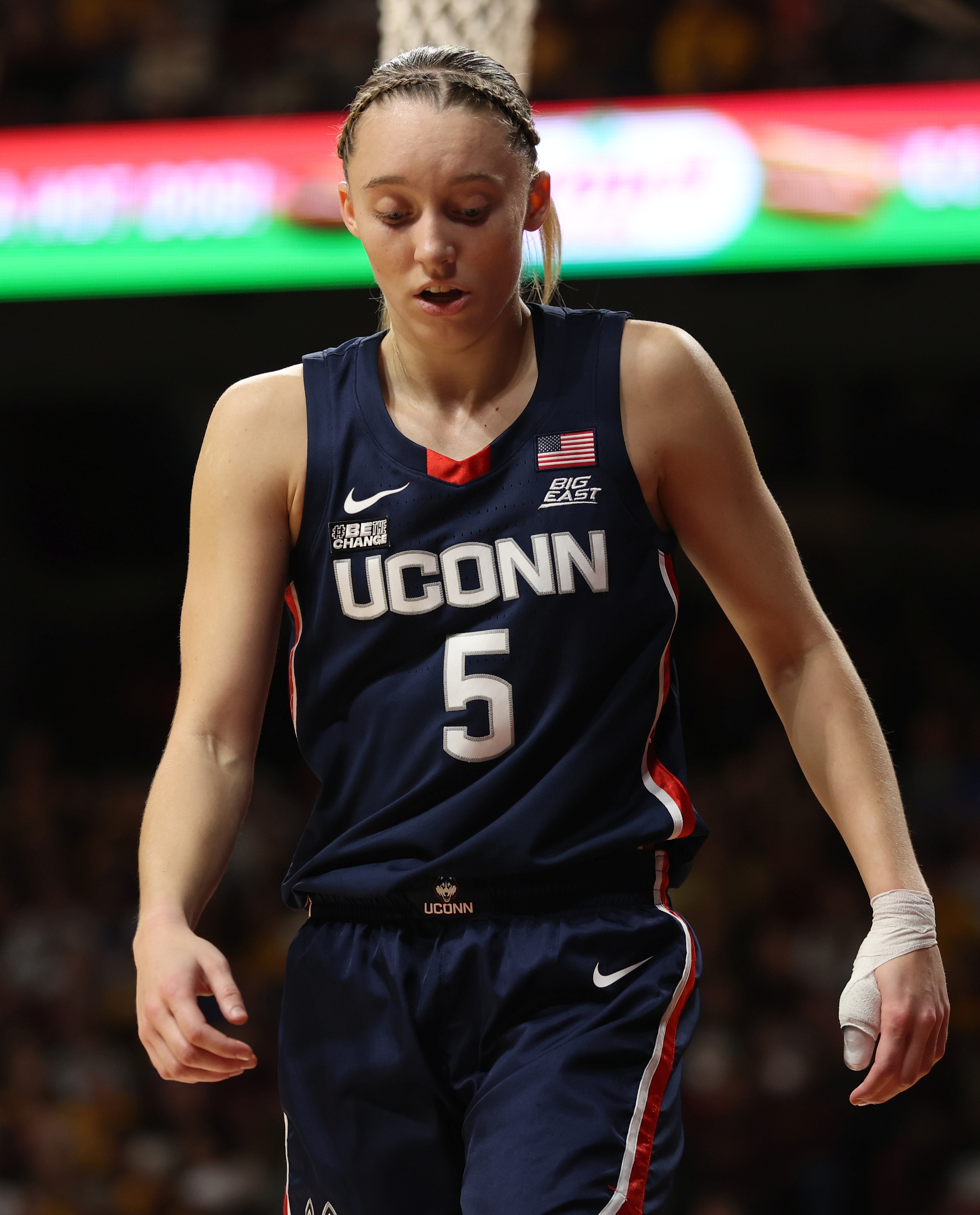
Bueckers vs. Minnesota in 2023

On August 9, 2023, Bueckers announced that she was fully cleared to return to the court; two months earlier, she had been cleared for all activities except for five-on-five play. Entering her redshirt junior season, she was named an AP preseason All-American and Big East Preseason Player of the Year. On November 8, Bueckers made her season debut, recording eight points, seven rebounds and four assists in 21 minutes in a 102–58 win over Dayton. On November 16, she scored 31 points in a 78–67 loss to AP No. 2 UCLA at the Cayman Islands Classic. Bueckers tied Maya Moore as the fastest player in UConn history to reach 1,000 career points (55 games) on December 10, scoring 26 points in a 76–64 victory against AP No. 24 North Carolina. On January 17, 2024, she posted a season-high 32 points and seven rebounds in an 83–59 win over Seton Hall. At the end of the regular season, Bueckers was named Big East Player of the Year and was a unanimous first-team all-conference selection. She helped UConn win the Big East tournament, where she was named MOP after recording 27 points and five blocks in a 78–42 win over Georgetown in the final. In the second round of the 2024 NCAA tournament, Bueckers tied her season-high of 32 points, while recording 10 rebounds, six assists and four steals, in a 72–64 win over Syracuse. In the Elite Eight, she posted 28 points, 10 rebounds and six assists in an 80–73 victory over one-seed USC, earning Portland 3 Regional MOP honors. She scored 17 points in a 71–69 loss to one-seed Iowa in the Final Four.

For a second time, Bueckers was a unanimous first-team All-American, being selected to the WBCA Coaches' All-American team and earning first-team All-American recognition from the AP and the USBWA. She was also named the Big East Scholar-Athlete of the Year and earned CSC First Team Academic All-American honors. On February 16, 2024, she announced that she would return to UConn for the 2024–25 season, despite being projected as a top-three pick in the 2024 WNBA draft.

=== Senior season ===
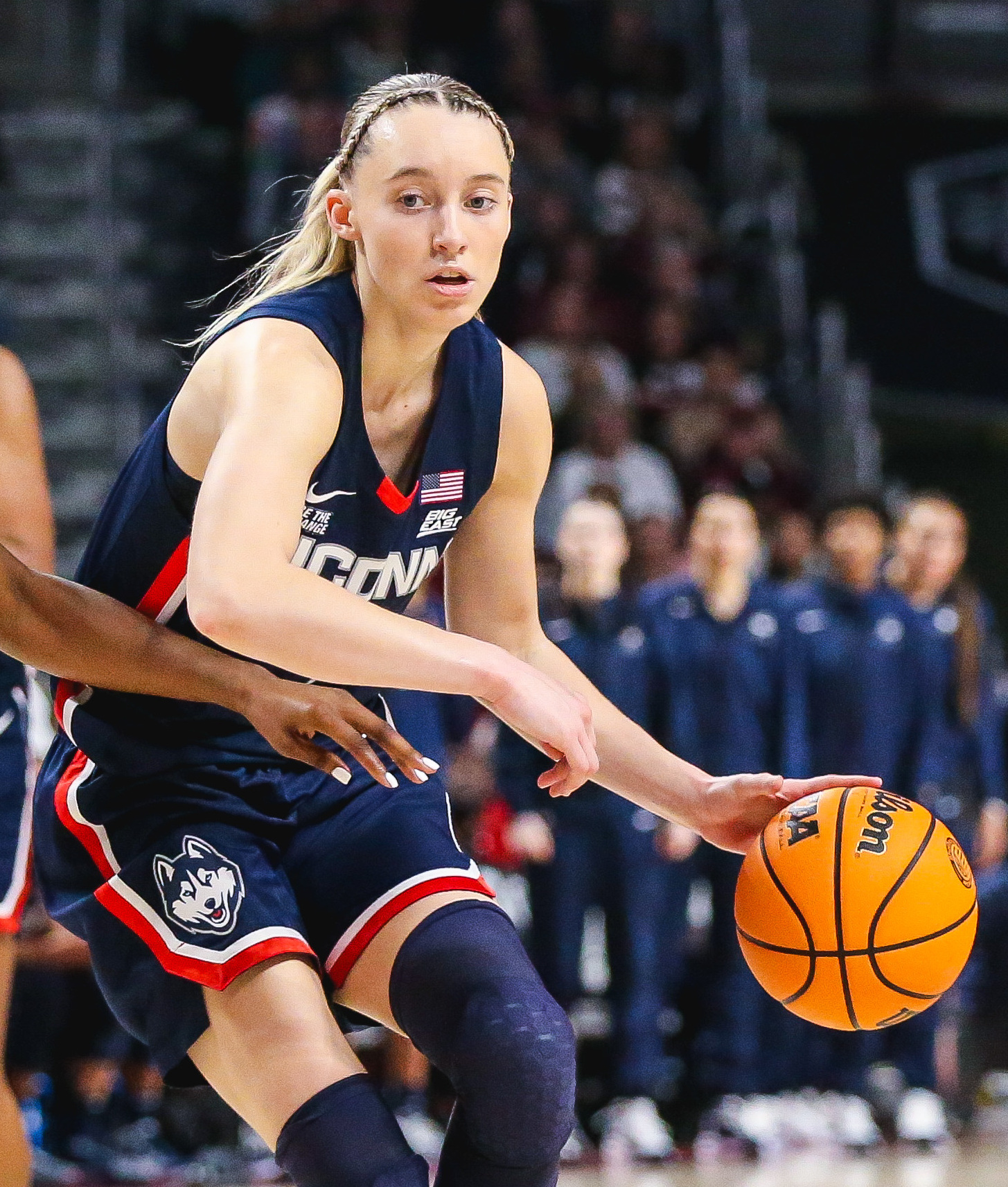
Bueckers vs. South Carolina in February 2025

In her final season at UConn, Bueckers led the Huskies to an undefeated Big East season (18–0), a Big East Tournament championship, and ultimately their 12th NCAA national title. Bueckers averaged 19.9 points, 4.6 assists, 4.4 rebounds, 2.1 steals, and 0.8 blocks per game in the 38 games she played.

Bueckers entered her senior season as an AP preseason All-American and the Big East Preseason Player of the Year. On November 7, 2024, she opened her season with 13 points, seven assists, and five steals in an 86–32 win over Boston University. Eight days later, Bueckers scored 29 points, including 16 in the first quarter, in a 69–58 win over AP No. 14 North Carolina. On November 27, she scored 29 points again, leading UConn to a 73–60 victory over AP No. 18 Ole Miss at the Baha Mar Championship final. Bueckers suffered a left knee sprain after colliding with an opposing player against Villanova on January 5, 2025 and missed her team's next two games. As part of an 18-point effort against Seton Hall on January 19, she became the fastest player in program history to reach 2,000 career points after 102 career games. On February 16, Bueckers recorded 12 points and 10 assists for her first double-double of the season, helping UConn upset AP No. 4 South Carolina, 87–58. During her final game of the regular season, she was inducted into the Huskies of Honor, a program that honors All-American players at UConn. Bueckers received the Big East Player of the Year award for the third time in her career, and was unanimously named first-team All-Big East. In the 2025 Big East tournament final, she recorded 24 points and eight rebounds in a 70–50 victory over Creighton. She became the first player to win the Big East tournament MOP three times.

Bueckers opened the 2025 NCAA tournament against Arkansas State in the first round and scored 11 points in a 103-34 win. In the second round of the tournament, she scored 34 points in a 91–57 win over South Dakota State. In the Sweet 16, she scored a career-high 40 points, including 29 in the second half, in an 82–59 victory over Oklahoma. She became the fourth UConn player to record at least 40 points in a game and the first to do so in the NCAA tournament. In the Elite Eight, Bueckers posted 31 points and six assists, leading her team to a 78–64 win over top-seeded USC and earning Spokane 4 Region MOP honors, becoming the second player in UConn and NCAA tournament history to be named a four-time Regional MOP. She tied her own program record with three consecutive 30-point games, while scoring a total of 105 points, the most by a UConn player over a three-game span, and became the first player in NCAA tournament history to record four 25-point games within the Elite Eight. Bueckers won her first national championship, scoring 17 points in an 82–59 win over top-seeded South Carolina in the title game on April 6, 2025. She surpassed Maya Moore for the most career points by a UConn player in the NCAA tournament and moved to third among all players. Bueckers was a unanimous first-team All-American for the third time in her career, becoming just the 12th player in history to be named a three-time AP first-team All-American. She received the Wade Trophy as the top NCAA Division I player, and won her second Nancy Lieberman Award as the top Division I point guard. She finished her career with the highest scoring average (19.9) and the third-most points (2,439) in program history. On May 5, she was announced as the winner of the 2025 Honda Sports Award. On October 22, she was named a finalist for the 2025 NCAA Woman of the Year Award.

On March 28, 2025, Bueckers announced that she would enter the 2025 WNBA draft. She was projected to be the first overall pick in the draft by many publications.

== Professional career ==
=== WNBA ===
==== Dallas Wings (2025–present) ====
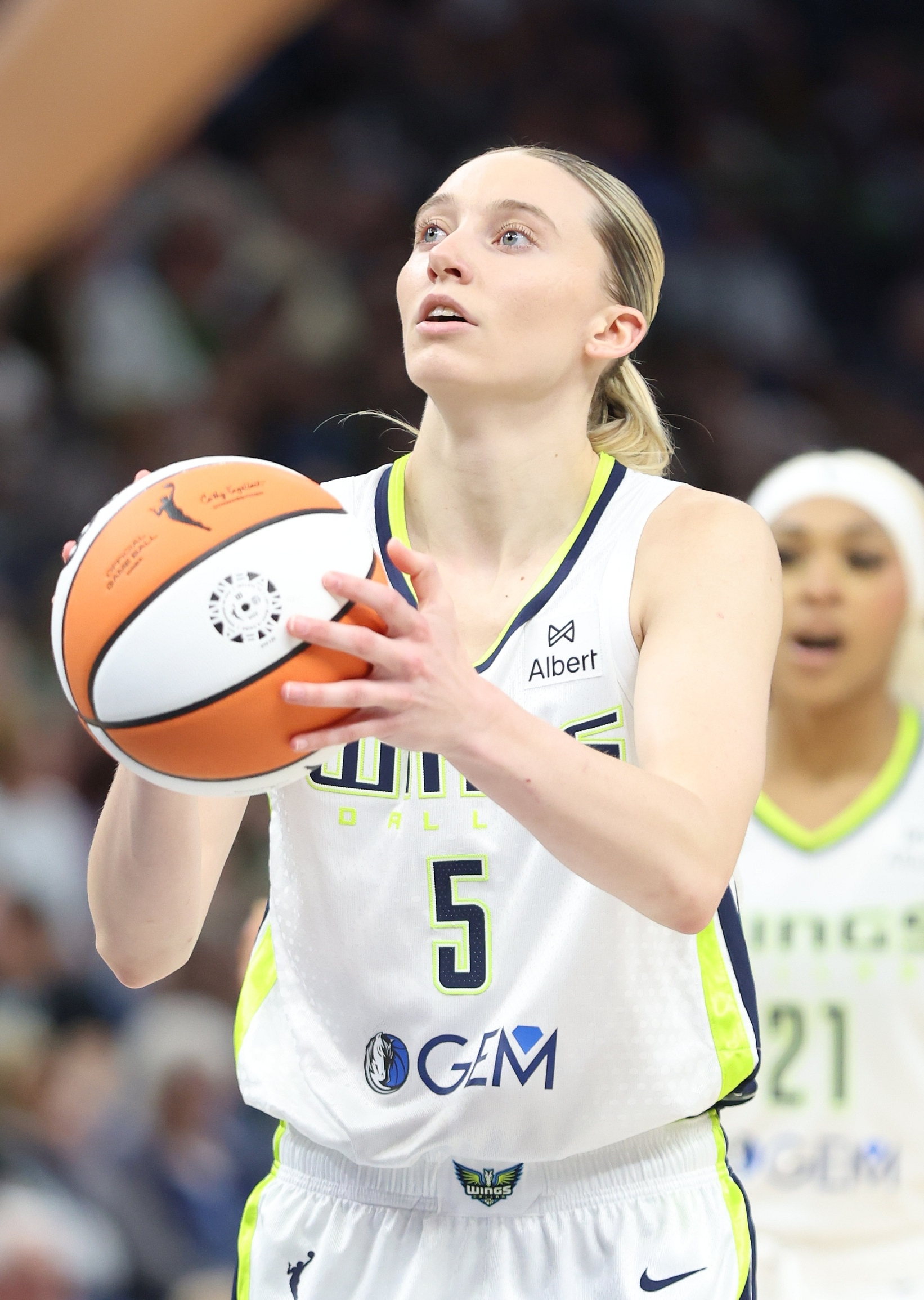
Bueckers with the Dallas Wings vs Minnesota Lynx in 2025

Bueckers was selected as the first overall pick in the 2025 WNBA draft by the Dallas Wings. On May 16, 2025, she made her regular season debut, scoring 10 points in a 112–78 loss to the Minnesota Lynx. Five days later, Bueckers had her first career double-double, with 12 points and 10 assists in an 85–81 loss to the Lynx. On May 27, Bueckers helped the Wings to their first win of the season, accruing 21 points and 7 assists against the Connecticut Sun in a return to her college stomping grounds. Bueckers shattered her previous career-high on June 11, scoring 35 points on 13/19 shooting from the field (5 of 7 from three) despite the loss to the Phoenix Mercury. It was her first appearance in four games while in concussion protocol and dealing with an illness.

Bueckers became the fastest player in league history to reach 200 points, 50 rebounds, and 50 assists. On June 30, she was selected to play in the 2025 WNBA All-Star Game, becoming the eighth WNBA rookie to be named an All-Star starter.

On July 3, Bueckers was awarded June's Rookie of the Month, after averaging 21.6 points, 4.1 rebounds, 5.0 assists, 1.7 steals, and 0.9 blocks per game.

On August 4, she was awarded July's Rookie of the Month after averaging 18.2 points, 5.2 assists, and 1.8 steals per game. On August 15, in a 97–96 loss to the Los Angeles Sparks, Bueckers scored 29 points, 5 assists and 4 rebounds, breaking the Wings' rookie assist record with her 143rd assist of the year and became the fastest rookie in WNBA history to reach 500 points and 100 assists.

On August 20, Bueckers scored 44 points in an 81–80 loss to the Los Angeles Sparks. It was the most points by a rookie in WNBA history and the 10th most points by any player in WNBA history. It ties Cynthia Cooper-Dyke's 1997 record for most points scored in a game by a WNBA first-year player, although Bueckers' achievement is considered to be the "rookie" record, as Cooper-Dyke's record was set in the WNBA's inaugural season, and the 34 year-old Cooper-Dyke had played in professional leagues prior to that. Bueckers also became the first player in WNBA history to score 40-plus points in a game while shooting 80% from the field. After this win by the Sparks, the Wings were officially out of playoff contention. On August 24, Bueckers scored nine points in an 90–81 loss to the Golden State Valkyries, bringing an end to her run of 30 straight double-digit scoring performances to start her career. The streak is the longest ever by a guard and third overall for the most consecutive double-digit games by a rookie in WNBA history, placing Bueckers only behind Candace Parker (32 games) and A'ja Wilson (33 games).

On September 3, for the third consecutive month, Bueckers was named the WNBA Rookie of the Month, after averaging 20.3 points, 3.7 rebounds, and 5.0 assists in August. She became the 10th player in league history and first in franchise history to earn the distinction three times. On September 4, in an 84–80 loss to the Golden State Valkyries, Bueckers recorded 27 points, six assists, four rebounds, and four steals, becoming the Wings' franchise rookie scoring leader, surpassing Arike Ogunbowale's 2019 record of 630 points. On September 11, in a 97–76 win over the Phoenix Mercury, Bueckers concluded her rookie campaign with 24 points, eight rebounds, and seven assists. The Dallas Wings finished the regular season with a 10–34 record, falling to last place in league standings.

Over the course of 36 games, Bueckers averaged 19.2 points, 5.4 assists, 3.9 rebounds, and 1.6 steals per game. She led all rookies this season in total points (692) and assists (194), as well as points and assists per game. She became the second rookie in WNBA history to record multiple games of at least 35 points. Bueckers also set the franchise rookie record for points and assists, and recorded the third-most points and assists by a rookie in league history. She was also the only player in the season to rank in the top ten in points, assists, and steals per game, as well as being the only player to score 40 or more points in a single game. Bueckers was named WNBA Rookie of the Year, receiving 70 of 72 votes, and was selected for the All-WNBA Second Team and All-Rookie Team.

=== Unrivaled ===
On April 13, 2025, ESPN reported that Bueckers had signed a 3-year deal with three-on-three basketball league Unrivaled. The first year of her Unrivaled contract is reportedly paying her more than her entire four-year WNBA rookie contract.

On September 22, 2025 Bueckers was officially announced as one of the players for the 2026 Unrivaled season. She was drafted to Breeze BC on November 5. Bueckers made her Unrivaled debut on January 5, 2026, scoring the club's first-ever basket and a team-high 24 points in a 69–62 win over Phantom BC. On January 9, she recorded her first Unrivaled double-double with 16 points, 10 rebounds, and 6 assists in a 73–62 win over Hive BC. Two days later, on January 11, Bueckers posted 15 points, 9 rebounds, and 9 assists in Breeze's 73–69 loss to Rose BC, the team's first loss of the season. On January 19, Bueckers recorded a career-high 37 points on 14-of-19 shooting, along with 8 rebounds and 5 assists in an 83–64 win over Mist BC; She also extended her perfect free throw streak to 13-for-13 through the first five games of the 2026 season, winning the first-ever Unrivaled Free Throw Challenge and its $50,000 prize. Breeze BC finished January with a 4–4 record. On February 1, Bueckers recorded her second double-double with 32 points and 11 assists in an 81–56 win over Rose BC. On February 6, in a 70–68 loss to Hive BC, she registered 28 points, 7 rebounds, and 5 assists, leading the league in 20-point games with eight total, including seven consecutive games of 20 or more points.

== National team career ==
=== Junior national team ===
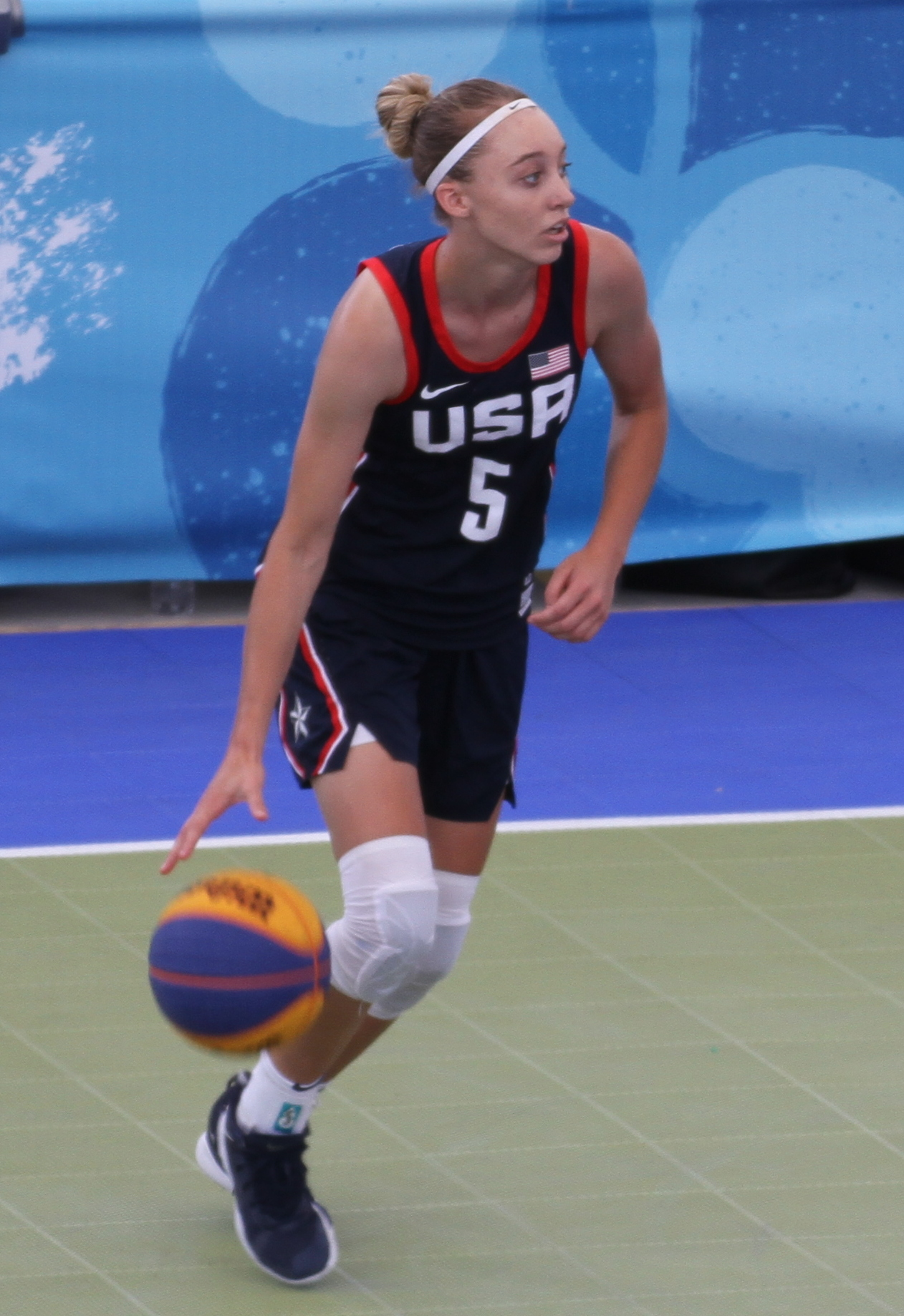
Bueckers playing 3x3 basketball at the 2018 Summer Youth Olympics

Bueckers represented the United States at the 2017 FIBA Under-16 Women's Americas Championship in Buenos Aires, Argentina. In five games, she averaged 11 points, three steals, 2.8 rebounds, and 2.2 assists per game, helping her team win the gold medal. Bueckers played at the 2018 FIBA Under-17 Women's World Cup in Minsk, Belarus. In seven games, she averaged 9.7 points, 4.7 assists, and 3.6 rebounds per game, leading the tournament in assist-to-turnover ratio at 4.13. Bueckers led the United States to a gold medal after recording eight points and ten assists versus France in the final.

At the 2019 FIBA Under-19 Women's Basketball World Cup in Bangkok, Thailand in July, Bueckers averaged 11.6 points, 4.1 rebounds, and a tournament-high 5.4 assists per game. She posted 17 points, eight rebounds, and five assists in a 74–70 overtime win over Australia for the gold medal. Bueckers was named Most Valuable Player and made the All-Tournament Team. On December 10, 2019, she was honored as USA Basketball Female Athlete of the Year.

=== Senior national team ===
Bueckers made her senior team debut on March 12, 2026, earning 16 points, four rebounds and three assists in a 91–48 win over Puerto Rico in the FIBA World Cup qualification tournament in San Juan, Puerto Rico.

=== 3x3 basketball ===
In October 2018, Bueckers won a gold medal for the United States in 3x3 basketball at the Summer Youth Olympics in Buenos Aires, helping her team win all seven of its games. She was the youngest member of the senior national team at the 2019 World Beach Games in Doha, Qatar, on a roster featuring WNBA players Napheesa Collier and Jackie Young. Bueckers averaged 6.5 points per game, second-highest on the team, as the United States lost to Brazil in the quarterfinals and finished in fifth place.

== Player profile ==
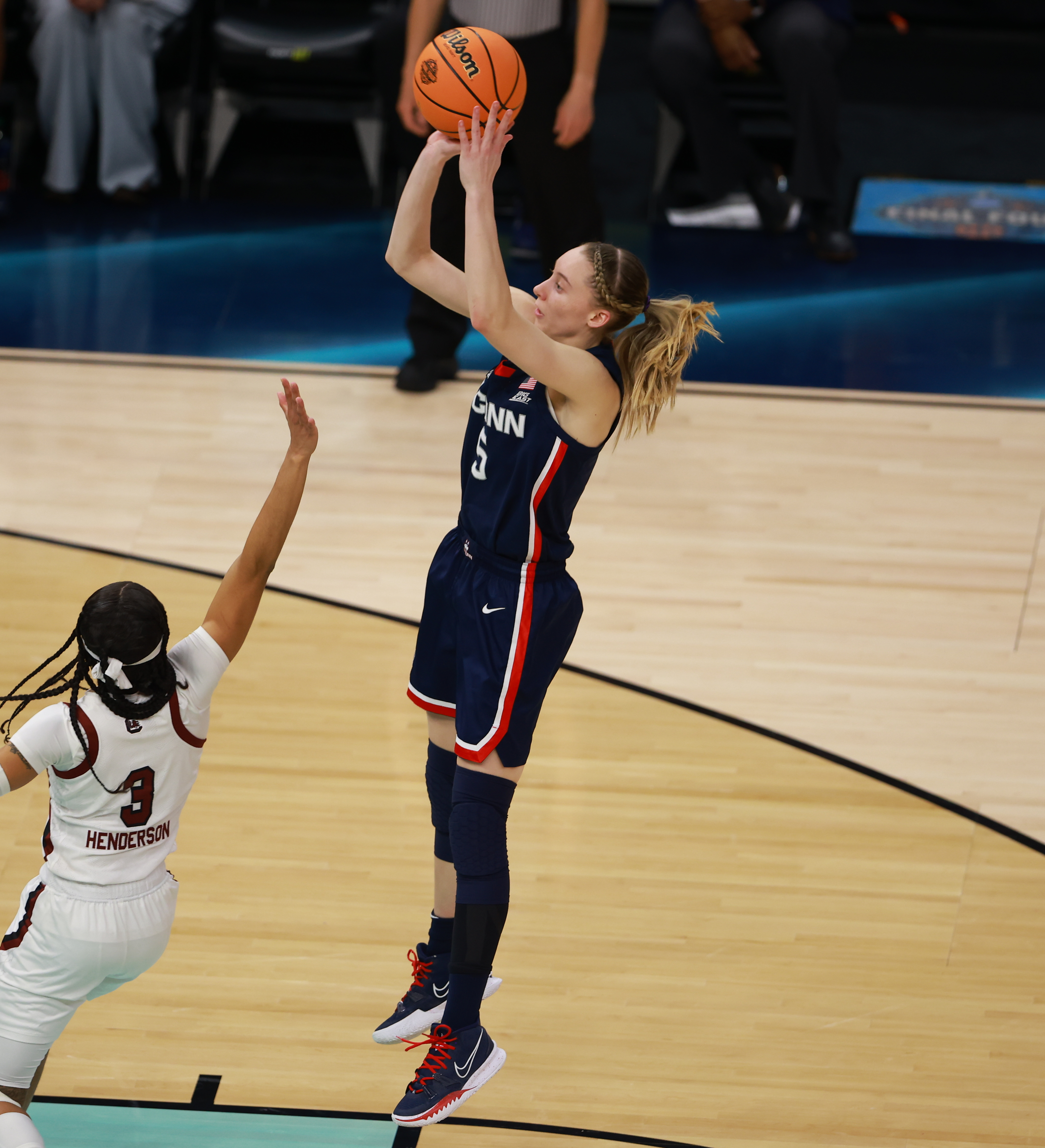
Bueckers taking a mid-range jump shot at the 2022 NCAA Division I Championship Game

Listed at 6 feet 0 inches (1.83 m), Bueckers has typically played as a point guard, though in the 2023–24 season, she has started at power forward due to UConn's lack of available forwards. Analysts praise her size, quickness and agility. Bueckers, who has described herself as a pass-first player, is lauded for her passing, court vision and her ability to read the defense. Analyst Monica McNutt called her "arguably one of the best playmakers in the game." As a scorer, Bueckers is known for her mid-range game and also scores efficiently at the rim and from three-point range. Her pull-up jump shot has been described as her signature move, being likened to Sue Bird by UConn associate head coach Chris Dailey. Her playing style has drawn comparisons to Diana Taurasi, due to her size, confidence and scoring ability, though UConn head coach Geno Auriemma has also mentioned several similarities between her and Breanna Stewart. Bueckers models her game after Taurasi and Kyrie Irving.

Since high school, Bueckers has been labeled a generational talent by analysts and coaches, including South Carolina head coach Dawn Staley and Minnesota Lynx head coach Cheryl Reeve. In her freshman season in college, she was proclaimed "basketball's next big thing" by USA Today.

Bueckers is often recognized for her humility, team-first mentality, and vocal leadership. Teammates and coaches have praised her for fostering a strong locker room culture, and mentoring younger players.

== Career statistics ==
Legend
GP	Games played	GS	Games started	MPG	Minutes per game
FG%	Field goal percentage	3P%	3-point field goal percentage	FT%	Free throw percentage
RPG	Rebounds per game	APG	Assists per game	SPG	Steals per game
BPG	Blocks per game	TO	Turnovers per game	PPG	Points per game

**Bold**	Denotes career high
*	Denotes seasons in which Bueckers won an NCAA Championship
‡	WNBA record

=== WNBA ===
==== Regular season ====
WNBA regular season statistics
Year	Team	GP	GS	MPG	FG%	3P%	FT%	RPG	APG	SPG	BPG	TO	PPG
2025	Dallas	36	36	**33.3**	.477	.331	**.888**	3.9	5.4	**1.6**	**.5**	**2.0**	19.2
2026	Dallas	**42**	**42**	32.8	**.512**	**.410**	.871	**4.1**	**5.9**	1.0	.4	2.2	**20.9**
**Career**	2 years, 1 team	78	78	33.0	.496	.380	.880	4.1	5.7	1.2	.5	2.1	20.1
**Career**	All-Star	2	2	23.5	.389	.250	1.000	1.0	7.5	.5	.0	.5	9.0

==== Playoffs ====
WNBA playoff statistics
Year	Team	GP	GS	MPG	FG%	3P%	FT%	RPG	APG	SPG	BPG	TO	PPG
2026	Dallas	3	3	35.7	.405	.400	.933	3.7	4.0	1.3	.7	1.0	16.0
**Career**	1 year, 1 team	3	3	35.7	.405	.400	.933	3.7	4.0	1.3	.7	1.0	16.0

=== College ===
The following statistics represent Bueckers's collegiate career at the University of Connecticut.

Year	Team	GP	GS	MPG	FG%	3P%	FT%	RPG	APG	SPG	BPG	TO	PPG
2020–21	UConn	29	29	**36.1**	.524	**.464**	.869	4.9	**5.8**	**2.3**	.4	2.5	20.0
2021–22	UConn	17	13	29.2	**.544**	.353	.714	4.0	3.9	1.5	.6	1.7	14.6
2022–23	UConn	Did not play due to injury											
2023–24	UConn	**39**	**39**	31.9	.530	.416	.834	**5.2**	3.8	2.2	**1.4**	1.5	**21.9**
2024–25*	UConn	38	38	30.3	.534	.419	**.889**	4.4	4.6	2.1	.8	**1.3**	19.9
**Career**		123	119	32.0	.531	.423	.850	4.7	4.6	2.1	.8	1.7	19.8
Statistics gathered from Sports-Reference.

== Personal life ==
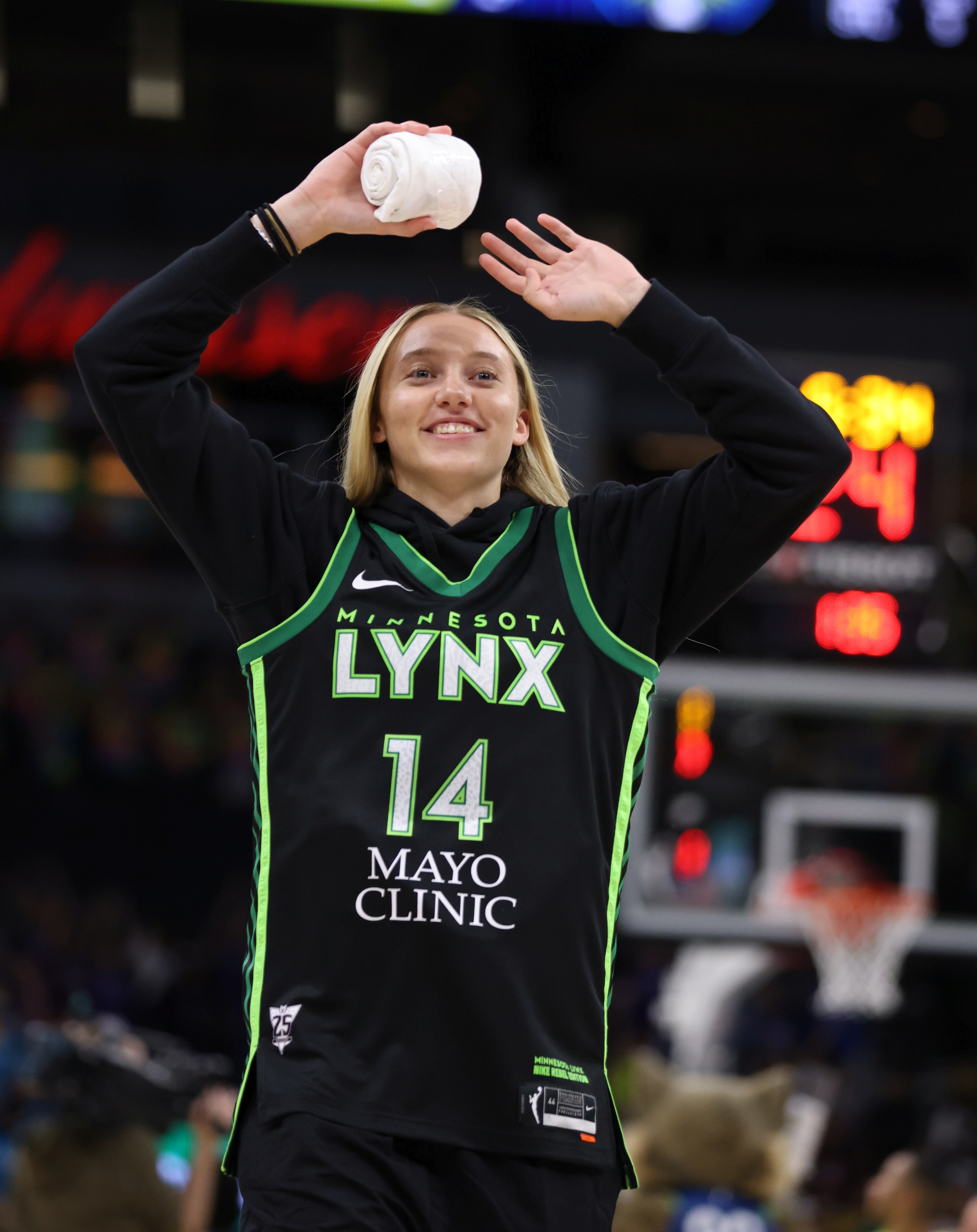
Bueckers attending a Minnesota Lynx game in 2023

Bueckers' father, Bob Bueckers, is a software engineer and played high school basketball as a point guard. Her mother, Amy Fuller (née Dettbarn), represented the University of St. Thomas in cross country and track and field. When Bueckers was three years old, her parents divorced. She remained with her father while her mother remarried Brian Fuller and moved to Billings, Montana. Her father also began a new relationship and later had a son, Drew. Bueckers has another younger brother, Ryan, and a younger sister, Lauren.

She is a Christian and attributes her confidence and success on the basketball court to God.

During her college career at UConn, Bueckers frequently wore her hair in a braided ponytail; according to The Sporting News, the style became a recognizable part of her public image and was widely emulated by fans.

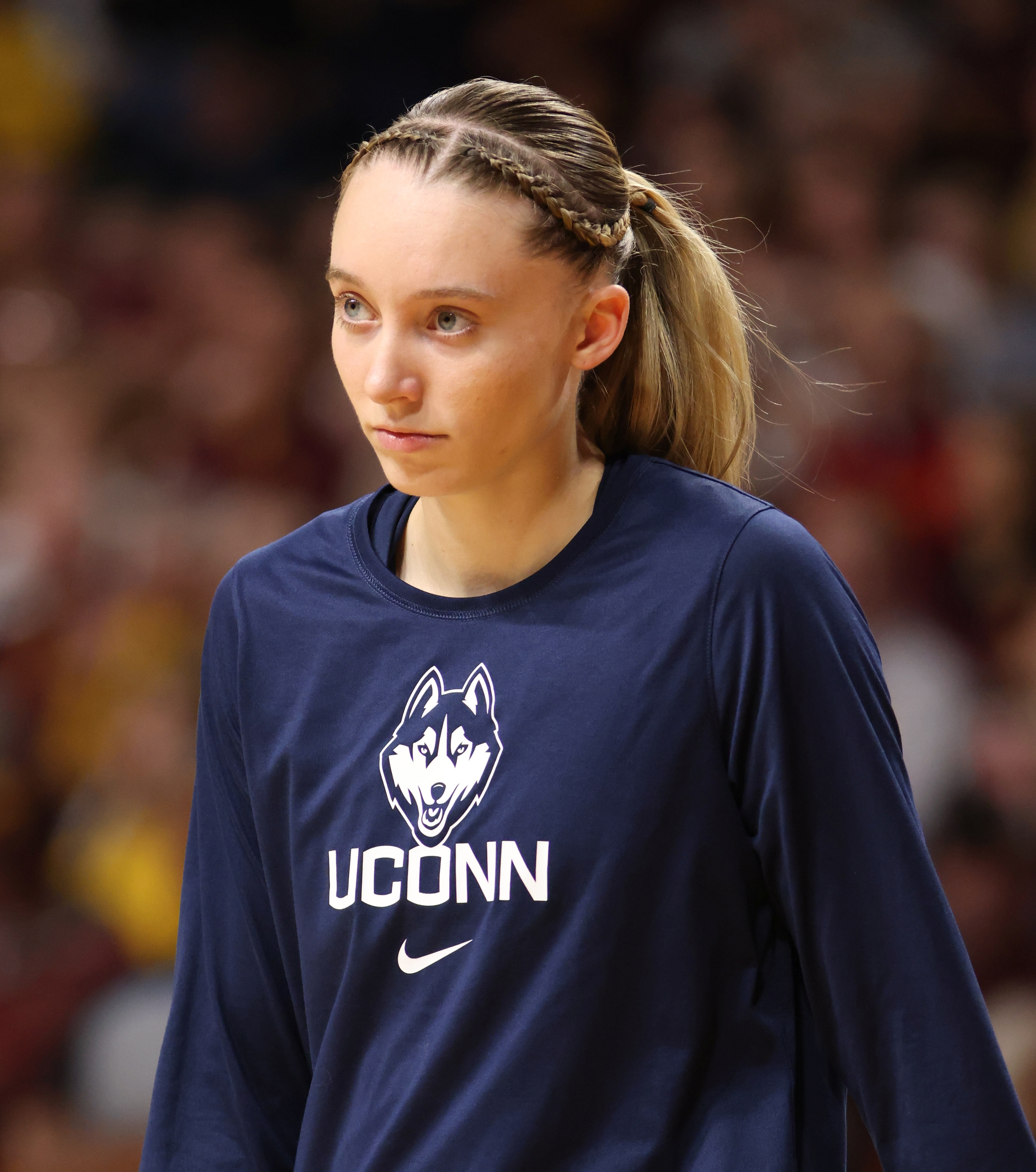
Bueckers during her college career at UConn, where she is sporting her braided ponytail.

She has hosted a charity basketball clinic called "Buckets with Bueckers" for young athletes in Minnesota and Montana.

Bueckers has voiced support for the Black Lives Matter movement, in part because her half-brother, Drew, whom she has described as her best friend, is biracial. She participated in marches for racial justice after the murder of George Floyd in her home state of Minnesota. During her acceptance speech at the 2021 ESPY Awards, Bueckers celebrated and honored Black women, bringing attention to what she said are racial disparities in media coverage of women's basketball players.

In 2025, Bueckers confirmed she was in a relationship with former UConn and current Wings teammate Azzi Fudd. The pair have been close friends since they were 14 and 15 and competing against each other for starting point guard on the U16 USA Basketball national team. On November 6, 2026, on Fudd's podcast Fudd Around and Find Out, Bueckers confirmed that she and Fudd had split up. The couple broke up before Fudd was drafted by the Wings.

=== Business interests ===
Bueckers is represented by agent Lindsay Kagawa Colas of Wasserman. She signed with Wasserman as a name, image and likeness (NIL) client in August 2021, about one month after the NCAA allowed student-athletes to be compensated for the use of their NIL. Described as the "face of NIL" for women's basketball by The Athletic in 2022, industry analysts have projected her as having one of the highest earning potentials from NIL among college athletes, because of both her success in basketball and her large social media following. On April 4, 2022, her Instagram account reached one million followers, making her reportedly the first women's college basketball player to achieve the mark. She was also the inaugural winner of the Best NIL Athlete of the Year award by Sports Business Journal.

In November 2021, Bueckers signed her first two major endorsement deals with StockX and Gatorade, becoming the first college athlete to sign with Gatorade. On September 6, 2023, Bueckers signed a multiyear deal with Nike; as part of the deal, she promoted the company's new GT Hustle 2 shoe. Bueckers also has a special colorway of the GT Hustle 3, making her the first college athlete to have her own Nike shoe. She has also signed deals with Crocs, Bose and Nerf. She is an advisor for Overtime Select, a basketball league created by sports media company, Overtime, for girls high school players.

Bueckers' scoring success has earned her the nickname "Paige Buckets". On July 13, 2021, she filed for a trademark on the nickname for use on athletic apparel, such as shirts, pants, jackets, footwear, hats and uniforms.

In August 2024, it was announced that Bueckers had signed an NIL deal with the 3-on-3 basketball league Unrivaled, with plans for her to make her league debut in the 2026 season.

=== Philanthropy ===
Bueckers created the Paige Bueckers Foundation.

On February 7, 2022, she announced a partnership with Cash App, through which she launched the Paige Bueckers Foundation to promote social justice and create opportunities for families and children. On March 31, Bueckers became the first student-athlete brand ambassador for Chegg. Working with the nonprofit branch of Chegg, she partnered with hunger relief company Goodr to host a free pop-up grocery market in Minneapolis to address food insecurity among college students. In the following year, she opened another store in Hopkins West Junior High School, where she had attended.

=== Influencer ===
Bueckers has been recognized as an influencer in basketball, fashion, and culture. During her senior season in high school, Star Tribune columnist Chip Scoggins compared her influence in the state to that of Lindsay Whalen, writing, "A generation of girls—now young women—throughout the Twin Cities and greater Minnesota grew up idolizing [Whalen] as a basketball star. Bueckers is having that same impact on a new generation of girls."

In 2022, Bueckers was named to the Fortune 40 Under 40 list, which honors influential young people in business, and The Athletic's College Sports 40 Under 40 list, which recognizes the most influential young people in the college sports industry. On May 16, 2025, the day of Bueckers' WNBA debut, her hometown of Hopkins, Minnesota, renamed itself "Paige Bueckers, Minnesota" for the day.

On September 30, 2025, Bueckers was named to the 2025 TIME100 Next list as one of the most influential rising stars of the year. Diana Taurasi wrote about Bueckers for Time: "The easiest thing to do in a game is shoot the basketball every single time you touch it, especially when you're the best player on the court. And Paige Bueckers is the best player on the court 99.99% of the time because she's so gifted offensively, defensively—she disrupts so much. The hardest thing to do is pass the ball. Paige does it, and that's what sets her apart." On October 6, Bueckers was named to the Marie Claire's 2025 Changemakers list, for using her spotlight to speak out for gender equity and mental health in sports. On December 7, Bueckers was named one of The New York Times' 67 Most Stylish People of 2025. On December 9, she was named to the 50 Names in the Boardroom list.

== Awards and honors ==
=== Team USA ===
- (gold) FIBA World Cup (2026)
- (gold) FIBA Under-19 World Cup (2019)
- (gold) FIBA Under-17 World Cup (2018)
- (gold) FIBA Americas Under-16 Championship (2017)
- (gold) Youth Olympic Games (2018)
- (gold) Latvia U17 International Invitational (2018)
- (gold) Spokane Hoopfest (2018)
- (gold) USA Basketball 3×3 U18 National Championship (2018)
- USA Basketball Female Athlete of the Year (2019)
- FIBA Under-19 World Cup MVP (2019)

=== WNBA ===
- PBWA Tamika Catchings Award (2025)
- WNBA Rookie of the Year (2025)
  - AP WNBA Rookie of the Year (2025)
- 2× All-WNBA Second Team (2025, 2026)
  - 2× AP All-WNBA Second Team (2025, 2026)
- WNBA All-Rookie Team (2025)
  - AP WNBA All-Rookie Team (2025)
- 2× WNBA All-Star (2025, 2026)
- WNBA Player of the Week (Week 8, 2026)
- 3× WNBA Rookie of the Month (June–August 2025)

=== Unrivaled ===
- First-team All-Unrivaled (2026)
- Xfinity Free Throw Challenge winner (2026)

=== NCAA ===
- NCAA champion (2025)
- 5× Big East tournament champion (2021–2025)
- 5× Big East regular season champion (2021–2025)
- Phil Knight Legacy tournament champion (2022)
- Baha Mar Women's Championship (2024)
- Honda Sports Award (2025)
- Wade Trophy (2025)
- AP Player of the Year (2021)
- Naismith College Player of the Year (2021)
- USBWA National Player of the Year (2021)
- John R. Wooden Award (2021)
- Best Female College Athlete ESPY Award (2021)
- 3× Unanimous first-team All-American (2021, 2024, 2025)
- 3× AP first-team All-American (2021, 2024, 2025)
- 3× USBWA first-team All-American (2021, 2024, 2025)
- 3× WBCA All-American (2021, 2024, 2025)
- 3× John R. Wooden Award first-team All-American (2021, 2024, 2025)
- CSC first-team Academic All-American (2024)
- 2× Nancy Lieberman Award (2021, 2025)
- USBWA National Co-Freshman of the Year (2021)
- WBCA Co-Freshman of the Year (2021)
- Big East Scholar-Athlete of the Year (2024)
- 3× Big East Player of the Year (2021, 2024, 2025)
- 3× First-team All-Big East (2021, 2024, 2025)
- Big East Freshman of the Year (2021)
- Big East All-Freshman Team (2021)
- 3× Big East tournament MOP (2021, 2024, 2025)
- 3× Big East All-Tournament Team (2021, 2024, 2025)
- 4× Big East All-Academic Team (2021, 2022, 2024, 2025)
- 4× NCAA tournament Final Four All-Tournament Team (2021, 2022, 2024, 2025)
- NCAA tournament Spokane 4 Region MOP (2025)
  - Spokane 4 Region All-Tournament Team (2025)
- NCAA tournament Portland 3 Region MOP (2024)
  - Portland 3 Region All-Tournament Team (2024)
- NCAA tournament Bridgeport Region MOP (2022)
  - Bridgeport Region All-Tournament Team (2022)
- NCAA tournament River Walk Region MOP (2021)
  - River Walk Region All-Tournament Team (2021)
- espnW Player of the Year (2021)
- espnW Freshman of the Year (2021)
- 3× ESPN first-team All-American (2021, (Note: No All-American team selected in the 2021–22 and 2022–23 seasons.) 2024, 2025)
- The Sporting News first-team All-American (2025) (Note: The Sporting News did not select an All-American team prior to the 2023–24 season.)
- The Sporting News second-team All-American (2024)
- Sports Illustrated first-team All-American (2021) (Note: No All-American team selected following the 2021–22 season.)
- Allstate NACDA Good Works Team (2025)
- 6× USBWA National Player of the Week
- 4× USBWA National Freshman of the Week
- 11× Big East Player of the Week
- 8× Big East Freshman of the Week
- 7× Big East Weekly Honor Roll
- 4× UConn Dean's list (Undergraduate)
- 6× Director of Athletics' Honor Roll
- UConn's Huskies of Honor (2025)

=== High School ===
- ESPN National Champion (2020)
- Minnesota 4A State Champion (2019) (Note: Made it to the 2020 State Championship, but the game was canceled due to COVID-19.)
- Prep Girls Hoops AAU Player of the Year (2019)
- MaxPreps Female Athlete of the Year (2020)
- Gatorade Female Athlete of the Year (2020)
- Gatorade National Player of the Year (2020)
- Morgan Wootten Player of the Year (2020)
- Naismith Prep Player of the Year (2020)
- MaxPreps National Player of the Year (2020)
- Minnesota Miss Basketball (2020)
- WBCA Player of the Year (2020)
- USA Today National Player of the Year (2020)
- 2× USA Today Minnesota Player of the Year (2019, 2020)
- 3× Gatorade Minnesota Player of the Year (2018–2020)
- Star Tribune All-Metro Female Athlete of the Year (2020)
- 3× Star Tribune Metro Player of the Year (2018–2020)
- McDonald's All-American (2020)
- Jordan Brand Classic All-American (2020)
- SLAM All-American (2020)
- 2× MaxPreps first-team All-American (2019, 2020)
- MaxPreps fifth-team All-American (2018)
- 2× Naismith first-team All-American (2019, 2020)
- Naismith All-American honorable mention (2018)
- First-team USA Today All-USA High School Basketball Team (2020)
- Second-team USA Today All-USA High School Basketball Team (2019)
- 5× Academic All-State (2016–2020)
- 4× First-team USA Today All-USA Minnesota High School Basketball Team (2017–2020)
- 4× Minnesota Girls Basketball Coaches Association (MGBCA) All-State (2017–2020)
- 4× Minnesota 4A All-State Tournament Team (2016–2019 (Note: No All-State Tournament Team was selected in 2020 due to the tournament's cancellation because of COVID-19.))
- Hopkins High School Athena Award (2020)
- 4× Minneapolis Star Tribune first-team All-Metro (2017–2020)
- MaxPreps 51st Greatest High School Athlete of the 21st Century (2025)
