= Adam Damlip =

English Protestant martyr

Adam Damlip, also known as George Bucker (executed 1540s), was an English Protestant martyr during the reign of Henry VIII.

After a visit to Rome, he became disillusioned with the Roman Catholic Church and in Calais, which was then ruled by England, he was converted to some Protestant doctrines. He began to preach in Calais, but attracted enemies and was committed to Marshalsea Prison, London, where he met the Protestant John Marbeck. He was later returned to Calais, but due to a general pardon he could not be executed for heresy. Although he was condemned on the scaffold as a sower of seditious doctrine, he was executed as a traitor against the king because he had accepted a coin from Cardinal Pole for his travel expenses.

He was hanged, drawn and quartered in Calais; the site is still visible today.
