= Gabriela Bucher =

President and CEO, Fund for Global Human Rights

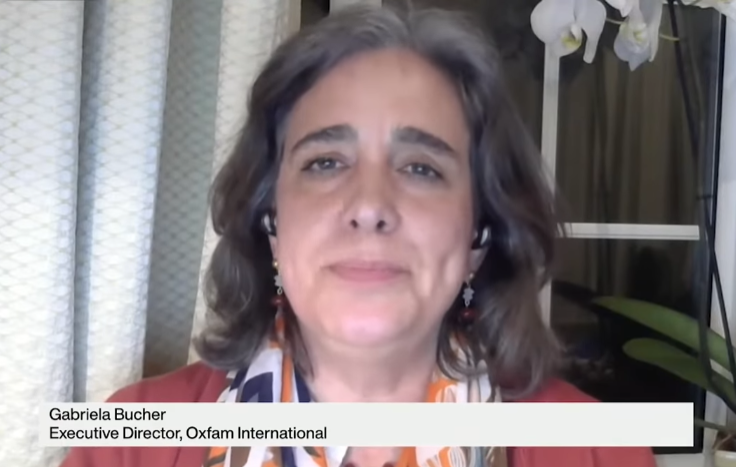
- Speaking at the 2021 World Economic Forum
- Education: Universidad de los Andes; École des Hautes Études en Sciences Sociales
- Occupation(s): International development and social justice advocate

Gabriela Bucher is a Colombian international development and social justice advocate. She served as Executive Director of Oxfam International. In 2023, she was named president and CEO of the Fund for Global Human Rights.

== Career ==
Bucher worked at Plan International for 20 years. From 2006 to 2017, she was CEO of Fundación Plan, a division of Plan International operating in Colombia. In 2017, she was promoted to Chief Operating Officer of the organization's headquarters in London. At the time of her promotion, El Tiempo wrote she was considered one of the most important development leaders in Colombia.

In 2020, Bucher was appointed Executive Director of Oxfam International. She was the first Colombian to lead the organization. Under her leadership, Oxfam advocated for reducing wealth inequality global, increasing taxes on the wealthy and corporations, and ensuring an equitable global recovery from the COVID-19 pandemic. Bucher warned that the pandemic was intensifying global inequality, and criticized food corporation for reporting high profits as rates of acute hunger grew in the wake of the pandemic. She also advocated for fairer global distribution of COVID-19 vaccines, and called for a one-time 99% tax on the world's billionaires to fund expanded production of vaccines for the poor. In 2022, Bucher spoke at a World Economic Forum panel on the future of global taxation. In 2023, Bucher promoted an Oxfam report that called for raising minimum taxes for the wealthiest individuals, as well as raising taxes on large energy and food corporations. In 2023, Bucher was included in Forbes Colombia's list of 100 Powerful Women for her work at Oxfam.

In 2023, Bucher left Oxfam to join the Fund for Global Human Rights, a grantmaking intermediary, as its second president and CEO.

== Personal life ==
Bucher grew up in Cali, Colombia. She earned her undergraduate degree at Universidad de los Andes and a postgraduate degree in history at the École des Hautes Études en Sciences Sociales. As of 2023, Bucher resided in London.
