= 2020–21 BYU Cougars women's basketball team =

Intercollegiate basketball season

2020–21 BYU Cougars women's basketball

NCAA tournament, second round
- Conference: West Coast Conference
- Record: 19–6 (13–3 WCC)
- Head coach: Jeff Judkins (20th season)
- Assistant coaches: Ray Stewart (10th season); Melanie Day (2nd season); Lee Cummard (2nd season)
- Home arena: Marriott Center

2020–21 West Coast Conference women's basketball standings
	Conf.				Overall
Team	W		L	PCT	W		L	PCT
No. 14 Gonzaga†	16	–	1	.941	23	–	4	.852
BYU	13	–	3	.813	19	–	5	.792
San Diego	9	–	5	.643	12	–	7	.632
San Francisco	10	–	7	.588	16	–	11	.593
Santa Clara	9	–	8	.529	14	–	11	.560
Portland	9	–	8	.529	14	–	13	.519
Pacific	9	–	9	.500	11	–	11	.500
Saint Mary's	4	–	14	.222	7	–	19	.269
Loyola Marymount	4	–	14	.222	7	–	19	.269
Pepperdine	2	–	16	.111	5	–	18	.217
† 2021 WCC tournament winner San Diego suspended their season on February 25, 2021; Rankings from AP poll

The 2020–21 BYU Cougars women's basketball team represented Brigham Young University during the 2020–21 NCAA Division I women's basketball season. It was head coach Jeff Judkins's twentieth season at BYU. The Cougars, members of the West Coast Conference, played their home games at the Marriott Center.

== Before the season ==
=== Departures ===
Name	Number	Pos.	Height	Year	Hometown	Notes
Brenna Chase Drollinger	1	G	5'8	Senior	Thornton, Colorado	Graduated
Shalae Salmon	3	F	6'3	Senior	Porirua, New Zealand	Graduated
Babalu Ugwu	14	F	6'0"	Sophomore	Judai, Sao Paulo, Brazil	Transferred to Utah Valley
Khaedin Taito	21	G	5'11"	Senior	Hastings, New Zealand	Graduated
Jasmine Moody	33	F	6'2	RS Senior	Honolulu, Hawaii	Graduated

=== Newcomers ===
Name	Number	Pos.	Height	Year	Hometown	Notes
Megan Stevenson	1	F	6'0	Freshman	Purcellville, Virginia	
Kate Vorwaller	3	G	5'9	Freshman	Salt Lake City, Utah	
Tegan Graham	10	G	6'0	Graduate	Wellington, New Zealand	Transferred from Colgate
Kayla Belles-Lee	42	F	6'3"	Junior	Ithaca, Michigan	Transferred from Michigan State

== 2020–21 media ==
=== BYU Sports Media ===
All Cougars home games are being shown on BYUtv or the BYUtv App. Conference road games are being shown on WCC Network. All remaining non-conference road games are also being streamed. Streaming partners for those games can be found on the schedule.

== Roster ==
2020–21 BYU Cougars women's basketball team
Players
Coaches

Pos.	#	Name	Height	Year	Previous school	Hometown
F	1	Megan Stevenson	6 ft 0 in (1.83 m)	Fr	Loudoun Valley	Purcellville, VA
G	2	Shaylee Gonzales	5 ft 10 in (1.78 m)	RS So	Mesquite	Gilbert, AZ
G	3	Kate Vorwaller	5 ft 9 in (1.75 m)	Fr	Skyline	Salt Lake City, UT
G	4	Devry Millett	5 ft 10 in (1.78 m)	So	Folsom	Folsom, CA
G	5	Maria Albiero	5 ft 8 in (1.73 m)	Sr	Neusa Christian	Londrina, Brazil
G	10	Tegan Graham	6 ft 0 in (1.83 m)		Wellington Girls; Colgate	Wellington, New Zealand
F	11	Kaylee Smiler	5 ft 8 in (1.73 m)	RS So	Melville	Hamilton, New Zealand
F	12	Lauren Gustin	5 ft 8 in (1.73 m)	RS So	Salem Hills; Salt Lake CC; Idaho	Salem, UT
G	13	Paisley Harding	5 ft 9 in (1.75 m)	Sr	Glacier Peak	Everett, WA
F	15	Malli Perri	6 ft 5 in (1.96 m)	RS Jr	Pleasant Grove	Pleasant Grove, UT
F	21	Tahlia White	6 ft 0 in (1.83 m)	Fr	Mountain View	Orem, UT
C	22	Sara Hamson	6 ft 7 in (2.01 m)	Sr	Pleasant Grove	Lindon, UT
F	32	Signe Glantz	6 ft 1 in (1.85 m)	Jr	Lulea Gymnasie Skola	Östersund, Sweden
F	34	Kyra Beckman	6 ft 2 in (1.88 m)	RS Fr	Snohomish	Snohomish, WA
F	42	Kayla Belles-Lee	6 ft 3 in (1.91 m)	Jr	Ithaca; Michigan State	Ithaca, MI

Head coach

- Jeff Judkins (Utah)

Assistant coach(es)

- Ray Stewart (Utah Valley)
- Melanie Day (BYU)
- Lee Cummard (BYU)
- Xojian Harry- Director of Operations (BYU)

Legend

- (C) Team captain
- (S) Suspended
- (I) Ineligible
- (W) Walk-on
- Injured
- Current redshirt

Roster

== Schedule ==
Date time, TV	Rank^{#}	Opponent^{#}	Result	Record	Site city, state
Non-conference regular season
11/27/2020*; 7:30 pm, Streaming Video Provider		vs. LSU; South Point Shootout	W 67–51	1–0	South Point Arena and Equestrian Center; Las Vegas, NV
11/28/2020*; 7:30 pm, Streaming Video Provider		vs. Washington; South Point Shootout	L 48–77	1–1	South Point Arena and Equestrian Center; Las Vegas, NV
12/01/2020*; 3:00 pm, WAC DN		at Dixie State	Canceled due to COVID-19 issues		Burns Arena; St. George, UT
12/07/2020*; 6:00 pm, MW Net		at Utah State	W 87–66	2–1	Dee Glen Smith Spectrum; Logan, UT
12/10/2020*; 2:00 pm, BYUtv.org		Montana State	W 72–58	3–1	Marriott Center; Provo, UT
12/12/2020*; 12:00 pm, BYUtv		Boise State	Canceled due to COVID-19 issues		Marriott Center; Provo, UT
12/15/2020*; 3:00 pm, BYUtv		Utah Valley	Canceled due to COVID-19 issues		Marriott Center; Provo, UT
12/18/2020*; 12:00 pm, Pluto TV		at Southern Utah	W 84–74	4–1	America First Event Center; Cedar City, UT
WCC regular season
12/28/2020; 2:00 pm, BYUtv		San Francisco	W 70–46	5–1 (1–0)	Marriott Center; Provo, UT
12/30/2020; 2:00 pm, BYUtv		Santa Clara	W 76–50	6–1 (2–0)	Marriott Center; Provo, UT
01/04/2021; 7:00 pm, WCC Net		at San Diego	L 56–58	6–2 (2–1)	Jenny Craig Pavilion; San Diego, CA
01/07/2021; 7:00 pm, WCC Net		at Loyola Marymount	W 71–57	7–2 (3–1)	Gersten Pavilion; Los Angeles, CA
01/09/2021; 6:00 pm, WCC Net		at Pepperdine	Postponed due to COVID-19 issues		Firestone Fieldhouse; Malibu, CA
01/14/2021; 6:00 pm, BYUtv		Saint Mary's	W 80–63	8–2 (4–1)	Marriott Center; Provo, UT
01/16/2021; 2:00 pm, BYUtv.org		Pacific	Postponed due to COVID-19 issues		Marriott Center; Provo, UT
01/21/2021; 7:00 pm, WCC Net		at Portland	Canceled due to COVID-19 issues		Chiles Center; Portland, OR
01/23/2021; 7:00 pm, SWX; WCC Net		at No. 20 Gonzaga	Postponed due to COVID-19 issues		McCarthey Athletic Center; Spokane, WA
01/26/2021; 2:00 pm, BYUtv.org		Pacific moved from Jan. 16	W 81–60	9–2 (5–1)	Marriott Center; Provo, UT
01/30/2021; 7:00 pm, BYUtv		San Diego	Canceled due to COVID-19 issues		Marriott Center; Provo, UT
02/02/2021; 7:00 pm, SWX; WCC Net		at No. 19 Gonzaga moved from Jan. 23	L 56–63	9–3 (5–2)	McCarthey Athletic Center; Spokane, WA
02/04/2021; 5:00 pm, BYUtv.org		Pepperdine	W 75–61	10–3 (6–2)	Marriott Center; Provo, UT
02/06/2021; 2:00 pm, BYUtv		Loyola Marymount	W 69–50	11–3 (7–2)	Marriott Center; Provo, UT
02/09/2021; 6:00 pm, WCC Net		at Pepperdine moved from Jan. 9	W 57–43	12–3 (8–2)	Firestone Fieldhouse; Malibu, CA
02/11/2021; 8:00 pm, WCC Net		at Pacific	W 62–52	13–3 (9–2)	Alex G. Spanos Center; Stockton, CA
02/13/2021; 2:00 pm, WCC Net		at Saint Mary's	W 79–61	14–3 (10–2)	University Credit Union Pavilion; Moraga, CA
02/18/2021; 6:00 pm, BYUtv.org		No. 16 Gonzaga	W 61–56	15–3 (11–2)	Marriott Center; Provo, UT
02/20/2021; 2:00 pm, BYUtv		Portland	W 75–68	16–3 (12–2)	Marriott Center; Provo, UT
02/25/2021; 7:00 pm, WCC Net		at Santa Clara	W 66–63	17–3 (13–2)	Leavey Center; Santa Clara, CA
02/27/2021; 1:00 pm, WCC Net		at San Francisco	L 72–86	17–4 (13–3)	The Sobrato Center; San Francisco, CA
WCC Tournament
03/08/2021; 3:00 pm, BYUtv	(2)	vs. (3) San Francisco; Semifinal	W 85–55	18–4	Orleans Arena; Paradise, NV
03/09/2021; 2:00 pm, ESPNU	(2)	vs. (1) No. 16 Gonzaga; Championship	L 42–43	18–5	Orleans Arena; Paradise, NV
NCAA tournament
03/22/2021*; 10:00 am, ESPNU	(11)	vs. (6) No. 21 Rutgers; 1st Round	W 69–66	19–5	Strahan Arena; San Marcos, TX
03/24/2021*; 5:00 pm, ESPNU	(11)	vs. (3) No. 11 Arizona; 2nd Round	L 46–52	19–6	UTSA Convocation Center; San Antonio, TX
*Non-conference game. ^{#}Rankings from AP Poll. (#) Tournament seedings in parentheses. All times are in Mountain.

- Conference games at Portland and home vs. San Diego were postponed by COVID-19 protocols and were not able to be rescheduled before the WCC Tournament.
- Non-conference games against Dixie State, Boise State, and Utah Valley were canceled due to the COVID-19 pandemic. Meanwhile UT Martin was replaced by Washington for the second South Point Shootout game. Finally Southern Utah was added to the schedule after both teams had their games against Utah Valley canceled by the pandemic protocols. The addition of Southern Utah allowed BYU to play against former Cougar Liz Graves in her final season. Graves had spent her first two seasons at BYU.

== Game summaries ==
=== LSU ===
Broadcasters: Garrett Walvoord

Series History: First Meeting
Starting Lineups:

- BYU: Shaylee Gonzales, Maria Albiero, Lauren Gustin, Paisley Harding, Sara Hamson
- LSU: Awa Trasi, Jailin Cherry, Khayla Pointer, Karli Seay, Faustine Aifuwa

Streaming Video Provider

Nov. 27
5:30 p.m. PST

Recap

BYU Cougars 67, LSU Lady Tigers 51
Scoring by quarter: 12–10, 22–10, 16–18, 17–13
Pts: Shaylee Gonzales 30; Rebs: Lauren Gustin 14; Asts: Maria Albiero 4	Pts: Awa Trasi 15; Rebs: Faustine Aifuwa 10; Asts: Khayla Pointer 5

South Point Arena and Equestrian Center
Las Vegas, NV
Attendance: 0
Referees: Bryan Enterline, Amy Krommenhoek, Felicity Willis

=== Washington ===
Broadcasters: Gary Hill Jr.

Series History: Washington leads series 7–5
Starting Lineups:

- Washington: Quay Miller, Tameiya Sadler, Jayda Noble, Haley Van Dyke, Khayla Rooks
- BYU: Shaylee Gonzales, Maria Albiero, Lauren Gustin, Paisley Harding, Sara Hamson

Streaming Video Provider

Nov. 28
6:30 p.m. PST

Recap

Washington Huskies 77, BYU Cougars 48
Scoring by quarter: 22–14, 15–17, 24–10, 16–7
Pts: Tameiya Sadler 23; Rebs: Tameiya Sadler 7 Asts: Khayla Rooks 4	Pts: Lauren Gustin 13; Rebs: Lauren Gustin 10; Asts: Lauren Gustin 3

South Point Arena and Equestrian Center
Las Vegas, NV
Attendance: 0
Referees: Bryan Enterline, Amy Krommenhoek, Felicity Willis

=== Utah State ===
Broadcasters: Jaden Johnson

Series History: BYU leads series 37–4
Starting Lineups:

- BYU: Shaylee Gonzales, Maria Albiero, Lauren Gustin, Paisley Harding, Sara Hamson
- Utah State: Faith Brantley, Kama Kamakawiwo'ole, Meagan Mendazona, Jessica Chatman, Emmie Harris

MW Net

Dec. 7
6 p.m. MST

Recap

BYU Cougars 87, Utah State Aggies 66
Scoring by quarter: 23–10, 19–14, 23–28, 22–14
Pts: Shaylee Gonzales 27; Rebs: Lauren Gustin 17; Asts: Shaylee Gonzales, Tegan Graham, Lauren Gustin, Paisley Harding 3	Pts: Jessica Chatman 16; Rebs: Jessica Chatman 7 Asts: Faith Brantley 3

Dee Glen Smith Spectrum
Logan, UT
Attendance: 425
Referees: Lisa Jones, Tiffany Bird, Michol Murray

=== Montana State ===
Broadcasters: Spencer Linton, Kristen Kozlowski & Kiki Solano

Series History: BYU leads series 13–4
Starting Lineups:

- Montana State: Darian White, Tori Martell, Kola Bad Bear, Katelynn Limardo, Madison Jackson
- BYU: Shaylee Gonzales, Maria Albiero, Lauren Gustin, Paisley Harding, Sara Hamson

byutv.org

Dec. 10
2 p.m. MST

Recap

Montana State Bobcats 58, BYU Cougars 72
Scoring by quarter: 9–25, 9–15, 19–20, 21–12
Pts: Darian White 16; Rebs: Kola Bad Bear, Katelynn Limardo 6 Asts: Ava Ranson, Katelynn Limardo 1	Pts: Shaylee Gonzales 18; Rebs: Lauren Gustin 5 Asts: Paisley Harding 6

Marriott Center
Provo, UT
Attendance: 125
Referees: Shantae Anderson, Felicity Willis, Michol Murray

=== Southern Utah ===
Broadcasters: Kylee Young & Joshua Price

Series History: BYU leads series 18–4
Starting Lineups:

- BYU: Shaylee Gonzales, Maria Albiero, Lauren Gustin, Paisley Harding, Sara Hamson
- Southern Utah: Margarita Satini, Liz Graves, Cherita Daugherty, Madelyn Eaton, Darri Frandsen

Pluto TV

Dec. 18
12 p.m. MST

Recap

BYU Cougars 84, Southern Utah T–Birds 74
Scoring by quarter: 20–17, 15–22, 25–13, 24–22
Pts: Shaylee Gonzales 26; Rebs: Lauren Gustin 13; Asts: Maria Albiero 7	Pts: Liz Graves 34; Rebs: Liz Graves 10; Asts: Darri Frandsen 3

America First Event Center
Cedar City, UT
Attendance: 254
Referees: Clarke Stevens, Rick Thorne, Infini Robinson

=== San Francisco ===
Broadcasters: Spencer Linton & Kristen Kozlowski

Series History: BYU leads series 20–6
Starting Lineups:

- San Francisco: Amalie Langer, Lucie Hoskova, Joanna Krimili, Lucija Kostic, Abby Rathbun
- BYU: Shaylee Gonzales, Maria Albiero, Lauren Gustin, Paisley Harding, Sara Hamson

BYUtv

Dec. 28
2 p.m. MST

Recap

San Francisco Dons 46, BYU Cougars 70
Scoring by quarter: 12–18, 11–13, 13–27, 10–12
Pts: Lucie Hoskova, Joanna Krimili 10; Rebs: Marta Galic 6 Asts: Abby Rathbun 3	Pts: Shaylee Gonzales 16; Rebs: Lauren Gustin 17; Asts: Shaylee Gonzales 6

Marriott Center
Provo, UT
Attendance: 145
Referees: Nicole Leon, Tyler Trimble, Robert Scofield

=== Santa Clara ===
Broadcasters: Spencer Linton, Kristen Kozlowski & Jason Shepherd

Series History: BYU leads series 19–2
Starting Lineups:

- Santa Clara: Lexie Pritchard, Ashlee Maldonado, Ashlyn Herlihy, Lindsey VanAllen, Danja Stafford
- BYU: Shaylee Gonzales, Maria Albiero, Lauren Gustin, Paisley Harding, Sara Hamson

BYUtv

Dec. 30
2 p.m. MST

Recap

Santa Clara Broncos 50, BYU Cougars 76
Scoring by quarter: 8–24, 10–14, 16–23, 16–15
Pts: Lindsey VanAllen 13; Rebs: Merle Wiehl 5 Asts: Ashlee Maldonado 5	Pts: Shaylee Gonzales 20; Rebs: Lauren Gustin 11; Asts: Maria Albiero 10

Marriott Center
Provo, UT
Attendance: 137
Referees: Corey Long, Cheryl Flores, Melissa Barlow

=== San Diego ===
Broadcasters: Seth Smith

Series History: BYU leads series 13–7
Starting Lineups:

- BYU: Shaylee Gonzales, Maria Albiero, Lauren Gustin, Paisley Harding, Sara Hamson
- San Diego: Steph Gorman, Myah Pace, Jordyn Edwards, Kendall Bird, Sydney Hunter

WCC Net

Jan. 4
6 p.m. PST

Recap

BYU Cougars 56, San Diego Toreros 58
Scoring by quarter: 11–14, 10–9, 25–19, 10–16
Pts: Shaylee Gonzales 21; Rebs: Lauren Gustin 18; Asts: Shaylee Gonzales, Maria Albiero 3	Pts: Jordyn Edwards 13; Rebs: Jordyn Edwards, Sydney Hunter 5 Asts: Jordyn Edwards 5

Jenny Craig Pavilion
San Diego, CA
Attendance: 0
Referees: Kaili Kimura, Shelley Nakasone, Benny Luna

=== Loyola Marymount ===
Broadcasters: Brendan Craig & Gary Craig

Series History: BYU leads series 17–2
Starting Lineups:

- BYU: Shaylee Gonzales, Maria Albiero, Lauren Gustin, Paisley Harding, Sara Hamson
- Loyola Marymount: Ciera Ellington, Chelsey Gipson, Ariel Johnson, Khari Clark, Meghan Mandel

WCC Net

Jan. 7
6 p.m. PST

Recap

BYU Cougars 71, Loyola Marymount Lions 57
Scoring by quarter: 18–6, 15–13, 27–10, 11–28
Pts: Shaylee Gonzales 20; Rebs: Lauren Gustin 14; Asts: Shaylee Gonzales, Tegan Graham 5	Pts: Meghan Mandel 15; Rebs: Khari Clark, Meghan Mandel 8 Asts: Natalia Klimek 5

Leavey Center
Los Angeles, CA
Attendance: 0
Referees: Richard Waters, Esther Hsu, Cathi Cornell

=== Saint Mary's ===
Broadcasters: Spencer Linton, Kristen Kozlowski, & Kiki Solano

Series History: BYU leads series 11–10
Starting Lineups:

- Saint Mary's: Taycee Wedin, Madeline Holland, Tayla Dalton, Jade Kirisome, Brianna Simonich
- BYU: Shaylee Gonzales, Maria Albiero, Lauren Gustin, Paisley Harding, Sara Hamson

BYUtv

Jan. 14
6 p.m. MST

Recap

Saint Mary's Gaels 63, BYU Cougars 80
Scoring by quarter: 19–19, 14–22, 10–16, 20–23
Pts: Madeline Holland 14; Rebs: Brianna Simonich 11; Asts: Brianna Simonich 4	Pts: Paisley Harding 20; Rebs: Lauren Gustin 16; Asts: Shaylee Gonzales 6

Marriott Center
Provo, UT
Attendance: 163
Referees: Ashley Ellis, Alecia Murray, Michol Murray

=== Pacific ===
Broadcasters: Spencer Linton, Kristen Kozlowski & Jason Shepherd

Series History: BYU leads series 15–4
Starting Lineups:

- Pacific: Brooklyn McDavid, Erica Adams, Valerie Higgins, Lianna Tillman, Sam Ashby
- BYU: Shaylee Gonzales, Maria Albiero, Lauren Gustin, Paisley Harding, Sara Hamson

byutv.org

Jan. 26
2 p.m. MST

Recap

Pacific Tigers 60, BYU Cougars 81
Scoring by quarter: 9–29, 12–18, 20–14, 19–20
Pts: Valerie Higgins 18; Rebs: Valerie Higgins 10; Asts: Lianna Tillman 4	Pts: Shaylee Gonzales 23; Rebs: Sara Hamson 9 Asts: Shaylee Gonzales, Maria Albiero 6

Marriott Center
Provo, UT
Attendance: 127
Referees: Kenneth Nash, Tiffany Bird, Robert Scofield

=== Gonzaga ===
Broadcasters: Rob Jesselson, Stephanie Hawk-Freeman, & Joe McHale

Series History: Gonzaga leads series 17–12
Starting Lineups:

- BYU: Shaylee Gonzales, Maria Albiero, Lauren Gustin, Paisley Harding, Sara Hamson
- Gonzaga: Jenn Wirth, LeeAnne Wirth, Kayleigh Truong, Cierra Walker, Jill Townsend

SWX
WCC Net

Feb. 2
6 p.m. PST

Recap

BYU Cougars 56, #19/18 Gonzaga Bulldogs 63
Scoring by quarter: 13–14, 9–20, 12–10, 22–19
Pts: Paisley Harding 17; Rebs: Lauren Gustin 10; Asts: Maria Albiero 4	Pts: Jill Townsend 18; Rebs: Jenn Wirth 7 Asts: Kaylynne Truong 3

McCarthey Athletic Center
Spokane, WA
Attendance: 0
Referees: Alecia Murray, Benny Luna, Michol Murray

=== Pepperdine ===
Broadcasters: Spencer Linton, Kristen Kozlowski & Kiki Solano

Series History: BYU leads series 22–3
Starting Lineups:

- Pepperdine: Malia Bambrick, Jayda Ruffus-Milner, Cheyenne Givens, Monique Andriuolo, Jayla Ruffus-Milner
- BYU: Shaylee Gonzales, Maria Albiero, Lauren Gustin, Paisley Harding, Sara Hamson

byutv.org

Feb. 4
5 p.m. MST

Recap

Pepperdine Waves 61, BYU Cougars 75
Scoring by quarter: 12–16, 16–18, 13–19, 20–22
Pts: Monique Andriuolo 17; Rebs: Jayda Ruffus-Milner, Monique Andriuolo, Jayla Ruffus-Milner 5 Asts: Jayda Ruffus-Milner 3	Pts: Lauren Gustin 27; Rebs: Lauren Gustin 20; Asts: Paisley Harding 5

Marriott Center
Provo, UT
Attendance: 159
Referees: Marc Merrit, Brian Wood, Brenda Pantoja

=== Loyola Marymount ===
Broadcasters: Dave McCann, Kristen Kozlowski, & Jason Shepherd

Series History: BYU leads series 18–2
Starting Lineups:

- Loyola Marymount: Chelsey Gipson, Nicole Rodriguez, Ariel Johnson, Khari Clark, Meghan Mandel
- BYU: Shaylee Gonzales, Maria Albiero, Lauren Gustin, Paisley Harding, Sara Hamson

BYUtv

Feb. 6
2 p.m. MST

Recap

Loyola Marymount Lions 50, BYU Cougars 69
Scoring by quarter: 14–19, 9–18, 13–21, 14–11
Pts: Chelsey Gipson 19; Rebs: Ciera Ellington 7 Asts: Ciera Ellington, Nicole Rodriguez, Ariel Johnson 2	Pts: Paisley Harding 14; Rebs: Shaylee Gonzales 8 Asts: Shaylee Gonzales 6

Marriott Center
Provo, UT
Attendance: 83
Referees: Charles Gonzalez, Tyler Trimble, InFini Robinson

=== Pepperdine ===
Broadcasters: Darren Preston

Series History: BYU leads series 23–3
Starting Lineups:

- BYU: Shaylee Gonzales, Maria Albiero, Lauren Gustin, Paisley Harding, Sara Hamson
- Pepperdine: Malia Bambrick, Jayda Ruffus-Milner, Cheyenne Givens, Monique Andriuolo, Jayla Ruffus-Milner

WCC Net

Feb. 9
5 p.m. PST

Recap

BYU Cougars 57, Pepperdine Waves 43
Scoring by quarter: 22–8, 13–16, 10–17, 12–2
Pts: Paisley Harding 20; Rebs: Lauren Gustni 10; Asts: Paisley Harding 5	Pts: Cheyenne Givens 16; Rebs: Monique Andriuolo 6 Asts: Jayda Ruffus-Milner 2

Firestone Fieldhouse
Malibu, CA
Attendance: 0
Referees: Melissa Barlow, Cathi Cornell, Kimberly Hobbs

=== Pacific ===
Broadcasters: Don Gubbins

Series History: BYU leads series 16–4
Starting Lineups:

- BYU: Shaylee Gonzales, Maria Albiero, Lauren Gustin, Paisley Harding, Sara Hamson
- Pacific: Brooklyn McDavid, Erica Adams, Valerie Higgins, Lianna Tillman, Sam Ashby

WCC Net

Feb. 11
7 p.m. PST

Recap

BYU Cougars 62, Pacific Tigers 52
Scoring by quarter: 22–9, 20–11, 17–15, 6–17
Pts: Shaylee Gonzales, Paisley Harding 14; Rebs: Lauren Gustin 13; Asts: Shaylee Gonzales, Kaylee Smiler 4	Pts: Kaylin Randhawa 12; Rebs: Valerie Higgins 8 Asts: Valerie Higgins 4

Alex G. Spanos Center
Stockton, CA
Attendance: 0
Referees: Lorena Ahumada, Nicole Leon, Michael Price

=== Saint Mary's ===
Broadcasters: Ben Ross

Series History: BYU leads series 12–10
Starting Lineups:

- BYU: Shaylee Gonzales, Maria Albiero, Lauren Gustin, Paisley Harding, Sara Hamson
- Saint Mary's: Taycee Wedin, Madeline Holland, Tayla Dalton, Jade Kirisome, Brianna Simonich

WCC Net

Feb. 13
1 p.m. PST

Recap

BYU Cougars 79, Saint Mary's Gaels 61
Scoring by quarter: 23–18, 15–19, 28–16, 13–8
Pts: Paisley Harding 28; Rebs: Lauren Gustin 12; Asts: Maria Albiero, Tegan Graham 4	Pts: Taycee Wedin 17; Rebs: Brianna Simonich, Amy West 8 Asts: Leia Hanafin, Madeline Holland 4

McKeon Pavilion
Moraga, CA
Attendance: 0
Referees: Michol Murray, Kenneth Nash, Felecity Willis

=== Gonzaga ===
Broadcasters: Spencer Linton, Kristen Kozlowski, & Kiki Solano

Series History: Gonzaga leads series 18–12
Starting Lineups:

- Gonzaga: Jenn Wirth, LeeAnne Wirth, Kayleigh Truong, Cierra Walker, Jill Townsend
- BYU: Shaylee Gonzales, Maria Albiero, Lauren Gustin, Paisley Harding, Sara Hamson

byutv.org

Feb. 18
6 p.m. MST

Recap

#16/16 Gonzaga Bulldogs 56, BYU Cougars 61
Scoring by quarter: 12–12, 19–18, 12–17, 13–14
Pts: Jenn Wirth 18; Rebs: Jenn Wirth 10; Asts: Kayleigh Truong, Kaylynne Troung 3	Pts: Shaylee Gonzales 16; Rebs: Lauren Gustin 10; Asts: Shaylee Gonzales 7

Marriott Center
Provo, UT
Attendance: 153
Referees: Ryan Holmes, Chris Rastatter, Winston Stith

=== Portland ===
Broadcasters: Spencer Linton, Kristen Kozlowski, & Kiki Solano

Series History: BYU leads series 25–5
Starting Lineups:

- Portland: Keeley Frawley, Emme Shearer, Haylee Andrews, Alex Fowler, Maddie Muhlheim
- BYU: Shaylee Gonzales, Maria Albiero, Lauren Gustin, Paisley Harding, Sara Hamson

BYUtv

Feb. 20
2 p.m. MST

Recap

Portland Pilots 68, BYU Cougars 75
Scoring by quarter: 14–20, 17–13, 16–24, 21–18
Pts: Alex Fowler 21; Rebs: Haylee Andrews 6 Asts: Haylee Andrews 12	Pts: Shaylee Gonzales 26; Rebs: Lauren Gustin 16; Asts: Paisley Harding 6

Marriott Center
Provo, UT
Attendance: 127
Referees: Michol Murray, Tyler Trimble, Sean Martin

=== Santa Clara ===
Broadcasters: Joe Ritzo

Series History: BYU leads series 20–2
Starting Lineups:

- BYU: Shaylee Gonzales, Maria Albiero, Lauren Gustin, Paisley Harding, Sara Hamson
- Santa Clara: Lexie Pritchard, Merle Wiehl, Ashlee Maldonado, Ashlyn Herlihy, Lindsey VanAllen

WCC Net

Feb. 25
6:05 p.m. PST

Recap

BYU Cougars 66, Santa Clara Broncos 63
Scoring by quarter: 12–17, 12–21, 22–11, 20–14
Pts: Shaylee Gonzales 20; Rebs: Lauren Gustin 13; Asts: Paisley Harding 10	Pts: Lindsey VanAllen 17; Rebs: Ashlyn Herlihy 7 Asts: Merle Wiehl 6

Leavey Center
Santa Clara, CA
Attendance: 0
Referees: Benny Luna, Darren Krzesnik, Lorena Ahumada

=== San Francisco ===
Broadcasters: George Devine

Series History: BYU leads series 21–6
Starting Lineups:

- BYU: Shaylee Gonzales, Maria Albiero, Lauren Gustin, Paisley Harding, Sara Hamson
- San Francisco: Amalie Langer, Lucie Hoskova, Ioanna Krimili, Lucija Kostic, Abby Rathbun

WCC Net

Feb. 27
12:11 p.m. PST

Recap

BYU Cougars 72, San Francisco Dons 86
Scoring by quarter: 12–18, 16–21, 22–19, 22–28
Pts: Shaylee Gonzales 25; Rebs: Lauren Gustin 13; Asts: Paisley Harding 5	Pts: Ioanna Krimili 27; Rebs: Marta Galic, Lucija Kostic 6 Asts: Jessica McDowell-White 6

The Sobrato Center
San Francisco, CA
Attendance: 0
Referees: Melissa Barlow, Kimberely Hobbs, Johnny Mendez

=== WCC Semifinal: San Francisco ===
Broadcasters: Spencer Linton & Kristen Kozlowski

Series History: BYU leads series 21–7
Starting Lineups:

- San Francisco: Amalie Langer, Lucie Hoskova, Ioanna Krimili, Lucija Kostic, Abby Rathbun
- BYU: Shaylee Gonzales, Maria Albiero, Lauren Gustin, Paisley Harding, Sara Hamson

BYUtv

Mar. 8
2:05 p.m. PST

Recap

San Francisco Dons 55, BYU Cougars 85
Scoring by quarter: 19–15, 3–19, 10–30, 23–21
Pts: Ioanna Krimili 21; Rebs: Lucie Hoskova, Lucija Kostic 5 Asts: Lucie Hoskova, Abby Rathbun 2	Pts: Paisley Harding 23; Rebs: Lauren Gustin 10; Asts: Shaylee Gonzales 7

Orleans Arena
Paradise, NV
Attendance: 0
Referees: Melissa Barlow, Benny Luna, Brian Woods

=== WCC Championship: Gonzaga ===
Broadcasters: Paul Sunderland & Andraya Carter (ESPNU)
Greg Wrubell & Kristen Kozlowski (BYU Radio 107.9 FM)

Series History: Gonzaga leads series 18–13
Starting Lineups:

- BYU: Shaylee Gonzales, Maria Albiero, Lauren Gustin, Paisley Harding, Sara Hamson
- Gonzaga: Jenn Wirth, LeeAnne Wirth, Kayleigh Truong, Cierra Walker, Jill Townsend

ESPNU

Mar. 9
1:02 p.m. PST

Recap

BYU Cougars 42, #16/16 Gonzaga Bulldogs 43
Scoring by quarter: 10–8, 12–5, 14–14, 6–16
Pts: Shaylee Gonzales 13; Rebs: Lauren Gustin 13; Asts: Paisley Harding 3	Pts: Yvonne Ejim 13; Rebs: Yvonne Ejim 9 Asts: Jenn Wirth 3

Orleans Arena
Paradise, NV
Attendance: 0
Referees: Brenda Pantoja, In'Fini Robinson, Tiffany Bird

=== NCAA 1st Round: Rutgers ===
Broadcasters: Kevin Fitzgerald & Christy Thomaskutty (ESPNU)
Jason Shepherd & Kristen Kozlowski (BYU Radio 107.9 FM)

Series History: First Meeting
Starting Lineups:

- BYU: Shaylee Gonzales, Maria Albiero, Lauren Gustin, Paisley Harding, Sara Hamson
- Rutgers: Diamond Johnson, Arella Guirantes, Mael Gilles, Tyia Singleton, Kate Martin

ESPNU

Mar. 22
11 a.m. CST

Recap

BYU Cougars 69, #21/23 Rutgers Scarlet Knights 66
Scoring by quarter: 10–12, 14–18, 19–20, 26–16
Pts: Paisley Harding 28; Rebs: Lauren Gustin 11; Asts: Tegan Graham 5	Pts: Arella Guirantes 30; Rebs: Tyia Singleton 9 Asts: Arella Guirantes 3

Strahan Arena
San Marcos, TX
Attendance: N/A
Referees: Dee Kanter, Brian Woods, Karleena Tobin

=== NCAA 2nd Round: Arizona ===
Broadcasters: Tiffany Greene & Steffi Sorensen
Jason Shepherd & Kristen Kozlowski (BYU Radio 107.9 FM)

Series History: BYU leads 8–5
Starting Lineups:

- BYU: Shaylee Gonzales, Maria Albiero, Lauren Gustin, Paisley Harding, Sara Hamson
- Arizona:

ESPNU

Mar. 24
6 p.m. CST

BYU Cougars vs. #11/11 Arizona Wildcats

UTSA Convocation Center
San Antonio, TX

== Conference Honors ==
- Shaylee Gonzales, Sara Hamson, and Paisley Johnson Harding were selected to the 2020–21 All-WCC Preseason Women's Basketball Team.
- On November 30 Shaylee Gonzales was awarded the WCC Player of the Week.
- On January 18 Lauren Gustin was awarded the WCC Player of the Week.

== Rankings ==
2020–21 NCAA Division I women's basketball rankings

Regular season polls
Poll	Pre- Season	Week 2	Week 3	Week 4	Week 5	Week 6	Week 7	Week 8	Week 9	Week 10	Week 11	Week 12	Week 13	Week 14	Week 15	Week 16	Final
AP	(NR)	(NR)	(NR)	(NR)	(NR)	(NR)	(NR)	(NR)	(NR)	(NR)	(NR)	(NR)	(NR)	(RV)	(NR)	(NR)	
Coaches	(RV)	No Poll Released	(NR)	(NR)	(NR)	(NR)	(NR)	(NR)	(NR)	(NR)	(NR)	(NR)	(NR)	(NR)	(NR)	(NR)	

Legend
	Increase in ranking
	Decrease in ranking
	No change
(RV)	Received votes
(NR)	Not ranked
