= Kaylynne Truong =

Vietnamese-American professional basketball player (born 2001)

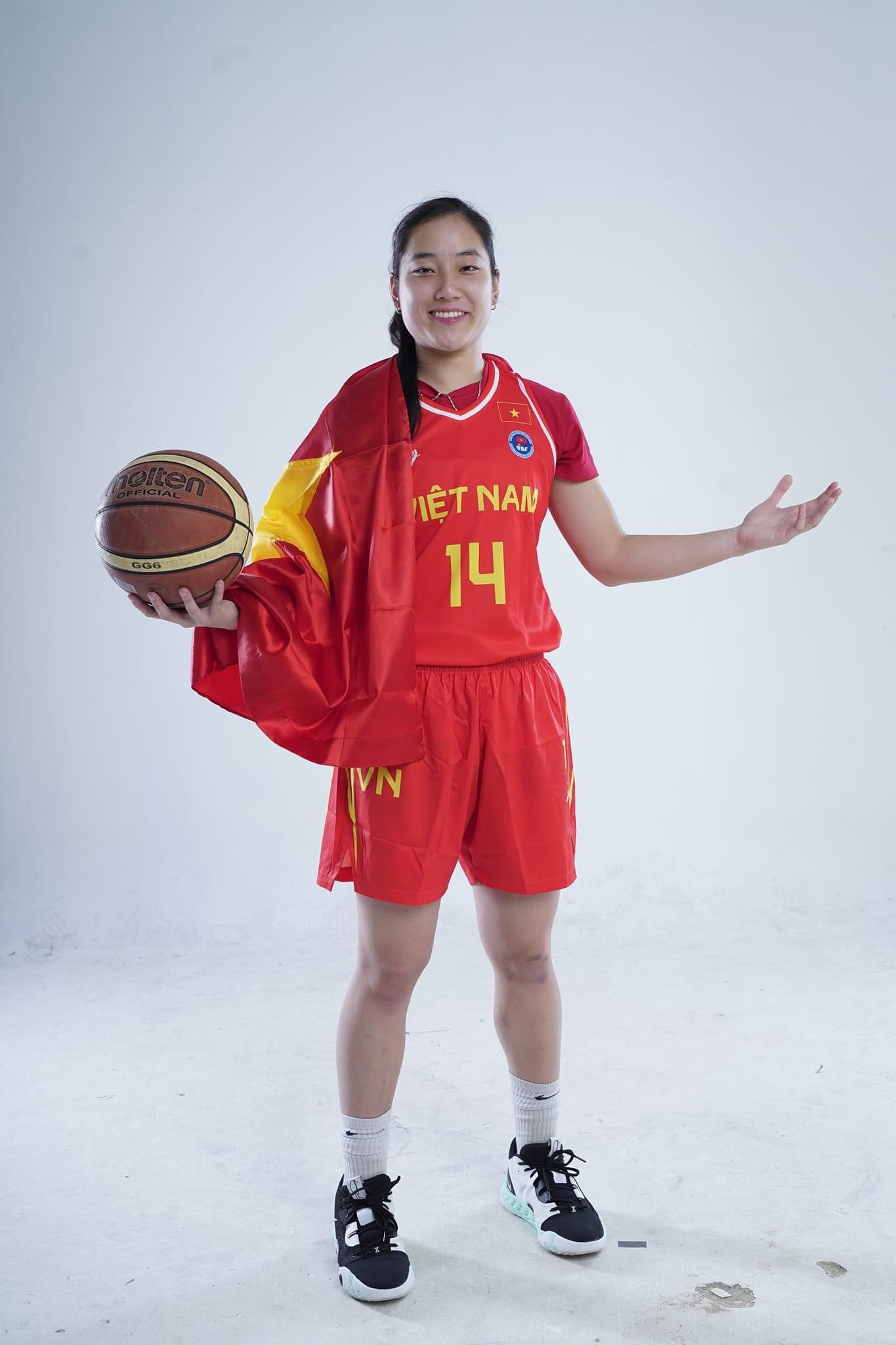
- Truong wearing the Vietnamese national uniform kit.

AZS Poznań
- Position: Guard
- League: Basket Liga Kobiet

Personal information
- Born: July 10, 2001 (age 25) Houston, Texas, U.S.
- Listed height: 5 ft 8 in (1.73 m)

Career information
- High school: Jersey Village (Houston, Texas)
- College: Gonzaga (2019–2024)
- WNBA draft: 2024: Second round, 21st overall pick
- Drafted by: Washington Mystics

Career history
- 2024–2025: PAOK
- 2025–: AZS Poznań

Career highlights
- WCC Player of the Year (2023); 2 First-team All-WCC (2023, 2024)
- Stats at WNBA.com
- Stats at Basketball Reference
Medals
Women's basketball
Representing Vietnam
SEA Games
Silver medal – second place	2021 SEA Games
Gold medal – first place	2023 SEA Games	3x3 basketball

Kaylynne Truong (Vietnamese: Trương Thảo Vy; born July 10, 2001) is a Vietnamese-American basketball player who plays for AZS Poznań of the Basket Liga Kobiet. She was drafted by the Washington Mystics in the 2024 WNBA draft. She is also a player for the Vietnam women's national team. She played college basketball for the Gonzaga Bulldogs.

== Early life ==
Truong was born in Houston, Texas, on July 10, 2001. She is of Vietnamese heritage. Her parents are Katherine Nguyen and Truong Man. Her father played basketball and has been her coach since she was 5 years old. She has a brother named Jonathan and a twin sister named Kayleigh Truong (Vietnamese: Trương Thảo My), who is also a basketball player.

While attending Gonzaga University, she majored in kinesiology.

== High school career ==
Truong attended Jersey Village High School in Houston, where she played four years of basketball under head coach Tamara Collier. She averaged 19.5 points, 4.2 rebounds, 4.5 assists, and 3.2 steals. She was voted 28th in ESPN's best American point guards at the high school level.

During her senior season in 2019, she helped the team to a 33–3 record. She was named the District 17-6A Most Valuable Player.

== College career ==
Truong played at Gonzaga University with her twin sister for 5 years, from 2019 to 2024, under head coach Lisa Fortier. She started as a reserve player for her first 3 seasons and became a starter in the last 2 years. Throughout her career at Gonzaga, she scored 282 3-pointers and started in 78 games. She was two-time All-West Coast Conference (WCC) First Team member and ranks second in program history in career assists with 623.

In the 2022–23 season, she achieved a career-high of 15.9 points per game and a 42.5% 3-point scoring rate. She was the WCC Player of the Year and an honorable mention AP All-American.

Despite her sister being injured in 2023, the twins chose to return to Gonzaga for their 5th year in 2024, citing that "Gonzaga is a really good school, and [she] love[s] playing with everyone on this team."

In the 2023–24 season, she started in 36 matches for the Bulldogs and achieved career highs of 11.4 points per game, 5.8 assists, 2.3 rebounds, and 1.3 steals. She had a 3-point scoring rate of 42.1%. During the season, Truong totaled 411 points, 208 assists, 84 rebounds, and 48 steals. She helped the Zags go 32–4 in the season, including a perfect 16–0 run in WCC regular season play, landing as No. 4 seed in the NCAA tournament.

She scored 13 points with eight assists in the playoffs match against Loyola Marymount, with the Zags winning 71–47.

In 2024, she helped Gonzaga reach the Sweet 16 round of the playoffs.

== Professional career ==
Truong was selected in the second round, as the 21st overall pick of the 2024 WNBA draft by the Washington Mystics. Truong was the first American of Vietnamese descent to be selected in the WNBA draft. She was the eighth Gonzaga player to be chosen in the history of the WNBA draft. On May 12, 2024, Truong was waived by the Mystics.

Truong spent the 2024–25 with Greek Basketball League club PAOK, where she averaged 14.4 points and 6.0 assists per league game.

On July 4, 2025, she signed with Polish side AZS Poznań.

== National team career ==
Truong plays for the Vietnamese national women's basketball team. In 2022, she helped Vietnam win the historic silver medal at the 2021 SEA Games. Then in 2023, she helped Vietnam win the historic gold medal at the 2023 SEA Games, in the 3x3 basketball.

== Career statistics ==
Legend
GP	Games played	GS	Games started	MPG	Minutes per game	RPG	Rebounds per game
APG	Assists per game	SPG	Steals per game	BPG	Blocks per game	PPG	Points per game
TO	Turnovers per game	FG%	Field-goal percentage	3P%	3-point field-goal percentage	FT%	Free-throw percentage
**Bold**	Career best	°	League leader

=== College ===
Year	Team	GP	GS	MPG	FG%	3P%	FT%	RPG	APG	SPG	BPG	TO	PPG
2019–20	Gonzaga	31	0	14.4	**42.6**	**43.9**	60.9	1.3	1.7	0.8	0.0	1.1	3.6
2020–21	Gonzaga	27	1	17.3	35.5	33.3	86.7	1.9	3.0	0.7	0.0	1.7	4.1
2021–22	Gonzaga	34	7	24.3	39.8	35.1	**89.3**	2.1	3.4	1.0	0.1	2.1	10.4
2022–23	Gonzaga	33	33	**32.3**	41.4	42.2	83.5	**2.8**	5.0	**1.5**	0.1	**2.9**	**15.8**
2023–24	Gonzaga	**36**	**36**	30.0	42.2	42.1	79.2	2.3	**5.8**	1.3	0.0	2.4	11.4
**Career**		161	77	24.1	40.8	39.9	82.7	2.1	3.9	1.1	0.0	2.1	9.4
Statistics retrieved from Sports-Reference.
