= 2020–21 Gonzaga Bulldogs women's basketball team =

American college basketball season

2020–21 Gonzaga Bulldogs women's basketball

West Coast Conference regular season & tournament champions

NCAA tournament, first round
- Conference: West Coast Conference

Ranking
- Coaches: No. 14
- AP: No. 14
- Record: 23–4 (16–1 WCC)
- Head coach: Lisa Fortier (7th season)
- Assistant coaches: Jordan Green; Stacy Clinesmith; Craig Fortier
- Home arena: McCarthey Athletic Center

2020–21 West Coast Conference women's basketball standings
	Conf.				Overall
Team	W		L	PCT	W		L	PCT
No. 14 Gonzaga†	16	–	1	.941	23	–	4	.852
BYU	13	–	3	.813	19	–	5	.792
San Diego	9	–	5	.643	12	–	7	.632
San Francisco	10	–	7	.588	16	–	11	.593
Santa Clara	9	–	8	.529	14	–	11	.560
Portland	9	–	8	.529	14	–	13	.519
Pacific	9	–	9	.500	11	–	11	.500
Saint Mary's	4	–	14	.222	7	–	19	.269
Loyola Marymount	4	–	14	.222	7	–	19	.269
Pepperdine	2	–	16	.111	5	–	18	.217
† 2021 WCC tournament winner San Diego suspended their season on February 25, 2021; Rankings from AP poll

The 2020–21 Gonzaga Bulldogs women's basketball team represented Gonzaga University in the 2020–21 NCAA Division I women's basketball season. The Bulldogs (also informally referred to as the "Zags"), were members of the West Coast Conference. The Bulldogs, led by seventh year head coach Lisa Fortier, played their home games at the McCarthey Athletic Center on the university campus in Spokane, Washington.

== Roster ==
2020–21 Gonzaga Bulldogs women's basketball team
Players
Coaches

Pos.	#	Name	Height	Year	Previous school	Hometown
F	1	Anamaria Virjoghe	6 ft 5 in (1.96 m)	RS Jr	Voievodul Mercea; Northwest Christian	Târgoviște, Romania
G	2	Lily Scanlon	5 ft 9 in (1.75 m)	Fr	Lake Ginnindera Senior Secondary	Melbourne, Australia
F	3	Jenn Wirth	6 ft 3 in (1.91 m)	Sr	Seton Catholic	Chandler, AZ
F	4	LeeAnne Wirth	6 ft 3 in (1.91 m)	Sr	Seton Catholic	Chandler, AZ
G	5	Louise Forsyth	6 ft 0 in (1.83 m)	Sr	Brookswood Secondary	Langley, BC
F	10	Gillian Barfield	6 ft 1 in (1.85 m)	Sr	Phoenix Country Day School	Phoenix, AZ
G	11	Kayleigh Truong	5 ft 9 in (1.75 m)	So	Jersey Village	Houston, TX
F	12	Eliza Hollingsworth	6 ft 2 in (1.88 m)	RS Fr	St Leonard's College	Melbourne, Australia
G	13	Cierra Walker	5 ft 8 in (1.73 m)	RS Sr	Oregon City; Vanderbilt	Oregon City, OR
G	14	Kaylynne Truong	5 ft 8 in (1.73 m)	So	Jersey Village	Houston, TX
F	15	Yvonne Ejim	6 ft 1 in (1.85 m)	Fr	Edge School	Calgary, AB
G	24	McKayla Williams	6 ft 1 in (1.85 m)	Fr	Windward	Los Angeles, CA
G/F	24	Abby O'Connor	6 ft 0 in (1.83 m)	Sr	St. Joseph; Loyola–Chicago	South Bend, IN
G	32	Jill Townsend	5 ft 11 in (1.8 m)	Sr	Okanogan	Okanogan, WA
F	33	Melody Kempton	6 ft 1 in (1.85 m)	Jr	Post Falls	Post Falls, ID
G	44	Kylee Griffen	6 ft 2 in (1.88 m)	RS So	Lake Stevens	Marysville, WA

Head coach

- Lisa Fortier (Cal State Monterey)

Assistant coach(es)

- Jordan Green (George Fox)
- Stacy Clinesmith (UC Santa Barbara)
- Craig Fortier (Cal State Monterey)

Legend

- (C) Team captain
- (S) Suspended
- (I) Ineligible
- (W) Walk-on
- Injured
- Current redshirt

Roster

== Schedule ==
Date time, TV	Rank^{#}	Opponent^{#}	Result	Record	Site (attendance) city, state
Non-conference regular season
Nov 28, 2020*; 3:00 pm	No. 21	vs. Oklahoma; Bad Boy Mowers Crossover Classic	Canceled due to Covid-19 issues		Sanford Pentagon; Sioux Falls, SD
Nov 29, 2020*; 12:00 pm, FloHoops	No. 21	vs. South Carolina; Bad Boy Mowers Crossover Classic	L 72–77	0–1	Sanford Pentagon (0); Sioux Falls, SD
Nov 30, 2020*; 12:00 pm, FloHoops	No. 21	vs. South Dakota; Bad Boy Mowers Crossover Classic	W 54–50	1–1	Sanford Pentagon (0); Sioux Falls, SD
Dec 6, 2020*; 12:00 pm	No. 18	at South Dakota State	L 72–75 ^{OT}	1–2	Frost Arena (583); Brookings, SD
Dec 8, 2020*; 5:30 pm, MW Net	No. 25	at Wyoming	W 89–50	2–2	Arena-Auditorium (1,003); Laramie, WY
Dec 13, 2020*; 2:00 pm, SWX	No. 25	Montana	W 58–51	3–2	McCarthey Athletic Center (0); Spokane, WA
Dec 20, 2020*; 2:30 pm	No. 25	vs. Eastern Michigan; Holiday Hoops Classic	W 77–68	4–2	South Point Arena (0); Las Vegas, NV
Dec 21, 2020*; 2:30 pm	No. 25	vs. North Alabama; Holiday Hoops Classic	W 87–57	5–2	South Point Arena (0); Las Vegas, NV
WCC regular season
Dec 28, 2020; 12:00 pm, WCC Net	No. 23	at Loyola Marymount	W 65–62	6–2 (1–0)	Gersten Pavilion (0); Los Angeles, CA
Dec 30, 2020; 5:00 pm, WCC Net	No. 23	at Pepperdine	W 58–42	7–2 (2–0)	Firestone Fieldhouse (0); Malibu, CA
Jan 2, 2021; 2:00 pm, WCC Net	No. 23	Saint Mary's	W 69–37	8–2 (3–0)	McCarthey Athletic Center (0); Spokane, WA
Jan 4, 2021; 6:00 pm, SWX	No. 23	Pacific	W 79–59	9–2 (4–0)	McCarthey Athletic Center (0); Spokane, WA
Jan 9, 2021; 2:00 pm, SWX	No. 23	Portland	W 75–43	10–2 (5–0)	McCarthey Athletic Center (0); Spokane, WA
Jan 14, 2021; 6:00 pm, WCC Net	No. 19	at Santa Clara	W 71–52	11–2 (6–0)	Kaiser Permanente Arena (0); Santa Cruz, CA
Jan 16, 2021; 12:00 pm, SWX	No. 19	at San Francisco	W 76–52	12–2 (7–0)	War Memorial Gymnasium (0); San Francisco, CA
Jan 21, 2021; 6:00 pm, SWX	No. 18	San Diego	Canceled due to Covid-19 issues		McCarthey Athletic Center (0); Spokane, WA
Jan 23, 2021; 2:00 pm, SWX	No. 18	BYU	PPD due to Covid-19 issues to 2/2		McCarthey Athletic Center (0); Spokane, WA
Jan 24, 2021; 4:00 pm, WCC Net	No. 19	at Portland	W 79–61	13–2 (8–0)	Chiles Center (0); Portland, OR
Jan 28, 2021; 7:00 pm, WCC Net	No. 17	at Pacific	W 77–65	14–2 (9–0)	Alex G. Spanos Center (0); Stockton, CA
Jan 30, 2021; 1:00 pm, WCC Net	No. 17	at Saint Mary's	W 79–52	15–2 (10–0)	University Credit Union Pavilion (0); Moraga, CA
Feb 2, 2021; 6:00 pm, SWX	No. 17	BYU	W 79–52	16–2 (11–0)	McCarthey Athletic Center (0); Spokane, WA
Feb 11, 2021; 6:00 pm, SWX	No. 16	San Francisco	W 79–66	17–2 (12–0)	McCarthey Athletic Center (0); Spokane, WA
Feb 13, 2021; 2:00 pm, SWX	No. 16	Santa Clara	W 67–50	18–2 (13–0)	McCarthey Athletic Center (0); Spokane, WA
Feb 18, 2021; 5:00 pm, BYUtv	No. 16	at BYU	L 56–61	18–3 (13–1)	Marriott Center (153); Provo, UT
Feb 20, 2021; 2:00 pm, ROOT	No. 16	at San Diego	W 69–47	19–3 (14–1)	Jenny Craig Pavilion (0); San Diego, CA
Feb 25, 2021; 7:30 pm, SWX	No. 21	Pepperdine	W 95–49	20–3 (15–1)	McCarthey Athletic Center (0); Spokane, WA
Feb 27, 2021; 1:00 pm, SWX	No. 21	Loyola Marymount	W 77–39	21–3 (16–1)	McCarthey Athletic Center; Spokane, WA
WCC Women's Tournament
March 8, 2021; 11:00 am, Root Sports	(1) No. 16	(4) Santa Clara; Semifinals	W 72–62	22–3	Orleans Arena; Paradise, NV
March 9, 2021; 1:00 pm, ESPNU	(1) No. 16	(2) BYU; Championship game	W 43–42	23–3	Orleans Arena; Paradise, NV
NCAA Women's Tournament
March 22, 2021*; 1:00 pm, ESPN2	(5 M) No. 14	vs. (12 M) Belmont; First Round	L 59–64	23–4	Strahan Arena (0); San Marcos, TX
*Non-conference game. ^{#}Rankings from AP Poll. (#) Tournament seedings in parentheses. M=Mercado regional. All times are in Pacific Time.

== Rankings ==
2020–21 NCAA Division I women's basketball rankings

+ Regular season polls	Poll	Pre- Season	Week 2	Week 3	Week 4	Week 5	Week 6	Week 7	Week 8	Week 9	Week 10	Week 11	Week 12	Week 13	Week 14	Week 15	Week 16	Week 17	Week 18	Week 19	Final
AP	21																			N/A	
Coaches	20																				

Legend
	Increase in ranking
	Decrease in ranking
	No change
(RV)	Received votes
(NR)	Not ranked

^Coaches did not release a Week 2 poll.

== See also ==
- 2020–21 Gonzaga Bulldogs men's basketball team
