= West Coast Conference Women's Basketball Player of the Year =

American collegiate basketball award

WCC Women's Basketball Player of the Year
- Awarded for: the most outstanding basketball player in the West Coast Conference
- Country: United States
- First award: 1986
- Currently held by: Lauren Whittaker, Gonzaga

The West Coast Conference (WCC) Women's Basketball Player of the Year is a basketball award given to the most outstanding women's basketball player in the West Coast Conference. The award has been given ever since the conference first sponsored women's basketball in the 1985–86 season, when it was known as the West Coast Athletic Conference. There have been two ties in the history of the award. The first was in 2006–07 between Stephanie Hawk of Gonzaga and Amanda Rego of Santa Clara (coincidentally, players from the same two schools were involved in a tie for the WCC Men's Player of the Year Award that season). The second was in 2020–21, when BYU's Shaylee Gonzales and Gonzaga's Jenn Wirth shared honors. There have also been a total of five repeat winners, but only one—Courtney Vandersloot of Gonzaga—has been Player of the Year three times.

No one WCC school has dominated the total awards distribution over time. The overall leader is Gonzaga, with 14 awards; BYU is next with seven, while Saint Mary's and Santa Clara have five each. Of these schools, all but BYU, which joined the WCC in 2011 and left for the Big 12 Conference in 2023, have been WCC members throughout the conference's women's basketball history. Each current full WCC member except for Pacific and Seattle has at least one award. Pacific had been a charter member of what is now the WCC, but left in 1971, long before the conference sponsored women's sports, and did not return until 2013. Seattle left the WCC in 1980, well before the conference sponsored women's basketball, and did not return until 2025. Denver will join the conference in July 2026, followed by UC San Diego in July 2027.

As of the next 2026–27 WCC season, the only former WCC women's basketball members that failed to produce an award winner are Nevada, Oregon State, and Washington State. Nevada only participated in the conference's first two women's basketball seasons (1985–86 and 1986–87). Oregon State and Washington State, which also did not produce any winners, joined as associate members in 2024–25 after the collapse of their full-time home of the Pac-12 Conference. The 2025–26 season was their last as WCC affiliates; the Pac-12 will resume full operation in 2026–27 with seven new members, including Gonzaga.

== Key ==
†	Co-Players of the Year
*	Awarded a national player of the year award that same season: the Naismith College Player of the Year, the John R. Wooden Award, or Wade Trophy
Player (X)	Denotes the number of times the player has received the WCC Player of the Year award at that point

== Winners ==
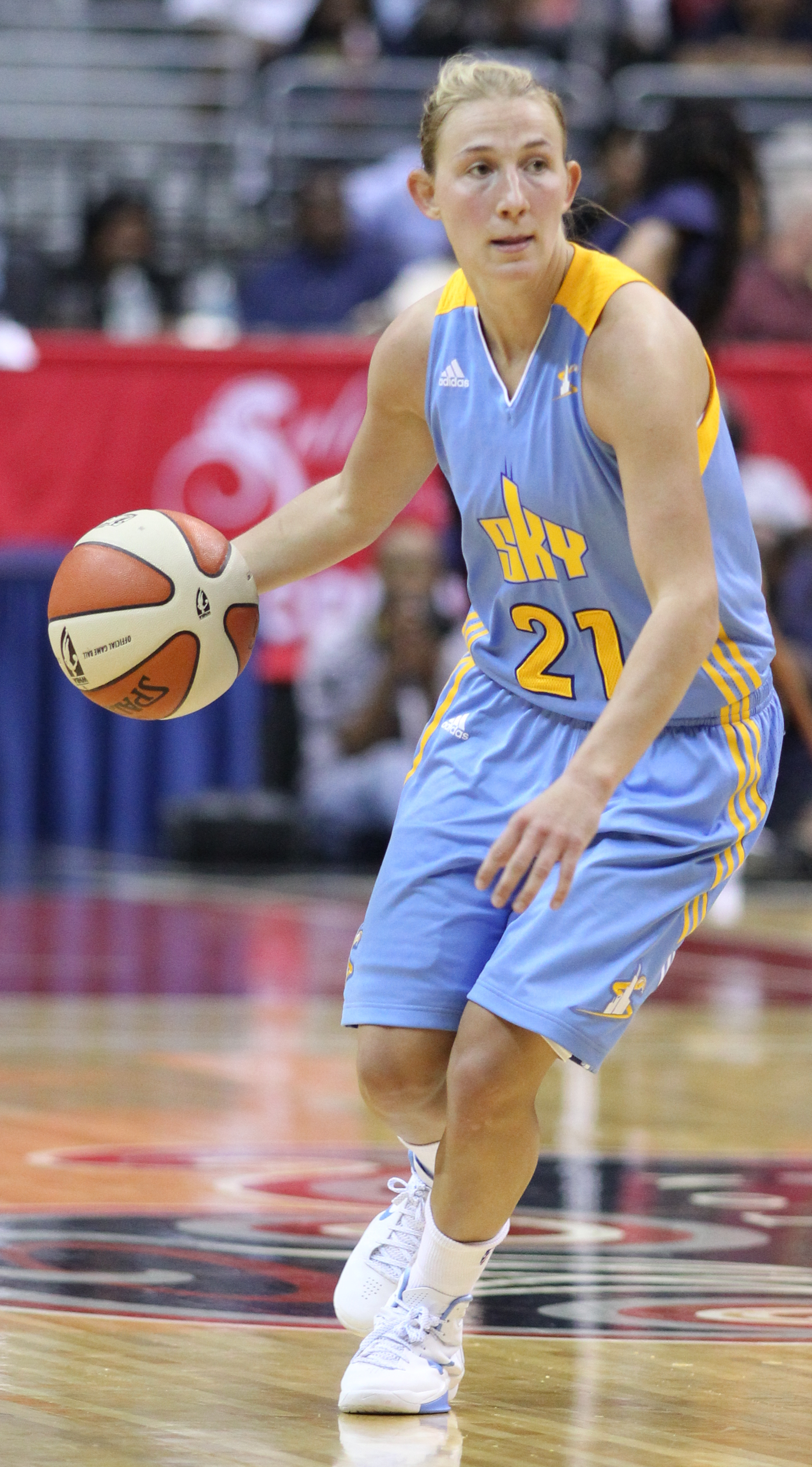
Gonzaga's Courtney Vandersloot, the only three-time winner, is also the first NCAA Division I player of either sex with 2,000 points and 1,000 assists in a career.

Season	Player	School	Position	Class	Reference
1985–86	Sonya Carter	U.S. International		Freshman	
1986–87	Teri Hunt	San Francisco		Senior	
1987–88	Dorinda Lindstrom	Santa Clara		Senior	
1988–89	Anja Bordt	Saint Mary's		Sophomore	
1989–90	Anja Bordt (2)	Saint Mary's		Junior	
1990–91	Melissa King	Santa Clara		Sophomore	
1991–92	Martha Sheldon	Portland		Senior	
1992–93	Melissa King (2)	Santa Clara		Senior	
1993–94	Christine Silvernall	Santa Clara		Senior	
1994–95	Amy Claboe	Portland		Senior	
1995–96	Laura Sale	Portland		Senior	
1996–97	Deana Lansing	Portland		Senior	
1997–98	Lisa Sacco	Santa Clara		Senior	
1998–99	Tracy Morris	Saint Mary's		Junior	
1999–2000	Rasheeda Clark	Pepperdine		Junior	
2000–01	Jermisha Dosty	Saint Mary's		Junior	
2001–02	Jerkisha Dosty	Saint Mary's		Senior	
2002–03	Tamara McDonald	Pepperdine		Senior	
2003–04	Kate Murray	Loyola Marymount		Senior	
2004–05	Shannon Matthews	Gonzaga		Senior	
2005–06	Michelle Cozad	Santa Clara		Senior	
2006–07^{†}	Stephanie Hawk	Gonzaga		Senior	
2006–07^{†}	Amanda Rego	San Diego		Junior	
2007–08	Heather Bowman	Gonzaga		Sophomore	
2008–09	Courtney Vandersloot	Gonzaga	PG	Sophomore	
2009–10	Courtney Vandersloot (2)	Gonzaga	PG	Junior	
2010–11	Courtney Vandersloot (3)	Gonzaga	PG	Senior	
2011–12	Kristen Riley	BYU	F	Senior	
2012–13	Taelor Karr	Gonzaga	SG	Senior	
2013–14	Jennifer Hamson	BYU	C	Senior	
2014–15	Morgan Bailey	BYU	F	Senior	
2015–16	Lexi Rydalch	BYU	G	Senior	
2016–17	Cassie Broadhead	BYU	G	Junior	
2017–18	Jill Barta	Gonzaga	F	Junior	
2018–19	Yasmine Robinson-Bacote	Pepperdine	F	Senior	
2019–20	Jill Townsend	Gonzaga	G	Junior	
2020–21^{†}	Shaylee Gonzales	BYU	G	Sophomore	
2020–21^{†}	Jenn Wirth	Gonzaga	F	Senior	
2021–22	Shaylee Gonzales (2)	BYU	G	Sophomore (Note: Due to COVID-19 disruptions, the NCAA ruled that the 2020–21 season would not count against the eligibility of any basketball player. BYU chose not to change the academic classifications for any of its returning basketball players, including Gonzales, in the 2021–22 season.)	
2022–23	Kaylynne Truong	Gonzaga	G	Senior	
2023–24	Yvonne Ejim	Gonzaga	F	Senior	
2024–25	Yvonne Ejim (2)	Gonzaga	F	5th-year senior (Note: Ejim, whose college career started in 2020–21, took advantage of the COVID-19 eligibility waiver to play in a fifth college season.)	
2025–26	Lauren Whittaker	Gonzaga	F	Freshman	

== Winners by school ==
Note: Years of entry for each school are the actual calendar years they joined the WCC and first played women's basketball in the conference. Because the basketball season spans two calendar years, the award years reflect the years in which each season ended. Schools that have left the WCC are highlighted in italics.

School	Joined WCC as full member	Joined WCC women's basketball	Winners	Years
Gonzaga (Note: Gonzaga will leave the WCC in July 2026 to join the Pac-12 Conference.)	1979	1987	14	2005, 2007^{†}, 2008, 2009, 2010, 2011, 2013, 2018, 2020, 2021^{†}, 2023, 2024, 2025, 2026
BYU	2011	2011 (Note: BYU left the WCC after the 2022–23 season to join the Big 12 Conference.)	7	2012, 2014, 2015, 2016, 2017, 2021^{†}, 2022
Santa Clara	1952	1985	6	1988, 1991, 1993, 1994, 1998, 2006
Saint Mary's	1952	1987	5	1989, 1990, 1999, 2001, 2002
Portland	1976	1987	4	1992, 1995, 1996, 1997
Pepperdine	1955	1985	3	2000, 2003, 2019
Loyola Marymount	1955	1985	1	2004
San Diego	1979	1985	1	2007^{†}
San Francisco	1952	1985	1	1987
U.S. International	—	1985 (Note: U.S. International joined the then-WCAC as an affiliate member in women's basketball when the conference began sponsoring the sport. It left the conference after the 1986–87 season. Within four years of its departure from the WCAC, the school went bankrupt and dropped intercollegiate athletics.)	1	1986
Nevada	—	1985 (Note: The University of Nevada, Reno (Nevada), which had left the then-WCAC in 1979 for the Big Sky Conference, rejoined the WCAC as a women's sports affiliate in 1985. The Wolf Pack left after the 1986–87 season for the Mountain West Athletic Conference, a women's-only conference that was absorbed by the Big Sky Conference and is not to be confused with the Wolf Pack's current all-sports home, the Mountain West Conference.)	0	—
Oregon State	—	2024 (Note: Oregon State University and Washington State University joined the WCC as multi-sport affiliates, including basketball, after the 2024 collapse of the Pac-12 Conference. They will leave after the 2025–26 season when the Pac-12 adds seven new members, one being current full WCC member Gonzaga.)	0	—
Pacific	1952/2013 (Note: The University of the Pacific was a founding member of the California Basketball Association, later the WCAC and now the WCC, in 1952. Pacific left the conference in 1971 to join its football team in the Pacific Coast Athletic Association, now the Big West Conference. After dropping football in 1995, Pacific rejoined the WCC in 2013.)	2013	0	—
Seattle	1971/2025 (Note: Seattle University left the conference in 1980, dropping first to the NAIA and later returning to the NCAA as a Division II member. The Redhawks returned to Division I in 2009 and rejoined the WCC in 2025.)	2025	0	—
Washington State	—	2024	0	—
