= 2021 West Coast Conference women's basketball tournament =

American women's collegiate postseason basketball tournament

- Classification: Division I
- Season: 2020–21
- Teams: 9
- Finals site: Orleans Arena; Paradise, Nevada
- Champions: Gonzaga (9th title)
- Winning coach: Lisa Fortier (3rd title)
- MVP: Jill Townsend (Gonzaga)
- Television: ESPNU/BYUtv

2020–21 West Coast Conference women's basketball standings
	Conf.				Overall
Team	W		L	PCT	W		L	PCT
No. 14 Gonzaga†	16	–	1	.941	23	–	4	.852
BYU	13	–	3	.813	19	–	5	.792
San Diego	9	–	5	.643	12	–	7	.632
San Francisco	10	–	7	.588	16	–	11	.593
Santa Clara	9	–	8	.529	14	–	11	.560
Portland	9	–	8	.529	14	–	13	.519
Pacific	9	–	9	.500	11	–	11	.500
Saint Mary's	4	–	14	.222	7	–	19	.269
Loyola Marymount	4	–	14	.222	7	–	19	.269
Pepperdine	2	–	16	.111	5	–	18	.217
† 2021 WCC tournament winner San Diego suspended their season on February 25, 2021; Rankings from AP poll

The 2021 West Coast Conference women's basketball tournament was played March 4–9, 2021, at Orleans Arena in Las Vegas. The winner received the conference's automatic bid to the NCAA women's basketball tournament.

== Seeds ==
All of the teams in the conference standings, except for San Diego, qualified for the tournament. San Diego cancelled their season after going 7–12, so they will not compete in the conference tournament. Teams are seeded based on the Ken Pomeroy Adjusted Conference Winning Percentage.

Seed	School	Conference	Overall*	Pomeroy AWP
1	Gonzaga	16–1	21–3	.917%
2	BYU	13–3	17–4	.808%
3	San Francisco	10–7	14–9	.587%
4	Santa Clara	9–8	13–10	.545%
5	Portland	9–8	12–11	.510%
6	Pacific	9–9	11–10	.503%
7	Saint Mary's	4–14	6–18	.225%
8	Loyola Marymount	4–14	5–18	.224%
9	Pepperdine	2–16	5–17	.112%

* Overall record at end of regular season.

== Venue ==
For the thirteenth consecutive year, the 2021 WCC Tournament was held in the Orleans Arena. When the Orleans Arena is set up for basketball games, the seating capacity is 7,471. The tournament is scheduled held at the Orleans Arena at least until 2022. The Orleans Arena is located at the 1,886 room Orleans Hotel and Casino about 1 mile west of the Las Vegas Strip. The tickets for the WCC Tournament typically sell out quickly. Due to the COVID-19 pandemic, no fans were permitted to attend the tournament for the year 2021.

== Schedule ==
Session	Game	Time	Matchup	Television
First round – Thursday March 4, 2021
1	1	12:30 PM	No. 8 Loyola Marymount 85 vs. No. 9 Pepperdine 73	BYUtv
Second round – Friday March 5, 2021
2	2	11:00 AM	No. 5 Portland 56 vs. No. 8 Loyola Marymount 74	BYUtv
2	3	2:00 PM	No. 6 Pacific 55 vs. No. 7 Saint Mary's 69	BYUtv
Quarterfinals – Saturday, March 6, 2021
3	4	11:00 AM	No. 4 Santa Clara 83 vs. No. 8 Loyola Marymount 68	BYUtv
3	5	2:00 PM	No. 3 San Francisco 69 vs. No. 7 St. Mary's 63	BYUtv
Semifinals – Monday, March 8, 2021
4	6	11:00 AM	No. 1 Gonzaga 72 vs. No. 4 Santa Clara 62	BYUtv
4	7	2:00 PM	No. 2 BYU 85 vs. No. 3 San Francisco 55	BYUtv
Championship – Tuesday, March 9, 2021
5	8	1:00 PM	No. 1 Gonzaga 43 vs. No. 2 BYU 42	ESPNU
Game times in PT. Rankings denote tournament seeding. *denotes overtime game

== Bracket ==
- All games except the championship will air on BYUtv and be simulcast on WCC Network and multiple RSN's: NBC Sports Bay Area, Fox Sports Prime Ticket, Fox Sports San Diego, and Root Sports. The championship will air on ESPNU.

Opening round Thursday, March 4
8	Loyola Marymount	85
9	Pepperdine	73

Second round Friday, March 5
5	Portland	56
8	Loyola Marymount	74
6	Pacific	55
7	Saint Mary's	69

Quarterfinals; Saturday, March 6
4	Santa Clara	83
8	Loyola Marymount	68
3	San Francisco	69
7	St. Mary's	63

Semifinals; Monday, March 8
1	Gonzaga	72
4	Santa Clara	62
2	BYU	85
3	San Francisco	55

Championship; Tuesday, March 9
1	Gonzaga	43
2	BYU	42

* denotes overtime game

== See also ==
- 2020-21 NCAA Division I women's basketball season
- West Coast Conference men's basketball tournament
- 2021 West Coast Conference men's basketball tournament
- West Coast Conference women's basketball tournament
