= Lisa Fortier =

American basketball coach (born 1981)

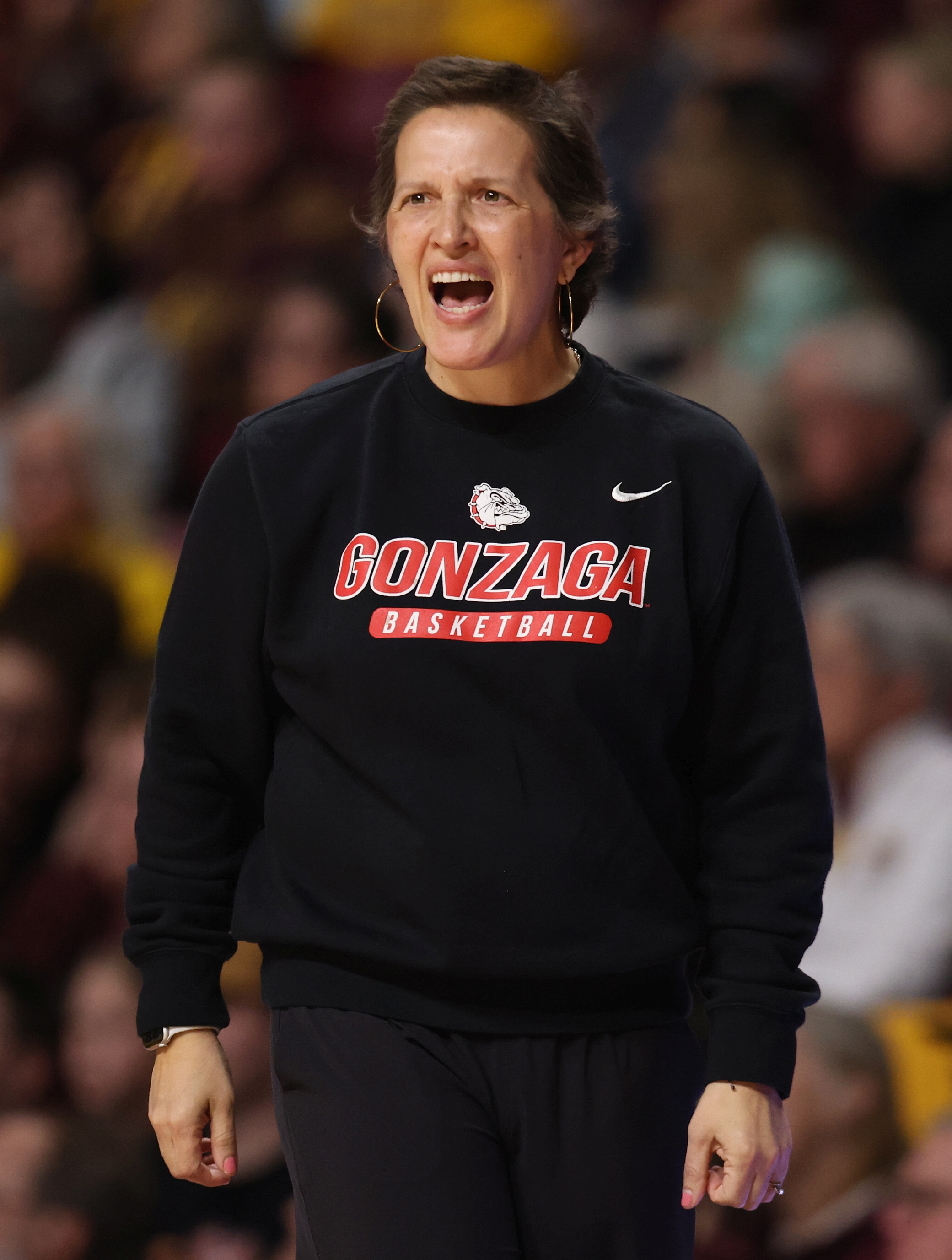
- Fortier in 2025

Current position
- Title: Head coach
- Team: Gonzaga
- Conference: Pac-12
- Record: 313–84 (.788)

Biographical details
- Born: April 5, 1981 (age 45); Grass Valley, California, U.S.

Playing career
- 2000–2002: Butte CC
- 2002–2004: Cal State Monterey Bay
- Position: Guard

Coaching career (HC unless noted)
- 2006–2007: Northern Colorado (asst.)
- 2007–2014: Gonzaga (asst.)
- 2014–present: Gonzaga

Administrative career (AD unless noted)
- 2004–2006: Gonzaga (coord. of basketball ops.)

Head coaching record
- Overall: 313–84 (.788)
- Tournaments: 4–8 (.333)

Accomplishments and honors

Awards
- Kathy Delaney-Smith Mid-Major Coach of the Year (2024); Maggie Dixon Award (2015); 7× West Coast Conference Coach of the Year (2015, 2017–2019, 2023–2025)

Lisa Mispley Fortier (born April 5, 1981) is an American basketball coach, currently the head coach of the women's basketball team at Gonzaga University.

== Early life and education ==
Fortier, born Lisa Mispley, is the oldest of three children to Bill and Tami Mispley. Fortier played basketball at Bear River High School before playing at both Butte Community College and California State University, Monterey Bay. At Cal State, she earned honorable mention All Cal-Pac Conference honors as a junior and was named to the NAIA Academic All-America list in 2003. She graduated Magna Cum Laude from Cal State, Monterey Bay, in 2004 with a B.A. in human communication. As a junior in 2002–03, Fortier averaged 12.1 points,. 4.1 rebounds, and 2.6 assists. As a senior in 2003–04, Fortier averaged 9.1 points, 3.7 rebounds, and 3.0 assists

== Coaching career ==
After two years as director of operations at Gonzaga, where she earned her master's degree in Sport and Athletic Administration in 2006, Fortier was an assistant coach at Northern Colorado in the 2006–07 season, then an assistant at Gonzaga from 2007 to 2014.

On April 14, 2014, Fortier was hired as Gonzaga women's basketball head coach, succeeding Kelly Graves, who accepted the head coaching position at Oregon the week before. Prior to becoming head coach, she was director of basketball operations for the Zags from 2004 to 2006 and assistant coach from 2007 to 2014, where she focused on the team's defense.

=== 2014–15 season ===
Fortier picked up her first win as a head coach with a 75–65 over the Dayton at the Kennel on November 16, 2014. The biggest highlight in non-conference play was the Eastern Washington game at Reese Court on December 3, 2014, where Elle Tinkle shot the game-winning jumper to lead the Zags to a 61–60 win. The Zags finished non-conference play with a 7–4 record.

Fortier picked up her first conference win as a head coach with a 78–62 over Jeff Judkins' BYU team at the Kennel on December 27, 2014. The biggest conference game came against the San Francisco Dons on February 7, 2015, at the Kennel, where the Zags won 91–84 in a 4-overtime thriller. The Zags clinched their 11th consecutive WCC regular-season crown on February 19, 2015, with an 80–72 win over the Saint Mary's Gaels. It also marked the first regular-season crown under Fortier's head coaching tenure. Gonzaga finished WCC regular-season play with a 16–2 record with losses against Pacific at home and San Diego on the road.

In the conference tournament, the Zags defeated the Loyola Marymount Lions 70–50 before losing to BYU 61–55. It was the Zags first non-appearance in the WCC Tournament Final game since the 2006 season. However, Gonzaga still received an #11 seed in the Spokane region, the second at-large bid in school history and the third in West Coast Conference play.

In the NCAA tournament, Fortier led the Zags to an 82–69 first round win over the George Washington Colonials and a 76–64 second round win over the Oregon State Beavers. Both games were held at the Gill Coliseum in Corvallis, Oregon. In the next game, the Zags led the Tennessee Volunteers 57–40 before Tennessee went on a 23–6 run to end regulation and force the game into overtime. The Zags season came to an end with a 73–69 overtime defeat to the Volunteers, in front of mostly Zags fans at the Spokane Arena.

On April 6, 2015, it was announced that she was named the Maggie Dixon Award Rookie Coach of the Year.

=== 2015–16 season ===
On June 18, 2015, the WBCA announced that Fortier would serve as part of the board of directors for the West region.

Fortier's Zags finished non-conference play with an 8–4 record. Their most significant non-conference game was against Wyoming, where the Zags won 61–57 in overtime. The Zags finished 10–8 in West Coast Conference play, finishing fifth place, ending Gonzaga's 11 consecutive West Coast Conference regular season titles, where the BYU Cougars women's basketball team won the outright title. Gonzaga earned its biggest conference win against #22 BYU in front of a sold-out crowd of 6,000 at the McCarthey Athletic Center, where the Zags outscored BYU 33–13 in the fourth quarter to defeat the WCC regular season champs 73–55 on Senior day. In the WCC tournament, the Zags lost to Santa Clara 59–58, their earliest tournament exit since the 2005–06 season.

The Zags received an at-large bid for the WNIT, their first since the 2007–08 season. They hosted the UC-Riverside Highlanders; the Big West regular season champs at the McCarthey Athletic Center on March 17, with the Zags defeating the Highlanders 88–54. The Zags next hosted Utah, losing to the Utes 92–77 to end their season at 19–14. The Zags finished one game shy of playing against their former coach, Kelly Graves and his Oregon Ducks, when his Ducks won 84–59 on the same night the Zags lost to the Utes.

=== 2016–17 season ===
The Zags finished non-conference play for the 2016–17 season with a 9–2 record, including upset victories over #11 ranked Stanford at their homecourt on November 18 and over Northwestern at the McCarthey Athletic Center on December 19. The Zags started the WCC conference schedule with losses to Pepperdine in Malibu and Pacific at home.

After losing their first two conference games, the Zags finished conference play winning 14 of the last 16 games. They won the WCC regular season title by defeating San Diego 62–57 on "Senior Night" in front of a sellout crowd of 6,000 at McCarthey Athletic Center. This marked the Zags' 12th regular season title and the second title in the Fortier era.

The Zags were rewarded with the #1 seed in the WCC tournament and they responded by defeating 9th seeded Pacific 91–59 on March 3, 4th seeded San Francisco 77–46 on March 6, and 3rd seeded Saint Mary's 86–75 to win their 7th WCC tournament title in program history and the first tournament title under Fortier. After winning the WCC tournament, the Zags were selected as an #11 seed to face Sherri Coale's Oklahoma Sooners at the Hec Edmundson Pavilion. This marked the ninth NCAA tournament appearance for the Zags and the second under Fortier. The Zags season ended with a 75–62 loss to Oklahoma to finish their season with a 26–7 record.

=== 2017–18 season ===
The Zags began their season with a 7–4 non-conference record. They finished regular season conference play with a 17–1 record, with the lone loss against St. Mary's at home. The Zags clinched their 13th WCC regular season title and the third under Fortier in the process.

The Zags won their 8th WCC tournament title and their second under Fortier with wins over Pepperdine, San Francisco, and San Diego. They were selected as the 13th seed in the Lexington region, and slated to face the 4th seeded Stanford Cardinal at Maples Pavilion. This marked the tenth NCAA tournament appearance for the Zags and the third under Fortier. The Zags' season ended with an 82–68 loss against Stanford to finish their season with a 27–6 record.

=== 2018–19 season ===
The Zags finished nonconference play with an 11–1 record with the lone loss coming against top-ranked Notre Dame at the Vancouver Showcase Thanksgiving Day. The biggest win in nonconference came against then #8 ranked Stanford Cardinals, where the Zags upset the Cardinals 79–73 at the Kennel on December 2. The Zags finished conference play with a 16–2 record, with both losses coming against BYU, both at Marriott Center on January 17 and the Kennel on February 16. The Zags clinched their 14th regular season WCC title and the fourth under Fortier. The Zags started off WCC Tournament play with a 78–77 win over St. Mary's on a game-winning shot by Zykera Rice at the buzzer. The Zags lost the championship game to BYU 82–68. However, the Zags received an at-large bid in the Albany, New York region, where they were selected as the #5 seed. This marked the eleventh NCAA tournament appearance for the Zags and the fourth under Fortier. In the first round, the Zags defeated Arkansas-Little Rock 68–51 on March 23 at Gill Coliseum in Corvallis, Oregon. It was their first NCAA tournament victory since 2015. The Zags suffered a 76–70 loss to Oregon State in the second round to finish the season with a 29–5 record.

==== USA Basketball assistant coach ====
In May 2019, Fortier was named one of the four assistant coaches for 2019 USA Basketball Junior National Team trials.

=== 2019–20 season ===
The Zags finished non-conference for the second year in a row with a 11–1 record, including winning the Gulf Coast Showcase tournament Thanksgiving weekend, and defeating #20 Missouri State on December 20. The lone loss came on November 17 at then #3 Stanford in overtime.
The Zags finished conference play with a 17–1 record, with the lone loss coming on February 8 at Saint Mary's, ending the Zags 21-games win streak, which was the longest in NCAA women's basketball at the time.
The Zags clinched their 15th regular season WCC title and the fifth under Fortier. The 28–2 record is the best start in Gonzaga women's basketball history. The Zags lost to the Portland Pilots 70–69 on March 9 in the semifinals of the WCC tournament at the Orleans Arena in Las Vegas after leading 29–9 towards the end of the first quarter. On March 12, it was announced that the Lady Zags basketball season abruptly comes to an end, due to the coronavirus issue and the cancellation of postseason play, including NCAA basketball tournaments. The Lady Zags finished the season with a 28–3 record.

=== 2020–21 season ===
The Zags finished non-conference play with a 5–2 record, with wins over the South Dakota Coyotes, Wyoming Cowgirls, Montana Grizzlies, Eastern Michigan Eagles, and North Alabama Lions, along with a near upset of then #1 ranked South Carolina Gamecocks, only losing to them by 7 and the South Dakota State Jackrabbits by 3. The Zags finished conference play with a 16–1 record, with the lone loss coming on February 18 at BYU. The Zags clinched their 16th regular season WCC title and the sixth under Fortier. The Zags defeated the Santa Clara Broncos 72–62 on March 8 and defeated the BYU Cougars 43–42 on a game-winning jump shot by Jill Townsend as time expired on March 9. It was the Zags' 9th WCC tournament title and their third under Fortier. The Zags were selected as the 5th seed, as they faced 12th seed Belmont at Strahan Coliseum in San Marcos, Texas. It marked the 12th NCAA appearance for the Zags and the fifth in the Fortier era. The Zags' season came to an end with a 64–59 defeat to the Belmont Bruins, as they ended their season with a 23–4 record.

=== 2021–22 season ===
The Zags finished nonconference play with a 9–4 record with three of the four losses decided by 4 points or less.
The Zags finished conference play in second place in the WCC with a 15–2 record, with both losses coming against the BYU Cougars at home and at the Marriott Center.
The Zags defeated the San Francisco Dons 69–55 on March 7 and the Zags upset #15 BYU Cougars 71–59 on March 8 to clinch their 10th tournament title and the 4th under Fortier. The Zags were selected as the 9th seed in the Wichita region. It was the 13th NCAA appearance for the Zags and the sixth in the Fortier era. The Zags defreated the Nebraska Cornhuskers 68–55 on March 18 at the KFC Yum! Center in Louisville to go to 27–6 on the season.
The Zags faced the Louisville Cardinals on March 20. The Zags lost to the Cardinals 68–59. The Zags finished their season with a 27–7 record.

=== 2022–23 season ===
The Zags finished nonconference play with a 10–2 record, including the biggest upset in program history defeating the #6 Louisville Cardinals, but losing to Marquette in the Bahamas and at Stanford. The Zags finished WCC play with a 17–1 record, with the lone loss coming at Santa Clara on February 2. The Zags won their 17th regular season conference title overall and the seventh under Fortier.
The Zags announced that they are going to have Kayleigh and Kaylynne Troung, Eliza Hollingsworth, and Brynna Maxwell back for the 2023–24 season during the pregame festivities against St. Mary's. The Zags defeated the BYU Cougars 79–64 on March 6 and ended up losing to Portland 64–60 on March 7 in the WCC tournament. The Zags were selected as the 9th seeded in the Seattle region 4, where they took on 8th seeded Ole Miss. It was the 14th appearance for the Zags and the seventh under Fortier. The Zags ended their season at 28–5 with a 71–48 loss to Ole Miss at Stanford.

=== 2023–24 season ===
The Zags finished non-conference play with a 13–2 record, including the biggest upset in program history of a 96–78 victory over then #3 Stanford Cardinals on December 3, 2023, and losses to Washington State on the road and Louisville at the Betty Chancellor classic in Katy, Texas. The Zags finished conference play undefeated for the first time in the Lisa Fortier era. It also marked the first undefeated conference season for the Zags since the 2010–11 season. The Zags clinched their 18th regular season conference title overall and the eighth under Fortier. During the starting lineup against the San Francisco Dons, The Zags announced that Yvonne Ejim will be returning for her fifth and final year of eligibility for the 2024–25 season. The Zags started off the WCC tournament with a 72–61 victory over the Pacific Tigers on March 11 to move to 30–2 on the season. The Zags lost to the Portland Pilots in the championship game on March 12 for the second consecutive year with a 67–66 loss to fall to 30–3 on the season. Despite the loss to Portland in the championship game, the Zags were selected the #4 seed in the NCAA tournament, which will be the first time they will host the tournament since the 2013 season and the first under Fortier's head coaching career. The Zags defeated the UC Irvine Anteaters 75–56 on March 23 to advance to the second round. The Zags defeated Utah 77–66 on March 25 to advance to the Sweet 16 in Portland. This marks the first Sweet 16 appearance for the Zags since 2015. The Zags season come to a close with a 69–47 defeat to Texas on March 29 at the Moda Center in Portland to finish their season at 32–4.
After the season, she was named by the women's basketball analytics website Her Hoop Stats as the inaugural recipient of the Kathy Delaney-Smith Mid-Major Coach of the Year Award, presented to the top Division I women's head coach outside the so-called "power conferences" (the Power Five conferences of college football plus the Big East Conference).

=== 2024–25 Season ===
The Zags finished nonconference with a 5-6 record.
The Zags finished tied for first place with the Portland Pilots in WCC play with a 17-3 record, winning 16 out of their last 17 games after starting conference play with a 1-2 record.
The Zags lost in the WCC tournament semifinals to the Oregon State Beavers 63-61 to fall to 22-10 on the season.
The Zags were selected as the #4 seed to host the UTSA Roadrunners on March 20, where they defeated the Roadrunners 67-51 to go to 23-10 on the season.
The Zags defeated top seeded Colorado Buffaloes 64-55 on March 23 at CU Events Center to go to 24-10 on the season.
The Zags season came to a close with a 82-77 overtime loss to the Minnesota Golden Gophers at Williams Arena on March 27 to finish the season with a 24-11 record.

=== 2025–26 season ===
The Zags finished nonconference with an 8-5 record.
The Zags finished their final season in the WCC in second place with a 14-4 conference record.
The Zags will go to their 16th NCAA appearance and the 9th under Fortier's head coaching tenure with victories over Santa Clara and Oregon State in their final WCC tournament.
The Zags season come to an end with a 81-66 loss to the Ole Miss Rebels on March 20 at Williams Arena to finish the season 24-10 on the season.

== Personal life ==
Fortier is married to Craig Fortier, whom she met when they both attended Placer High School and Cal State Monterey Bay.
Craig was formerly the associate head coach for Jim Hayford's Whitworth Pirates and Eastern Washington Eagles men's basketball teams before being hired as an assistant to his wife at Gonzaga.
They have two sons and a daughter.
Fortier was diagnosed with breast cancer in February 2024. Eight months later, she is declared cancer free.

== Milestones ==
As Gonzaga head coach

- 100th career win/100th win at Gonzaga- November 11, 2018 at Eastern Washington University
- 100th WCC win as head coach- January 30, 2021 at St. Mary's
- 200th career win/200th win at Gonzaga- February 21, 2022 vs. Santa Clara
- Biggest ranked opponent upset in program history (96–78 victory over the #3 Stanford Cardinals on December 3, 2023)
- 250th career win/250th win at Gonzaga- January 18, 2024 at Loyola Marymount
- 300th career win/300th win at Gonzaga- January 2, 2026 at Seattle University
- Most 3 pointers in a single game (19)- February 3, 2024 against Pacific.
  Previous record was 17 (twice; Liberty on November 24, 2023 and BYU on February 2, 2017).

== Notable players under Fortier as assistant coach and head coach ==
- Jill Barta (2015–2018)
- Heather Bowman, formerly Gonzaga women's basketball all-time leading scorer from 2010-2025 before being surpassed by Yvonne Ejim in February 2025. (played from 2006–2010).
  Inducted into the WCC Hall of Fame in 2020 for women's basketball.
- Yvonne Ejim (2020–2025). First WCC women's basketball player to score 2,000 points and grab 1,000 rebounds in their career. Ejim became the all-time leading scorer against St. Mary's in February 2025, surpassing Heather Bowman's career points record.
- Vivian Frieson (2006–2010). First ever Zags women's basketball player to be drafted in the WNBA draft (3rd round, 7th pick).
- Brynna Maxwell (2022–2024). Previously played for the Utah Utes from 2019 to 2022 before transferring to Gonzaga.
  Second round, 1st pick in the 2024 WNBA draft for the Chicago Sky.
- Katelan Redmon (2009–2012). Last pick of the 2012 WNBA draft for the New York Liberty.
- Kayla Standish (2008–2012). Second round, 7th pick of the 2012 WNBA draft for the Minnesota Lynx.
- Laura Stockton (2015–2019)
- Elle Tinkle, Gonzaga women's basketball player (2012–2017). Daughter of Oregon State Beavers men's basketball coach Wayne Tinkle.
- Kaylynne Truong (2019–2024). Second round, 9th pick in the 2024 WNBA Draft for the Washington Mystics.
  Twin sister Kayleigh also played for the Zags from 2019 to 2024.
- Courtney Vandersloot (2007–2011). Gonzaga women's basketball all-time assists leader and second-all-time leading scorer.
  Highest WNBA draft pick in team history (first round, 3rd pick)
  The only women's basketball player to have number retired (#21).

== Awards and honors ==
- Kathy Delaney-Smith Mid-Major Coach of the Year – 1 time (2024); inaugural recipient
- WCC Co-Coach of the Year- 1 time (2015) – She was one of three coaches selected for the honor, along with St. Mary's Gaels women's basketball coach Paul Thomas and Pacific Tigers women's basketball coach Lynne Roberts.
- Maggie Dixon Award Rookie Coach of the Year (2015)
- WCC Coach of the Year- 6 times (2017, 2018, 2019, 2023, 2024, & 2025)
- Hall of Fame

-Placer High School- inducted in 2020
-Cal State Monterey Bay- inducted in 2020
-Butte College- inducted in 2022

== Head coaching record ==
Record table
Season	Team	Overall	Conference	Standing	Postseason
Gonzaga Bulldogs (WCC) (2014–2026)
2014–15	Gonzaga	26–8	16–2	1st	NCAA Sweet Sixteen
2015–16	Gonzaga	19–14	10–8	5th	WNIT Second Round
2016–17	Gonzaga	26–7	14–4	1st	NCAA First Round
2017–18	Gonzaga	27–6	17–1	1st	NCAA First Round
2018–19	Gonzaga	29–5	16–2	1st	NCAA Second Round
2019–20	Gonzaga	28–3	17–1	1st	Postseason not held
2020–21	Gonzaga	23–4	16–1	1st	NCAA First Round
2021–22	Gonzaga	27–7	15–2	2nd	NCAA Second Round
2022–23	Gonzaga	28–5	17–1	1st	NCAA First Round
2023–24	Gonzaga	32–4	16–0	1st	NCAA Sweet Sixteen
2024–25	Gonzaga	24–11	17–3	T-1st	WBIT Quarterfinals
2025–26	Gonzaga	24–10	14–4	2nd	NCAA First Round
Gonzaga:		313–84 (.788)	185–29 (.864)		
Total:		313–84 (.788)			
National champion Postseason invitational champion Conference regular season champion Conference regular season and conference tournament champion Division regular season champion Division regular season and conference tournament champion Conference tournament champion
