= Shaylee Gonzales =

American basketball player

No. 2 – Dinamo Basket Sassari
- Position: Guard

Personal information
- Born: May 2, 2000 (age 26) Chandler, Arizona, U.S.
- Listed height: 5 ft 10 in (1.78 m)

Career information
- High school: Mesquite (Gilbert, Arizona)
- College: BYU (2018–2022); Texas (2022–2024)
- WNBA draft: 2024: undrafted

Career history
- 2024–present: Dinamo Basket Sassari

Career highlights
- Big 12 Newcomer of the Year (2023); 2× WCC Player of the Year (2021, 2022); 3× First-team All-WCC (2019, 2021, 2022); WCC Newcomer of the Year (2019); WCC All-Freshman Team (2019)

Shaylee Gonzales (born May 2, 2000) is an American professional basketball player for Dinamo Basket Sassari of the Lega Basket Femminile. She played college basketball for the BYU Cougars and Texas Longhorns.

== High school career ==
Gonzales played basketball for Mesquite High School in Gilbert, Arizona, where she was coached by her mother, Candice. As a junior, she averaged 19.8 points, 5.7 steals and 6.6 assists per game, leading her team to a 31–1 record and its first Class 5A state championship. She was named Arizona Gatorade Player of the Year. In her senior season, Gonzales averaged 21 points, 7.7 rebounds and five steals per game, helping Mesquite reach the Class 5A state title game. A three-star recruit, she committed to playing college basketball for BYU.

== College career ==
In the second round of the 2019 NCAA tournament, Gonzales scored a freshman season-high 32 points in a 72–63 loss to Stanford. As a freshman, she averaged 17 points, 5.6 rebounds and 4.1 assists per game, earning first-team All-West Coast Conference (WCC) and Newcomer of the Year honors. Gonzales was sidelined for her second season with a torn anterior cruciate ligament and meniscus in her right knee. She made her sophomore debut on November 27, 2020, scoring a season-high 30 points in a 67–51 win against LSU. Gonzales averaged 17.8 points, 5.3 rebounds and 3.6 assists per game as a sophomore. She shared the WCC Player of the Year award with Jenn Wirth and repeated as a first-team All-WCC selection. On February 12, 2022, Gonzales recorded a career-high 35 points, seven steals and six assists in an 84–69 win over Saint Mary's. She was named WCC Player of the Year and made the first-team All-WCC for a third time, averaging 18.3 points, 5.9 rebounds and 4.5 assists per game.

After her junior season at BYU and the departure of head coach Jeff Judkins, Gonzales entered the transfer portal. On July 11, 2022, she announced that she would transfer to Texas. As a senior, Gonzales averaged 12.7 points, 4.3 rebounds and 2.7 assists per game, earning Big 12 Newcomer of the Year and second-team All-Big 12 honors. She opted to return to Texas instead of entering the 2023 WNBA draft.

== Career statistics ==
Legend
GP	Games played	GS	Games started	MPG	Minutes per game	RPG	Rebounds per game
APG	Assists per game	SPG	Steals per game	BPG	Blocks per game	PPG	Points per game
TO	Turnovers per game	FG%	Field-goal percentage	3P%	3-point field-goal percentage	FT%	Free-throw percentage
**Bold**	Career best	°	League leader

=== College ===
Year	Team	GP	GS	MPG	FG%	3P%	FT%	RPG	APG	SPG	BPG	TO	PPG
2019–20	BYU	33	26	**34.8**	45.1	35.1	72.5	5.6	4.1	1.9	0.3	2.7	17.0
2019–20	BYU	Did not play due to injury											
2020–21	BYU	25	25	34.4	44.8	31.1	75.0	5.3	3.6	**2.4**	0.2	**3.1**	17.8
2021–22	BYU	30	30	31.6	**49.5**	22.7	83.3	**5.9**	**4.5**	2.3	0.2	2.7	**18.3**
2022–23	Texas	36	36	33.3	41.7	35.1	**86.2**	4.3	2.7	1.6	**0.5**	2.3	12.7
2023–24	Texas	**38**	**38**	31.8	41.4	**38.0**	78.6	3.4	2.7	1.6	0.2	1.8	9.4
**Career**		162	155	33.1	44.7	33.3	79.1	4.8	3.4	1.9	0.3	2.5	14.6
Statistics retrieved from Sports-Reference.

== Personal life ==
Gonzales is the daughter of Josh and Candice Gonzales, both of whom played college basketball for Grand Canyon. Her parents work in real estate and own a home health company. In high school, Gonzales launched Sincerely Shaylee, a photography business. She has a large social media following on platforms including TikTok and YouTube. Gonzales has signed name, image and likeness deals with Mountain America Credit Union, among other companies. In college, she majors in journalism with a focus on sports media.
