= 2021 NCAA Division I women's basketball tournament =

American women's collegiate basketball tournament

- Season: 2020–21
- Teams: 64
- Finals site: Alamodome, San Antonio, Texas
- Champions: Stanford Cardinal (3rd title, 5th title game, 14th Final Four)
- Runner-up: Arizona Wildcats (1st title game, 1st Final Four)
- Semifinalists: South Carolina Gamecocks (3rd Final Four); UConn Huskies (21st Final Four)
- Winning coach: Tara VanDerveer (3rd title)
- MOP: Haley Jones (Stanford)

The 2021 NCAA Division I women's basketball tournament was a single-elimination tournament of 64 teams to determine the National Collegiate Athletic Association (NCAA) Division I college basketball national champion for the 2020–21 NCAA Division I women's basketball season. The 39th edition of the tournament began on March 21, 2021, in sites around San Antonio, Texas, and concluded with the championship game on April 4 at the Alamodome, with the Stanford Cardinal defeating the Arizona Wildcats 54–53 to win their third NCAA title.

Due to logistical considerations surrounding the ongoing COVID-19 pandemic (which resulted in the cancellation of the 2020 tournament), and mirroring a similar decision by the men's tournament, the entire tournament was played in the San Antonio area rather than at sites across the country, with some first and second-round games played in nearby San Marcos and Austin. The Alamodome hosted all games from the regional semifinals onward, including the originally-awarded Final Four and championship game.

Four schools, America East champion Stony Brook, Big South champion High Point, Missouri Valley champion Bradley and Utah Valley from the WAC (California Baptist won the WAC tournament, but was ineligible for the NCAA tournament because it is in the third year of a four-year transition from Division II), made their first appearance in the tournament.

Additionally, Tennessee continued its record streak of making every edition of the tournament. Arizona made its first-ever appearance in the Final Four. UConn extended its record streak of 13 consecutive Final Four appearances. Wake Forest and Washington State made their first appearances since 1988 and 1991, respectively.

== Tournament procedure ==
The tournament's 64 teams consisted of the 31 conference champions (down from 32, due to the Ivy League having cancelled all winter athletics due to COVID-19), and 33 "at-large" bids extended by the Selection Committee.

This tournament was the first since 1983 in which the RPI was not used in the selection process. On May 4, 2020, the NCAA announced that it would replace the RPI with the NET (NCAA Evaluation Tool), a metric that has been used in the selection process for the men's tournament since 2019. The women's version of the NET uses input data specific to the women's game but is otherwise functionally identical to the men's version.

== Schedule and venues ==
On February 5, 2021, the NCAA announced that due to logistical considerations associated with the COVID-19 pandemic (which prompted the cancellation of the 2020 tournament), the entirety of the tournament would be conducted at sites in and around San Antonio and Austin (mirroring a similar decision for the men's tournament, which would similarly use venues in and around its Final Four host city of Indianapolis), rather than across the country;

2021 NCAA tournament venues

First and second round (March 21–22, 23–24)

- Alamodome, San Antonio, Texas (Host: University of the Incarnate Word)
- Bill Greehey Arena, San Antonio (Hosts: University of Houston and St. Mary's University)
- Frank Erwin Center, Austin, Texas (Host: University of Texas at Austin)
- Strahan Arena, San Marcos, Texas (Host: Texas State University)
- UTSA Convocation Center, San Antonio (Host: the University of Texas at San Antonio)

Regional semifinals and finals (Sweet Sixteen and Elite Eight) (March 27–30)

- Alamodome, San Antonio (Hosts: the University of the Incarnate Word and the University of Texas at San Antonio)

National semifinals and championship (final Four and championship) (April 2 and 4)

- Alamodome, San Antonio (Hosts: the University of the Incarnate Word, the University of Texas at San Antonio, and San Antonio Sports)

The Alamodome had two courts for first- and second-round games, and was converted to a single court for later rounds. Practices were held at the Alamodome and the Henry B. González Convention Center. The regions were named after famous sites in San Antonio: the Alamo, the HemisFair, the Mercado, and the River Walk.

All games were played behind closed doors (with only friends and family present) until the Sweet Sixteen at the Alamodome, which operated at 17% capacity (10,880) for the remainder of the tournament.

=== Facilities inequality ===
Concerns over gender inequality were raised prior to the tournament, citing differences in the quality of facilities and amenities between the women's and men's tournament; among other examples, Arizona coach Adia Barnes criticized the lack of weight training equipment in the workout room (consisting of only a single tower of weights, in comparison to the larger weight room of the men's tournament). A video by Oregon forward Sedona Prince showing the aforementioned weight room drew wider attention to the disparity on social media. Other forms of disparities were noted, including differing COVID-19 testing protocols, smaller "swag bags", and different food options.

The NCAA had originally planned for the full weight room to only become available for the Sweet Sixteen round. Vice President of Women's Basketball Lynn Holzman stated that the NCAA had planned to expand the facilities in the workout room over the course of the tournament due to space constraints, but were "actively working to enhance existing resources at practice courts, including additional weight training equipment." Barnes stated that the Henry B. González Convention Center had "plenty of open areas" that could have been used, and that "it takes people like me that were pro players being a voice for things to change. There's a lot of voices out there. People care now. The fact that the NCAA responded so fast, I think that's good. That's meaningful."

In a letter obtained by tournament broadcaster ESPN on March 22, NCAA president Mark Emmert stated that "much has been resolved", but that he would investigate "exactly how we found ourselves in this situation", and "directed our leadership team and appropriate staff to assess all the services, resources, and facilities provided to both the men's and women's teams so that we have a completely clear comparison". The America East Conference and Ivy League sent a letter to Emmert, arguing that the incident "warrants a comprehensive discussion once the tournaments conclude about how we—national office staff and membership—can protect and ensure equity across all championships in the future, but especially in the sport of basketball."

The incident led to discussions surrounding other forms of inequalities between the men's and women's tournaments, including their difference in budget, no revenue bonuses awarded to schools for winning the tournament, NCAA marketing of "March Madness" having focused almost exclusively on the men's tournament (with the women's tournament having never officially used the name; and tournament branding often used generic "NCAA Women's Basketball" logos instead), and the men's tournament often being referred to as "the NCAA tournament" by media and the general public with no disambiguation. In a Sportico op-ed, America East commissioner Amy Huchthausen accused the NCAA of "restricting women's basketball from taking advantage of an emerging market", noting that the NCAA's official sponsorships are managed by the CBS Sports/Turner Sports consortium that broadcasts the men's tournament, and that the ESPN contract to televise the women's tournament (which is bundled with those of other NCAA championships) "provides a measure of financial certainty, but it does not provide women's basketball (or any of the other sports, for that matter) an incentive to grow".

The NCAA commissioned an independent review of gender equality among all of its championships by the law firm Kaplan Hecker & Fink LLP (now Hecker Fink LLP); the first phase, focusing specifically on NCAA basketball championships, was published on August 3, 2021. The review concluded that the structure of the NCAA's operations were designed to "maximize the value of and support to the Division I Men's Basketball Championship as the primary source of funding for the NCAA and its membership"; it found that the CBS/Turner sponsorship contracts require advertisers to pay for marketing rights across all of the NCAA's championships (including the men's tournament, which can be costly), and that advertisers also had to separately pay ESPN for airtime during the women's tournament's telecasts. The review included several recommendations, including that:

- The media rights for the women's Division I basketball tournament be sold separately from other NCAA championships. It was estimated that media rights to the women's tournament could be worth at least $81 million per-season (in comparison to the $34 million total of the then-current ESPN contract).
- The women's tournament be expanded to 68 teams, as with the men's tournament.
- The women's tournament adopt the same revenue distribution framework as the men's tournament.
- The NCAA's contracts be renegotiated to provide more opportunities for entities who wish to sponsor specific NCAA championships other than the men's basketball tournament.
- The "March Madness" branding be extended to the women's tournament.
- The men's and women's Final Four be hosted together in the same venue.

The NCAA implemented two of these recommendations—the expansion to a 68-team format, and use of the "March Madness" branding—for the 2022 tournament. The NCAA renewed its contract with ESPN in January 2024 under an eight-year contract, now valued at an average of $115 million per season, and granting ESPN additional rights to sell sponsorships for its tournament broadcasts. The revenue distribution framework long used in the men's tournament was extended to the women's tournament starting in 2025, thus implementing another recommendation in the report.

=== Original 2021 NCAA tournament schedule and venues ===
2021 NCAA regional (blue) and Final Four (red) locations as originally selected

The tournament's first two rounds were originally scheduled to be hosted by the top sixteen seeds. The following were the sites initially selected to host the later rounds of the 2021 tournament:

Regional semifinals and finals (Sweet Sixteen and Elite Eight) (March 26–29)

- Times Union Center, Albany, New York (Hosts: Siena College and Metro Atlantic Athletic Conference)
- H-E-B Center at Cedar Park, Cedar Park, Texas (Host: University of Texas at Austin)
- Cintas Center, Cincinnati, Ohio (Hosts: Xavier University and Cincinnati USA Sports Commission)
- Spokane Veterans Memorial Arena, Spokane, Washington (Host: University of Idaho)

National semifinals and championship (final Four and championship) (April 2 and 4)

- Alamodome, San Antonio (Hosts: the University of the Incarnate Word, the University of Texas at San Antonio, and San Antonio Sports)

This is the third time that the women's Final Four was played in San Antonio, having previously been played in the city in 2002 and 2010.

== Qualification and selection ==
=== Automatic qualifiers ===
The following teams automatically qualified for the 2021 NCAA field by virtue of winning their conference's tournament. (Note: California Baptist won the WAC tournament, but was ineligible for the NCAA Tournament due to its transition from Division II and instead played in the WNIT. Utah Valley received the WAC's bid by finishing in second place behind California Baptist in the regular season.)

Conference	Team	Record	Appearance	Last bid
ACC	NC State	20–2	26th	2019
America East	Stony Brook	15–5	1st	Never
American	South Florida	18–3	7th	2018
ASUN	Florida Gulf Coast	26–2	7th	2019
Atlantic 10	VCU	16–10	2nd	2009
Big 12	Baylor	25–2	19th	2019
Big East	UConn	24–1	32nd	2019
Big Sky	Idaho State	22–3	4th	2012
Big South	High Point	22–6	1st	Never
Big Ten	Maryland	24–2	28th	2019
Big West	UC Davis	13–2	3rd	2019
Colonial	Drexel	14–8	2nd	2009
C-USA	Middle Tennessee	17–7	19th	2016
Horizon	Wright State	18–7	3rd	2019
Ivy League	Ivy League season canceled			
MAAC	Marist	18–3	11th	2014
MAC	Central Michigan	18–8	6th	2019
MEAC	North Carolina A&T	14–2	5th	2018
Missouri Valley	Bradley	17–11	1st	Never
Mountain West	Wyoming	14–9	2nd	2008
Northeast	Mount St. Mary's	17–6	3rd	1995
Ohio Valley	Belmont	20–5	6th	2019
Pac-12	Stanford	25–2	34th	2019
Patriot	Lehigh	10–5	4th	2010
SEC	South Carolina	22–4	17th	2019
Southern	Mercer	19–6	3rd	2019
Southland	Stephen F. Austin	24–2	17th	2006
SWAC	Jackson State	18–5	5th	2008
Summit League	South Dakota	19–5	3rd	2019
Sun Belt	Troy	22–5	4th	2017
West Coast	Gonzaga	23–3	12th	2019
WAC	Utah Valley	13–6	1st	Never

=== Tournament seeds ===
Alamo regional – Alamodome, San Antonio, Texas
Seed	School	Conference	Record	NET	Berth type
1	Stanford	Pac-12	25–2	1	Automatic
2	Louisville	ACC	23–3	6	At-Large
3	Georgia	SEC	20–6	13	At-Large
4	Arkansas	SEC	19–8	17	At-Large
5	Missouri State	Missouri Valley	21–2	20	At-Large
6	Oregon	Pac-12	13–8	10	At-Large
7	Northwestern	Big Ten	15–8	31	At-Large
8	Oklahoma State	Big 12	18–8	27	At-Large
9	Wake Forest	ACC	12–12	47	At-Large
10	UCF	American	16–4	38	At-Large
11	South Dakota	Summit	19–5	32	Automatic
12	UC Davis	Big West	13–2	71	Automatic
13	Wright State	Horizon	18–7	80	Automatic
14	Drexel	Colonial	14–8	106	Automatic
15	Marist	MAAC	18–3	103	Automatic
16	Utah Valley	WAC	13–6	216	Automatic

Mercado regional – Alamodome, San Antonio, Texas
Seed	School	Conference	Record	NET	Berth type
1	NC State	ACC	20–2	7	Automatic
2	Texas A&M	SEC	23–2	11	At-Large
3	Arizona	Pac-12	16–5	15	At-Large
4	Indiana	Big Ten	18–5	9	At-Large
5	Gonzaga	WCC	23–3	16	Automatic
6	Rutgers	Big Ten	14–4	12	At-Large
7	Iowa State	Big 12	16–10	26	At-Large
8	South Florida	American	18–3	25	Automatic
9	Washington State	Pac-12	12–11	45	At-Large
10	Michigan State	Big Ten	15–8	40	At-Large
11	BYU	WCC	18–5	50	At-Large
12	Belmont	Ohio Valley	20–5	63	Automatic
13	VCU	Atlantic 10	16–10	105	Automatic
14	Stony Brook	America East	15–5	100	Automatic
15	Troy	Sun Belt	22–5	115	Automatic
16	North Carolina A&T	MEAC	14–2	123	Automatic

HemisFair regional – Alamodome, San Antonio, Texas
Seed	School	Conference	Record	NET	Berth type
1	South Carolina	SEC	22–4	4	Automatic
2	Maryland	Big Ten	24–2	5	Automatic
3	UCLA	Pac-12	16–5	8	At-Large
4	West Virginia	Big 12	21–6	24	At-Large
5	Georgia Tech	ACC	15–8	30	At-Large
6	Texas	Big 12	18–9	29	At-Large
7	Alabama	SEC	16–9	33	At-Large
8	Oregon State	Pac-12	11–7	36	At-Large
9	Florida State	ACC	10–8	48	At-Large
10	North Carolina	ACC	13–10	35	At-Large
11	Bradley	Missouri Valley	17–11	79	Automatic
12	Stephen F. Austin	Southland	24–2	19	Automatic
13	Lehigh	Patriot	10–5	75	Automatic
14	Wyoming	Mountain West	14–9	99	Automatic
15	Mount St. Mary's	Northeast	17–6	114	Automatic
16	Mercer	Southern	19–6	146	Automatic

River Walk regional – Alamodome, San Antonio, Texas
Seed	School	Conference	Record	NET	Berth type
1	UConn	Big East	24–1	2	Automatic
2	Baylor	Big 12	25–2	3	Automatic
3	Tennessee	SEC	16–7	14	At-Large
4	Kentucky	SEC	17–8	18	At-Large
5	Iowa	Big Ten	18–9	23	At-Large
6	Michigan	Big Ten	14–5	22	At-Large
7	Virginia Tech	ACC	14–9	28	At-Large
8	Syracuse	ACC	14–8	43	At-Large
9	South Dakota State	Summit	21–3	46	At-Large
10	Marquette	Big East	19–6	34	At-Large
11	Florida Gulf Coast	ASUN	26–2	41	Automatic
12	Central Michigan	MAC	18–8	90	Automatic
13	Idaho State	Big Sky	22–3	84	Automatic
14	Middle Tennessee	C-USA	17–7	107	Automatic
15	Jackson State	SWAC	18–5	111	Automatic
16	High Point	Big South	22–6	180	Automatic

== Tournament records ==
- Arizona's Aari McDonald made 22 three-pointers in the tournament, tying the record for the most ever made in an NCAA tournament, set by Kia Nurse in 2017.
- NC State's Kai Crutchfield hit 10 of 11 three point field-goal attempts, getting 90.9% of her attempts, setting the record for best three point field-goal percentage in a tournament.

== Bracket ==
All times are listed as Central Daylight Time (UTC−5)
* – Denotes overtime period

=== Alamo regional – San Antonio, Texas ===
First round Round of 64; March 21–22	Second round Round of 32; March 23–24
1	Stanford	87
16	Utah Valley	44
1	Stanford	73
Alamodome (March 21); Bill Greehey Arena (March 21)
8	Oklahoma State	62
8	Oklahoma State	84
9	Wake Forest	61
Convocation Center (March 23); Convocation Center (March 24)
5	Missouri State	70
12	UC Davis	51
5	Missouri State	64
Bill Greehey Arena (March 22); Frank Erwin Center (March 22)
13	Wright State	39
4	Arkansas	62
13	Wright State	66
6	Oregon	67
11	South Dakota	47
6	Oregon	57
Alamodome (March 22); Bill Greehey Arena (March 22)
3	Georgia	50
3	Georgia	67
14	Drexel	53
Alamodome (March 24); Alamodome (March 24)
7	Northwestern	62
10	UCF	51
7	Northwestern	53
Bill Greehey Arena (March 22); Alamodome (March 22)
2	Louisville	62
2	Louisville	74
15	Marist	43

Regional semifinals Sweet Sixteen; March 28
1	Stanford	89
5	Missouri State	62
6	Oregon	42
2	Louisville	60

Regional final Elite Eight; March 30
1	Stanford	78
2	Louisville	63

* – Denotes overtime period

==== Alamo regional final ====
ESPN

March 30
8:00pm

#2 Louisville Cardinals 63, #1 Stanford Cardinal 78
Scoring by quarter: 21–13, 17–13, 12–22, 13–30
Pts: D. Evans, 24; Rebs: M. Robinson, 8 Asts: D. Evans, K. Smith, M. Robinson, 3	Pts: Le. Hull, 21; Rebs: H. Jones, 10; Asts: K. Williams, 5

Alamodome – San Antonio, Texas
Attendance: 1,463
Referees: Katie Lukanich, Michael Price, Cheryl Flores

=== HemisFair regional – San Antonio, Texas ===
First round Round of 64; March 21–22	Second round Round of 32; March 23–24
1	South Carolina	79
16	Mercer	53
1	South Carolina	59
Alamodome (March 21); Strahan Arena (March 21)
8	Oregon State	42
8	Oregon State	83
9	Florida State	59
Alamodome (March 23); Convocation Center (March 23)
5	Georgia Tech	54*
12	Stephen F. Austin	52
5	Georgia Tech	73
Bill Greehey Arena (March 21); Bill Greehey Arena (March 21)
4	West Virginia	56
4	West Virginia	77
13	Lehigh	53
6	Texas	81
11	Bradley	62
6	Texas	71
Strahan Arena (March 22); Frank Erwin Center (March 22)
3	UCLA	62
3	UCLA	69
14	Wyoming	48
Alamodome (March 24); Bill Greehey Arena (March 24)
7	Alabama	80
10	North Carolina	71
7	Alabama	64
Alamodome (March 22); Alamodome (March 22)
2	Maryland	100
2	Maryland	98
15	Mount St. Mary's	45

Regional semifinals Sweet Sixteen; March 28
1	South Carolina	76
5	Georgia Tech	65
6	Texas	64
2	Maryland	61

Regional final Elite Eight; March 30
1	South Carolina	62
6	Texas	34

* – Denotes overtime period

==== HemisFair regional final ====
ESPN

March 30
6:00pm

#6 Texas Longhorns 34, #1 South Carolina Gamecocks 62
Scoring by quarter: 7–18, 15–19, 12–15, 0–10
Pts: A. Warren, 13; Rebs: C. Taylor, L. Ebo, 7 Asts: J. Allen-Taylor, 3	Pts: Z. Cooke, 16; Rebs: A. Boston, B. Beal, L. Amihere, V. Saxton, 8 Asts: D. Henderson, 7

Alamodome – San Antonio, Texas
Attendance: 0
Referees: Joseph Vaszily, Infini Robinson, Pualani Spurlock

=== Mercado regional – San Antonio, Texas ===
First round Round of 64; March 21–22	Second round Round of 32; March 23–24
1	NC State	79
16	North Carolina A&T	58
1	NC State	79
Strahan Arena (March 21); Frank Erwin Center (March 21)
8	South Florida	67
8	South Florida	57
9	Washington State	53
Alamodome (March 23); Bill Greehey Arena (March 24)
5	Gonzaga	59
12	Belmont	64
12	Belmont	48
Strahan Arena (March 22); Convocation Center (March 22)
4	Indiana	70
4	Indiana	63
13	VCU	32
6	Rutgers	66
11	BYU	69
11	BYU	46
Strahan Arena (March 22); Alamodome (March 22)
3	Arizona	52
3	Arizona	79
14	Stony Brook	44
Convocation Center (March 24); Alamodome (March 24)
7	Iowa State	79
10	Michigan State	75
7	Iowa State	82
Alamodome (March 22); Frank Erwin Center (March 22)
2	Texas A&M	84*
2	Texas A&M	84
15	Troy	80

Regional semifinals Sweet Sixteen; March 27
1	NC State	70
4	Indiana	73
3	Arizona	74
2	Texas A&M	59

Regional final Elite Eight; March 29
4	Indiana	53
3	Arizona	66

* – Denotes overtime period

==== Mercado regional final ====
ESPN

March 29
8:00pm

#4 Indiana Hoosiers 53, #3 Arizona Wildcats 66
Scoring by quarter: 11–14, 12–13, 21–19, 9–20
Pts: M. Holmes, 20; Rebs: A. Gulbe, 9 Asts: G. Berger, 4	Pts: A. McDonald, 33; Rebs: A. McDonald, 11; Asts: A. McDonald, 4

Alamodome – San Antonio, Texas
Attendance: 0
Referees: Felicia Grinter, Tiara Cruse, Tiffany Bird

=== River Walk regional – San Antonio, Texas ===
First round Round of 64; March 21	Second round Round of 32; March 23
1	UConn	102
16	High Point	59
1	UConn	83
Alamodome (March 21); Frank Erwin Center (March 21)
8	Syracuse	47
8	Syracuse	72
9	South Dakota State	55
Alamodome (March 23); Bill Greehey Arena (March 23)
5	Iowa	87
12	Central Michigan	72
5	Iowa	86
Alamodome (March 21); Alamodome (March 21)
4	Kentucky	72
4	Kentucky	71
13	Idaho State	63
6	Michigan	87
11	Florida Gulf Coast	66
6	Michigan	70
Convocation Center (March 21); Frank Erwin Center (March 21)
3	Tennessee	55
3	Tennessee	87
14	Middle Tennessee	62
Alamodome (March 23); Bill Greehey Arena (March 23)
7	Virginia Tech	70
10	Marquette	63
7	Virginia Tech	48
Strahan Arena (March 21); Alamodome (March 21)
2	Baylor	90
2	Baylor	101
15	Jackson State	52

Regional semifinals Sweet Sixteen; March 27
1	UConn	92
5	Iowa	72
6	Michigan	75
2	Baylor	78*

Regional final Elite Eight; March 29
1	UConn	69
2	Baylor	67

* – Denotes overtime period

==== River Walk regional final ====
ESPN

March 29
6:00pm

#2 Baylor Lady Bears 67, #1 UConn Huskies 69
Scoring by quarter: 24–26, 15–11, 16–16, 12–16
Pts: D. Carrington, 22; Rebs: N. Smith, 13; Asts: N. Smith, M. Ursin, D. Carrington, 3	Pts: P. Bueckers, 28; Rebs: O. Nelson-Ododa, 8 Asts: O. Nelson-Ododa, 4

Alamodome – San Antonio, Texas
Attendance: 3,377
Referees: Lisa Jones, Brian Hall, Karen Preato

== Final Four ==
During the Final Four round, Stanford, the winner of the Alamo Regional defeated South Carolina, the winner of the HemisFair Regional. Arizona, the winner of the Mercado Regional defeated UConn, the winner of the River Walk Regional. In the championship game, Stanford defeated Arizona by a score of 54–53 to take the 2021 title.

=== Alamodome – San Antonio, Texas ===
National semifinals Final Four; April 2
A1	Stanford	66
H1	South Carolina	65
M3	Arizona	69
RW1	UConn	59

National championship game April 4
A1	Stanford	54
M3	Arizona	53

==== National semifinals ====
ESPN

April 2
5:00 pm

A1 Stanford Cardinal 66, H1 South Carolina Gamecocks 65
Scoring by quarter: 15–15, 16–10, 21–24, 14–16
Pts: H. Jones, 24; Rebs: Le. Hull, 13; Asts: Le. Hull, 4	Pts: Z. Cooke, 25; Rebs: A. Boston, 16; Asts: D. Henderson, 3

Alamodome – San Antonio, Texas
Attendance: 0
Referees: Eric Brewton, Brenda Pantoja, Gina Cross

ESPN

April 2
8:30 pm

M3 Arizona Wildcats 69, RW1 UConn Huskies 59
Scoring by quarter: 16–10, 16–12, 16–17, 21–20
Pts: A. McDonald, 26; Rebs: H. Pueyo, 8 Asts: B. Yeaney, 4	Pts: C. Williams, 20; Rebs: A. Edwards, 7 Asts: P. Bueckers, 4

Alamodome – San Antonio, Texas
Attendance: 4,793
Referees: Chuck Gonzalez, Dee Kantner, Pualani Spurlock-Welsh

==== National championship ====
ESPN

April 4
5:00 pm

A1 Stanford Cardinal 54, M3 Arizona Wildcats 53
Scoring by quarter: 16–8, 15–16, 12–16, 11–13
Pts: H. Jones, 17; Rebs: Le. Hull, 10; Asts: A. Prechtel, A. Wilson, K. Williams, 3	Pts: A. McDonald, 22; Rebs: S. Thomas, S. Pellington, 7 Asts: A. McDonald, T. Baptiste, 2

Alamodome – San Antonio, Texas
Attendance: 4,604
Referees: Cheryl Flores, Maj Forsberg, Felicia Grinter

==== Final Four all-tournament team ====
- Haley Jones (MOP), Stanford
- Lexie Hull, Stanford
- Aari McDonald, Arizona
- Zia Cooke, South Carolina
- Paige Bueckers, UConn

== Record by conference ==
Conference	Bids	Record	Win %	R64	R32	S16	E8	F4	CG	NC
Pac-12	6	15–5	.750	6	5	3	2	2	2	1
Big East	2	4–2	.667	2	1	1	1	1	–	–
SEC	7	10–7	.588	7	6	2	1	1	–	–
ACC	8	9–8	.529	8	5	3	1	–	–	–
Big 12	5	9–5	.643	5	5	2	2	–	–	–
Big Ten	7	10–7	.588	7	5	4	1	–	–	–
Missouri Valley	2	2–2	.500	2	1	1	–	–	–	–
WCC	2	1–2	.333	2	1	–	–	–	–	–
American	2	1–2	.333	2	1	–	–	–	–	–
Horizon	1	1–1	.500	1	1	–	–	–	–	–
Ohio Valley	1	1–1	.500	1	1	–	–	–	–	–
Summit	2	0–2	.000	2	–	–	–	–	–	–
MAC	1	0–1	.000	1	–	–	–	–	–	–
Southland	1	0–1	.000	1	–	–	–	–	–	–
C-USA	1	0–1	.000	1	–	–	–	–	–	–
SWAC	1	0–1	.000	1	–	–	–	–	–	–
MEAC	1	0–1	.000	1	–	–	–	–	–	–
Atlantic 10	1	0–1	.000	1	–	–	–	–	–	–
Mountain West	1	0–1	.000	1	–	–	–	–	—	–
America East	1	0–1	.000	1	–	–	–	–	–	–
Atlantic Sun	1	0–1	.000	1	–	–	–	–	–	–
Big Sky	1	0–1	.000	1	–	–	–	–	–	–
Big South	1	0–1	.000	1	–	–	–	–	–	–
Big West	1	0–1	.000	1	–	–	–	–	–	–
Colonial	1	0–1	.000	1	–	–	–	–	–	–
MAAC	1	0–1	.000	1	–	–	–	–	–	–
Patriot	1	0–1	.000	1	–	–	–	–	–	–
Southern	1	0–1	.000	1	–	–	–	–	–	–
WAC	1	0–1	.000	1	–	–	–	–	–	–
Sun Belt	1	0–1	.000	1	–	–	–	–	–	–
Northeast	1	0–1	.000	1	–	–	–	–	–	–

- The R64, R32, S16, E8, F4, CG, and NC columns indicate how many teams from each conference were in the round of 64 (first round), round of 32 (second round), Sweet 16, Elite Eight, Final Four, championship game, and national champion, respectively.
- The American, America East, Atlantic 10, Atlantic Sun, Big Sky, Big South, Big West, Conference USA, Colonial, Horizon, MAAC, MEAC, Mountain West, Northeast, Ohio Valley, Patriot, Southern, Southland, Sun Belt, SWAC, and WAC conferences each had one representative that was eliminated in the first round.

== Media coverage ==
=== Television ===
ESPN served as broadcaster of the tournament, as part of its multi-year deal to broadcast NCAA national championships. Following a similar broadcast arrangement to the men's tournament under the CBS/Turner consortium, ESPN announced that all games in the tournament would be televised nationally in their entirety by either ESPN, ESPN2, ESPNU, or, for the first time, ABC (marking the first women's tournament to include coverage on broadcast television since 1995), rather than use a mix of regional broadcasts, streaming, and "whiparound" feeds.

Kerry Callahan became the first woman to serve as producer for ESPN's coverage of the Women's Final Four.

==== Studio host and analysts ====
- Maria Taylor (Host) (First, Second rounds, Regionals, Final Four, and National championship game)
- Kelsey Riggs (Host) (first round)
- Andy Landers (Analyst) (First, Second rounds, Regionals, Final Four, and National championship game)
- Rebecca Lobo (Analyst) (first and second rounds)
- Carolyn Peck (Analyst) (Regionals, Final Four, and National championship game)
- Andraya Carter (Analyst) (first round)
- Monica McNutt (Analyst) (first round)

==== Broadcast assignments ====
First and Second rounds

- Ryan Ruocco, Rebecca Lobo, and Holly Rowe (1st Round only) – Frank Erwin Center
- Beth Mowins, Renee Montgomery (1st & 2nd Rounds – Tuesday), and Debbie Antonelli (2nd Round – Wednesday) – Frank Erwin Center and Alamodome
- Courtney Lyle and Carolyn Peck – Alamodome
- Pam Ward and LaChina Robinson – Strahan Arena, Alamodome and Bill Greehey Arena
- Eric Frede and Tamika Catchings – Frank Erwin Center, Alamodome and Bill Greehey Arena
- Kevin Fitzgerald and Christy Thomaskutty – Frank Erwin Center, Strahan Arena and Alamodome
- Jenn Hildreth and Kelly Gramlich – Strahan Arena, Alamodome and UTSA Convocation Center
- Tiffany Greene and Steffi Sorensen – Bill Greehey Arena, Alamodome and UTSA Convocation Center
- Sam Ravech and Brenda VanLengen – Bill Greehey Arena and UTSA Convocation Center
- Roy Philpott and Brooke Weisbrod – Bill Greehey Arena and UTSA Convocation Center

Regionals

- Ryan Ruocco, Rebecca Lobo, and Holly Rowe – Alamodome
- Beth Mowins, Debbie Antonelli, and LaChina Robinson – Alamodome

Final Four

- Ryan Ruocco, Rebecca Lobo, Holly Rowe, and LaChina Robinson – Alamodome

=== Radio ===
Westwood One has exclusive radio rights to the entire tournament. Teams participating in the Elite Eight, Final Four, and Championship were allowed to have their own local broadcasts, but they were not allowed to stream those broadcasts online.

Regional finals

- Ted Emrich (Monday), Patrick Kinas (Tuesday), and Krista Blunk – Alamodome
- Roxy Bernstein and Kristen Kozlowski – Alamodome

Final Four and Championship

- Ryan Radtke and Debbie Antonelli – Alamodome

== See also ==
- 2021 Women's National Invitation Tournament
- 2021 Women's Basketball Invitational
- 2021 NCAA Division II women's basketball tournament
- 2021 NCAA Division III women's basketball tournament
- 2021 NCAA Division I men's basketball tournament
