= Mesquite High School (Arizona) =

- Home of the Wildcats

Location
- 500 South McQueen Road; Gilbert, Maricopa, Arizona 85233; United States; 33°20′27″N 111°49′33″W

Information
- Type: Public High school
- Motto: W.I.T.H Pride (informal); Mission, Motivation, Mastery (formal)
- Established: August 1998
- School district: Gilbert Public Schools
- Principal: Shawn Lynch
- Teaching staff: 77.30 (FTE)
- Grades: 9–12
- Enrollment: 1,411 (2023-2024)
- Student to teacher ratio: 18.25
- Campus type: Urban
- Colors: Royal blue and Silver
- Fight song: On, On, MHS!!
- Athletics conference: 4A - Desert Sky, Division II and III
- Mascot: Wildcat
- Nickname: The Wildcats
- Website: https://mesquitehigh.gilbertschools.net/
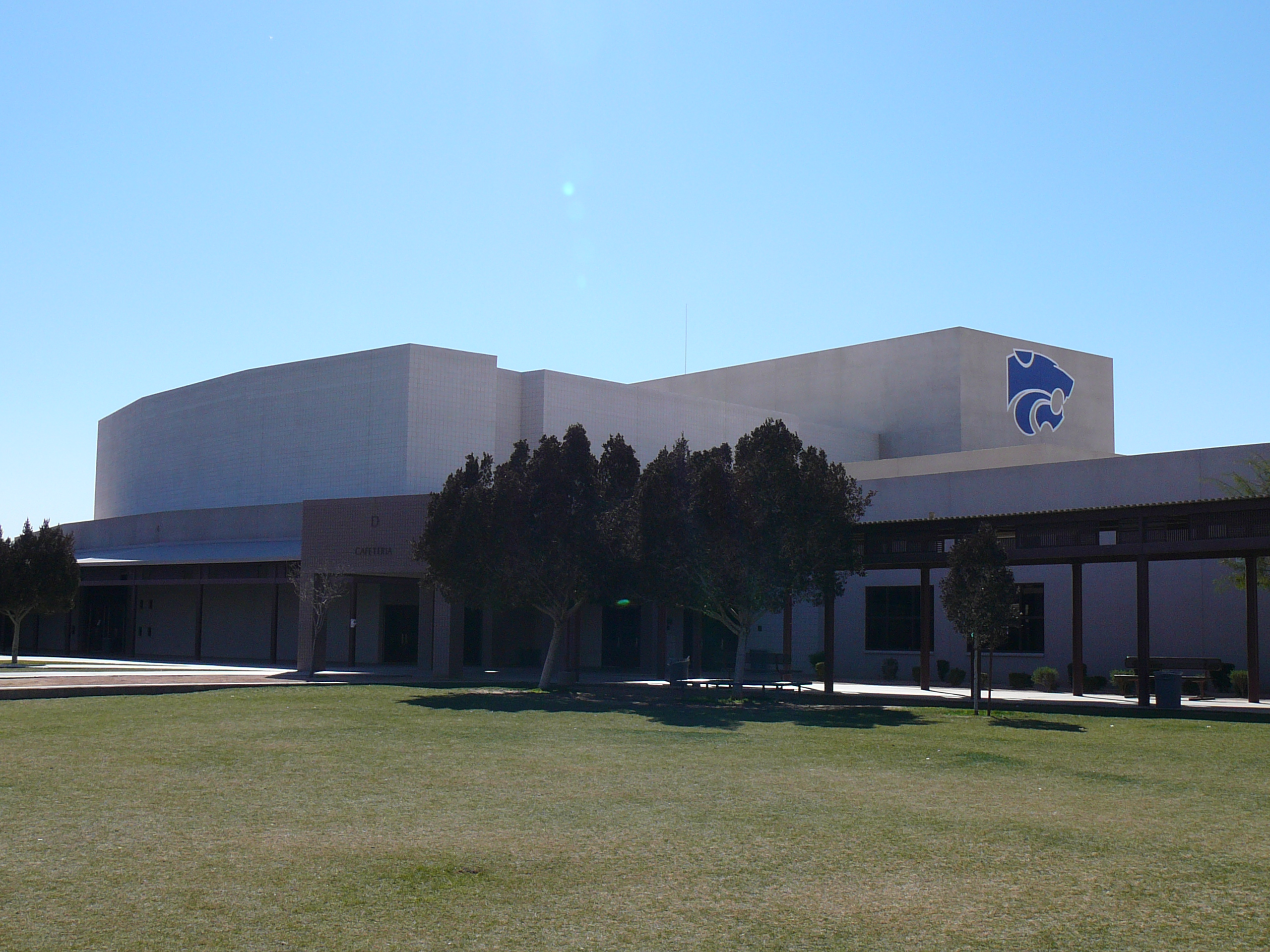
- School courtyard

Mesquite High School (MHS) is a public high school located in Gilbert, Arizona, United States. It was built in August 1998 and is part of the Gilbert Public Schools district. It accommodates grades 9–12, and in 2017, the school had a student body of 1,779.

== Overview ==
For the 2023-24 school year Mesquite High School received an "A" school grade from the Arizona Department of Education.

Mesquite's colors are Royal Blue and Silver and the teams are collectively called the Wildcats. The school is a member of the Arizona Interscholastic Association's 4A - Desert Sky Conference and competes in Division II and III sports.

== History ==
The school opened in August 1998 with only freshmen and sophomore students, while part of the school was not yet completed The first seniors graduated in May 2001, followed by the first senior class to attend all four years in Mesquite High School in May 2002. Since Mesquite's opening in 1998, the school had maintained 5A or 5A-I classification with student counts well above 2,000 and even over 3,000 at times. However, the opening of Campo Verde High School has significantly lowered the school's enrollment. As of 2012, Mesquite and Campo Verde both have about the same student population. Campo Verde and Mesquite High are rivals.

== Campus ==
There are twenty main buildings in the school, with a courtyard between the two major constructions. Over the summer of 2019, the school was remodeled and classrooms became organized by department/subject field.

Most classes are in the B, G, and A buildings. The portables located near the staff parking lot once held a variety of classes, but as of the 2012–2013 school year, the only portables in use are for Global Academy, an online school that has taken up residence at Mesquite. The A building holds the administration offices, the library, many of the science classrooms, and a connection between the B and G buildings on the second floor. The auditorium, music, and drama classes are located in the F building, which is adjacent to the D building, home to the school's main cafeteria. The B building houses math and English, while C.T.E. (Career and Technology Education) courses, world languages, and social studies classes can be found in G. There are also food courts in the B and G buildings, although they no longer serves food due to budget cuts. The gym and the physical education classes are located in the C building.

== Bands ==
Mesquite High School's concert bands, including Symphonic Band, Symphonic Winds, and Wind Ensemble, are year long programs and have four concerts throughout the school year.

In November 2014, the marching band was awarded the ABODA Division III State Championship after performing "Every Which Way." The marching band repeated its Division III State Championship in 2015 with the show "Luna Mysterium." They defended their title for the third time in a row in 2016 with the show "Beyond Limits."

On the morning of October 24, 2007, Assistant Band Director Christopher Rainer was killed in a car accident. On May 11, 2011, a piece commissioned by Richard L. Saucedo was performed to commemorate Rainer at Mesquite High by the top concert band, Wind Ensemble. The majority of the students in this group at that point were juniors and seniors when this tragedy occurred. Sean Dennison, was hired to fill his position.

The Rainer Marching Classic marching band competition was founded by the school in 2009 as a tribute to Chris Rainer's memory, impact, and legacy in the Mesquite High School band department. This has become a large, well-established competition in the area, attracting many schools from the region. In 2017, the "10th Anniversary Rainer Marching Classic" competition included 19 different band groups.

== Logo ==
In addition to its own school logo, Mesquite frequently uses Kansas State University's Powercat symbol. As part of the licensing agreement between Mesquite and Kansas State, the student council donates $500 to the university every two years.

== Notable alumni ==
- Mina Kimes (2003), ESPN TV Personality
- Lindsey Stirling (2004), violinist and singer
- Danny Batten (2006), NFL defensive end
- Gavin Edwards (2006), basketball player who plays in Japan
- Zach Davies (2011), MLB pitcher, contributed to a team no-hitter as a member of the Chicago Cubs
- Roy Lopez (2016), NFL nose tackle
- Shaylee Gonzales (2018), basketball player who plays professionally in Italy
- Ty Thompson (2021), tight end for the Tulane Green Wave
