= Gonzaga Bulldogs women's basketball =

2026–27 Gonzaga Bulldogs women's basketball team
- University: Gonzaga University
- Head coach: Lisa Fortier (12th season)
- Location: Spokane, Washington
- Arena: McCarthey Athletic Center (capacity: 6,000)
- Conference: Pac-12
- Nickname: Bulldogs
- Colors: Navy blue, white, and red

NCAA Division I tournament Elite Eight
- 2011
Other NCAA Division I tournament results
Sweet Sixteen	2010, 2011, 2012, 2015, 2024
Appearances	2007, 2009, 2010, 2011, 2012, 2013, 2014, 2015, 2017, 2018, 2019, 2021, 2022, 2023, 2024, 2026

Conference tournament champions
- 2007, 2009, 2010, 2011, 2013, 2014, 2017, 2018, 2021, 2022, 2026

Conference regular-season champions
- 1988, 2005, 2006, 2007, 2008, 2009, 2010, 2011, 2012, 2013, 2014, 2015, 2017, 2018, 2019, 2020, 2021, 2023, 2024, 2025

Uniforms
Home	Away	Alternate

The Gonzaga Bulldogs women's basketball is the college basketball program representing Gonzaga University. The school competes in the Pac-12 Conference in Division I of the National Collegiate Athletic Association (NCAA). The Bulldogs play home basketball games at the McCarthey Athletic Center in Spokane, Washington on the university campus.

== History ==
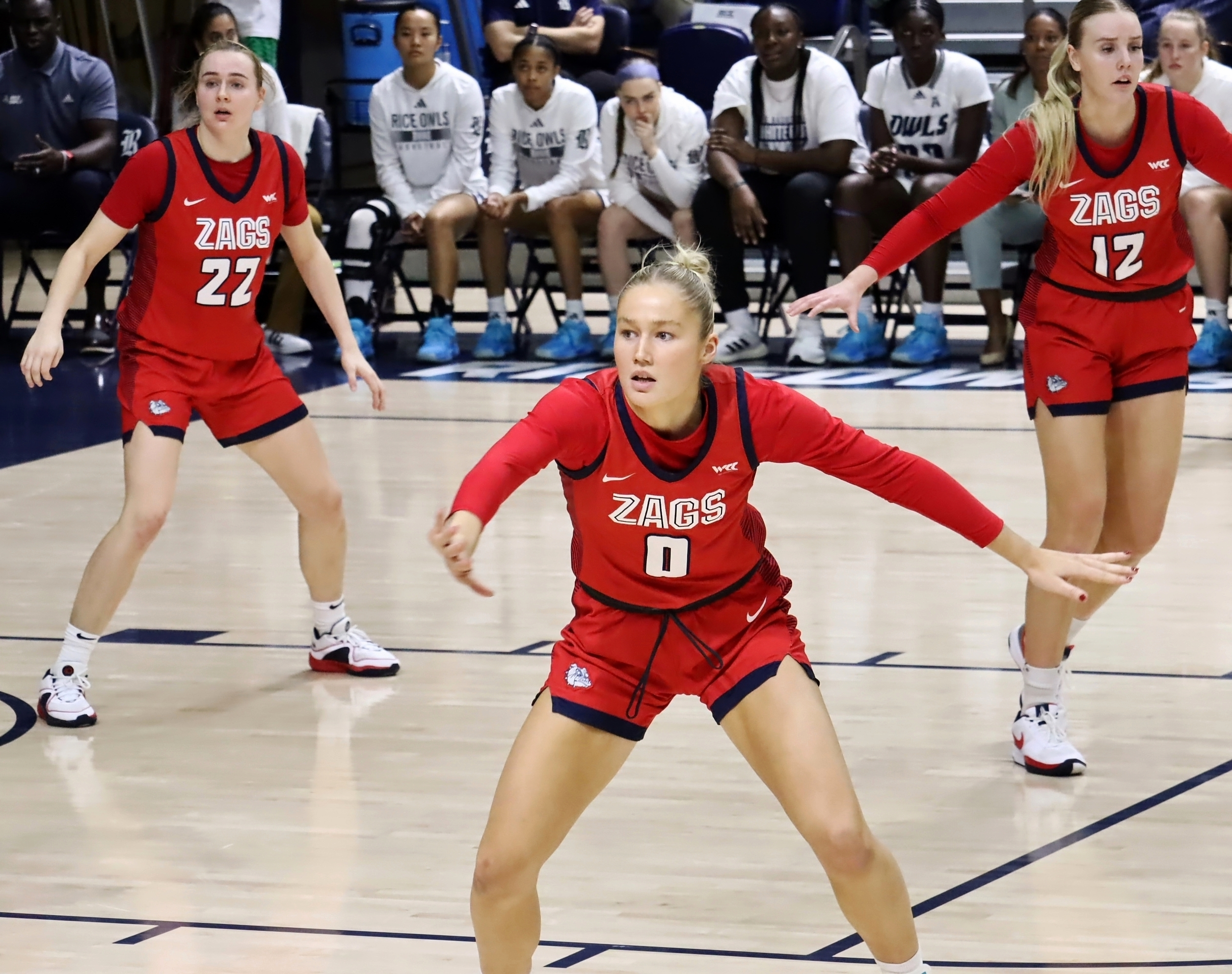
Gonzaga women's basketball players during a game at Tudor Fieldhouse in 2023

Gonzaga began play in 1987. They have appeared in the NCAA Tournament in 2007, 2009, 2010, 2011, 2012, 2013, 2014, 2015, 2017, 2018, 2019, 2021, 2022, 2023, and 2024.

They made the Second Round in 2009, 2010, 2011, 2012, 2015, 2022, and 2024. They made the Sweet Sixteen in 2010, 2011, 2012, 2015, and 2024. They made the Elite Eight in 2011.

They have made the WNIT in 1994, 2004, 2005, 2008, and 2016.

They have won the WCC Tournament title in 2007, 2009, 2010, 2011, 2013, 2014, 2017, 2018, 2021 and 2022. They have won the regular season title in 1988, 2005, 2006 (shared), 2007, 2008, 2009, 2010, 2011, 2012, 2013, 2014, 2015, 2017, 2018, 2019, 2020, 2021, and 2023.

As of the end of the 2022–23 season, the Bulldogs have an all-time record of 641–415.

== NCAA tournament results ==
Gonzaga has appeared in 16 NCAA Tournaments, with a record of 14–16.

Year	Seed	Round	Opponent	Result
2007	#12	First Round	#5 Middle Tenn	L 46–85
2009	#12	First Round; Second Round	#5 Xavier #4 Pittsburgh	W 74–59; L 60–65
2010	#7	First Round; Second Round; Sweet Sixteen	#10 North Carolina #2 Texas A&M #3 Xavier	W 82–76; W 72–71; L 56–74
2011	#11	First Round; Second Round; Sweet Sixteen; Elite Eight	#6 Iowa #3 UCLA #7 Louisville #1 Stanford	W 92–86; W 89–75; W 76–69; L 60–83
2012	#11	First Round; Second Round; Sweet Sixteen	#6 Rutgers #3 Miami (FL) #2 Kentucky	W 86–73; W 65–54; L 62–79
2013	#12	First Round	#5 Iowa State	L 60–72
2014	#6	First Round	#11 James Madison	L 63–72
2015	#11	First Round; Second Round; Sweet Sixteen	#6 George Washington #3 Oregon State #2 Tennessee	W 82–69; W 76–64; L 69–73 (OT)
2017	#11	First Round	#6 Oklahoma	L 62–75
2018	#13	First Round	#4 Stanford	L 68–82
2019	#5	First Round; Second Round	#12 Little Rock #4 Oregon State	W 68–51; L 70–76
2021	#5	First Round	#12 Belmont	L 59–64
2022	#9	First Round; Second Round	#8 Nebraska #1 Louisville	W 68–55; L 59–68
2023	#9	First Round	#8 Ole Miss	L 48–71
2024	#4	First Round; Second Round; Sweet Sixteen	#13 UC Irvine #5 Utah #1 Texas	W 75–56; W 77–66; L 47–69
2026	#12	First Round	#5 Ole Miss	L 66–81

== Retired numbers ==
Gonzaga has retired one number.

Gonzaga Bulldogs retired numbers
No.	Player	Pos.	Career	No. ret.	Ref.
21	Courtney Vandersloot	PG	2007–2011	2023	
