= 2020–21 North Alabama Lions women's basketball team =

Intercollegiate basketball season

2020–21 North Alabama Lions women's basketball
- Conference: Atlantic Sun Conference
- Record: 7–18 (6-9 ASUN)
- Head coach: Missy Tiber (8th season)
- Assistant coaches: Adrianne Harlow; Josh Ashley; Alison Seberger
- Home arena: Flowers Hall

2020–21 ASUN women's basketball standings
	Conf.				Overall
Team	W		L	PCT	W		L	PCT
No. 24 Florida Gulf Coast†	16	–	0	1.000	23	–	2	.920
Liberty	12	–	4	.750	17	–	7	.708
North Florida	11	–	5	.688	13	–	10	.565
Lipscomb	8	–	6	.571	11	–	9	.550
Stetson	7	–	9	.438	9	–	12	.429
North Alabama*	6	–	9	.400	7	–	17	.292
Bellarmine*	5	–	11	.313	5	–	16	.238
Kennesaw State	2	–	11	.154	7	–	11	.389
Jacksonville	1	–	13	.071	3	–	16	.158
† 2021 ASUN Tournament winner * ineligible for the 2021 NCAA tournament due to transition period As of March 6, 2021; Rankings from AP poll

The 2020–21 North Alabama Lions women's basketball team represented University of North Alabama during the 2020–21 NCAA Division I women's basketball season. They were led by head coach Missy Tiber in her eighth season at North Alabama. The Lions played their home games at the Flowers Hall in Florence, Alabama as members of the Atlantic Sun Conference.

This was North Alabama's third of a four-year transition period from Division II to Division I. As a result, the Lions were not eligible for NCAA postseason play but participated in the ASUN Tournament losing in the quarterfinals.

== Previous season ==
The Lions finished the 2019–20 season 21-9, 11-5 to finish tied in second place in ASUN play. They advanced to the semifinals of the conference tournament before losing in overtime to Liberty.
