= 2021 ASUN women's basketball tournament =

- Classification: Division I
- Season: 2020–21
- Teams: 9
- Site: KSU Convocation Center; Kennesaw, GA
- Champions: Florida Gulf Coast (7th title)
- Winning coach: Karl Smesko (7th title)
- MVP: Kierstan Bell (Florida Gulf Coast)
- Television: ESPN+

2020–21 ASUN women's basketball standings
	Conf.				Overall
Team	W		L	PCT	W		L	PCT
No. 24 Florida Gulf Coast†	16	–	0	1.000	23	–	2	.920
Liberty	12	–	4	.750	17	–	7	.708
North Florida	11	–	5	.688	13	–	10	.565
Lipscomb	8	–	6	.571	11	–	9	.550
Stetson	7	–	9	.438	9	–	12	.429
North Alabama*	6	–	9	.400	7	–	17	.292
Bellarmine*	5	–	11	.313	5	–	16	.238
Kennesaw State	2	–	11	.154	7	–	11	.389
Jacksonville	1	–	13	.071	3	–	16	.158
† 2021 ASUN Tournament winner * ineligible for the 2021 NCAA tournament due to transition period As of March 6, 2021; Rankings from AP poll

The 2021 ASUN women's basketball tournament was the 35th edition of the ASUN Conference championship. It took place March 10–14, 2021, in the KSU Convocation Center in Kennesaw, Georgia. Florida Gulf Coast won the tournament, its seventh title, receiving the league's automatic bid to the 2021 NCAA tournament.

== Seeds ==
Seed	School	Conference	Overall
1	Florida Gulf Coast	16–0	23–2
2	Liberty	12–4	17–7
3	North Florida	11–5	13–10
4	Lipscomb	8–6	11–9
5	Stetson	7–9	9–12
6	North Alabama	6–9	7–17
7	Bellarmine	5–11	5–16
8	Kennesaw State	2–11	7–11
9	Jacksonville	1–13	3–16

== Schedule ==
Game	Matchup	Time	Television	Score
First round – Wednesday, March 10
1	No. 9 Jacksonville vs. No. 8 Kennesaw State	2:00 pm	ESPN+	55–52
Quarterfinals – Thursday, March 11
2	No. 9 Jacksonville vs. No. 1 Florida Gulf Coast	2:00 pm	ESPN+	62–87
3	No. 5 Stetson vs. No. 4 Lipscomb	2:00 pm^{a}	ESPN+	47–50^{OT}
4	No. 6 North Alabama vs. No. 3 North Florida	7:00 pm^{a}	ESPN+	74–86
5	No. 7 Bellarmine vs. No. 2 Liberty	7:00 pm	ESPN+	59–88
Semifinals – Friday, March 12
6	No. 1 Florida Gulf Coast vs. No. 4 Lipscomb	2:00 pm	ESPN+	59–44
7	No. 3 North Florida vs. No. 2 Liberty	7:00 pm	ESPN+	52–65
Championship – Sunday, March 14
8	No. 1 Florida Gulf Coast vs. No. 2 Liberty	2:00 pm	ESPN+	84–62
*Game times in ET. Rankings denote tournament seeding. ^{a} denotes alternate KSU site.

== Bracket ==
First round March 10; ESPN+
8	Kennesaw State	52
9	Jacksonville	55

Quarterfinals; March 11; ESPN+
1	Florida Gulf Coast	87
9	Jacksonville	62
4	Lipscomb	50*
5	Stetson	47
3	North Florida	86
6	North Alabama	74
2	Liberty	88
7	Bellarmine	59

Semifinals; March 12; ESPN+
1	Florida Gulf Coast	59
4	Lipscomb	44
3	North Florida	52
2	Liberty	65

Championship; March 14; ESPN+
1	Florida Gulf Coast	84
2	Liberty	62

* denotes overtime

== See also ==
- 2020–21 NCAA Division I women's basketball season
- ASUN women's basketball tournament
- 2021 ASUN men's basketball tournament
