= 2019–20 BYU Cougars women's basketball team =

Intercollegiate basketball season

2019–20 BYU Cougars women's basketball
- Conference: West Coast Conference
- Record: 14–9 (9–4 WCC)
- Head coach: Jeff Judkins (19th season)
- Assistant coaches: Ray Stewart (9th season); Melanie Day (1st season); Lee Cummard (1st season)
- Home arena: Marriott Center

2019–20 West Coast Conference women's basketball standings
	Conf.				Overall
Team	W		L	PCT	W		L	PCT
No. 11 Gonzaga	17	–	1	.944	28	–	3	.903
San Diego	13	–	5	.722	20	–	11	.645
BYU	13	–	5	.722	18	–	11	.621
Portland †	11	–	7	.611	21	–	11	.656
Pacific	9	–	9	.500	17	–	14	.548
Pepperdine	8	–	10	.444	16	–	15	.516
Saint Mary's	6	–	12	.333	12	–	19	.387
San Francisco	5	–	13	.278	12	–	19	.387
Santa Clara	5	–	13	.278	12	–	19	.387
Loyola Marymount	3	–	15	.167	7	–	25	.219
† 2020 WCC tournament winner Rankings from AP poll

The 2019–20 BYU Cougars women's basketball team represented Brigham Young University during the 2019–20 NCAA Division I women's basketball season. It was head coach Jeff Judkins's nineteenth season at BYU. The Cougars, members of the West Coast Conference, played their home games at the Marriott Center.

== Before the season ==
=== Departures ===
Name	Number	Pos.	Height	Year	Hometown	Notes
Shaylee Gonzales	2	G	5'10	Freshman	Gilbert, Arizona	RS Medical
Abby Mangum	10	G	6'0	RS Freshman	Eagle, Idaho	Transferred to Westminster College
Caitlyn Alldredge	12	G	5'10"	Senior	Centerville, Utah	Graduated
Tahlia White	23	F	6'0	RS Freshman	Orem, Utah	Serving a Church Mission
Ashley Beckstrand	24	G	5'7	RS Freshman	St. George, Utah	Transferred to Dixie State

=== Newcomers ===
Name	Number	Pos.	Height	Year	Hometown	Notes
Kaylee Smiler	11	G	5'8	RS Freshman	Hamilton, New Zealand	
Lauren Gustin	12	F	6'1"	Sophomore	Salem, Utah	Transferred from Salt Lake Community College; Will Redshirt the season
Leilani Otuafi	20	G	5'9	Freshman	Fallon, Nevada	
Kyra Beckman	34	F	6'2	Freshman	Snohomish, Washington	

== 2019–20 media ==
=== BYU Sports Media ===
All Cougars home games are scheduled to be shown on BYUtv or on WCC Network (formerly TheW.tv). Conference road games will also be shown on WCC Network. Most regular season road games will be streamed. Streaming partners for those games can be found on the schedule.

== Roster ==
2019–20 BYU Cougars women's basketball team
Players
Coaches

Pos.	#	Name	Height	Year	Previous school	Hometown
G	1	Brenna Chase Drollinger	5 ft 8 in (1.73 m)	Sr	Broomfield	Thornton, CO
G	2	Shaylee Gonzales (redshirt)	5 ft 10 in (1.78 m)	So	Mesquite	Gilbert, AZ
F	3	Shalae Salmon	6 ft 3 in (1.91 m)	Sr	Wellington Girls' College	Porirua, New Zealand
G	5	Maria Albiero	5 ft 8 in (1.73 m)	Jr	Neusa Christian	Londrina, Brazil
F	11	Kaylee Smiler	5 ft 8 in (1.73 m)	RS Fr	Melville	Hamilton, New Zealand
F	12	Lauren Gustin (redshirt)	5 ft 8 in (1.73 m)	So	Salem Hills; Salt Lake CC; Idaho	Salem, UT
G	13	Paisley Johnson	5 ft 9 in (1.75 m)	Jr	Glacier Peak	Everett, WA
F	14	Babalu Ugwu	6 ft 0 in (1.83 m)	So	Friendship Christian	Judai, Sao Paulo, Brazil
F	15	Malli Valgardson Peri	6 ft 5 in (1.96 m)	RS So	Pleasant Grove	Pleasant Grove, UT
G	20	Leilani Otuafi	5 ft 9 in (1.75 m)	Fr	Churchill County	Fallon, NV
G	21	Khaedin Taito	5 ft 11 in (1.8 m)	RS Sr	Palm Beach Currumbin High School; USC	Hastings, New Zealand
C	22	Sara Hamson	6 ft 7 in (2.01 m)	Jr	Pleasant Grove	Lindon, UT
F	23	Tahlia White (redshirt)	6 ft 0 in (1.83 m)	Fr	Mountain View	Orem, UT
F	32	Signe Glantz	6 ft 1 in (1.85 m)	So	Lulea Gymnasie Skola	Östersund, Sweden
F	33	Jasmine Moody	6 ft 2 in (1.88 m)	RS Sr	Radford	Honolulu, HI
F	34	Kyra Beckman	6 ft 2 in (1.88 m)	Fr	Snohomish	Snohomish, WA

Head coach

- Jeff Judkins (Utah)

Assistant coach(es)

- Ray Stewart (Utah Valley)
- Melanie Day (BYU)
- Lee Cummard (BYU)
- Kim Gibb- Director of Operations (BYU)

Legend

- (C) Team captain
- (S) Suspended
- (I) Ineligible
- (W) Walk-on
- Injured
- Current redshirt

Roster

== Schedule ==
Date time, TV	Rank^{#}	Opponent^{#}	Result	Record	Site city, state
Exhibition
10/29/2019*; 7:00 pm, WCC Network		Westminster	W 69–61	–	Marriott Center; Provo, UT
11/02/2019*; 2:00 pm, WCC Network		Antelope Valley	W 105–52	–	Marriott Center; Provo, UT
Non-conference regular season
11/09/2019*; 2:00 pm, P12+ WSU		at Washington State	L 50–67	0–1	Beasley Coliseum; Pullman, WA
11/14/2019*; 7:00 pm, byutv.org		Texas A&M-Kingsville	W 90–38	1–1	Marriott Center; Provo, UT
11/21/2019*; 7:00 pm, MW Net		at Fresno State	W 71–65	2–1	Save Mart Center; Fresno, CA
11/26/2019*; 11:00 am, BYUtv		Utah State	W 67–50	3–1	Marriott Center; Provo, UT
11/29/2019*; 7:00 pm, BYUtv		Utah; Deseret First Duel	L 73–77 ^{OT}	3–2	Marriott Center; Provo, UT
12/06/2019*; 6:00 pm, P12+ ASU		at Arizona State	L 52–60	3–3	Desert Financial Arena; Tempe, AZ
12/11/2019*; 7:00 pm, MW Net		at Boise State	L 55–66	3–4	ExtraMile Arena; Boise, ID
12/14/2019*; 2:00 pm, BYUtv		Utah Valley; UCCU Crosstown Clash	W 71–57	4–4	Marriott Center; Provo, UT
12/18/2019*; 8:30 pm, BYUR		vs. San Jose State; Maui Jim Maui Classic	W 75–56	5–4	Lahaina Civic Center; Lahaina, HI
12/19/2019*; 10:30 pm, P12+ OSU		vs. No. 4 Oregon State; Maui Jim Maui Classic	L 34–65	5–5	Lahaina Civic Center; Lahaina, HI
WCC regular season
12/28/2019; 3:00 pm, WCC Network		at Loyola Marymount	W 59–44	6–5 (1–0)	Gersten Pavilion; Los Angeles, CA
12/30/2019; 3:00 pm, WCC Network		at Pepperdine	W 65–47	7–5 (2–0)	Firestone Fieldhouse; Malibu, CA
01/02/2020; 7:00 pm, BYUtv		No. 17 Gonzaga	L 43–55	7–6 (2–1)	Marriott Center; Provo, UT
01/04/2020; 2:00 pm, BYUtv		Portland	L 48–57	7–7 (2–2)	Marriott Center; Provo, UT
01/11/2020; 2:00 pm, BYUtv		San Diego	W 52–36	8–7 (3–2)	Marriott Center; Provo, UT
01/16/2020; 8:00 pm, WCC Network		at Pacific	W 76–66 ^{OT}	9–7 (4–2)	Alex G. Spanos Center; Stockton, CA
01/18/2020; 3:00 pm, WCC Network		at Saint Mary's	W 65–55	10–7 (5–2)	University Credit Union Pavilion; Moraga, CA
01/23/2020; 11:00 am, BYUtv		San Francisco	W 57–44	11–7 (6–2)	Marriott Center; Provo, UT
01/25/2020; 2:00 pm, BYUtv		Santa Clara	W 71–48	12–7 (7–2)	Marriott Center; Provo, UT
01/30/2020; 8:00 pm, WCC Network		at Portland	W 66–54	13–7 (8–2)	Chiles Center; Portland, OR
02/01/2020; 3:00 pm, WCC Network		at No. 12 Gonzaga	L 44–59	13–8 (8–3)	McCarthey Athletic Center; Spokane, WA
02/08/2020; 3:00 pm, WCC Network		at San Diego	L 45–51	13–9 (8–4)	Jenny Craig Pavilion; San Diego, CA
02/13/2020; 7:00 pm, BYUtv		Saint Mary's	W 60–39	14–9 (9–4)	Marriott Center; Provo, UT
02/15/2020; 2:00 pm, BYUtv		Pacific			Marriott Center; Provo, UT
02/20/2020; 8:00 pm, WCC Network		at Santa Clara			Leavey Center; Santa Clara, CA
02/22/2020; 2:00 pm, WCC Network		at San Francisco			The Sobrato Center; San Francisco, CA
02/27/2020; 7:00 pm, BYUtv		Pepperdine			Marriott Center; Provo, UT
02/29/2019; 2:00 pm, BYUtv		Loyola Marymount			Marriott Center; Provo, UT
WCC Tournament
TBA; TBA, BYUtv		vs.			Orleans Arena; Paradise, NV
*Non-conference game. ^{#}Rankings from AP Poll / Coaches' Poll. (#) Tournament seedings in parentheses. C=Chicago Region. All times are in Mountain.

== Game summaries ==
=== Exhibition: Westminster ===
Broadcasters: Jason Shepherd

Starting Lineups:

- Westminster: Abby Mangum, Mariah Martin, Sarah McGinley, Kaitlin Toluono, Hunter Krebs
- BYU: Brenna Drollinger, Maria Albiero, Paisley Johnson, Sara Hamson, Jasmine Moody

WCC Network

Oct. 29
7 p.m. MST

Recap

Westminster Griffins 61, BYU Cougars 69
Scoring by quarter: 23–17, 15–11, 13–17, 10–24
Pts: Sarah McGinley 22; Rebs: Sarah McGinley, Kaitlin Toluono 8 Asts: Mariah Martin 5	Pts: Shalae Salmon 16; Rebs: Jasmine Moody 10; Asts: Brenna Drollinger 6

Marriott Center
Provo, UT
Referees: Kyle Bacon, Teresa Turner, Brad Schmidt

=== Antelope Valley ===
Broadcasters: Mitchell Marshall

Starting Lineups:

- Antelope Valley: Ahjana Oakes, Serene Tyus, Tylen Price, Chinna Fair, Alexia Budd
- BYU: Brenna Drollinger, Maria Albiero, Paisley Johnson, Sara Hamson, Jasmine Moody

WCC Network

Nov. 2
2:05 p.m. MST

Recap

Antelope Valley Pioneers 52, BYU Cougars 105
Scoring by quarter: 10–25, 14–29, 13–29, 15–22
Pts: Serene Tyus 16; Rebs: Chinna Fair 8 Asts: Asia Young, Serene Tyus, Tylen Price, Alexia Budd 2	Pts: Jasmine Moody 15; Rebs: Shalae Salmon 7 Asts: Maria Albiero 8

Marriott Center
Provo, UT
Attendance: 370
Referees: Brenda Pantoja, Tiffany Bird, Matthew Head

=== Washington State ===
Broadcasters: Steve Grubbs

Series History: Series even 5–5
Starting Lineups:

- BYU: Brenna Drollinger, Maria Albiero, Paisley Johnson, Sara Hamson, Jasmine Moody
- Washington State: Emma Nankervis, Chanelle Molina, Shir Levy, Ula Motuga, Borislava Hristova

P12+ WSU

Nov. 9
1 p.m. PST

Recap

BYU Cougars 50, Washington State Cougars 67
Scoring by quarter: 8–10, 15–21, 17–18, 10–18
Pts: Paisley Johnson 19; Rebs: Jasmine Moody 8 Asts: Leilani Otuafi 4	Pts: Borislava Hristova 23; Rebs: Jovana Subasic 11; Asts: Cherilyn Molina 4

Beasley Coliseum
Pullman, WA
Attendance: 717
Referees: Not listed

=== Texas A&M-Kingsville ===
Broadcasters: Spencer Linton & Kristen Kozlowski

Series History: First Meeting
Starting Lineups:

- Texas A&M-Kingsville: Danielle Meador, Ravae Payne, Jalynn Johnson, Brynae Thompson, Maeghan Palmer
- BYU: Brenna Drollinger, Maria Albiero, Paisley Johnson, Sara Hamson, Jasmine Moody

byutv.org

Nov. 14
7:05 p.m. MST

Recap

Texas A&M-Kingsville Javelinas 38, BYU Cougars 90
Scoring by quarter: 3–23, 14–21, 12–27, 9–19
Pts: Daisah Purnell, Maeghan Palmer 8 Rebs: Ravae Payne, Daisah Purnell 5 Asts: Ravae Payne 3	Pts: Babalu Ugwu 12; Rebs: Sara Hamson 13; Asts: Maria Albiero 6

Marriott Center
Provo, UT
Attendance: 585
Referees: Darren Krzesnik, Lorena Ahumada, Jen Zylstra

=== Fresno State ===
Broadcasters: Matt Norville

Series History: BYU leads series 7–6
Starting Lineups:

- BYU: Brenna Drollinger, Shalae Salmon, Maria Albiero, Paisley Johnson, Sara Hamson
- Fresno State: Hanna Cavinder, Haley Cavinder, Madi Utti, Brooke Walling, Aly Gamez

MW Net

Nov. 21
6 p.m. PST

Recap

BYU Cougars 71, Fresno State Bulldogs 65
Scoring by quarter: 19–9, 17–15, 19–15, 16–26
Pts: Shalae Salmon 16; Rebs: Sara Hamson 14; Asts: Maria Albiero 5	Pts: Katelin Noyer 12; Rebs: Haley Cavinder 7 Asts: Haley Cavinder, Aly Gamez 3

Save Smart Center
Fresno, CA
Attendance: 2,115
Referees: Brenda Pantoja, Bob Scofield, Tiffany Bird

=== Utah State ===
Broadcasters: Spencer Linton & Kristen Kozlowski

Series History: BYU leads series 36–4
Starting Lineups:

- Utah State: Faith Brantley, Steph Gorman, Lindsey Jensen-Baker, Hailey Bassett, Marlene Aniambossou
- BYU: Brenna Drollinger, Shalae Salmon, Maria Albiero, Paisley Johnson, Sara Hamson

BYUtv

Nov. 26
11:05 a.m. MST

Recap

Utah State Aggies 50, BYU Cougars 67
Scoring by quarter: 13–16, 9–16, 10–14, 18–21
Pts: Lindsey Jensen-Baker 14; Rebs: Marlene Aniambossou 8 Asts: Steph Gorman 4	Pts: Brenna Drollinger 21; Rebs: Shalae Salmon, Sara Hamson 11; Asts: Maria Albiero, Paisley Johnson 4

Marriott Center
Provo, UT
Attendance: 5,804
Referees: Robert Scofield, Nicole Leon, Sha'Rae Mitchell

=== Utah ===
Broadcasters: Dave McCann & Kristen Kozlowski

Series History: Utah leads series 65–42
Starting Lineups:

- Utah: Dru Gylten, Brynna Maxwell, Lola Pendande, Kemery Martin, Ola Makurat
- BYU: Brenna Drollinger, Shalae Salmon, Maria Albiero, Paisley Johnson, Sara Hamson

BYUtv

Nov. 29
7 p.m. PST

Recap

Utah Utes 77, BYU Cougars 73 (OT)
Scoring by quarter: 17–20, 15–10, 19–22, 16–15, Overtime: 10–6
Pts: Brynna Maxwell 18; Rebs: Brynna Maxwell, Lola Pendande 7 Asts: Julie Brosseau 5	Pts: Paisley Johnson 19; Rebs: Shalae Salmon 12; Asts: Brenna Drollinger 7

Marriott Center
Provo, UT
Attendance: 1,117
Referees: Michael Price, Shelley Nakasone, Kenneth Nash

=== Arizona State ===
Broadcasters: Alexander Gaul, Sophia Elenga, & Misha Jones

Series History: BYU leads series 6–3
Starting Lineups:

- BYU: Brenna Drollinger, Shalae Salmon, Maria Albiero, Paisley Johnson, Sara Hamson
- Arizona State: Taya Hanson, Reili Richardson, Robbi Ryan, Jayde Van Hyfte, Ja'Tavia Tapley

P12+ ASU

Dec. 6
6:00 p.m. MST

Recap

BYU Cougars 52, Arizona State Sundevils 60
Scoring by quarter: 16–10, 7–7, 10–24, 19–19
Pts: Paisley Johnson 18; Rebs: Brenna Drollinger 8 Asts: Brenna Drollinger 6	Pts: Reili Richardson 15; Rebs: Ja'Tavia Tapley 18; Asts: Ja'Tavia Tapley 5

Deseret Financial Arena
Tempe, AZ
Attendance: 2,373
Referees: Charles Gonzales, InFini Robinson, Kimberly Hobbs

=== Boise State ===
Broadcasters: Chris Lewis

Series History: BYU leads series 11–7
Starting Lineups:

- BYU: Brenna Drollinger, Shalae Salmon, Maria Albiero, Paisley Johnson, Sara Hamson
- Boise State: Braydey Hodgins, Riley Lupfer, Jayde Christopher, A'Shanti Coleman, Mallory McGwire

MW Net

Dec. 11
7 p.m. MST

Recap

BYU Cougars 55, Boise State Broncos 66
Scoring by quarter: 13–19, 10–8, 22–24, 10–15
Pts: Paisley Johnson 18; Rebs: Shalae Salmon 11; Asts: Brenna Drollinger, Maria Albiero 5	Pts: A'Shanti Coleman 19; Rebs: Mallory McGwire 14; Asts: Jayde Christopher 7

ExtraMile Arena
Boise, ID
Attendance: 1,140
Referees: Lisa Jones, Brenda Pantoja, Melissa Barlow

=== Utah Valley ===
Broadcasters: Spencer Linton, Kristen Kozlowski, & Jason Shepherd

Series History: BYU leads series 9–0
Starting Lineups:

- Utah Valley: Maria Carvalho, Eve Braslis, Nehaa Sohail, Jordan Holland, Josie Williams
- BYU: Brenna Drollinger, Shalae Salmon, Maria Albiero, Paisley Johnson, Sara Hamson

BYUtv

Dec. 14
2:00 p.m. MST

Recap

Utah Valley Wolverines 57, BYU Cougars 71
Scoring by quarter: 17–17, 19–20, 10–20, 11–14
Pts: Maria Carvalho 10; Rebs: Maria Carvalho 9 Asts: Maria Carvalho 5	Pts: Brenna Drollinger 19; Rebs: Brenna Drollinger, Babalu Ugwu 7 Asts: Paisley Johnson 6

Marriott Center
Provo, UT
Attendance: 879
Referees: InFini Robinson, Tyler Trimble, Deon Lewis

=== San Jose State ===
Broadcasters: Spencer Linton (BYU Radio)

Series History: BYU leads series 3–2
Starting Lineups:

- San Jose State: Raziya Potter, Fieme'a Hafoka, Tyra Whitehead, Danae Marquez, Megan Anderson
- BYU: Brenna Drollinger, Shalae Salmon, Maria Albiero, Paisley Johnson, Sara Hamson

Dec. 18
5:30 p.m. HAST

Recap

San Jose State Spartans 56, BYU Cougars 75
Scoring by quarter: 10–19, 17–27, 11–11, 18–18
Pts: Cydni Lewis 18; Rebs: Tyra Whitehead 7 Asts: Danae Marquez 4	Pts: Paisley Johnson 20; Rebs: Brenna Drollinger, Shalae Salmon 8 Asts: Brenna Drollinger 7

Lahaina Civic Center
Lahaina, HI
Attendance: 820
Referees: Melissa Barlow, Benny Luna, Corey Long

=== Oregon State ===
Broadcasters: Ron Callan (P12+ OSU)
Spencer Linton (BYU Radio)

Series History: Oregon State leads series 6–4
Starting Lineups:

- BYU: Brenna Drollinger, Shalae Salmon, Maria Albiero, Paisley Johnson, Sara Hamson
- Oregon State: Mikayla Pivec, Aleah Goodman, Destiny Slocum, Kennedy Brown, Taylor Jones

P12+ OSU

Dec. 19
7:30 p.m. HAST

Recap

BYU Cougars 34, #4 Oregon State Beavers 65
Scoring by quarter: 11–4, 6–24, 13–17, 4–20
Pts: Brenna Drollinger 14; Rebs: Jasmine Moody 10; Asts: Khaedin Taito 2	Pts: Destiny Slocum 18; Rebs: Mikayla Picec 9 Asts: Aleah Goodman 7

Lahaina Civic Center
Lahaina, HI
Attendance: 711
Referees: Brenda Pantoja, Benny Luna, Nicole Leon

=== Loyola Marymount ===
Broadcasters: No commentary

Series History: BYU leads series 15–2
Starting Lineups:

- BYU: Brenna Drollinger, Maria Albiero, Paisley Johnson, Sara Hamson, Jasmine Moody
- Loyola Marymount: Aspyn Adams, Ciera Ellington, Chelsey Gipson, Raychel Stanley, Meghan Mandel

WCC Network

Dec. 28
2:00 p.m. PST

Recap

BYU Cougars 59, Loyola Marymount Lions 44
Scoring by quarter: 21–12, 10–8, 14–9, 14–15
Pts: Paisley Johnson 16; Rebs: Sara Hamson 12; Asts: Brenna Drollinger 4	Pts: Chelsey Gipson 10; Rebs: Chelsey Gipson 6 Asts: Chelsey Gipson, Raychel Stanley, Brittney Reed 2

Gersten Pavilion
Los Angeles, CA
Attendance: 256
Referees: Not listed

=== Pepperdine ===
Broadcasters: Darren Preston

Series History: BYU leads series 19–3
Starting Lineups:

- BYU: Brenna Drollinger, Maria Albiero, Paisley Johnson, Sara Hamson, Jasmine Moody
- Pepperdine: Malia Bambrick, Paige Fecske, Monique Andriuolo, Barbara Sitanggan, Hannah Friend

WCC Network

Dec. 30
2:00 p.m. PST

Recap

BYU Cougars 65, Pepperdine Waves 47
Scoring by quarter: 16–15, 14–11, 17–8, 18–13
Pts: Sara Hamson 13; Rebs: Babalu Ugwu 11; Asts: Brenna Drollinger 7	Pts: Barbara Sitanggan 12; Rebs: Monique Andriuolo, Barbara Sitanggan 8 Asts: Barbara Sitanggan 4

Firestone Fieldhouse
Malibu, CA
Attendance: 142
Referees: Charles Gonzales, Felicity Willis, Shante Anderson

=== Gonzaga ===
Broadcasters: Spencer Linton, Kristen Kozlowski, & Jason Shepherd

Series History: Gonzaga leads series 15–12
Starting Lineups:

- Gonzaga: Jenn Wirth, LeeAnne Wirth, Jessie Lorea, Katie Campbell
- BYU: Brenna Drollinger, Maria Albiero, Paisley Johnson, Sara Hamson, Jasmine Moody

BYUtv

Jan. 2
7:00 p.m. MST

Recap

#16 Gonzaga Bulldogs 55, BYU Cougars 43
Scoring by quarter: 28–12, 14–6, 12–15, 11–10
Pts: Katie Campbell 11; Rebs: Katie Campbell, Melody Kempton 6 Asts: Jessie Lorea 3	Pts: Babalu Ugwu 10; Rebs: Babalu Ugwu 11; Asts: Maria Drollinger 4

Marriott Center
Provo, UT
Attendance: 894
Referees: Brenda Pantoja, Cheryl Flores, Tyler Trimble

=== Portland ===
Broadcasters: Spencer Linton, Kristen Kozlowski, & Jason Shepherd

Series History: BYU leads series 24–4
Starting Lineups:

- Portland: Kate Andersen, Haylee Andrews, Alex Fowler, Maddie Muhlheim, Lauren Walker
- BYU: Brenna Drollinger, Maria Albiero, Paisley Johnson, Sara Hamson, Jasmine Moody

BYUtv

Jan. 4
2:00 p.m. MST

Recap

Portland Pilots 57, BYU Cougars 48
Scoring by quarter: 7–13, 22–9, 16–7, 12–19
Pts: Keeley Frawley 14; Rebs: Alex Fowler 8 Asts: Kate Andersen, Maddie Muhlheim, Keeley Frawley 4	Pts: Paisley Johnson 14; Rebs: Sara Hamson 13; Asts: Brenna Drollinger, Maria Albiero 4

Marriott Center
Provo, UT
Attendance: 858
Referees: Karen Lasuik, Kimberly Hobbs, Sean Martin

=== San Diego ===
Broadcasters: Spencer Linton & Kristen Kozlowski

Series History: BYU leads series 12–6
Starting Lineups:

- San Diego: Myah Pace, Madison Pollock, Jordyn Edwards, Sydney Hunter, Patricia Brossman
- BYU: Brenna Drollinger, Maria Albiero, Paisley Johnson, Babalu Ugwu, Sara Hamson

BYUtv

Jan. 11
2:00 p.m. MST

Recap

San Diego Toreros 36, BYU Cougars 52
Scoring by quarter: 12–10, 12–16, 7–11, 5–15
Pts: Jordyn Edwards 9 Rebs: Myah Pace, Patricia Brossman 10; Asts: Jordyn Edwards 4	Pts: Brenna Drollinger 13; Rebs: Brenna Drollinger, Shalae Salmon 6 Asts: Brenna Drollinger 9

Marriott Center
Provo, UT
Attendance: 803
Referees: Melissa Barlow, Cheryll Blue, Lucy Banuelos

=== Pacific ===
Broadcasters: Don Gubbins

Series History: BYU leads series 13–4
Starting Lineups:

- BYU: Brenna Drollinger, Maria Albiero, Paisley Johnson, Babalu Ugwu, Sara Hamson
- Pacific: Brooklyn McDavid, Jessica Blakeslee, Kaylin Randhawa, Valerie Higgins, Lianna Tillman

WCC Network

Jan. 16
7:00 p.m. PST

Recap

BYU Cougars 76, Pacific Tigers 66 (OT)
Scoring by quarter: 14–11, 20–22, 16–13, 14–18, Overtime: 12–2
Pts: Paisley Johnson 31; Rebs: Sara Hamson 12; Asts: Brenna Drollinger, Paisley Johnson 5	Pts: Brooklyn McDavid 19; Rebs: Valerie Higgins 8 Asts: Valerie Higgins, Lianna Tillman 4

Alex G. Spanos Center
Stockton, CA
Attendance: 591
Referees: Richard Waters, Nicole Leon, Rochelle Bennett

=== Saint Mary's ===
Broadcasters: Brandon Gutierrez

Series History: Saint Mary's leads series 10–9
Starting Lineups:

- BYU: Brenna Drollinger, Maria Albiero, Babalu Ugwu, Leilani Otuafi, Sara Hamson
- Saint Mary's: Taycee Wedin, Madeline Holland, Tyra Moe, Sam Simons, Brianna Simonich

WCC Network

Jan. 18
2:00 p.m. PT

Recap

BYU Cougars 65, Saint Mary's Gaels 55
Scoring by quarter: 17–20, 15–10, 18–17, 15–8
Pts: Kaylee Smiler 19; Rebs: Maria Albiero, Kaylee Smiler 6 Asts: Maria Albiero 4	Pts: Taycee Wedin 16; Rebs: Sam Aimons 13; Asts: Madeline Holland, Tyra Moe, Sam Simons, Brianna Simonich 3

University Credit Union Pavilion
Moraga, CA
Attendance: 392
Referees: Robert Schofield, Benny Luna, Alejandro Moreno

=== San Francisco ===
Broadcasters: Spencer Linton & Kristen Kozlowski

Series History: BYU leads series 19–5
Starting Lineups:

- San Francisco: Mikayla Williams, Kia Vaalavirta, Lucie Hoskova, Leilah Vigil, Abby Rathbun
- BYU: Brenna Drollinger, Maria Albiero, Paisley Johnson, Babalu Ugwu, Sara Hamson

BYUtv

Jan. 23
11:00 a.m. MST

Recap

San Francisco Dons 44, BYU Cougars 57
Scoring by quarter: 11–7, 6–20, 14–21, 13–9
Pts: Mikayla Williams 15; Rebs: Leilah Vigil 9 Asts: Lucie Hoskova 4	Pts: Jasmine Moody 11; Rebs: Babalu Ugwu 7 Asts: Paisley Johnson 6

Marriott Center
Provo, UT
Attendance: 5,804
Referees: InFini Robinson, Kaili Kamura, Ken Nash

=== Santa Clara ===
Broadcasters: Spencer Linton & Kristen Kozlowski

Series History: BYU leads series 17–2
Starting Lineups:

- Santa Clara: Addi Walters, Naomi Jimenez, Ashlyn Herlihy, Lindsey VanAllen, Emily Wolph
- BYU: Brenna Drollinger, Maria Albiero, Paisley Johnson, Babalu Ugwu, Sara Hamson

BYUtv

Jan. 25
2:00 p.m. MST

Recap

Santa Clara Broncos 48, BYU Cougars 71
Scoring by quarter: 9–14, 13–17, 14–20, 12–20
Pts: Lindsey VanAllen 16; Rebs: Ashlyn Herlihy 11; Asts: Lexie Pritchard 3	Pts: Sara Hamson 15; Rebs: Sara Hamson 7 Asts: Brenna Drollinger, Paisley Johnson 4

Marriott Center
Provo, UT
Attendance: 1,024
Referees: Brenda Pantoja, Lorena Ahumada, Brad Schmidt

=== Portland ===
Broadcasters: Bryan Sleik & Jazmine Dallas

Series History: BYU leads series 24–5
Starting Lineups:

- BYU: Brenna Drollinger, Maria Albiero, Paisley Johnson, Babalu Ugwu, Sara Hamson
- Portland: Kate Andersen, Haylee Andrews, Alex Fowler, Maddie Muhlheim, Lauren Walker

WCC Network

Jan. 30
7:00 p.m. PST

Recap

BYU Cougars 66, Portland Pilots 54
Scoring by quarter: 14–10, 16–21, 21–12, 15–11
Pts: Sara Hamson 14; Rebs: Sara Hamson 10; Asts: Brenna Drollinger, Maria Albiero 6	Pts: Alex Fowler 17; Rebs: Haylee Andrews, Alex Fowler 8 Asts: Kate Andersen, Haylee Andrews, Maddie Muhlheim 3

Chiles Center
Portland, OR
Attendance: 886
Referees: Melissa Barlow, Corey Long, Cheryll Blue

=== Gonzaga ===
Broadcasters: Sam Adams & Michelle Clark

Series History: Gonzaga leads series 16–12
Starting Lineups:

- BYU: Brenna Drollinger, Maria Albiero, Paisley Johnson, Babalu Ugwu, Sara Hamson
- Gonzaga: Jenn Wirth, LeeAnne Wirth, Jessie Loera, Katie Campbell, Jill Townsend

SWX
WCC Network

Feb. 1
2:00 p.m. PST

Recap

BYU Cougars 44, #12 Gonzaga Bulldogs 59
Scoring by quarter: 10–7, 15–19, 9–14, 10–19
Pts: Brenna Drollinger 24; Rebs: Sara Hamson 9 Asts: Kaylee Smiler 2	Pts: Katie Campbell 17; Rebs: Jenn Wirth 6 Asts: Kayleigh Truong 5

McCarthy Athletic Center
Spokane, WA
Attendance: 6,000
Referees: Anita Ortega, Benny Luna, Cathi Cornell

=== San Diego ===
Broadcasters: Paula Bott

Series History: BYU leads series 13–6
Starting Lineups:

- BYU: Brenna Drollinger, Maria Albiero, Paisley Johnson, Babalu Ugwu, Sara Hamson
- San Diego: Myah Pace, Madison Pollock, Jordyn Edwards, Sydney Hunter, Patricia Brossman

WCC Network

Feb. 8
2:00 p.m. PST

Recap

BYU Cougars 45, San Diego Toreros 51
Scoring by quarter: 6–8, 10–9, 17–14, 12–20
Pts: Paisley Johnson 19; Rebs: Sara Hamson 10; Asts: Brenna Drollinger 3	Pts: Leticia Soares 13; Rebs: Leticia Soares 10; Asts: Myah Pace, Jordyn Edwards 4

Jenny Craig Pavilion
San Diego, CA
Attendance: 344
Referees: Karen Lasuik, Teresa Turner, Marc Merritt

=== Saint Mary's ===
Broadcasters: Spencer Linton & Kristen Kozlowski

Series History: Series even 10–10
Starting Lineups:

- Saint Mary's: Taycee Wedin, Madeline Holland, Sam Simons, Brianna Simonich, Claire Ferguson
- BYU: Brenna Drollinger, Maria Albiero, Paisley Johnson, Babalu Ugwu, Sara Hamson

BYUtv

Feb. 13
7:00 p.m. MST

Recap

Saint Mary's Gaels 39, BYU Cougars 60
Scoring by quarter: 7–25, 7–11, 9–11, 16–13
Pts: Sam Simons 10; Rebs: Brianna Simonich, Claire Ferguson 8 Asts: Sam Simons 3	Pts: Brenna Drollinger 18; Rebs: Brenna Drollinger 8 Asts: Brenna Drollinger, Maria Albiero 5

Marriott Center
Provo, UT
Attendance: 1,067
Referees: Kyle Bacon, InFini Robinson, Shantae Anderson

=== Pacific ===
Broadcasters:

Series History: BYU leads series 14–4
Starting Lineups:

- Pacific:
- BYU:

BYUtv

Feb. 15
2:00 p.m. MST

Pacific Tigers vs. BYU Cougars

Marriott Center
Provo, UT

=== Santa Clara ===
Broadcasters:

Series History: BYU leads series 18–2
Starting Lineups:

- BYU:
- Santa Clara:

WCC Network

Feb. 20
7:00 p.m. PST

BYU Cougars vs. Santa Clara Broncos

Leavey Center
Santa Clara, CA

=== San Francisco ===
Broadcasters: George Devine & Amy Touli

Series History: BYU leads series 20–5
Starting Lineups:

- BYU:
- San Francisco:

WCC Network

Feb. 22
1:00 p.m. PST

BYU Cougars vs. San Francisco Dons

The Sobrato Center
San Francisco, CA

=== Pepperdine ===
Broadcasters:

Series History: BYU leads series 20–3
Starting Lineups:

- Pepperdine:
- BYU:

BYUtv

Feb. 27
7:00 p.m. MST

Pepperdine Waves vs. BYU Cougars

Marriott Center
Provo, UT

=== Loyola Marymount ===
Broadcasters:

Series History: BYU leads series 16–2
Starting Lineups:

- Loyola Marymount:
- BYU:

BYUtv

Feb. 29
2:00 p.m. MST

Loyola Marymount Lions vs. BYU Cougars

Marriott Center
Provo, UT

== Rankings ==
2019–20 NCAA Division I women's basketball rankings

+ Regular season polls	Poll	Pre- Season	Week 2	Week 3	Week 4	Week 5	Week 6	Week 7	Week 8	Week 9	Week 10	Week 11	Week 12	Week 13	Week 14	Week 15	Week 16	Week 17	Week 18	Week 19	Final
AP																					
Coaches																					

Legend
	Increase in ranking
	Decrease in ranking
	No change
(RV)	Received votes
(NR)	Not ranked
