= 2019–20 Gonzaga Bulldogs women's basketball team =

American college basketball season

2019–20 Gonzaga Bulldogs women's basketball

Gulf Coast Showcase champions WCC regular season champions
- Conference: West Coast Conference

Ranking
- Coaches: No. 11
- AP: No. 11
- Record: 28–3 (17–1 WCC)
- Head coach: Lisa Fortier (6th season)
- Assistant coaches: Jordan Green; Stacy Clinesmith; Craig Fortier
- Home arena: McCarthey Athletic Center

2019–20 West Coast Conference women's basketball standings
	Conf.				Overall
Team	W		L	PCT	W		L	PCT
No. 11 Gonzaga	17	–	1	.944	28	–	3	.903
San Diego	13	–	5	.722	20	–	11	.645
BYU	13	–	5	.722	18	–	11	.621
Portland †	11	–	7	.611	21	–	11	.656
Pacific	9	–	9	.500	17	–	14	.548
Pepperdine	8	–	10	.444	16	–	15	.516
Saint Mary's	6	–	12	.333	12	–	19	.387
San Francisco	5	–	13	.278	12	–	19	.387
Santa Clara	5	–	13	.278	12	–	19	.387
Loyola Marymount	3	–	15	.167	7	–	25	.219
† 2020 WCC tournament winner Rankings from AP poll

The 2019–20 Gonzaga Bulldogs women's basketball team represented Gonzaga University in the 2019–20 NCAA Division I women's basketball season. The Bulldogs (also informally referred to as the "Zags"), were members of the West Coast Conference. The Bulldogs, led by sixth year head coach Lisa Fortier, played their home games at the McCarthey Athletic Center on the university campus in Spokane, Washington.

== Roster ==
2019–20 Gonzaga Bulldogs women's basketball team
Players
Coaches

Pos.	#	Name	Height	Year	Previous school	Hometown
F	1	Anamaria Virjoghe	6 ft 5 in (1.96 m)	RS So	Voievodul Mercea; Northwest Christian	Târgoviște, Romania
F	3	Jenn Wirth	6 ft 3 in (1.91 m)	Jr	Seton Catholic	Chandler, AZ
F	4	LeeAnne Wirth	6 ft 3 in (1.91 m)	Jr	Seton Catholic	Chandler, AZ
G	5	Louise Forsyth	6 ft 0 in (1.83 m)	Jr	Brookswood Secondary	Langley, BC
F	10	Gillian Barfield	6 ft 1 in (1.85 m)	Jr	Phoenix Country Day School	Phoenix, AZ
G	11	Kayleigh Truong	5 ft 9 in (1.75 m)	Fr	Jersey Village	Houston, TX
F	12	Eliza Hollingsworth	6 ft 2 in (1.88 m)	Fr	St Leonard's College	Melbourne, Australia
G	13	Cierra Walker (redshirt)	5 ft 8 in (1.73 m)	Sr	Oregon City; Vanderbilt	Oregon City, OR
G	14	Kaylynne Truong	5 ft 8 in (1.73 m)	Fr	Jersey Village	Houston, TX
G	15	Jessie Loera	5 ft 6 in (1.68 m)	Sr	Moses Lake	Moses Lake, WA
G	24	Katie Campbell	5 ft 10 in (1.78 m)	Sr	Ventura; Ventura College	Oxnard, CA
G	32	Jill Townsend	5 ft 11 in (1.8 m)	Jr	Okanogan	Okanogan, WA
F	33	Melody Kempton	6 ft 1 in (1.85 m)	So	Post Falls	Post Falls, ID
G	44	Kylee Griffen	6 ft 2 in (1.88 m)	RS Fr	Lake Stevens	Marysville, WA

Head coach

- Lisa Fortier (Cal State Monterey)

Assistant coach(es)

- Jordan Green (George Fox)
- Stacy Clinesmith (UC Santa Barbara)
- Craig Fortier (Cal State Monterey)

Legend

- (C) Team captain
- (S) Suspended
- (I) Ineligible
- (W) Walk-on
- Injured
- Current redshirt

Roster

== Schedule ==
Date time, TV	Rank^{#}	Opponent^{#}	Result	Record	Site (attendance) city, state
Exhibition
Nov 2, 2019*; 2:00 pm		Warner Pacific	W 105–45		McCarthey Athletic Center; Spokane, WA
Non-conference regular season
Nov 10, 2019*; 2:00 pm		Cal State Bakersfield	W 92–48	1–0	McCarthey Athletic Center (5,349); Spokane, WA
Nov 14, 2019*; 7:30 pm, SWX		UT Martin	W 78–55	2–0	McCarthey Athletic Center (5,255); Spokane, WA
Nov 17, 2019*; 5:00 pm		at No. 3 Stanford	L 70–76 ^{OT}	2–1	Maples Pavilion (2,863); Stanford, CA
Nov 22, 2019*; 6:00 pm, SWX	No. 23	Eastern Washington	W 84–44	3–1	McCarthey Athletic Center (6,000); Spokane, WA
Nov 29, 2019*; 10:30 am	No. 22	vs. Dayton; Gulf Coast Showcase Quarterfinals	W 76–65	4–1	Hertz Arena (411); Estero, FL
Nov 30, 2019*; 2:00 pm	No. 22	vs. Middle Tennessee; Gulf Coast Showcase semifinals	W 62–50	5–1	Hertz Arena (397); Estero, FL
Dec 1, 2019*; 4:30 pm	No. 22	vs. Purdue; Gulf Coast Showcase championship	W 63–50	6–1	Hertz Arena (517); Estero, FL
Dec 5, 2019*; 5:00 pm, SWX	No. 18	at Montana State	W 70–55	7–1	Brick Breeden Fieldhouse (2,837); Bozeman, MT
Dec 8, 2019*; 2:00 pm	No. 18	at Washington State	W 76–53	8–1	Beasley Coliseum (1,332); Pullman, WA
Dec 15, 2019*; 2:00 pm	No. 17	Texas Southern	W 80–45	9–1	McCarthey Athletic Center (5,371); Spokane, WA
Dec 17, 2019*; 5:30 pm	No. 17	at Wyoming	W 65–54	10–1	Arena-Auditorium (2,432); Laramie, WY
Dec 20, 2019*; 6:00 pm, SWX	No. 17	No. 20 Missouri State	W 64–52	11–1	McCarthey Athletic Center (5,570); Spokane, WA
WCC regular season
Dec 29, 2019; 1:00 pm	No. 17	Portland	W 62–57	12–1 (1–0)	McCarthey Athletic Center (6,000); Spokane, WA
Jan 2, 2020; 6:00 pm	No. 17	at BYU	W 55–43	13–1 (2–0)	Marriott Center (894); Provo, UT
Jan 4, 2020; 2:00 pm	No. 17	at San Diego	W 57–42	14–1 (3–0)	Jenny Craig Pavilion (386); San Diego, CA
Jan 9, 2020; 6:00 pm	No. 16	Saint Mary's	W 74–49	15–1 (4–0)	McCarthey Athletic Center (5,611); Spokane, WA
Jan 11, 2020; 2:00 pm, SWX	No. 16	Pacific	W 68–67	16–1 (5–0)	McCarthey Athletic Center (5,639); Spokane, WA
Jan 16, 2020; 7:00 pm	No. 16	at Santa Clara	W 67–52	17–1 (6–0)	Leavey Center (301); Santa Clara, CA
Jan 18, 2020; 5:00 pm	No. 16	at San Francisco	W 69–46	18–1 (7–0)	War Memorial Gymnasium (406); San Francisco, CA
Jan 23, 2020; 6:00 pm	No. 13	Pepperdine	W 70–36	19–1 (8–0)	McCarthey Athletic Center (5,355); Spokane, WA
Jan 25, 2020; 1:00 pm	No. 13	Loyola Marymount	W 78–52	20–1 (9–0)	McCarthey Athletic Center (6,000); Spokane, WA
Jan 30, 2020; 6:00 pm	No. 12	San Diego	W 57–46	21–1 (10–0)	McCarthey Athletic Center (5,596); Spokane, WA
Feb 1, 2020; 2:00 pm, SWX	No. 12	BYU	W 59–44	22–1 (11–0)	McCarthey Athletic Center (6,000); Spokane, WA
Feb 6, 2020; 2:00 pm	No. 11	at Pacific	W 83–65	23–1 (12–0)	Alex G. Spanos Center (518); Stockton, CA
Feb 8, 2020; 2:00 pm	No. 11	at Saint Mary's	L 60–70	23–2 (12–1)	University Credit Union Pavilion (569); Moraga, CA
Feb 13, 2020; 7:00 pm	No. 15	San Francisco	W 56–38	24–2 (13–1)	McCarthey Athletic Center (6,000); Spokane, WA
Feb 15, 2020; 2:00 pm, SWX	No. 15	Santa Clara	W 53–46	25–2 (14–1)	McCarthey Athletic Center (6,000); Spokane, WA
Feb 20, 2020; 7:00 pm	No. 13	at Loyola Marymount	W 75–47	26–2 (15–1)	Gersten Pavilion (322); Los Angeles, CA
Feb 22, 2020; 2:00 pm	No. 13	at Pepperdine	W 64–50	27–2 (16–1)	Firestone Fieldhouse (406); Malibu, CA
Feb 29, 2020; 2:00 pm	No. 11	at Portland	W 56–42	28–2 (17–1)	Chiles Center (1,709); Portland, OR
WCC Women's Tournament
Mar 9, 2020; 12:00 pm, BYU TV/RTNW	(1) No. 11	vs. (4) Portland; Semifinals	L 69–70	28-3	Orleans Arena; Paradise, NV
*Non-conference game. ^{#}Rankings from AP Poll. (#) Tournament seedings in parentheses. All times are in Pacific Time.

== Rankings ==
2019–20 NCAA Division I women's basketball rankings

+ Regular season polls	Poll	Pre- Season	Week 2	Week 3	Week 4	Week 5	Week 6	Week 7	Week 8	Week 9	Week 10	Week 11	Week 12	Week 13	Week 14	Week 15	Week 16	Week 17	Week 18	Week 19	Final
AP	RV	RV	23-T	22	18	17	17	17	17	16	16	13	12	11	15	13	11	12	11	N/A	
Coaches	23	23^	21	21	17	17	18	17	16	15	13-T	11	11	11	15	13	10	11			

Legend
	Increase in ranking
	Decrease in ranking
	No change
(RV)	Received votes
(NR)	Not ranked

^Coaches did not release a Week 2 poll.

== See also ==
- 2019–20 Gonzaga Bulldogs men's basketball team
