= 2019–20 Portland Pilots women's basketball team =

American college basketball season

2019–20 Portland Pilots women's basketball
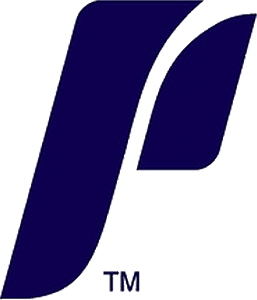

WCC Tournament champions

NCAA Women's Tournament
- Conference: West Coast Conference
- Record: 21–11 (11–7 WCC)
- Head coach: Michael Meek (1st season)
- Assistant coaches: Tom Batsell; Skyler Young; Sharon Rissmiller
- Home arena: Chiles Center

2019–20 West Coast Conference women's basketball standings
	Conf.				Overall
Team	W		L	PCT	W		L	PCT
No. 11 Gonzaga	17	–	1	.944	28	–	3	.903
San Diego	13	–	5	.722	20	–	11	.645
BYU	13	–	5	.722	18	–	11	.621
Portland †	11	–	7	.611	21	–	11	.656
Pacific	9	–	9	.500	17	–	14	.548
Pepperdine	8	–	10	.444	16	–	15	.516
Saint Mary's	6	–	12	.333	12	–	19	.387
San Francisco	5	–	13	.278	12	–	19	.387
Santa Clara	5	–	13	.278	12	–	19	.387
Loyola Marymount	3	–	15	.167	7	–	25	.219
† 2020 WCC tournament winner Rankings from AP poll

The 2019–20 Portland Pilots women's basketball team represented the University of Portland in the 2019–20 NCAA Division I women's basketball season. The Pilots were led by first year coach Michael Meek. They played their homes games at Chiles Center and are members of the West Coast Conference.

== Roster ==
2019–20 Portland Pilots women's basketball team
Players
Coaches

Pos.	#	Name	Height	Year	Previous school	Hometown
G	1	Kate Anderson	5 ft 9 in (1.75 m)	Sr	Jesuit HS	Portland, OR
G	2	Rose Pflug (redshirt)	5 ft 11 in (1.8 m)	Jr	Sunset; Pepperdine	Portland, OR
G	3	Josie Matz	5 ft 10 in (1.78 m)	Jr	Wilson HS	Tacoma, WA
F	4	Keeley Frawley	6 ft 0 in (1.83 m)	Fr	Haileybury College	Melbourne, Australia
G	10	Haylee Andrews	5 ft 9 in (1.75 m)	So	Townsville State HS	Townsville, Australia
F	12	Alex Fowler	6 ft 1 in (1.85 m)	Fr	St Margaret Mary's College	Townsville, Australia
F	14	Jayce Gorzeman	6 ft 0 in (1.83 m)	Jr	Mayfield HS	Las Cruces, NM
G	15	Maddie Muhlheim	5 ft 7 in (1.7 m)	Jr	Sunset HS	Portland, OR
F	22	Kristina Wooldridge	6 ft 2 in (1.88 m)	Jr	Bishop O'Dowd HS	San Leandro, CA
F	23	Liana Kaitu'u	6 ft 0 in (1.83 m)	So	East HS	Salt Lake City, UT
G	32	Kelsey Lenzie	5 ft 7 in (1.7 m)	Fr	West Seattle HS	Seattle, WA
G	33	Megan Engesser	5 ft 10 in (1.78 m)	Fr	Colorado Springs Christian HS	Colorado Springs, CO
F	35	Shasta Parker	6 ft 1 in (1.85 m)	So	San Martin HS	Novato, CA
C	44	Lauren Walker	6 ft 5 in (1.96 m)	Jr	Cardinal Newman HS	Windsor, CA

Head coach

- Michael Meek (Eastern Oregon)

Assistant coach(es)

- Tom Batsell (Pacific)
- Skyler Young (Western Michigan)
- Sharon Rissmiller (Portland)

Legend

- (C) Team captain
- (S) Suspended
- (I) Ineligible
- (W) Walk-on
- Injured
- Current redshirt

Roster

== Schedule and results ==
Date time, TV	Rank^{#}	Opponent^{#}	Result	Record	Site (attendance) city, state
Exhibition
Nov 2, 2019*; 5:00 pm		Lewis & Clark	W 92–30		Chiles Center (150); Portland, OR
Non-conference regular season
Nov 7, 2019*; 10:00 am		at Utah State	W 70–64	1–0	Smith Spectrum (2,600); Logan, UT
Nov 9, 2019*; 6:00 pm		at Weber State	W 78–59	2–0	Dee Events Center (572); Ogden, UT
Nov 13, 2019*; 11:00 am		Warner Pacific	W 78–36	3–0	Chiles Center (744); Portland, OR
Nov 17, 2019*; 1:00 pm		Fresno State	W 75–64	4–0	Chiles Center (687); Portland, OR
Nov 21, 2019*; 12:00 pm		at Cal State Northridge	L 64–73	4–1	Matadome (1,606); Northridge, CA
Nov 23, 2019*; 1:00 pm		at Air Force	W 72–56	5–1	Clune Arena (227); Colorado Springs, CO
Nov 29, 2019*; 2:00 pm		Abilene Christian	L 69–76	5–2	Chiles Center (327); Portland, OR
Dec 1, 2019*; 2:00 pm		Loyola–Chicago	L 64–78 ^{OT}	5–3	Chiles Center (418); Portland, OR
Dec 8, 2019*; 2:00 pm		Grand Canyon	W 73–41	6–3	Chiles Center (452); Portland, OR
Dec 15, 2019*; 2:00 pm, NBCSNW		Portland State	L 71–77	6–4	Chiles Center (633); Portland, OR
Dec 19, 2019*; 5:00 pm		Willamette	W 82–42	7–4	Chiles Center (354); Portland, OR
WCC regular season
Dec 29, 2019; 1:00 pm		at No. 17 Gonzaga	L 57–62	7–5 (0–1)	McCarthey Athletic Center (6,000); Spokane, WA
Jan 2, 2020; 6:00 pm		at San Diego	L 55–74	7–6 (0–2)	Jenny Craig Pavilion (179); San Diego, CA
Jan 4, 2020; 1:00 pm, BYU TV		at BYU	W 57–48	8–6 (1–2)	Marriott Center (858); Provo, UT
Jan 9, 2020; 1:00 pm		Pacific	L 73–77	8–7 (1–3)	Chiles Center (427); Portland, OR
Jan 11, 2020; 2:00 pm, NBCSNW		Saint Mary's	W 78–65	9–7 (2–3)	Chiles Center (535); Portland, OR
Jan 16, 2020; 7:00 pm		at San Francisco	W 73–66	10–7 (3–3)	War Memorial Gymnasium (206); San Francisco, CA
Jan 18, 2020; 2:00 pm		at Santa Clara	W 80–77	11–7 (4–3)	Leavey Center (334); Santa Clara, CA
Jan 23, 2020; 7:00 pm		Loyola Marymount	W 74–49	12–7 (5–3)	Chiles Center (428); Portland, OR
Jan 25, 2020; 2:00 pm, NBCSNW		Pepperdine	W 69–67	13–7 (6–3)	Chiles Center (450); Portland, OR
Jan 30, 2020; 7:00 pm		BYU	L 54–66	13–8 (6–4)	Chiles Center (886); Portland, OR
Feb 1, 2020; 2:00 pm, NBCSNW		San Diego	L 58–62	13–9 (6–5)	Chiles Center (933); Portland, OR
Feb 6, 2020; 6:30 pm		at Saint Mary's	W 72–53	14–9 (7–5)	University Credit Union Pavilion (188); Moraga, CA
Feb 8, 2020; 3:00 pm		at Pacific	L 70–77	14–10 (7–6)	Alex G. Spanos Center (892); Stockton, CA
Feb 13, 2020; 7:00 pm		Santa Clara	W 80–77	15–10 (8–6)	Chiles Center (586); Portland, OR
Feb 15, 2020; 2:00 pm, NBCSNW		San Francisco	W 69–49	16–10 (9–6)	Chiles Center (1,772); Portland, OR
Feb 20, 2020; 7:00 pm		at Pepperdine	W 64–62	17–10 (10–6)	Firestone Fieldhouse (227); Malibu, CA
Feb 22, 2020; 2:00 pm		at Loyola Marymount	W 89–78	18–10 (11–6)	Gersten Pavilion (328); Los Angeles, CA
Feb 29, 2020; 2:00 pm		No. 11 Gonzaga	L 42–56	18–11 (11–7)	Chiles Center (1,709); Portland, OR
WCC Women's Tournament
Mar 7, 2020; 1:00 pm, RTNW/BYUtv	(4)	vs. (5) Pacific; Quarterfinals	W 76–69	19–11	Orleans Arena; Paradise, NV
Mar 9, 2020; 12:00 pm, RTNW/BYUtv	(4)	vs. (1) No. 11 Gonzaga; Semifinals	W 70–69	20–11	Orleans Arena (5,200); Paradise, NV
Mar 10, 2020; 1:00 pm, ESPNU	(4)	vs. (2) San Diego; Championship Game	W 64–63 ^{OT}	21–11	Orleans Arena (1,750); Paradise, NV
NCAA Women's Tournament
*Non-conference game. ^{#}Rankings from AP Poll. (#) Tournament seedings in parentheses. All times are in Pacific Time.

== See also ==
- 2019–20 Portland Pilots men's basketball team
