= Coconut Hoops =

College basketball tournament held in Florida

GEICO Coconut Hoops
Tournament information
- Sport: College basketball
- Location: Fort Myers, Florida
- Month played: November
- Established: 2013
- Administrator: BDG Sports, LLC
- Format: bracketed tournament and showcase
- Host: Florida Gulf Coast Eagles
- Venue: Alico Arena
- Teams: Men's: 8 Women's: 8
- Website: GEICO Coconut Hoops

Current champion
- Men; Royal Palm: Belmont; Tarpon Bay: Florida Gulf Coast, Kennesaw State; Women; Blue Heron: Iowa State; Great Egret: Oklahoma

GEICO Coconut Hoops, formerly known as the Gulf Coast Showcase, is a college basketball tournament and showcase event that started in 2013, and was originally held at Hertz Arena in Estero, Florida through 2024, before moving to Alico Arena in Fort Myers, Florida in 2025. The men's eight-team event is designed to showcase the top mid-major programs from across the country. The women's tournament is held a few days after the men's tournament and showcases a mix of both high and mid-major programs. Until 2016, all games were streamed on ASunTV. FloCollege began streaming the tournament in 2017.

== Brackets ==
* – Denotes overtime period

=== 2025 ===
==== Men's ====
Eight men's teams will participate in the event in 2025. Four will play in a bracketed format labeled the Royal Palm Division; the other four will play three games each in a showcase format labeled the Tarpon Bay Division.

Royal Palm Division

Consolation; November 26
Troy	74
Saint Francis	64

Semifinals; November 24
Troy	68
Toledo	75
Belmont	94
Saint Francis	57

Championship; November 26
Toledo	69
Belmont	87

Tarpon Bay Division

November 24
Kennesaw State	89
Rice	84

November 24
Oral Roberts	88
Florida Gulf Coast	92

November 25
Kennesaw State	83
Oral Roberts	91

November 25
Rice	63 ^{OT}
Florida Gulf Coast	78

November 26
Oral Roberts	62
Rice	81

November 26
Kennesaw State	102
Florida Gulf Coast	100 ^{OT}

==== Women's ====
Eight women's teams will compete in two separate four-team brackets.

Blue Heron Division

Consolation; November 30
Marquette	61
Gonzaga	65

Semifinals; November 28
10	Iowa State	84
Marquette	73
Indiana	76
Gonzaga	72

Championship; November 30
10	Iowa State	106
Indiana	95

Great Egret Division

Consolation; November 30
Missouri State	77
Coppin State	56

Semifinals; November 28
Florida State	85
Missouri State	75
9	Oklahoma	100
Coppin State	46

Championship; November 30
Florida State	91
9	Oklahoma	109

=== 2024 ===
==== Men's ====
The 2024 men's Gulf Coast Showcase was a six-team showcase-format event with predetermined opponents held the Monday through Wednesday before Thanksgiving.

Monday, November 25
Ball State	63
Eastern Kentucky	61

Monday, November 25
Southern Illinois	79
Louisiana Tech	85*

Monday, November 25
Richmond	67
Florida Tech	57

Tuesday, November 26
Eastern Kentucky	77
Southern Illinois	72

Tuesday, November 26
Louisiana Tech	65
Richmond	62

Tuesday, November 26
Florida Tech	57
Ball State	94

Wednesday, November 27
Eastern Kentucky	69
Louisiana Tech	78

Wednesday, November 27
Southern Illinois	81
Florida Tech	54

Wednesday, November 27
Richmond	70
Ball State	63

==== Women's ====
5th Place Game; Sunday, December 1
Illinois State	82
New Mexico State	66
7th Place Game; Sunday, December 1
High Point	65
Santa Clara	74

Consolation 2nd Round; Saturday, November 30
Illinois State	70
High Point	49
Santa Clara	49
New Mexico State	61

First Round; Friday, November 29
Boise State	79
Illinois State	76
12	West Virginia	89
High Point	54
Butler	79
Santa Clara	50
5	Texas	90
New Mexico State	50

Semifinals; Saturday, November 30
Boise State	47
12	West Virginia	82
Butler	59
5	Texas	94

Championship; Sunday, December 1
12	West Virginia	73
5	Texas	78
3rd Place Game; Sunday, December 1
Boise State	64
Butler	70

=== 2023 ===
==== Men's ====
5th place game November 22
Long Beach State	82
Louisiana	92
7th place game
Iona	89
Buffalo	64

Consolation 2nd Round; November 21
Iona	76
Long Beach State	80
Louisiana	68
Buffalo	60

First Round; November 20
Iona	68
High Point	82
Long Beach State	52
Illinois State	61
Louisiana	85
Wright State	91
Hofstra	102
Buffalo	68

Semifinals; November 21
High Point	74
Illinois State	72
Wright State	76
Hofstra	85

Championship; November 22
High Point	92
Hofstra	97^{OT}
3rd place game
Illinois State	49
Wright State	74

==== Women's ====
5th Place Game; November 26
Western Kentucky	77
Purdue Fort Wayne	90
7th Place Game
Vermont	66
Delaware	73

Consolation 2nd Round; November 25
Western Kentucky	62
Vermont	50
Delaware	74
Purdue Fort Wayne	88

First Round; November 24
16	Kansas State	77
Western Kentucky	61
18	North Carolina	54
Vermont	51
Florida Gulf Coast	83
Delaware	63
5	Iowa	98
Purdue Fort Wayne	59

Semifinals; November 25
16	Kansas State	63
18	North Carolina	56
Florida Gulf Coast	62
5	Iowa	100

Championship; November 26
16	Kansas State	70
5	Iowa	77
3rd Place Game
18	North Carolina	64
Florida Gulf Coast	65

=== 2022 ===
==== Men's ====
5th place game November 23
East Carolina	79
UT Arlington	65
7th place game
Toledo	82
Northern Kentucky	62

Consolation 2nd Round; November 22
Toledo	75
East Carolina	86
UT Arlington	60
Northern Kentucky	56

First Round; November 21
Toledo	71
Kansas City	83
East Carolina	75
Indiana State	79
Drexel	59
UT Arlington	38
Northern Kentucky	61
Florida Gulf Coast	82

Semifinals; November 22
Kansas City	63
Indiana State	61
Drexel	59
Florida Gulf Coast	67

Championship; November 23
Kansas City	59
Florida Gulf Coast	73
3rd place game
Indiana State	85
Drexel	81

==== Women's ====
5th Place Game; November 27
Belmont	52
Georgia Tech	58
7th Place Game
Saint Louis	77
Air Force	58

Consolation 2nd Round; November 26
Saint Louis	68
Belmont	78
Air Force	59
Georgia Tech	65

First Round; November 25
21	Baylor	92
Saint Louis	58
Belmont	80
23т	Villanova	83
22	Michigan	68
Air Force	48
Georgia Tech	50
South Florida	63

Semifinals; November 26
21	Baylor	75
23т	Villanova	70
22	Michigan	63
South Florida	58

Championship; November 27
21	Baylor	75
22	Michigan	84
3rd Place Game
23т	Villanova	72
South Florida	50

=== 2021 ===
==== Men's ====
5th place game November 24
Vermont	65
Appalachian State	63
7th place game
Evansville	60
Akron	69

Consolation 2nd Round; November 23
Evansville	49
Vermont	58
Akron	45
Appalachian State	57

First Round; November 22
Rice	109
Evansville	104
Vermont	61
Oakland	63
Akron	43
Fordham	63
Appalachian State	68
Delaware	75

Semifinals; November 23
Rice	73
Oakland	76
Fordham	71
Delaware	81

Championship; November 24
Oakland	81
Delaware	73
3rd place game
Rice	74
Fordham	84

==== Women's ====
5th Place Game; November 28
South Dakota State	71
Charlotte	70
7th Place Game
19	UCLA	73
St. John's	65

Consolation 2nd Round; November 27
South Dakota State	76
19	UCLA	66
Charlotte	82
St. John's	64

First Round; November 26
South Dakota State	63
UMass	81
19	UCLA	69
Kent State	75
13	Iowa State	75
Charlotte	59
Penn State	80
St. John's	75

Semifinals; November 27
UMass	72
Kent State	64
13	Iowa State	93
Penn State	59

Championship; November 28
UMass	71
Iowa State	76
3rd Place Game
Kent State	81
Penn State	74

=== 2020 ===
==== Men's ====
No Tournament due to COVID-19

==== Women's ====
November 27
Arkansas	98
Wake Forest	82

November 27
Davidson	72
Maryland	94

November 27
Missouri State	74
Florida Gulf Coast	49

November 28
Wake Forest	85
Davidson	77

November 28
Florida Gulf Coast	80
Arkansas	86

November 28
Maryland	72
Missouri State	81

November 29
Davidson	61
Florida Gulf Coast	84

November 29
Missouri State	58
Wake Forest	69

November 29
Arkansas	96
Maryland	115

Games were played at Alico Arena on the campus of Florida Gulf Coast University, in Fort Myers, Florida

=== 2019 ===
==== Men's ====
5th place game November 27
Drake	63
Murray State	53
7th place game
Northeastern	79
Weber State	69

Consolation 2nd Round; November 26
Northeastern	56
Drake	59
Weber State	68
Murray State	69

First Round; November 25
Northeastern	62
South Alabama	74
Drake	59
Miami (OH)	67
Wright State	72
Weber State	57
Murray State	64
La Salle	75

Semifinals; November 26
South Alabama	82
Miami (OH)	71
Wright State	70
La Salle	72

Championship; November 27
South Alabama	76
La Salle	81
3rd place game
Miami (OH)	66
Wright State	71

==== Women's ====
5th place game December 1
Auburn	82
Drake	83
7th place game
Dayton	78
Maine	49

Consolation 2nd Round; November 30
Auburn	76*
Dayton	74
Maine	62
Drake	94*

First Round; November 29
Auburn	50
Middle Tennessee	73
22	Gonzaga	76
Dayton	65
Arizona State	57
Maine	31
Drake	47
Purdue	67

Semifinals; November 30
Middle Tennessee	50
22	Gonzaga	62
Arizona State	52
Purdue	59

Championship; December 1
22	Gonzaga	63
Purdue	50
3rd place game
Middle Tennessee	60
Arizona State	61

=== 2018 ===
==== Men's ====
5th place game November 21
South Dakota State	78
Colorado State	65
7th place game
UTSA	76
Florida Gulf Coast	65

Consolation 2nd Round; November 20
South Dakota State	99
UTSA	79
Colorado State	82
Florida Gulf Coast	74

First Round; November 19
South Dakota State	80
Tulane	84
UC Irvine	65
UTSA	56
Louisiana	91
Colorado State	73
Florida Gulf Coast	62
Toledo	90

Semifinals; November 20
Tulane	55
UC Irvine	67
Louisiana	64
Toledo	77

Championship; November 21
UC Irvine	60
Toledo	67
3rd place game
Tulane	61
Louisiana	68

==== Women's ====
5th place game November 25
Duke	64
21	Missouri	72
7th place game
Ball State	66
Quinnipiac	69

Consolation 2nd Round; November 24
Ball State	62
Duke	79
Quinnipiac	51
21	Missouri	65

First Round; November 23
Fordham	78
Ball State	70
Duke	64
Washington	71
10	Texas	56
Quinnipiac	55
21	Missouri	54
Michigan	70

Semifinals
Fordham	65
Washington	57
10	Texas	69
Michigan	52

Championship; November 25
Fordham	54
10	Texas	72
3rd place game
Washington	73
Michigan	80

=== 2017 ===
==== Men's ====
5th place game November 22
Missouri State	71
Florida Atlantic	60
7th place game
Manhattan	68
Northern Illinois	70

Consolation 2nd Round; November 21
Manhattan	65
Missouri State	69
Northern Illinois	67
Florida Atlantic	77

First Round; November 20
UMKC	74
Manhattan	63
Georgia Southern	74
Missouri State	73
Penn	93
Northern Illinois	80
Towson	76
Florida Atlantic	52

Semifinals; November 21
UMKC	75
Georgia Southern	78
Penn	71
Towson	79

Championship; November 22
Georgia Southern	67
Towson	70
3rd place game
UMKC	65
Penn	68

==== Women's ====
5th place game November 26
Rutgers	60
Washington State	63
7th place game
Western Michigan	87
East Tennessee State	79

Consolation 2nd Round; November 25
Western Michigan	64
Rutgers	75
Washington State	80
East Tennessee State	76

First Round; November 24
St. John's	76
Western Michigan	48
3	South Carolina	78
Rutgers	68
17	South Florida	82
Washington State	45
6	Notre Dame	77
East Tennessee State	46

Semifinals
St. John's	58
3	South Carolina	76
17	South Florida	66
6	Notre Dame	76

Championship; November 26
3	South Carolina	85
6	Notre Dame	92
3rd place game
St. John's	59
17	South Florida	68

=== 2016 ===
==== Men's ====
5th place game November 23
Bradley	66
George Mason	77
7th place game
Wofford	59
Kent State	66

Consolation 2nd Round; November 22
Wofford	62
Bradley	70
Kent State	75
George Mason	79

First Round; November 21
Vermont	60
Wofford	59
Hofstra	92
Bradley	90
Kent State	77
South Dakota	80
Houston	93
George Mason	56

Semifinals; November 22
Vermont	87
Hofstra	73
South Dakota	58
Houston	85

Championship; November 23
Vermont	71
Houston	72
3rd place game
Hofstra	65
South Dakota	57

==== Women's ====
5th place game November 27
WKU	68
George Washington	49
7th place game
Kent State	78
Florida Gulf Coast	64

Consolation 2nd Round; November 26
Kent State	77
WKU	79*
Florida Gulf Coast	47
George Washington	76

First Round; November 25
5	Baylor	84
Kent State	42
18	DePaul	77
WKU	69
8	Ohio State	79
Florida Gulf Coast	66
11	Syracuse	64
George Washington	61

Semifinals
5	Baylor	104
18	DePaul	72
8	Ohio State	77
11	Syracuse	72

Championship; November 27
5	Baylor	85
8	Ohio State	68
3rd place game
18	DePaul	108
11	Syracuse	84

=== 2015 ===
==== Men's ====
5th place game November 25
Duquesne	81
WKU	73
7th place game
Milwaukee	84
Central Michigan	78

Consolation 2nd Round; November 24
Milwaukee	92
Duquesne	96*
WKU	88
Central Michigan	60

First Round; November 23
Milwaukee	63
Murray State	66
Duquesne	70
Pepperdine	84
Drake	81
WKU	79
Weber State	63
Central Michigan	60

Semifinals; November 24
Murray State	59
Pepperdine	55
Drake	58
Weber State	74

Championship; November 25
Murray State	59
Weber State	75
3rd place game
Pepperdine	53
Drake	69

==== Women's ====
5th place game November 29
Maine	52
LSU	41
7th place game
Missouri State	77
Marist	45

Consolation 2nd Round; November 28
Maine	69
Missouri State	65
Marist	49
LSU	72

First Round; November 27
Dayton	58
Maine	37
13	Stanford	82
Missouri State	65
16	Louisville	65
Marist	53
LSU	52
Purdue	69

Semifinals
Dayton	66
13	Stanford	74
16	Louisville	60
Purdue	62

Championship; November 29
13	Stanford	71*
Purdue	62
3rd place game
Dayton	79
16	Louisville	66

=== 2014 ===
==== Men's ====
5th place game
East Carolina	73
Hawai'i	75
7th place game
Fresno State	64
Marist	68

Consolation 2nd Round
East Carolina	58
Fresno State	52
Marist	55
Hawai'i	62

First Round
Green Bay	66
East Carolina	49
Fresno State	52
Evansville	58
Florida Gulf Coast	58
Marist	43
San Francisco	88
Hawai'i	73

Semifinals
Green Bay	64
Evansville	62
Florida Gulf Coast	62
San Francisco	47

Championship
Green Bay	59
Florida Gulf Coast	45
3rd place game
Evansville	79
San Francisco	72

==== Women's ====
5th place game
Georgia Tech	69
Minnesota	72
7th place game
Villanova	60
College of Charleston	41

Consolation 2nd Round
Georgia Tech	71
Villanova	63
Minnesota	74
College of Charleston	50

First Round
Georgia Tech	50
Green Bay	71
Arizona State	51
Villanova	46
Vanderbilt	71
Minnesota	54
3	Connecticut	84
College of Charleston	25

Semifinals
Green Bay	63
Arizona State	57
Vanderbilt	52
3	Connecticut	91

Championship
Green Bay	53
3	Connecticut	89
3rd place game
Arizona State	72
Vanderbilt	67

=== 2013 ===
==== Men's ====
5th place game
San Diego	59
Southern Illinois	56
7th place game
UNC Greensboro	75
Stetson	68

Consolation 2nd Round
San Diego	83
UNC Greensboro	71
Stetson	48
Southern Illinois	67

First Round
Louisiana Tech	99
UNC Greensboro	62
San Diego	70
UIC	75
Wagner	81
Stetson	64
St. Bonaventure	83
Southern Illinois	79

Semifinals
Louisiana Tech	103
UIC	78
Wagner	67
St. Bonaventure	70

Championship
Louisiana Tech	76
St. Bonaventure	72
3rd place game
UIC	94
Wagner	76

==== Women's ====
5th place game
NC State	67
UCLA	49
7th place game
Southeastern Louisiana	57
Grand Canyon	62

Consolation 2nd Round
Southeastern Louisiana	59
NC State	87
Grand Canyon	60
UCLA	62

First Round
Middle Tennessee	88
Southeastern Louisiana	71
NC State	90
Wright State	99
Mississippi State	71
Grand Canyon	62
UCLA	67
James Madison	77

Semifinals
Middle Tennessee	69
Wright State	62
Mississippi State	65
James Madison	52

Championship
Middle Tennessee	62
Mississippi State	48
3rd place game
Wright State	79
James Madison	77
