= 2020–21 Florida Gulf Coast Eagles women's basketball team =

Intercollegiate basketball season

2020–21 Florida Gulf Coast Eagles women's basketball
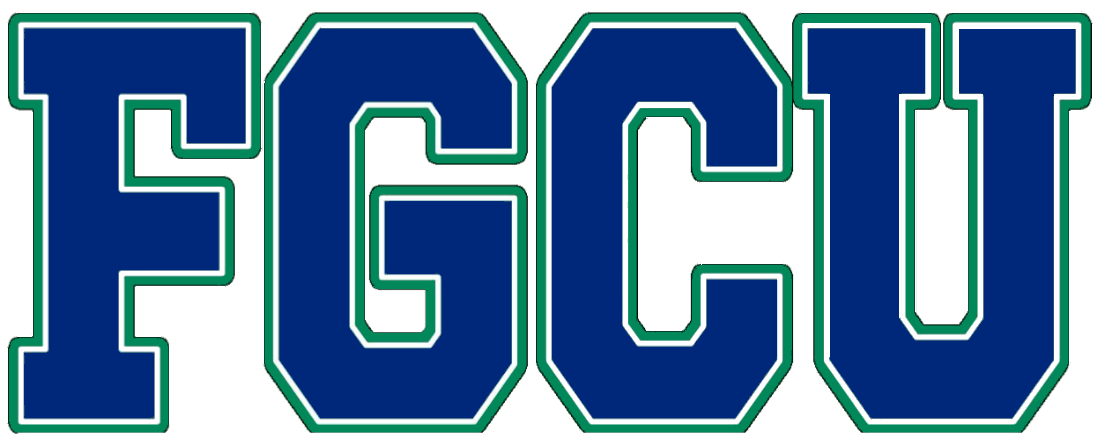

Atlantic Sun regular season and tournament champions

NCAA tournament, first round
- Conference: Atlantic Sun Conference

Ranking
- Coaches: No. 25
- AP: No. 24
- Record: 26–3 (16–0 A-Sun)
- Head coach: Karl Smesko (19th season)
- Associate head coach: Chelsea Lyles
- Assistant coaches: Shannon Murphy; Mandi Pierce
- Home arena: Alico Arena

2020–21 ASUN women's basketball standings
	Conf.				Overall
Team	W		L	PCT	W		L	PCT
No. 24 Florida Gulf Coast†	16	–	0	1.000	23	–	2	.920
Liberty	12	–	4	.750	17	–	7	.708
North Florida	11	–	5	.688	13	–	10	.565
Lipscomb	8	–	6	.571	11	–	9	.550
Stetson	7	–	9	.438	9	–	12	.429
North Alabama*	6	–	9	.400	7	–	17	.292
Bellarmine*	5	–	11	.313	5	–	16	.238
Kennesaw State	2	–	11	.154	7	–	11	.389
Jacksonville	1	–	13	.071	3	–	16	.158
† 2021 ASUN Tournament winner * ineligible for the 2021 NCAA tournament due to transition period As of March 6, 2021; Rankings from AP poll

The 2020–21 Florida Gulf Coast Eagles women's basketball team represented Florida Gulf Coast University during the 2020–21 NCAA Division I women's basketball season. The Eagles, were led by nineteenth year head coach Karl Smesko, they played their home games at the Alico Arena and were members of the Atlantic Sun Conference.

== Previous season ==
The Eagles went 30–3 overall and 15–1 in conference play. They won their first two games of the ASUN tournament against Lipscomb and North Florida before the championship and subsequently the rest of the season due to COVID-19 pandemic.

=== Departures ===
Name	Number	Pos.	Height	Year	Hometown	Notes
Davion Wingate	0	G	5'6"	RS-Senior	Atlanta, GA	Graduated
Erna Normil	1	G/F	5'10"	RS-Junior	Lake Worth, FL	Graduated
Keri Jewett-Giles	3	G	5'6"	RS-Senior	Fort Myers, FL	Graduated
Chandler Ryan	4	G	5'7"	RS-Junior	Groveland, IL	Graduated
Anja Marinkovic	5	G	5'8"	RS-Junior	Sombor, Serbia	Graduated
Kerstie Phills	13	G	5'9"	RS-Junior	Charlotte, NC	Graduated
Ashley Panem	23	G	5'9"	RS-Freshman	Broomfield, CO	Transferred to Western Nebraska Community College
Nasrin Ulel	24	G/F	5'9"	Senior	Murrieta, CA	Graduated
Ashli O'Neal	34	G	5'5"	Graduate Student	Wyoming, OH	Graduated
Tytionia Adderly	42	F	5'10"	Senior	Jupiter, FL	Graduated

=== Additions ===
Name	Number	Pos.	Height	Year	Hometown	Notes
Kierstan Bell	1	G	6'1"	Sophomore	Alliance, OH	Transferred from Ohio State
Andrea Cecil	3	G	6'1"	Graduate Student	Oak Harbor, OH	Transferred from Bowling Green
Tishara Morehouse	4	G	5'3"	Junior	Milwaukee, WI	Transferred from Western Nebraska Community College
Aaliyah Stanley	5	p	5'6"	Sophomore	Boynton Beach, FL	Transferred from Eastern Michigan

=== 2020 recruiting class ===
College recruiting information
Name	Hometown	School	Height	Weight	Commit date
Maddie Antenucci; G/F	Cincinnati, Ohio	Indian Hill High School	5 ft 10 in (1.78 m)	N/A	Oct 8, 2019
Maddie Antenucci; G/F	Recruit ratings: Scout: Rivals: 247Sports: ESPN: (0)				
Seneca Hackley; G	Colorado Springs, CO	St. Mary's High School	5 ft 9 in (1.75 m)	N/A	Nov 14, 2019
Seneca Hackley; G	Recruit ratings: Scout: Rivals: 247Sports: ESPN: (0)				
Tomia Johnson; G	Aurora, CO	Grandview High School	5 ft 6 in (1.68 m)	N/A	Jul 19, 2019
Tomia Johnson; G	Recruit ratings: Scout: Rivals: 247Sports: ESPN: (0)				
Overall recruit ranking:
Note: In many cases, Scout, Rivals, 247Sports, On3, and ESPN may conflict in their listings of height and weight.; In these cases, the average was taken. ESPN grades are on a 100-point scale.; Sources: "2020 Team Ranking". Rivals.

== Roster ==
2020–21 Florida Gulf Coast Eagles women's basketball team
Players
Coaches

Pos.	#	Name	Height	Year	Previous school	Hometown
G	0	Tomia Johnson	5 ft 6 in (1.68 m)	Fr	Grandview High School	Aurora, CO
G	1	Kierstan Bell	6 ft 1 in (1.85 m)	So	Canton McKinley; Ohio State	Alliance, OH
G	2	Alyssa Blair	5 ft 11 in (1.8 m)	Sr	Sun Prairie	Sun Prairie, WI
G	3	Andrea Cecil	6 ft 1 in (1.85 m)	GS	Oak Harbor High School; Bowling Green	Oak Harbor, OH
G	4	Tishara Morehouse	5 ft 3 in (1.6 m)	Jr	Rufus King International High School; Western Nebraska CC	Milwaukee, WI
G	5	Aaliyah Stanley	5 ft 6 in (1.68 m)	So	Oxbridge Academy; Eastern Michigan	Boynton Beach, FL
G	10	Sheahen Dowling	5 ft 7 in (1.7 m)	Sr	Trinity	Chicago, IL
G/F	11	Maddie Antenucci	5 ft 10 in (1.78 m)	Fr	Indian Hill High School	Cincinnati, OH
G	15	Tyra Cox	5 ft 8 in (1.73 m)	RS Jr	Lake Highland Prep; William & Mary	Orlando, FL
G	20	Tanner Bryant	5 ft 11 in (1.8 m)	Jr	Miami Trace	Washington Court House, OH
G	21	Kierra Adams	6 ft 0 in (1.83 m)	RS Fr	Brookwood	Lawrenceville, GA
G	24	Seneca Hackley	5 ft 9 in (1.75 m)	Fr	St. Mary's High School	Colorado Springs, CO
G	32	Emma List	5 ft 10 in (1.78 m)	RS Jr	Discovery Canyon; Albany	Colorado Springs, CO

Head coach

- Karl Smesko (Kent State)

Assistant coach(es)

- Chelsea Lyles (Florida Gulf Coast)
- Shannon Murphy (Florida Gulf Coast)
- Mandi Pierce (St. Bonaventure)

Legend

- (C) Team captain
- (S) Suspended
- (I) Ineligible
- (W) Walk-on
- Injured
- Current redshirt

Roster
Last update: July 6, 2024

== Schedule ==
Date time, TV	Rank^{#}	Opponent^{#}	Result	Record	Site (attendance) city, state
Non-conference regular season
November 25, 2020*; 2:30 p.m., ESPN+		Florida Memorial	W 86–40	1–0	Alico Arena (630); Fort Myers, FL
November 27, 2020*; 5:30 p.m., FloHoops		No. 24 Missouri State; Gulf Coast Showcase	L 49–74	1–1	Alico Arena; Fort Myers, FL
November 28, 2020*; 3:30 p.m., FloHoops		No. 14 Arkansas; Gulf Coast Showcase	L 80–86	1–2	Alico Arena; Fort Myers, FL
November 29, 2020*; 11:30 a.m., FloHoops		Davidson; Gulf Coast Showcase	W 84–61	2–2	Alico Arena; Fort Myers, FL
December 6, 2020*; 2:00 p.m., ESPN+		Temple	W 78–69	3–2	Alico Arena (708); Fort Myers, FL
December 13, 2020*; 2:00 p.m., ESPN+		at UCF	W 70–57	4–2	Addition Financial Arena (969); Orlando, FL
December 17, 2020*; 7:00 p.m., ESPN+		Webber International University	W 91–55	5–2	Alico Arena (649); Fort Myers, FL
December 20, 2020*; 12:00 p.m.		at FIU	W 86–68	6–2	Ocean Bank Convocation Center (57); Miami, FL
December 21, 2020*; 12:00 p.m.		at FIU	W 80–66	7–2	Ocean Bank Convocation Center (48); Miami, FL
ASUN Conference regular season
January 16, 2021*; 2:00 p.m., ESPN+		at Bellarmine	W 81–58	8–2 (1–0)	Freedom Hall (182); Louisville, KY
January 17, 2021*; 2:00 p.m., ESPN+		at Bellarmine	W 81–52	9–2 (2–0)	Freedom Hall (169); Louisville, KY
January 23, 2021*; 2:00 p.m., ESPN+		Lipscomb	W 103–49	10–2 (3–0)	Alico Arena (815); Fort Myers, FL
January 24, 2021*; 2:00 p.m., ESPN+		Lipscomb	W 92–48	11–2 (4–0)	Alico Arena (719); Fort Myers, FL
January 29, 2021*; 5:00 p.m., ESPN+		at Stetson	W 72–55	12–2 (5–0)	Edmunds Center (50); DeLand, FL
January 30, 2021*; 3:00 p.m., ESPN+		at Stetson	W 84–62	13–2 (6–0)	Edmunds Center (50); DeLand, FL
February 6, 2021*; 2:00 p.m., ESPN+		at North Alabama	W 97–70	14–2 (7–0)	Flowers Hall (176); Florence, AL
February 7, 2021*; 3:00 p.m., ESPN+		at North Alabama	W 83–73	15–2 (8–0)	Flowers Hall (161); Florence, FL
February 13, 2021*; 2:00 p.m., ESPN+		Kennesaw State	W 104–60	16–2 (9–0)	Alico Arena (785); Fort Myers, FL
February 14, 2021*; 2:00 p.m., ESPN+		Kennesaw State	W 88–38	17–2 (10–0)	Alico Arena (717); Fort Myers, FL
February 20, 2021*; 1:00 p.m., ESPN+		at Jacksonville	W 89–64	18–2 (11–0)	Swisher Gymnasium (133); Jacksonville, FL
February 21, 2021*; 1:00 p.m., ESPN+		at Jacksonville	W 87–58	19–2 (12–0)	Swisher Gymnasium (180); Jacksonville, FL
February 27, 2021*; 2:00 p.m., ESPN3		North Florida	W 94–45	20–2 (13–0)	Alico Arena (803); Fort Myers, FL
February 28, 2021*; 2:00 p.m., ESPN+		North Florida	W 66–54	21–2 (14–0)	Alico Arena (920); Fort Myers, FL
March 5, 2021*; 7:00 p.m., ESPN+		Liberty	W 80–60	22–2 (15–0)	Alico Arena (1,004); Fort Myers, FL
March 6, 2021*; 5:00 p.m., ESPN3		Liberty	W 65–50	23–2 (16–0)	Alico Arena (921); Fort Myers, FL
Atlantic Sun Tournament
March 11, 2021; 2:00 p.m., ESPN+	(1) No. 24	(9) Jacksonville; Quarterfinals	W 87–62	24–2	KSU Convocation Center (148); Kennesaw, GA
March 12, 2021; 2:00 p.m., ESPN+	(1) No. 24	(4) Lipscomb; Semifinals	W 59–44	25–2	KSU Convocation Center (211); Kennesaw, GA
March 14, 2021; 2:00 p.m., ESPN+	(1) No. 24	(2) Liberty; Championship	W 84–62	26–2	KSU Convocation Center (388); Kennesaw, GA
NCAA tournament
March 21, 2021; 3:00 p.m., ESPN2	(11 RW) No. 24	(6 RW) No. 16 Michigan; First round	L 66–87	26–3	Convocation Center; San Antonio, TX
*Non-conference game. ^{#}Rankings from AP Poll. (#) Tournament seedings in parentheses. RW=River Walk Region. All times are in Eastern.

== Rankings ==
Ranking movements Legend: ██ Increase in ranking ██ Decrease in ranking RV = Received votes
	Week																		
Poll	Pre	1	2	3	4	5	6	7	8	9	10	11	12	13	14	15	16	17	Final
AP														RV	RV	RV	24	24	Not released
Coaches	RV			RV	RV	RV	RV	RV	RV	RV	RV	RV	RV	RV	RV	24	21	21	25

*AP does not release post-NCAA Tournament rankings
*Coaches did not release a Week 2 poll.
