= 2020 West Coast Conference women's basketball tournament =

- Classification: Division I
- Season: 2019–20
- Teams: 10
- Finals site: Orleans Arena; Paradise, Nevada
- Champions: Portland (2nd title)
- Winning coach: Michael Meek (1st title)
- MVP: Alex Fowler (Portland)
- Television: ESPNU/BYUtv

2019–20 West Coast Conference women's basketball standings
	Conf.				Overall
Team	W		L	PCT	W		L	PCT
No. 11 Gonzaga	17	–	1	.944	28	–	3	.903
San Diego	13	–	5	.722	20	–	11	.645
BYU	13	–	5	.722	18	–	11	.621
Portland †	11	–	7	.611	21	–	11	.656
Pacific	9	–	9	.500	17	–	14	.548
Pepperdine	8	–	10	.444	16	–	15	.516
Saint Mary's	6	–	12	.333	12	–	19	.387
San Francisco	5	–	13	.278	12	–	19	.387
Santa Clara	5	–	13	.278	12	–	19	.387
Loyola Marymount	3	–	15	.167	7	–	25	.219
† 2020 WCC tournament winner Rankings from AP poll

The 2020 West Coast Conference women's basketball tournament was played between March 5–10, 2020, at Orleans Arena in Las Vegas, Portland was the winner of the WCC Women's Tournament and would have automatically advanced to the 2020 NCAA Tournament, but that tournament was cancelled due to the COVID-19 pandemic.

== Seeds ==
All 10 WCC schools participated in the tournament. Teams were seeded by conference record, with the following tiebreaker system used to seed teams with identical conference records:

- Head-to-head record.
- Record against the top team in the conference not involved in the tie, going down through the standings as necessary to break the tie. Should more than one team be tied for a position in the standings, collective records against all teams involved in that tie are considered.
- RPI at the end of the conference season.

Seed	School	Conference	Overall*	Tiebreaker
1	Gonzaga	17-1	28-2	
2	San Diego	13-5	19-10	
3	BYU	13-5	18–10	
4	Portland	11-7	18-11	
5	Pacific	9-9	16-13	
6	Pepperdine	8-10	14-14	
7	Saint Mary's	6-12	11-18	
8	Santa Clara	5–13	11-18	
9	San Francisco	5-13	12-18	
10	Loyola Marymount	3-15	7-24	

* Overall record at end of regular season.

== Schedule ==
Session	Game	Time*	Matchup^{#}	Television	Attendance
First round – Thursday March 5, 2020
1	1	12:00 PM	#8 Santa Clara 72** vs. #9 San Francisco 65	BYUtv	
1	2	2:00 PM	#7 Saint Mary's 72 vs. #10 LMU 63	BYUtv	
Second round – Friday March 6, 2020
2	3	12:00 PM	#5 Pacific 67 vs. #8 Santa Clara 49	BYUtv	
2	4	2:00 PM	#6 Pepperdine 87 vs. #7 Saint Mary's 72	BYUtv	
Quarterfinals – Saturday, March 7, 2020
3	5	1:00 PM	#4 Portland 76 vs. #5 Pacific 69	BYUtv	
3	6	3:00 PM	#3 BYU 51 vs. #6 Pepperdine 62	BYUtv	
Semifinals – Monday, March 9, 2020
4	7	12:00 PM	#1 Gonzaga 69 vs. #4 Portland 70	BYUtv	
4	8	2:00 PM	#2 San Diego 59 vs. #6 Pepperdine 44	BYUtv	
Championship – Tuesday, March 10, 2020
5	9	1:00 PM	#4 Portland 64** vs. #2 San Diego 63	ESPNU	
*Game times in PT. #-Rankings denote tournament seeding. **denotes overtime game

== Bracket and scores ==
- All games except the championship aired on BYUtv games and were simulcast on WCC Network and multiple RSN's: NBC Sports Bay Area, Fox Sports Prime Ticket, Fox Sports San Diego, and Root Sports. . The championship aired on ESPNU.

Opening round Thursday, March 5
8	Santa Clara	72*
9	San Francisco	65
7	Saint Mary's	72
10	LMU	63

Second round Friday, March 6
5	Pacific	67
8	Santa Clara	48
6	Pepperdine	87
7	Saint Mary's	72

Third round Saturday, March 7
4	Portland	76
5	Pacific	69
3	BYU	51
6	Pepperdine	62

Semifinals; Monday, March 9
1	Gonzaga	69
4	Portland	70
2	San Diego	59
6	Pepperdine	44

Championship; Tuesday, March 10
4	Portland	64*
2	San Diego	63

* denotes overtime game

== See also ==
- 2019-20 NCAA Division I women's basketball season
- West Coast Conference men's basketball tournament
- 2020 West Coast Conference men's basketball tournament
- West Coast Conference women's basketball tournament
