= Atlantic Sun Conference =

American college sports league

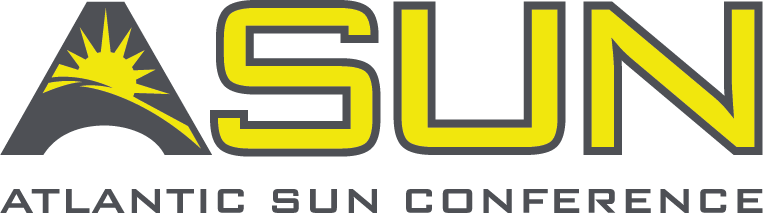
- Formerly: Trans America Athletic Conference (1978–2001); Atlantic Sun Conference (2001–2016); ASUN Conference (2016–2023)
- Association: NCAA
- Founded: 1978
- Commissioner: Jeff Bacon (since 2023)
- Sports fielded: 22; men's: 10; women's: 12
- Division: Division I
- No. of teams: 8
- Headquarters: Jacksonville, Florida
- Region: Southern United States
- Broadcaster: ESPN
- Website: asunsports.org

Locations

The Atlantic Sun Conference (ASUN) is a collegiate athletic conference operating mostly in the Southeastern United States, competing at the NCAA Division I level. Originally established as the Trans America Athletic Conference (TAAC) in 1978, it was renamed as the Atlantic Sun Conference in 2001, and briefly rebranded as the ASUN Conference from 2016 to 2023. The conference still uses "ASUN" as an official abbreviation. The conference headquarters are located in Jacksonville.

== History ==
ASUN Conference Member locations
– Full member
– Departing member
– Affiliate member
– Future member

=== 1970s: Formation ===
The conference was first formed on September 19, 1978, as the Trans America Athletic Conference, at the Dallas–Fort Worth Regional Airport Marina Hotel. Its charter members were Oklahoma City University, Pan American University (later renamed University of Texas-Pan American), Northeast Louisiana University (now known as the University of Louisiana at Monroe), Houston Baptist University (now Houston Christian University), Hardin-Simmons University, Centenary College of Louisiana, Samford University, and Mercer University, all of whom were previously D-I independents. None of the eight charter members remain in the conference today.

=== 1980s and 1990s: Expansion and contraction ===
Almost immediately after its formation, the conference experienced a shake-up in its membership. Oklahoma City departed to become a charter member of the Midwestern City Conference (known today as the Horizon League), while UTPA returned to D-I independent status—both had only played a single season in the infant league. The TAAC was quick to replace the outgoing members with Northwestern State University and the University of Arkansas at Little Rock, along with Georgia Southern University in 1980, but this instability would prove to be a trend through the coming years—over the next 20 years, the conference would accept 16 new members, with many of these leaving after only playing a handful of seasons. 1982 saw the departure of another charter member, Northeast Louisiana, to the Southland Conference. Additionally, it saw the arrival of Nicholls State University, who originally planned to join the TAAC as a full member. However, due to an oversight by the NCAA, adding in a new program who had not competed in Division I for at least five years would result in the offending conference forfeiting their automatic bid to the NCAA Division I men's basketball tournament. To get around this, the TAAC announced that Nicholls State would compete as a provisional member, ineligible for the men's basketball tournament until it completed its D-I transition in 1985. However, it, along with Northwestern State, left the conference in 1984 to join the Gulf Star Conference instead.

The remainder of the 1980s saw mostly growth for the conference, adding Georgia State University in 1983, Stetson University in 1985, and the University of Texas at San Antonio in 1986. However, near the end of the decade, the conference was hit with 5 departures over 4 consecutive years, beginning with Houston Baptist transitioning to the NAIA in 1989.

This was followed by Hardin-Simmons dropping to NCAA Division III in 1990, UTSA and Arkansas–Little Rock leaving for the Southland and Sun Belt conferences in 1991, respectively, and Georgia Southern leaving for the Southern Conference in 1992. In the midst of this, the conference began to relentlessly pursue expansion throughout the 1990s to offset these losses, adding Florida International University in 1990, Southeastern Louisiana University and the College of Charleston in 1991, the University of Central Florida in 1992, Florida Atlantic University in 1993, Campbell University in 1994, Jacksonville State University in 1995, Troy State University in 1997, and Jacksonville University in 1998. Of these 9 schools, though, only 2 ended up staying with the conference for longer than 15 years.

=== 2000s and 2010s: Rebranding ===
The turn of the millennium saw another charter member in Centenary depart in 1999 for the Mid-Continent Conference (now the Summit League); the league was able to offset this with the addition of Belmont University in 2001. Around this same time, the conference sought to rebrand itself, changing its name from the Trans America Athletic Conference to the Atlantic Sun Conference. The newly rebranded A-Sun continued to expand into the 2000s, adding Gardner–Webb University in 2002, Lipscomb University in 2003, East Tennessee State University, Kennesaw State University, and the University of North Florida in 2005, and Florida Gulf Coast University & the University of South Carolina Upstate in 2007. It also lost its fair share of members as well—largely some of the aforementioned members that had been added during the '90s, such as FIU, Florida Atlantic, and Troy to the Sun Belt, Georgia State to the Colonial Athletic Association, and UCF to Conference USA, but it also saw the departure of Samford to the Ohio Valley Conference, leaving Mercer as the only remaining charter member.

The start of the 2010s gave the A-Sun a bit of a reprieve from conference realignment, losing only Campbell and Belmont in 2011 and 2012 to the Big South and OVC, respectively, and only adding recent D-I upgrader Northern Kentucky University in 2012. 2014 saw the departure of its final charter member, Mercer, to the Southern Conference in 2014; however, the Bears continued to compete in the ASUN as an affiliate for beach volleyball and added men's lacrosse to its ASUN membership in 2022. The ASUN continued to expand and contract slowly through the mid-2010s, losing only Northern Kentucky and East Tennessee State (along with Mercer), and only adding the New Jersey Institute of Technology in 2015.

This slow pace didn't stay for long, however. The second half of the decade saw the conference rebranding a second time, to simply the ASUN Conference Two years later, the University of North Alabama arrived from the Division II Gulf South Conference, and Liberty University left the Big South for the ASUN. More recently, Bellarmine University joined from the Division II Great Lakes Valley Conference and NJIT left for the America East Conference in 2020–21. On July 1, 2024, the University of West Georgia joined from the Division II Gulf South Conference.

=== 2020s: Shifting membership and football ===
On January 22, 2020, it was announced that the Coastal Collegiate Sports Association and the ASUN would merge to create a new Division I multisport conference. The timeline below was released with the announcement of this merger and expansion plan:

- June 2023 – ASUN Conference expands to 20 members.
- Before July 1, 2023 – ASUN transfers rights to the ASUN name and marks to the CCSA.
- July 1, 2023 – ASUN 7 joins the CCSA. The CCSA adopts the ASUN name as a multisport conference. The 13 remaining members would adopt the name United Athletic Conference.

The ASUN had planned on expanding to 20 members and then splitting the conference similar to how the Original Big East Conference was split in 2013 into the American Athletic Conference and the New Big East Conference. The new ASUN Conference governed by the CCSA would have made up of the ASUN 7 including all of the members that would have been in the ASUN Conference for at least 8 years to meet the requirements for a new multisport conference. The members would have included Florida Gulf Coast University, Jacksonville University, Kennesaw State University, Lipscomb University, New Jersey Institute of Technology, University of North Florida, and Stetson University. The United Athletic Conference (not to be confused with the United Athletic Conference, the football merger between the Western Athletic Conference and the ASUN in 2023) governed by the original ASUN Conference would have included Bellarmine University, Liberty University, University of North Alabama, and ten other undisclosed schools that would have joined through expansion.

On November 16, 2020, The ASUN Conference announced that, due to the COVID-19 pandemic and the quickly changing landscape in conference realignment, the creation of a new multisport conference would not be possible at the time of the release or with the aforementioned timeline. This comes after the news that NJIT would be leaving the ASUN for the America East Conference in 2021, weakening the ASUN 7 and lowering the chances that a new conference would be created with only six members.

Arguably its biggest move in recent years was the announcement that the conference would be adding the University of Central Arkansas, Eastern Kentucky University, and former member Jacksonville State University, as incoming members on January 29, 2021, with the intent of sponsoring football in the Football Championship Subdivision (FCS) in 2022. With these three schools joining in 2021, the league partnered with another conference beginning to sponsor football, the Western Athletic Conference (WAC), which likewise did not have the minimum of six football-playing members needed for the conference to have an automatic qualifier to the FCS playoffs. The resulting combination of three ASUN and four WAC schools was branded interchangeably as the "ASUN–WAC Challenge" and "WAC–ASUN Challenge," and also referred to as the "AQ7."

The ASUN football league project was thrown into jeopardy as early as November 2021, as Jacksonville State announced it would be leaving once again in 2023 for Conference USA (C-USA), an FBS conference. Liberty was also invited to C-USA for 2023, but had already competed as an FBS independent for some time and was not included in the ASUN's new football league. With the WAC also losing Sam Houston, another football-sponsoring school, to C-USA, the two conferences announced they would be renewing their alliance for the 2022 season. On September 17, 2021, the ASUN announced Austin Peay State University, a football-sponsoring school, as a new member for the 2022–23 season. In May 2022, local media in Charlotte, North Carolina, also reported that Queens University of Charlotte would start a transition from the Division II South Atlantic Conference as a new ASUN member, also effective on July 1 of that year. The ASUN officially announced this move on May 10.

The ASUN also expanded its affiliate membership in the 2020s. The conference started the decade with five affiliate members—Coastal Carolina in both beach volleyball and women's lacrosse, Mercer in beach volleyball only, and Akron, Kent State, and Howard in women's lacrosse. All of the women's lacrosse affiliates left by the 2021–22 school year. Akron and Kent State left after the 2020 season when their full-time home of the Mid-American Conference began sponsoring the sport. Coastal Carolina also left after the 2020 season for the SoCon. Howard moved several sports not sponsored by its full-time home of the Mid-Eastern Athletic Conference to the Northeast Conference, with women's lacrosse moving after the 2021 season. Coastal Carolina moved beach volleyball to C-USA after the 2020–21 school year.

However, the 2021–22 school year saw the arrival of eight new affiliates, as well as the return of former women's lacrosse affiliates Coastal Carolina and Delaware State for that sport. ASUN beach volleyball added Charleston, Stephen F. Austin, and UNC Wilmington. The largest change in affiliatemembership involved the relaunch of ASUN men's lacrosse. Full member Bellarmine was joined by five new affiliates—Air Force, Cleveland State, Detroit Mercy, Robert Morris, and Utah.

The ASUN lost five beach volleyball members for 2022–23. The conference's four affiliates in that sport left for the Sun Belt Conference (SBC), which added that sport. Charleston, Stephen F. Austin, and UNC Wilmington all left the ASUN after a single season and Mercer also moved beach volleyball to the SBC. Also, departing full member Jacksonville State moved beach volleyball to its future home of C-USA a year before its all-sports move to that league.

Also for 2022–23, Mercer moved men's lacrosse into the ASUN after the SoCon shut down its men's lacrosse league, and new D-I member Lindenwood became an affiliate in both men's and women's lacrosse.

On October 14, 2022, Conference USA and Kennesaw State jointly announced that KSU would start a transition to FBS after the 2022 football season and join C-USA in 2024.

ESPN reported on December 9, 2022, that the ASUN and WAC had agreed to form a new football-only conference that plans to start play in 2024. The initial membership would consist of Austin Peay, Central Arkansas, Eastern Kentucky, and North Alabama from the ASUN, and Abilene Christian, Southern Utah, Stephen F. Austin, Tarleton, and Utah Tech from the WAC. The new football conference also reportedly planned to move "from what is currently known as FCS football to what is currently known as FBS football at the earliest practicable date." On December 20, the two conferences confirmed the football merger, announcing that the new football league would start play in 2023 under the tentative name of ASUN–WAC Football Conference. This was followed in April 2023 by the new league rebranding itself as the United Athletic Conference (UAC). The UAC played a six-game schedule in 2023 and planned to start full round-robin conference play in 2024. Neither conference's official announcement mentioned any plans to move to FBS.

On September 1, 2023, it was announced that the ASUN would undergo another rebranding to reinstate the use of the name Atlantic Sun. The conference still uses "ASUN" as its official abbreviation.

The ASUN added men's and women's swimming & diving for the 2023–24 season, taking most of its initial membership from the Coastal Collegiate Sports Association, which had been founded as a partnership of several all-sports conferences, including the ASUN, as a home for that sport (the CCSA's scope would later expand to include beach volleyball). Two affiliate members came from the American Athletic Conference, which dropped men's swimming as a sponsored sport after the 2022–23 season. The initial membership for that sport was:

- Two full members, Bellarmine and Queens, compete in both the men's and women's leagues.
- Two other full members, Florida Gulf Coast and North Florida, sponsor only the women's sport.
- The two full men's members were joined by affiliate members Florida Atlantic, Gardner–Webb, Old Dominion, and SMU. SMU only competed in the 2023–24 season, after which it joined the Atlantic Coast Conference, which sponsors the sport for both sexes.
- Gardner–Webb is also an affiliate in women's swimming & diving; it was joined in that status by former full ASUN member Liberty and UNC Asheville.

Following significant membership realignment during the 2024–25 academic year, the Western Athletic Conference and the Atlantic Sun Conference issued a joint announcement on June 26, 2025, outlining a new organizational structure that took effect on July 1, 2026. Under the agreement, the WAC adopted the name United Athletic Conference and now operates as an all-sports NCAA Division I conference. Both conferences now operate under a single administrative structure, with the overall alliance branded as Unisun Sports.

The rebranded conference includes the WAC's remaining full members—Abilene Christian, Tarleton State, and UT Arlington—along with a group of football-sponsoring institutions from the ASUN. The ASUN continues to operate separately as a non-football conference under its existing identity, while the renamed WAC serves as the multi-sport home for the participating football programs.

The restructuring was described by conference officials as a strategic alignment intended to preserve competitive continuity and administrative stability across both leagues. Governance and championship administration for the renamed conference will continue under the WAC's existing NCAA Division I framework, while the ASUN will maintain its separate governance structure.

== Member schools ==
=== Current full members ===
Institution	Location	Founded	Type	Enrollment	Endowment	Nickname	Joined (Note: Represents the calendar year when fall sports competition begins.)	Colors
Bellarmine University	Louisville, Kentucky	1950	Catholic (Archdiocese of Louisville)	3,369	$80.1	Knights	2020	
Florida Gulf Coast University	Fort Myers, Florida (Note: The FGCU campus has a Fort Myers mailing address, but lies in unincorporated Lee County.)	1997	Public	15,076	$129.3	Eagles	2007	
Jacksonville University	Jacksonville, Florida	1934	Nonsectarian	4,213	$59.2	Dolphins	1998	
Lipscomb University	Nashville, Tennessee	1891	Churches of Christ	4,620	$97.5	Bisons	2003	
University of North Florida	Jacksonville, Florida	1965	Public	16,309	$141.0	Ospreys	2005	
Queens University of Charlotte	Charlotte, North Carolina	1857	Presbyterian (PCUSA)	2,463	$185.0	Royals	2022	
Stetson University	DeLand, Florida	1883	Southern; Baptist	4,330	$387.0	Hatters	1985	
University of West Florida	Pensacola, Florida	1963	Public	15,601	$117.7	Argonauts	2026	

=== Affiliate members ===
Institution	Location	Founded	Type	Enrollment	Nickname	Joined (Note: Represents the calendar year when fall sports competition begins.)	ASUN sport(s)	Primary conference
Abilene Christian University	Abilene, Texas	1906	Churches of Christ	6,730	Wildcats	2025	Men's tennis	United (UAC)
United States Air Force Academy (Air Force)	USAF Academy, Colorado (Note: Virtually all of the Air Force Academy grounds, including the cadet area and all athletic facilities, lie outside the city limits of Colorado Springs. The US Census Bureau and US Postal Service consider the Academy to be its own entity, respectively, as "Air Force Academy" and "USAF Academy".)	1954	Military	4,304	Falcons	2021	Men's lacrosse	Mountain West (MW)
University of Arkansas at Little Rock (Note: The school changed its athletic brand to "Little Rock" since the 2015–16 school year.) (Little Rock (Note: Formerly branded athletically as Arkansas–Little Rock (or UALR).))	Little Rock, Arkansas	1927	Public	13,167	Trojans	2026	Women's swimming & diving	United (UAC)
Austin Peay State University (Austin Peay)	Clarksville, Tennessee	1927	Public	9,609	Governors	2026 (Note: Measured from departure from full ASUN membership.)	Beach volleyball	United (UAC)
Austin Peay State University (Austin Peay)	Clarksville, Tennessee	1927	Public	9,609	Governors	2026	Men's tennis	United (UAC)
Austin Peay State University (Austin Peay)	Clarksville, Tennessee	1927	Public	9,609	Governors	2026	Women's lacrosse	United (UAC)
University of Central Arkansas	Conway, Arkansas	1907	Public	10,123	Bears	2026	Beach volleyball	United (UAC)
University of Central Arkansas	Conway, Arkansas	1907	Public	10,123	Bears	2026	Men's soccer	United (UAC)
Coastal Carolina University	Conway, South Carolina	1954	Public	10,484	Chanticleers	2021 (Note: Coastal Carolina had previously competed as a member of the Atlantic Sun for women's lacrosse from the 2017 to 2020 spring seasons (2016–17 to 2019–20 school years).)	Women's lacrosse	Sun Belt (SBC)
University of Delaware	Newark, Delaware	1743	Public (Note: Delaware is officially chartered as a "privately-governed, state-assisted" institution. This status is broadly similar to that of New York State's statutory colleges, most of which are housed at Cornell University, or institutions in Pennsylvania's Commonwealth System of Higher Education.)	23,774	Blue Hens	2025	Women's lacrosse	Conf. USA (CUSA)
University of Delaware	Newark, Delaware	1743	Public	23,774	Blue Hens	2025	Men's swimming & diving	Conf. USA (CUSA)
University of Delaware	Newark, Delaware	1743	Public	23,774	Blue Hens	2025	Women's swimming & diving	Conf. USA (CUSA)
Eastern Kentucky University	Richmond, Kentucky	1874	Public	13,984	Colonels	2026	Beach volleyball	United (UAC)
Eastern Kentucky University	Richmond, Kentucky	1874	Public	13,984	Colonels	2026	Men's tennis	United (UAC)
Florida Atlantic University	Boca Raton, Florida	1961	Public	30,171	Owls	2023	Men's swimming & diving	American
Gardner–Webb University	Boiling Springs, North Carolina	1905	Baptist	3,594	Runnin'; Bulldogs	2023	Men's swimming & diving	Big South (BSC)
Gardner–Webb University	Boiling Springs, North Carolina	1905	Baptist	3,594	Runnin'; Bulldogs	2023	Women's swimming & diving	Big South (BSC)
Georgia Southern University	Statesboro, Georgia	1906	Public	26,106	Eagles	2025	Women's swimming & diving	Sun Belt (SBC)
Kennesaw State University	Kennesaw, Georgia (Note: The KSU campus has a Kennesaw mailing address, but is located in unincorporated Cobb County.)	1963	Public	45,152	Owls	2024	Women's lacrosse	Conf. (CUSA)
Liberty University	Lynchburg, Virginia	1971	Southern; Baptist	16,000 (Note: Approximate on-campus enrollment. Liberty claims an enrollment of over 130,000 including online students.)	Lady Flames	2023	Women's lacrosse	Conf. (CUSA)
Lindenwood University	St. Charles, Missouri	1827	Nonsectarian	7,374	Lions	2022	Women's lacrosse	Ohio Valley (OVC)
Mercer University	Macon, Georgia	1833	C.B.F. (Note: Formerly affiliated with the Georgia Baptist Convention (now the Georgia Baptist Mission Board) until 2006.)	8,740	Bears	2022	Men's lacrosse	Southern (SoCon)
University of North Alabama	Florence, Alabama	1830	Public	11,056	Lions	2026	Beach volleyball	United (UAC)
University of North Alabama	Florence, Alabama	1830	Public	11,056	Lions	2026	Men's tennis	United (UAC)
Old Dominion University	Norfolk, Virginia	1930	Public	24,286	Monarchs	2023	Men's swimming & diving	Sun Belt (SBC)
Old Dominion University	Norfolk, Virginia	1930	Public	24,286	Monarchs	2025	Women's swimming & diving	Sun Belt (SBC)
Tarleton State University	Stephenville, Texas	1899	Public	11,350	Texans	2026	Beach volleyball	United (UAC)
University of North Carolina at Asheville (UNC Asheville)	Asheville, North Carolina	1927	Public	3,762	Bulldogs	2023	Women's swimming & diving	Big South (BSC)
University of Texas at Arlington (UT Arlington)	Arlington, Texas	1895	Public	42,863	Mavericks	2025	Men's tennis	United (UAC)
University of Utah	Salt Lake City, Utah	1850	Public	32,818	Utes	2021	Men's lacrosse	Big 12

=== Former full members ===
School names and nicknames listed here reflect those used during the schools' time in the TAAC/ASUN. One school has changed both its name and nickname and three others have changed only their nicknames.

Seven former full members are now affiliates.

- Little Rock, which left the then-TAAC in 1991, rejoined for women's swimming & diving in 2026.
- Georgia Southern, which left the then-TAAC in 1992, rejoined for women's swimming & diving in 2025.
- Florida Atlantic, which left the ASUN in 2006, rejoined for women's swimming & diving in 2023.
- Gardner–Webb, which left in 2008, rejoined for men's and women's swimming & diving in 2023.
- Mercer, which left in 2014, has been a men's lacrosse affiliate since 2022. It was also an affiliate in women's lacrosse from 2014 to 2017 and beach volleyball from 2014 to 2022.
- Liberty, which left in 2023, remains an affiliate in women's lacrosse, and became an affiliate in women's swimming & diving when the ASUN added that sport in 2023–24. It moved the latter sport to the American Conference in 2025–26.
- Kennesaw State, which left in 2024, remains an affiliate in women's lacrosse.

Institution	Location	Founded	Type	Nickname	Joined (Note: Represents the calendar year when fall sports competition begins.)	Left (Note: Represents the calendar year when spring sports competition ends.)	Current conference
University of Arkansas at Little Rock (Note: The school changed its athletic brand to "Little Rock" in the 2015–16 school year.) (Little Rock (Note: Formerly branded athletically as Arkansas–Little Rock (or UALR).))	Little Rock, Arkansas	1927	Public	Trojans	1979	1991	United (UAC)
Austin Peay State University (Note: Austin Peay previously competed in the Atlantic Sun as an affiliate member for beach volleyball during the 2019 spring season (2018–19 school year).) (Austin Peay)	Clarksville, Tennessee	1927	Public	Governors	2022	2026	United (UAC)
Belmont University	Nashville, Tennessee	1890	Nondenominational	Bruins	2001	2012	Missouri Valley (MVC)
Campbell University	Buies Creek, North Carolina	1887	Baptist	Fighting; Camels	1994	2011	Coastal (CAA)
Centenary College of Louisiana	Shreveport, Louisiana	1825	United; Methodist	Gentlemen & Ladies	1978	1999	Southern (SCAC) (Note: Currently an NCAA Division III athletic conference.)
University of Central Arkansas	Conway, Arkansas	1907	Public	Bears & Sugar Bears	2021	2026	United (UAC)
University of Central Florida (Note: UCF previously competed in the then-TAAC as an affiliate member for women's tennis from the 1986 to 1990 spring seasons (1985–86 to 1989–90 school years).) (UCF)	Orlando, Florida (Note: UCF's main campus has an Orlando mailing address but is physically located in unincorporated Orange County.)	1963	Public	Golden; Knights (Note: UCF dropped the word "Golden" from its nickname in the 2007–08 school year, becoming simply the Knights.)	1992	2005	Big 12
College of Charleston (CofC, Charleston)	Charleston, South Carolina	1770	Public	Cougars	1991	1998	Coastal (CAA)
Eastern Kentucky University	Richmond, Kentucky	1874	Public	Colonels	2021	2026	United (UAC)
East Tennessee State University (ETSU)	Johnson City, Tennessee	1911	Public	Buccaneers	2005	2014	Southern (SoCon)
Florida Atlantic University (FAU)	Boca Raton, Florida	1961	Public	Owls	1993	2006	American
Florida International University (Note: FIU previously competed in the then-TAAC as an affiliate member for women's tennis from the 1988 to 1990 spring seasons (1987–88 to 1989–90 school years).) (FIU)	Miami, Florida (Note: FIU's main campus has a Miami mailing address but is physically located in unincorporated Miami-Dade County.)	1965	Public	Golden; Panthers (Note: FIU dropped the word "Golden" from its nickname in the 2010–11 school year, becoming simply the Panthers.)	1990	1998	Conf. USA (CUSA)
Gardner–Webb University	Boiling Springs, North Carolina	1905	Baptist	Runnin'; Bulldogs	2002	2008	Big South (BSC)
Georgia Southern University	Statesboro, Georgia	1906	Public	Eagles	1979	1992	Sun Belt (SBC)
Georgia State University	Atlanta, Georgia	1913	Public	Panthers	1983	2005	Sun Belt (SBC)
Hardin–Simmons University	Abilene, Texas	1891	Baptist	Cowboys	1978	1990	American Southwest (AmSW)
Houston Baptist University (Note: Known as Houston Christian University since September 2022.)	Houston, Texas	1960	Baptist	Huskies	1978	1989	Southland (SLC)
Jacksonville State University (Note: Jacksonville State previously competed in the Atlantic Sun as an affiliate member for beach volleyball during the 2019 spring season (2018–19 school year).) (Jax State)	Jacksonville, Alabama	1883	Public	Gamecocks	1995	2003	Conf. USA (CUSA)
Jacksonville State University (Jax State)	Jacksonville, Alabama	1883	Public	Gamecocks	2021	2023	Conf. USA (CUSA)
Kennesaw State University	Kennesaw, Georgia (Note: The KSU campus has a Kennesaw mailing address, but is located in unincorporated Cobb County.)	1963	Public	Owls	2005	2024	Conf. USA (CUSA)
Liberty University	Lynchburg, Virginia	1971	Southern; Baptist	Flames & Lady Flames	2018	2023	Conf. USA (CUSA)
Northeast Louisiana University (Note: Currently known as the University of Louisiana at Monroe (ULM) since 1999. The school adopted its current nickname of Warhawks in 2006, when it joined the Sun Belt Conference.)	Monroe, Louisiana	1931	Public	Indians	1978	1982	Sun Belt (SBC)
Mercer University	Macon, Georgia	1833	C.B.F. (Note: Formerly affiliated with the Georgia Baptist Convention (now the Georgia Baptist Mission Board) until 2006.)	Bears	1978	2014	Southern (SoCon)
New Jersey Institute of Technology (NJIT)	Newark, New Jersey	1881	Public	Highlanders	2015	2020	America East (AmEast)
Nicholls State University (Note: Nicholls State was a provisional member, and as such was never a full member of the then-known TAAC. The school changed its athletic brand to "Nicholls" starting in the 2017–18 school year.)	Thibodaux, Louisiana	1948	Public	Colonels	1982	1984	Southland (SLC)
University of North Alabama	Florence, Alabama	1830	Public	Lions	2018	2026	United (UAC)
Northern Kentucky University	Highland Heights, Kentucky	1968	Public	Norse	2012	2015	Horizon
Northwestern State University	Natchitoches, Louisiana	1884	Public	Demons	1979	1984	Southland (SLC)
Oklahoma City University	Oklahoma City, Oklahoma	1904	United; Methodist	Chiefs (Note: Oklahoma City adopted its current nickname of Stars starting in the 1999–2000 school year.)	1978	1979	Sooner (SAC) (Note: Currently an NAIA athletic conference)
Samford University	Homewood, Alabama	1841	Christian	Bulldogs	1978	2003	Southern (SoCon)
University of South Carolina–Upstate (USC Upstate)	Spartanburg, South Carolina	1967	Public	Spartans	2007	2018	Big South (BSC)
Southeastern Louisiana University	Hammond, Louisiana	1925	Public	Lions	1991	1997	Southland (SLC)
Pan American University (Note: Later became as the University of Texas–Pan American (UTPA) in 1989. In 2015, it merged with the University of Texas at Brownsville to form the new University of Texas Rio Grande Valley (UTRGV).)	Edinburg, Texas	1927	Public	Broncs (Note: UTRGV inherited UTPA's athletic program, with the nickname being changed from Broncs to Vaqueros. UTRGV also inherited UTPA's membership in the Western Athletic Conference.)	1978	1980	Southland (SLC)
University of Texas at San Antonio	San Antonio, Texas	1969	Public	Roadrunners	1986	1991	American
Troy University	Troy, Alabama	1887	Public	Trojans	1997	2005	Sun Belt (SBC) (Note: Troy became a member of the Sun Belt for football during the 2004 fall season (2004–05 school year), a year before it joined as an all-sports member.)
University of West Georgia	Carrollton, Georgia	1906	Public	Wolves	2024	2026	United (UAC)

=== Former affiliate members ===
Institution	Location	Founded	Type	Nickname	Joined (Note: Represents the calendar year when fall sports competition begins.)	Left (Note: Represents the calendar year when spring sports competition ends.)	ASUN sport(s)	Primary conference	Current conference in former ASUN sport(s)
University of Akron	Akron, Ohio	1870	Public	Zips	2019	2020 (Note: Akron and Kent State left ASUN women's lacrosse after the 2020 spring season (2019–20 school year) to join the newly formed women's lacrosse league of their full-time home of the Mid-American Conference.)	Women's lacrosse	Mid-American (MAC)	
Central Michigan University	Mount Pleasant, Michigan	1892	Public	Chippewas	2015	2017	Women's lacrosse	Mid-American (MAC)	
College of Charleston (CofC, Charleston)	Charleston, South Carolina	1770	Public	Cougars	2021	2022	Beach volleyball	Coastal (CAA)	Sun Belt (SBC)
Cleveland State University	Cleveland, Ohio	1964	Public	Vikings	2021	2024	Men's lacrosse	Horizon	Northeast (NEC)
Coastal Carolina University	Conway, South Carolina	1954	Public	Chanticleers	2015	2021	Beach volleyball	Sun Belt (SBC)	
Delaware State University	Dover, Delaware	1891	Public (Note: Also a historically black college and university.) (Note: Delaware State is officially chartered as a "privately governed, state-assisted" institution. This status is broadly similar to that of New York State's statutory colleges, most of which are housed at Cornell University, or institutions in Pennsylvania's Commonwealth System of Higher Education.)	Hornets	2016 (Note: Delaware State had previously competed as an affiliate member of the Atlantic Sun for women's lacrosse during the 2017 spring season (2016–17 school year).)	2017	Women's lacrosse	Mid-Eastern (MEAC)	Northeast (NEC)
Delaware State University	Dover, Delaware	1891	Public	Hornets	2021	2024	Women's lacrosse	Mid-Eastern (MEAC)	Northeast (NEC)
University of Detroit Mercy	Detroit, Michigan	1877	Catholic (Jesuit & RSM)	Titans	2012	2017	Women's lacrosse	Horizon	Mid-American (MAC)
University of Detroit Mercy	Detroit, Michigan	1877	Catholic (Jesuit & RSM)	Titans	2021	2024	Men's lacrosse	Horizon	Northeast (NEC)
Elon University	Elon, North Carolina	1889	Nonsectarian (Note: Has historic ties with the United Church of Christ.)	Phoenix	2013	2014	Women's lacrosse	Coastal (CAA)	
Florida A&M University	Tallahassee, Florida	1887	Public	Rattlers & Lady Rattlers	1985	1989	Women's tennis	Southwestern (SWAC)	
Florida A&M University	Tallahassee, Florida	1887	Public	Rattlers & Lady Rattlers	1991	1992	Women's tennis	Southwestern (SWAC)	
Furman University	Greenville, South Carolina	1826	Nonsectarian (Note: Previously affiliated with the South Carolina Baptist Convention until 1992.)	Paladins	2014	2017	Women's lacrosse	Southern (SoCon)	
Howard University	Washington, D.C.	1867	Nonsectarian	Lady Bison	2012	2020	Women's lacrosse	Mid-Eastern (MEAC)	Northeast (NEC)
Kent State University	Kent, Ohio	1910	Public	Golden; Flashes	2018	2020	Women's lacrosse	Mid-American (MAC)	
Liberty University (Note: Liberty competed as a full member of the Atlantic Sun from 2018–19 to 2022–23.)	Lynchburg, Virginia	1971	Private	Lady Flames	2023 (Note: Measured from Liberty's departure from full ASUN membership.)	2025	Women's swimming & diving	Conf. USA (CUSA)	American
Lindenwood University	St. Charles, Missouri	1827	Nonsectarian	Lions	2022	2024	Men's lacrosse	Ohio Valley (OVC)	—N/a (Note: Lindenwood stopped sponsoring men's lacrosse after the 2024 spring season (2023–24 school year).)
Mercer University (Note: Mercer would later become an affiliate member of the Atlantic Sun for men's lacrosse since the 2023 spring season (2022–23 school year).) (Note: Mercer competed as a full member of the Atlantic Sun 1978–79 to 2013–14.)	Macon, Georgia	1833	C.B.F. (Note: Formerly affiliated with the Georgia Baptist Convention (now the Georgia Baptist Mission Board) until 2006.)	Bears	2014 (Note: Measured from Mercer's departure from full ASUN membership.)	2017	Women's lacrosse	Southern (SoCon)	
Mercer University	Macon, Georgia	1833	C.B.F.	Bears	2014	2022	Beach volleyball	Southern (SoCon)	Sun Belt (SBC)
Morehead State University	Morehead, Kentucky	1887	Public	Eagles	2018	2019	Beach volleyball	Ohio Valley (OVC)	
Old Dominion University	Norfolk, Virginia	1930	Public	Monarchs	2014	2018	Women's lacrosse	Sun Belt (SBC)	American
Robert Morris University	Moon Township, Pennsylvania	1921	Nonsectarian	Colonials	2021	2024	Men's lacrosse	Horizon	Northeast (NEC)
Rollins College	Winter Park, Florida	1885	Nonsectarian	Tars	1990	1993	Women's tennis	Sunshine State (SSC) (Note: Currently an NCAA Division II athletic conference.)	
Southern Methodist University (SMU)	Dallas, Texas (Note: Virtually all of the SMU campus lies in University Park, a separate city contained within the Dallas city limits. The US Postal Service considers all locations in University Park to have a Dallas address.)	1911	United; Methodist	Mustangs	2023	2024	Men's swimming & diving	Atlantic Coast (ACC)	
Stephen F. Austin State University	Nacogdoches, Texas	1923	Public	Ladyjacks	2021	2022	Beach volleyball	Southland	
University of North Carolina Wilmington (UNC Wilmington, UNCW)	Wilmington, North Carolina	1947	Public	Seahawks	2021	2022	Beach volleyball	Coastal (CAA)	Sun Belt (SBC)

=== Membership timeline ===
Full member (all sports) Full member (non-football) Associate member (football) Associate member (sport) Other Conference Other Conference

- Northeast Louisiana became the University of Louisiana at Monroe (Louisiana–Monroe) in 1999.
- Pan American, later known as Texas–Pan American or UTPA, merged with the University of Texas at Brownsville in 2015 to create the new University of Texas Rio Grande Valley (UTRGV). The new school inherited UTPA's athletic program.

== Sports sponsored ==
As of the 2023–24 school year, the ASUN sponsors championship competition in 10 men's and 12 women's NCAA sanctioned sports.

In 2008, the ASUN, in an agreement with the Southern Conference (SoCon), Mid-Eastern Athletic Conference (MEAC), and Big South Conference, formed the Coastal Collegiate Swimming Association (CCSA) for schools sponsoring men's and women's swimming and diving within the associated conferences. For the past several years, the ASUN's Commissioner has served as the president of what was initially a swimming & diving-only conference. In 2014 the CCSA expanded to include several other schools from other conferences, and the following year the conference added beach volleyball (women-only at the NCAA level) as a sponsored sport, changing its name to the Coastal Collegiate Sports Association. Currently the conference has 17 member schools, with five men's swimming and diving teams, nine women's swimming & diving teams, and six beach volleyball teams.

A more recent change to the roster of ASUN sports took place after the 2013–14 school year. Under a cooperative agreement between the ASUN and SoCon, the two leagues agreed to split lacrosse sponsorship. The SoCon took over the ASUN men's lacrosse league, while women's lacrosse sponsorship remained with the ASUN. The full alliance in women's lacrosse amicably ended after the 2017 season, with the SoCon sponsoring that sport from the 2018 season forward, but the two leagues continued in a cross-scheduling agreement until the SoCon dropped women's lacrosse after the 2021 season.

Still more recently, on September 13, 2016, the ASUN and Big South announced a football partnership that allows any ASUN members with scholarship football programs to become Big South football members, provided they are located within the general geographic footprint of the two conferences. At the time of announcement, the only ASUN member with a scholarship football program, Kennesaw State, was already a Big South football member. Should any ASUN member add scholarship football, or any non-scholarship football program of an ASUN school (at the time of announcement, Jacksonville and Stetson) upgrade to scholarship football, that team will automatically join Big South football. North Alabama joined Big South football under the terms of this agreement; although the school's home state of Alabama had no schools in either conference at the time it was announced as a future ASUN member, three of its neighboring states were home to six of the ASUN's eight members at that time.

When the ASUN announced the July 2021 entry of Central Arkansas, Eastern Kentucky, and Jacksonville State, it also stated that it would launch a scholarship FCS football league, but did not specify when football competition will begin. No current member is required to add football or change its current football standing. At a press conference on February 23, 2021, the ASUN announced that it had entered into a separate football partnership with the Western Athletic Conference (WAC), which had previously announced the relaunch of its football league at the FCS level in fall 2021 with the arrival of four new FCS member schools. The three incoming ASUN members joined the four incoming WAC members in a round-robin schedule branded as the "ASUN–WAC Challenge". Both conferences proposed an amendment to NCAA bylaws that would allow the alliance to receive an automatic bid to the FCS playoffs. The alliance had seven members, one more than the six normally required for an automatic bid, but were not in the same league for an adequate period to meet the current NCAA "continuity" requirement. The two leagues' proposal was successful, resulting in an automatic qualifier from the seven-team Challenge, colloquially dubbed "AQ7". With the 2022 arrival of Austin Peay providing the ASUN its sixth scholarship FCS program, the ASUN will start its football league in the 2022 season. However, because the ASUN and WAC were each left with only five playoff-eligible football members for 2022 after Jacksonville State (ASUN) and Sam Houston (WAC) started FBS transitions in that season, both leagues renewed their football partnership for 2022. As noted earlier, the two conferences fully merged their football leagues in 2023 as the United Athletic Conference.

Shortly after the addition of football was announced, the ASUN announced that it would reinstate men's lacrosse in the 2022 season, with the lacrosse partnership with the SoCon retained for the time being. The two full ASUN members with men's lacrosse programs, Bellarmine and Jacksonville, separated for that sport, with Bellarmine joining the new ASUN lacrosse league and Jacksonville remaining in SoCon men's lacrosse. Air Force moved from SoCon men's lacrosse; men's lacrosse independent Utah joined; and all three Horizon League members with men's lacrosse programs also joined, with Detroit Mercy moving from the Metro Atlantic Athletic Conference and Cleveland State and Robert Morris moving from independent status. The SoCon maintained its automatic NCAA tournament berth by adding another lacrosse independent, Hampton. The ASUN men's lacrosse league was initially to be administered through the CCSA while operating under the ASUN name as part of the ASUN's intended plan to split into two conferences. This arrangement was scrapped along with the planned conference split once NJIT left for the America East; the men's lacrosse league is now directly administered by the ASUN.

The ASUN added two new beach volleyball members, Charleston and UNCW, in July 2021. At the same time, Coastal Carolina left ASUN beach volleyball for the newly formed Conference USA beach volleyball league. With the demise of SoCon women's lacrosse after the 2021 season, Coastal Carolina and Delaware State returned to the ASUN in that sport after respectively spending one and four seasons in the SoCon.

The SoCon dropped men's lacrosse after the 2022 season due to further conference realignment. Jacksonville returned men's lacrosse to the ASUN, and full SoCon member Mercer became an ASUN men's lacrosse affiliate. Lindenwood, which started a transition from D-II to D-I in 2022 as a new member of the Ohio Valley Conference, became an affiliate in both men's and women's lacrosse (neither of which is sponsored by the OVC). Also in 2022–23, the ASUN lost all four of its beach volleyball affiliates (Charleston, Mercer, Stephen F. Austin, UNCW) to the new beach volleyball league of the Sun Belt Conference.

As noted previously, the ASUN added men's and women's swimming & diving in 2023–24.

ASUN Conference teams
Sport	Men's	Women's
Baseball	8	–
Basketball	8	8
Beach volleyball	–	9
Cross country	8	8
Golf	8	8
Lacrosse	6	9
Soccer	9	8
Softball	–	8
Swimming & diving	6	11
Tennis	12	7
Track and field (indoor)	4	5
Track and field (outdoor)	5	6
Volleyball	–	8

=== Men's sports ===
Men's sponsored sports by school
School	Baseball	Basketball	Cross country	Golf	Lacrosse	Soccer	Swimming & diving	Tennis	Track & field (indoor)	Track & field (outdoor)	Total sports
Bellarmine	Yes	Yes	Yes	Yes	Yes	Yes	Yes	Yes	Yes	Yes	10
Florida Gulf Coast	Yes	Yes	Yes	Yes	No	Yes	No	Yes	No	No	6
Jacksonville	Yes	Yes	Yes	Yes	Yes	Yes	No	No	No	No	6
Lipscomb	Yes	Yes	Yes	Yes	No	Yes	No	Yes	Yes	Yes	8
North Florida	Yes	Yes	Yes	Yes	No	Yes	No	Yes	Yes	Yes	8
Queens	Yes	Yes	Yes	Yes	Yes	Yes	Yes	Yes	Yes	Yes	10
Stetson	Yes	Yes	Yes	Yes	No	Yes	No	Yes	No	Yes (Note: Stetson added men's outdoor track & field in 2026–27, but will initially compete only in distance events.)	6
West Florida	Yes	Yes	Yes	Yes	No	Yes	No	Yes	No	No	6
Totals	8	8	8	8	3+3 (Note: Affiliate members Air Force, Mercer, and Utah)	8+1 (Note: Affiliate member Central Arkansas)	2+4 (Note: Affiliate members Delaware, Florida Atlantic, Gardner–Webb, and Old Dominion)	7+5 (Note: Affiliate members Abilene Christian, Austin Peay, Eastern Kentucky, North Alabama, and UT Arlington)	4	5	61+13

Notes

Men's varsity sports not sponsored by the league which are played by ASUN schools:

School	Football	Rowing	Volleyball	Wrestling
Bellarmine	No (Note: While non-football by NCAA criteria, Bellarmine fields a varsity team in the weight-restricted and non-NCAA variant of sprint football.)	No	No	SoCon
Jacksonville	No	Metro	No	No
Queens	No	No	MIVA	No
Stetson	Pioneer	Metro	No	No
West Florida	UAC	No	No	No

Notes

In addition to the aforementioned sports:

- Queens sponsors men's rugby and triathlon, neither of which has NCAA recognition of any type. It also considers its male cheerleaders to be varsity athletes.

=== Women's sports ===
Women's sponsored sports by school
School	Basketball	Beach volleyball	Cross country	Golf	Lacrosse	Soccer	Softball	Swimming & diving	Tennis	Track & field (indoor)	Track & field (outdoor)	Volleyball	Total Sports
Bellarmine	Yes	No	Yes	Yes	No	Yes	Yes	Yes	Yes	Yes	Yes	Yes	10
Florida Gulf Coast	Yes	Yes	Yes	Yes	No	Yes	Yes	Yes	Yes	No	No	Yes	9
Jacksonville	Yes	Yes	Yes	Yes	Yes	Yes	Yes	No	No	Yes	Yes	Yes	10
Lipscomb	Yes	No	Yes	Yes	No	Yes	Yes	No	Yes	Yes	Yes	Yes	9
North Florida	Yes	Yes	Yes	Yes	No	Yes	Yes	Yes	Yes	Yes	Yes	Yes	11
Queens	Yes	No	Yes	Yes	Yes	Yes	Yes	Yes	Yes	Yes	Yes	Yes	11
Stetson	Yes	Yes	Yes	Yes	Yes	Yes	Yes	No	Yes	No	Yes (Note: Stetson added women's outdoor track & field in 2026–27, but will initially compete only in distance events.)	Yes	10
West Florida	Yes	No	Yes	Yes	No	Yes	Yes	Yes	Yes	No	No	Yes	8
Totals	8	4+5 (Note: Affiliate members Austin Peay, Central Arkansas, Eastern Kentucky, North Alabama, and Tarleton)	8	8	3+6 (Note: Affiliate members Austin Peay, Coastal Carolina, Delaware, Kennesaw State, Liberty, and Lindenwood)	8	8	5+6 (Note: Affiliate members Delaware, Gardner–Webb, Georgia Southern, Little Rock, Old Dominion, and UNC Asheville)	7	5	6	8	78+17

Notes

Women's varsity sports not sponsored by the league which are played by ASUN schools:

School	Field hockey	Rowing	Rugby (Note: Part of the NCAA Emerging Sports for Women program.)	Triathlon
Bellarmine	MAC	No	No	No
Jacksonville	No	Metro	No	No
Queens	MPSF	No	IND	IND
Stetson	No	Metro	No	No

Notes

In addition to the aforementioned sports:

- Bellarmine considers the members of its all-female dance team to be varsity athletes.
- Queens considers its cheerleaders and dance team (the latter all-female, though listed on its athletic website as coeducational) to be varsity athletes.

== Facilities ==
School	Basketball arena	Capacity	Baseball stadium	Capacity	Soccer stadium	Capacity
Bellarmine	Knights Hall	2,196	Knights Field	—N/a	Owsley B. Frazier Stadium	2,000
Florida Gulf Coast	Alico Arena	4,633	Swanson Stadium	1,500	FGCU Soccer Complex	1,500
Jacksonville	Swisher Gymnasium	1,500	John Sessions Stadium	1,500	Southern Oak Stadium	500
Lipscomb	Allen Arena	5,028	Ken Dugan Field	1,500	Lipscomb Soccer Complex	600
North Florida	UNF Arena	5,800	Harmon Stadium	1,000	Hodges Stadium	9,300
Queens	Curry Arena	2,500	Tuckaseegee Dream Fields	—N/a	Dickson Field	—N/a
Stetson	Edmunds Center	5,000	Melching Field at Conrad Park	2,500	Stetson Soccer Complex	500
West Florida	UWF Field House	1,750	Jim Spooner Field	2,500	UWF Soccer Complex	1,000

== All Sports Championships ==
The Jesse C. Fletcher and Sherman Day Trophies are awarded each year to the top men's and women's program in the conference. The Bill Bibb Trophy, combining the men's and women's results for the best overall program, was first awarded in 2006–07. East Tennessee State won this overall trophy seven of the nine years it has been awarded; Florida Gulf Coast won in 2012–13, 2014–15 and 2015–16.

=== Men's All Sports: Jesse C. Fletcher Trophy ===
Year	Champion
1978–79	Oklahoma City
1979–80	Northeast Louisiana
1980–81	Northeast Louisiana
1981–82	Northeast Louisiana
1982–83	Georgia Southern
1983–84	Centenary
1984–85	Georgia Southern
1985–86	Houston Baptist
1986–87	Georgia Southern
1987–88	Georgia Southern
1988–89	Georgia Southern
1989–90	Georgia Southern
1990–91	Georgia Southern
1991–92	Florida International
1992–93	Florida International
1993–94	Florida International
1994–95	Central Florida
1995–96	Central Florida
1996–97	Florida International
1997–98	Georgia State
1998–99	Central Florida
1999–00	Georgia State
2000–01	Georgia State
2001–02	Georgia State
2002–03	Central Florida
2003–04	Central Florida
2004–05	Central Florida
2005–06	East Tennessee State
2006–07	East Tennessee State
2007–08	East Tennessee State
2008–09	East Tennessee State
2009–10	East Tennessee State
2010–11	East Tennessee State
2011–12	East Tennessee State
2012–13	Florida Gulf Coast
2013–14	East Tennessee State
2014–15	North Florida
2015–16	North Florida
2017–18	North Florida
2018–19	Liberty
2021–22	Liberty
2022–23	Liberty
2023–24	Lipscomb
2024–25	North Alabama
2025–26	Central Arkansas

=== Women's All Sports: Sherman Day Trophy ===
Year	Champion
1978–79	None
1979–80	None
1980–81	None
1981–82	None
1982–83	None
1983–84	None
1984–85	None
1985–86	Stetson, Georgia State
1986–87	Stetson
1987–88	Georgia State
1988–89	Georgia State
1989–90	Georgia State
1990–91	Florida International
1991–92	Florida International
1992–93	Georgia State
1993–94	Florida International
1994–95	Campbell
1995–96	Central Florida
1996–97	Central Florida
1997–98	Georgia State
1998–99	Central Florida
1999–00	Georgia State
2000–01	Georgia State
2001–02	Central Florida
2002–03	Central Florida
2003–04	Central Florida
2004–05	Central Florida
2005–06	Florida Atlantic
2006–07	East Tennessee State
2007–08	Jacksonville
2008–09	Jacksonville
2009–10	Kennesaw State
2010–11	Jacksonville
2011–12	Kennesaw State
2012–13	Florida Gulf Coast
2013–14	Jacksonville
2014–15	Florida Gulf Coast
2015–16	Florida Gulf Coast
2016–17	Florida Gulf Coast
2017–18	Florida Gulf Coast
2018–19	Liberty
2021–22	Liberty
2022–23	Liberty
2023–24	Lipscomb
2024–25	Florida Gulf Coast
2025–26	Florida Gulf Coast

=== Combined All Sports: Bill Bibb Trophy ===
Year	Champion
2006–07	ETSU
2007–08	ETSU
2008–09	ETSU
2009–10	ETSU
2010–11	ETSU
2011–12	ETSU
2012–13	FGCU
2013–14	ETSU
2014–15	FGCU
2015–16	FGCU
2016–17	FGCU
2017–18	Kennesaw State
2018–19	Liberty
2021–22	Liberty
2022–23	Liberty
2023–24	Lipscomb
2024–25	FGCU
2025–26	Central Arkansas

== Championships ==
=== Men's basketball ===
This is a partial list of the last 10 champions. For the full history, see ASUN men's basketball tournament.

Season	Reg. season champions(s)	Tournament champion
2015–16	North Florida	Florida Gulf Coast
2016–17	Florida Gulf Coast	Florida Gulf Coast
2018–19	Lipscomb; Liberty	Liberty
2019–20	Liberty; North Florida	Liberty
2020–21	Liberty	Liberty
2021–22	Liberty (East); Jacksonville State (West)	Bellarmine (Note: Because Bellarmine was in the second season of its four-year transition from Division II, it was ineligible for the NCAA tournament. Under ASUN rules, Jacksonville State received the ASUN's automatic bid by virtue of the best regular-season conference record.)
2022–23	Kennesaw State; Liberty	Kennesaw State
2023–24	Eastern Kentucky	Stetson
2024–25	Lipscomb; North Alabama	Lipscomb
2025–26	Central Arkansas; Austin Peay	Queens

=== Women's basketball ===
This is a partial list of the last 10 champions. For the full history, see ASUN women's basketball tournament.

Season	Reg. season champions(s)	Tournament champion
2016–17	Stetson	Florida Gulf Coast
2017–18	Florida Gulf Coast	Florida Gulf Coast
2018–19	Florida Gulf Coast	Florida Gulf Coast
2019–20	Florida Gulf Coast	None (COVID-19)
2020–21	Florida Gulf Coast	Florida Gulf Coast
2021–22	Florida Gulf Coast (East, and overall); Jacksonville State (West)	Florida Gulf Coast
2022–23	Florida Gulf Coast	Florida Gulf Coast
2023–24	Florida Gulf Coast	Florida Gulf Coast
2024–25	Florida Gulf Coast	Florida Gulf Coast
2025–26	Eastern Kentucky	Jacksonville

=== Baseball ===
- ASUN Conference baseball tournament
